= Lists of Armenians =

This is a list of notable Armenians.

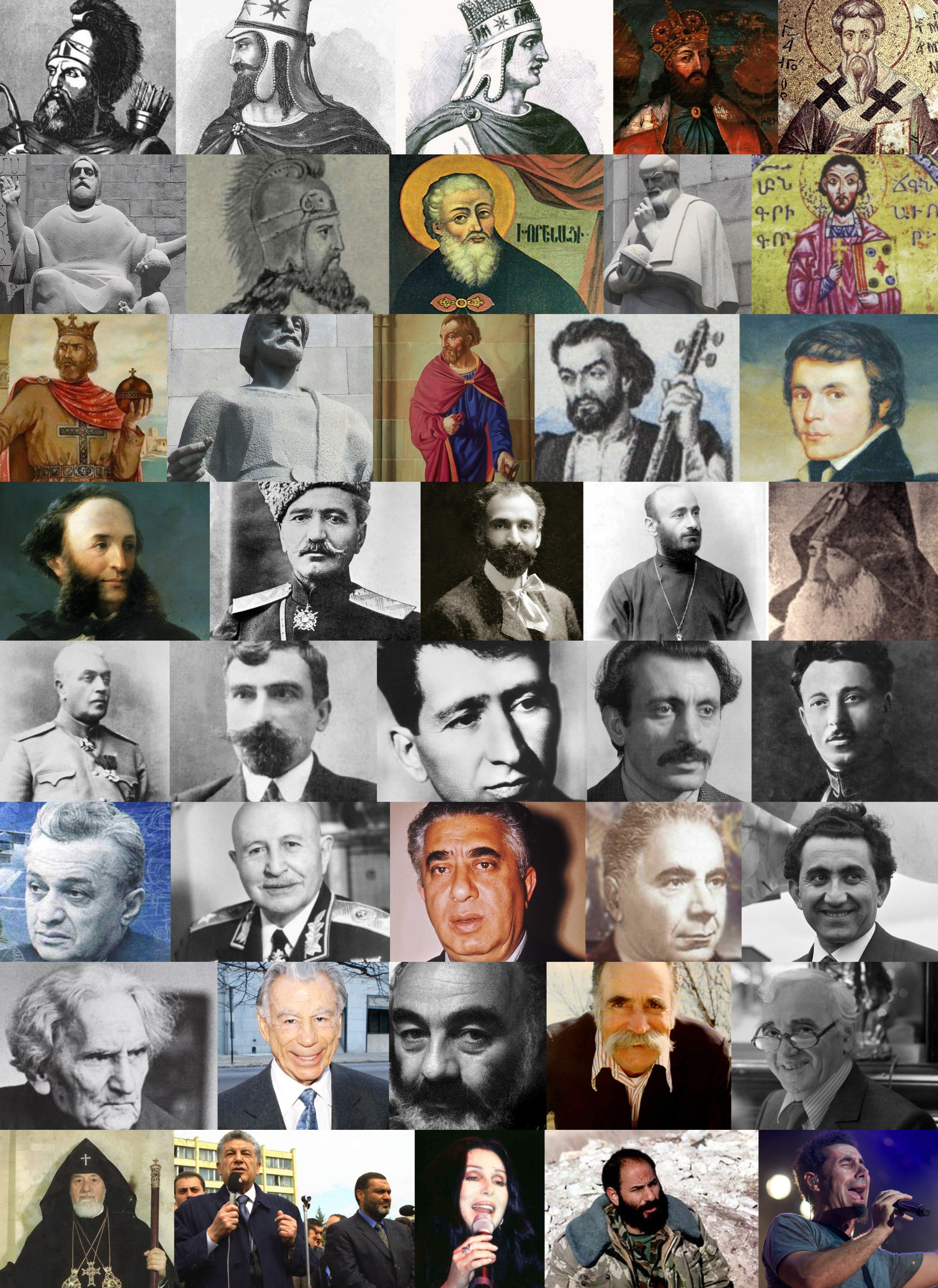
1st row: Hayk • Artaxias I • Tigranes the Great • Trdat III • Gregory the Illuminator 2nd row: Mesrop Mashtots • Vardan Mamikonian • Movses Khorenatsi • Anania Shirakatsi • Grigor Narekatsi 3rd row: Levon II • Toros Roslin • Momik • Sayat Nova • Khachatur Abovyan 4th row: Ivan Aivazovsky • Andranik Ozanyan • Hovhannes Tumanyan • Komitas • Mkrtich Khrimian 5th row: Tovmas Nazarbekian • Aram Manukian • Yeghishe Charents • Arshile Gorky • Gaia Gai 6th row: Artem Mikoyan • Ivan Bagramyan • Aram Khachaturian • Viktor Ambartsumyan • Tigran Petrosian 7th row: Martiros Saryan • Kirk Kerkorian • Sergei Parajanov • William Saroyan • Charles Aznavour 8th row: Vazgen I • Karen Demirchyan and Vazgen Sargsyan • Cher • Monte Melkonyan • Serj Tankian

== By country ==
Americas

- List of Armenian Americans
- List of Armenian Canadians

Caucasus

- List of Azerbaijani Armenians
- List of Georgian Armenians
- List of Armenians from Nagorno-Karabakh

Europe

- List of French Armenians
- List of Greek Armenians
- List of Armenians in the United Kingdom
- List of Romanians of Armenian descent
- List of Russian Armenians

Middle East

- List of Egyptian Armenians
- List of Iranian Armenians
- List of Iraqi Armenians
- List of Lebanese Armenians
- List of Ottoman Armenians
- List of Syrian Armenians
- List of Turkish Armenians

Word

- List of ambassadors of Armenia

== Leaders and politicians ==
=== Armenia ===
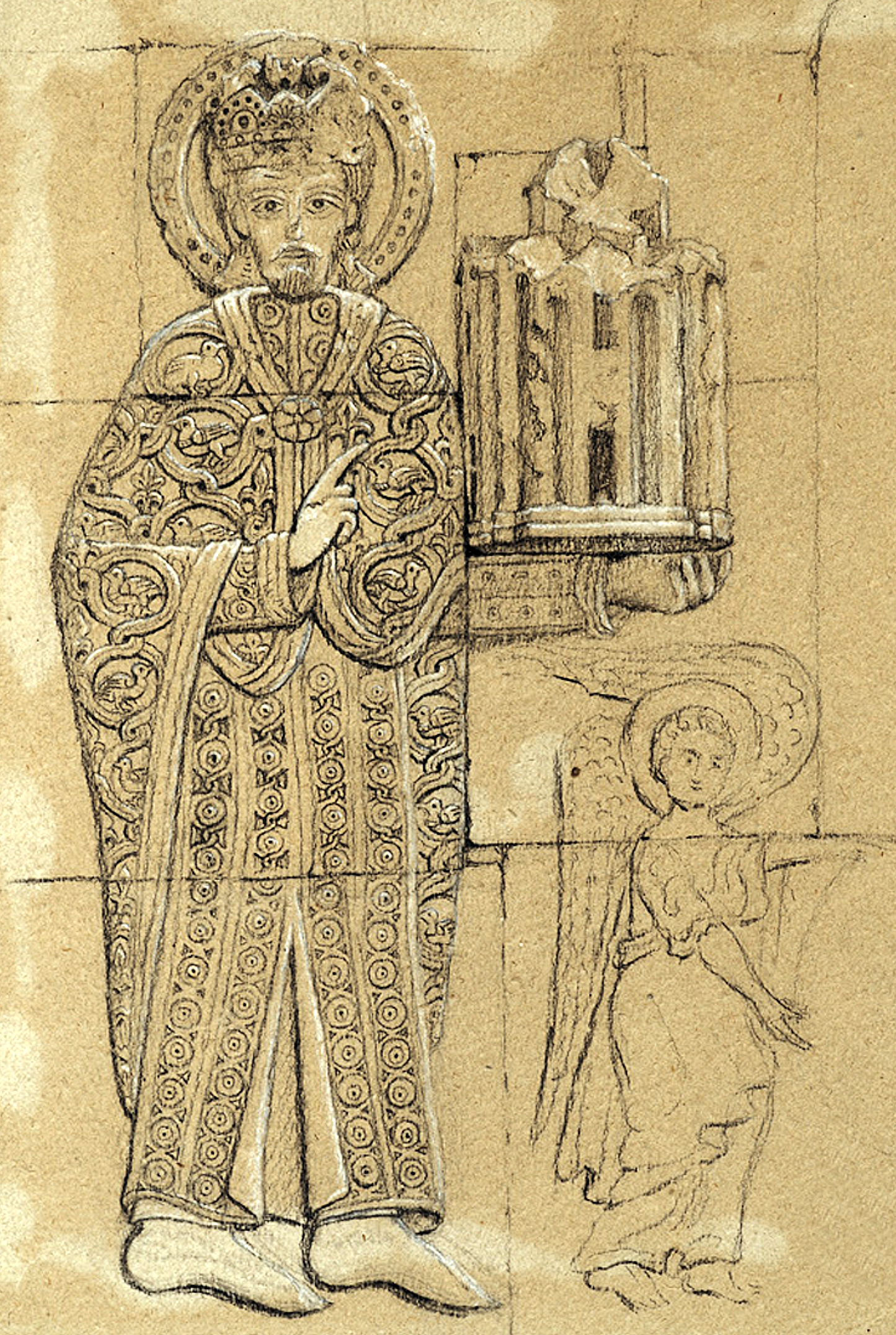
Gagik I Artsruni, King of Vaspurakan

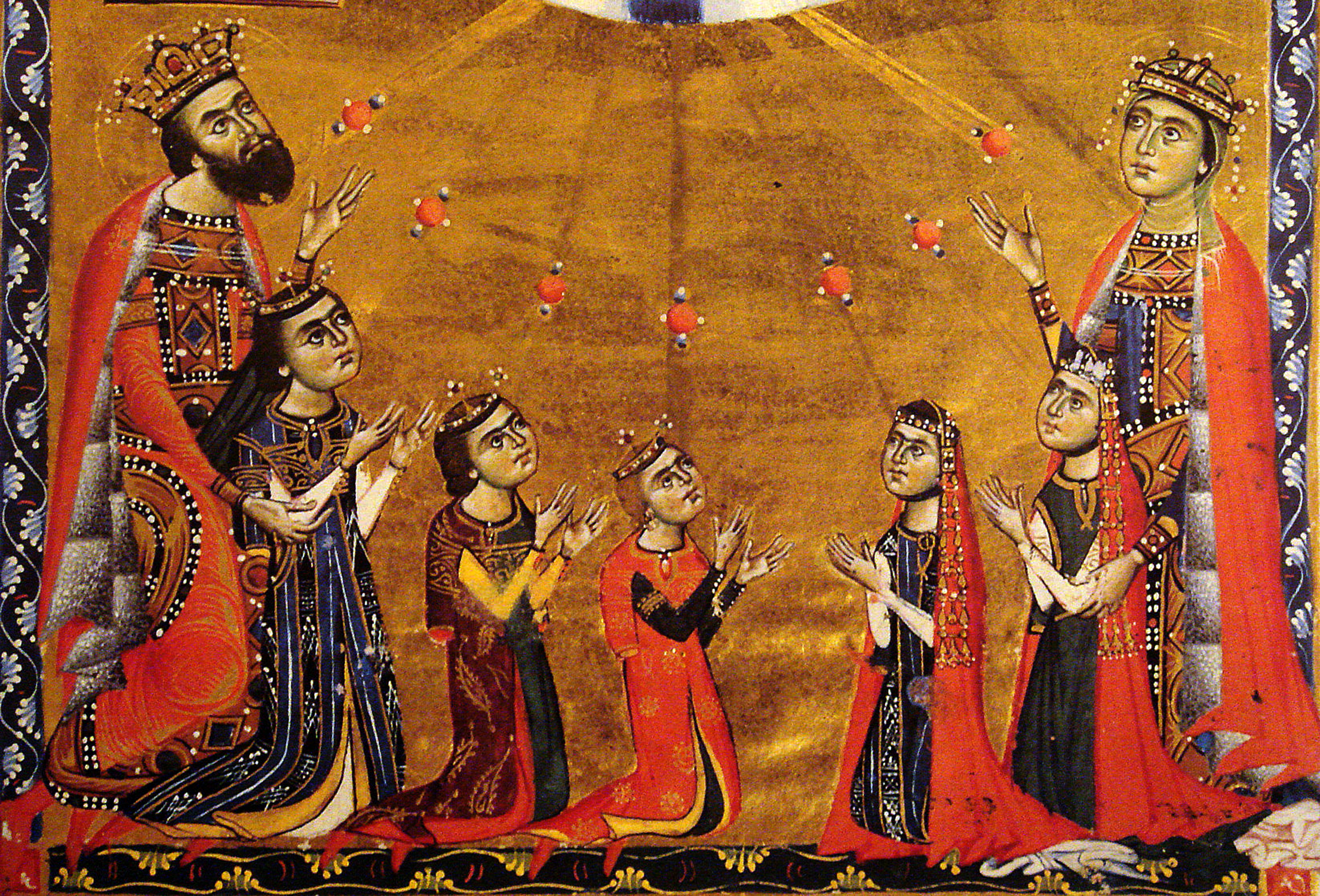
Leo II, queen Guerane, and their five children

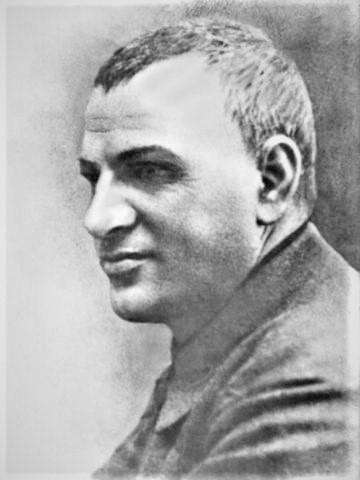
Alexander Miasnikian, Chairman of the Council of People's Commissars of Soviet Armenia

- Zarmayr Haykazuni, legendary King of Armenia from 1192 BC to 1180 BC
- Orontes I Sakavakyats, legendary King of Armenia from 570 to 560 BC
- Tigranes Orontid, legendary King of Armenia from 560 to 535 BC
- Orontes III, King of Armenia from 321 to 260 BC
- Artaxias I, King of Armenia from 190 to 159 BC, founder of Artaxiad dynasty
- Tigranes the Great, King of Armenia from 95 to 55 BC
- Artavasdes II, King of Armenia from 55 to 34 BC
- Erato, Queen of Armenia from 10 to 2 BC, last queen of Artaxiad dynasty
- Tiridates I, King of Armenia from 52 to 58, from 62 to 66, officially from 66 to 88, founder of Arsacid dynasty in Armenia
- Tiridates III, King of Armenia from 287 to 330, Under his rule Armenia became the first state to officially embrace Christianity
- Pap of Armenia, King of Armenia from 370 to 374
- Artaxias IV, King of Armenia from 422 to 428, last king of Arsacid dynasty
- Ashot I, King of Bagratid Armenia from 885 to 890
- Smbat I, King of Bagratid Armenia from 890 to 914
- Gagik I Artsruni, King of Vaspurakan from 904–937/943
- Ashot III, King of Bagratid Armenia from 953 to 977
- Gagik I of Armenia, King of Armenia from 989 to 1020
- Gagik II of Armenia, King of Armenia from 1042 to 1045, last king of Bagratid Armenia
- Roupen I, Lord of Armenian Kingdom of Cilicia from 1080 or 1081 or 1082 to 1095, founder of Rubenids
- Leo II, King of Armenian Kingdom of Cilicia from 1198 or 1199 to 1219
- Isabella, Queen of Armenian Kingdom of Cilicia from 1219 to 1252
- Leo II, King of Armenia, King of the Armenian Kingdom of Cilicia from 1269 or 1270 to 1289
- Hethum II, King of Cilician Armenia from 1289 to 1293
- Hovhannes Kajaznuni (1868–1938), 1st Prime Minister of First Republic of Armenia
- Alexander Khatisian (1874–1945), 2nd Prime Minister of Armenia
- Hamo Ohanjanyan (1873–1947), 3rd Prime Minister of Armenia
- Simon Vratsian (1882–1969), 4th Prime Minister of First Republic of Armenia
- Gevorg Alikhanyan (1897–1938), First Secretary of the Communist Party of Armenia from 1920 to 1921
- Alexander Miasnikian (1886–1925), Chairman of the Council of People's Commissars of Soviet Armenia from 1921 to 1922
- Askanaz Mravyan (1885–1929), First Secretary of the Communist Party of Armenia from 1921 to 1922
- Sargis Lukashin (1883–1937), Chairman of the Council of People's Commissars of Soviet Armenia from 1922 to 1925
- Sahak Ter-Gabrielyan (1886–1937), Chairman of the Council of People's Commissars of Soviet Armenia from 1928 to 1935
- Aghasi Khanjian (1901–1936), First Secretary of the Communist Party of Armenia from 1930 to 1936
- Grigory Arutinov (1900–1957), First Secretary of the Communist Party of Armenia from 1937 to 1953
- Suren Tovmasyan (1910–1980), First Secretary of the Communist Party of Armenia from 1953 to 1960
- Yakov Zarobyan (1908–1980), First Secretary of the Communist Party of Armenia from 1960 to 1966
- Anton Kochinyan (1913–1990), First Secretary of the Communist Party of Armenia from 1966 to 1974
- Jemma Ananyan (1931–2018) politician of the Communist Party of Armenia
- Karen Demirchyan (1932–1999), the First Secretary of the Communist Party of Armenia from 1974 to 1988
- Levon Ter-Petrosyan (b. 1945), First president of Armenia
- Robert Kocharyan (b. 1954), 2nd President of Armenia
- Serzh Sargsyan (b. 1954), 3rd President of Armenia
- Nikol Pashinyan (b. 1975), 16th Prime Minister of Armenia

=== Royalty ===
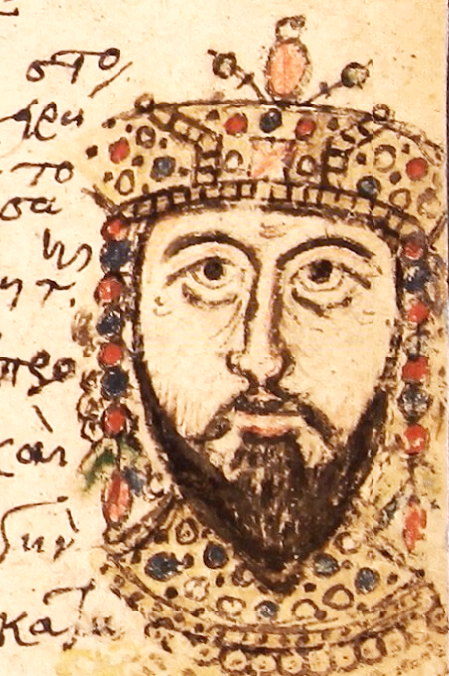
Leo V the Armenian, Byzantine emperor

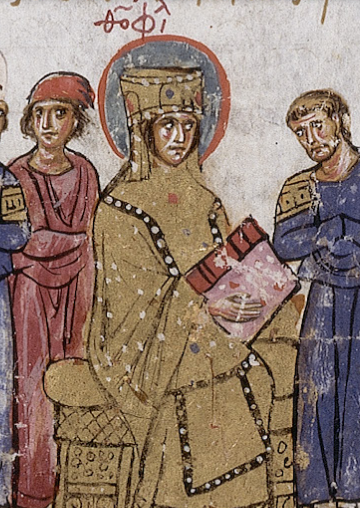
Teodora wife of Theophilos, Byzantine empress regnant and Byzantine empress consort

- Zariadres, King of Sophene
- Mithrobouzanes of Sophene, King of Sophene
- Arkathias, King of Sophene
- Ptolemaeus of Commagene, King of Commagene (163 BC–130 BC)
- Sames II Theosebes Dikaios, King of Commagene (130 BC–109 BC)
- Mithridates I Callinicus, King of Commagene (109 BC–70 BC)
- Antiochus I of Commagene, King of Commagene (70 BC–31 BC)
- Antiochus II of Commagene, Prince of Commagene
- Mithridates II of Commagene, King of Commagene (31 BC–20 BC)
- Mithridates III of Commagene, King of Commagene (20 BC–12 BC)
- Antiochus III of Commagene, King of Commagene (12 BC–17 AD)
- Abgar V, first Christian King (according to Khorenatsi)
- Antiochus IV of Commagene, King of Commagene (38 AD–72 AD)
- Princess Sandukht, regretted first Christian Armenian woman
- Salome of Ujarma (297–361), princess who married into the Chosroid Dynasty of Iberia
- Parandzem, was the consort of King Arshak II of Armenia
- Heraclius (575–641), emperor of Byzantine, led a revolt against the unpopular emperor Phocas
- Varaz Grigor (585–654), King of Caucasian Albania
- Mizizios (622–669), usurper of the Byzantine throne in Sicily
- Isaac the Armenian (625–644), an exarch of Ravenna
- Constantine IV (by mother) (650–665), Byzantine emperor
- Philippicus (711–713), Byzantine emperor
- Artabasdos (741–743), Byzantine general and Byzantine emperor
- Basil I the Macedonian (Βασίλειος Α') (811–886), (ruled 867–886), married the Varangian Eudokia Ingerina
- Leo V the Armenian (775–820, ruled 813–820), married to Theodosia
- Adarnase I of Tao-Klarjeti, nobleman of Iberia and founder of the Bagrationi dynasty.
- Constantine, Byzantine co-emperor (813–820)
- Theodosia (Θεοδοσία) (775–826), empress consort of Leo V the Armenian
- Sahl Smbatean (d. 855), prince of Arran and Shaki
- Theodora (Θεοδώρα) (ruled 842–856), wife of Theophilos
- Grigor Hamam (d. 897), King of Hereti from 893 to 897
- Zoe Zaoutzaina (d. 899), Byzantine empress consort
- Sahak Sevada (d. 940), Prince of Gardman
- Adarnase of Hereti (d. 943), King of Hereti (897–943)
- Romanos I Lekapenos (Ρωμανός Β') (870–948, ruled 919–944), co-emperor, attempted to found his own dynasty; deposed by his sons and entered monastery
- John I Tzimiskes (Ιωάννης Α') (925–976, ruled 969–976), general, brother-in-law of Romanos II, regent for Basil II and Constantine VIII
- Moses of Bulgaria, Bulgarian noble, brother of Emperor Samuel of Bulgaria
- Samuel of Bulgaria (d. 1014), Tsar of Bulgaria from 997 to 1014
- Gagik of Kakheti (d. 1058), King of Kakheti and Hereti
- Thoros of Edessa (d. 1098), ruler of Edessa at the time of the First Crusade
- Mariam of Vaspurakan, first consort of the king George I of Georgia
- Arda of Armenia, Queen of Jerusalem
- Morphia of Melitene, Queen consort of Jerusalem
- Melisende, Queen of Jerusalem (1131–1153)
- Badr al-Din Lu'lu', Emir of Mosul (1234–1259)
- Shajar al-Durr (1250) (Mamluk Sultan)
- Rita of Armenia (1278–1333), Princess, was a Byzantine Empress consort by marriage to Michael IX Palaiologos
- John III the Terrible (1572–1574), Voivode of Moldavia
- Şivekar Sultan, Haseki Sultan of the Ottoman Empire (1646–1648)
- Melik Shahnazar II (d. 1792), melik of Varanda, one of the five Melikdoms of Karabakh
- Princess Rym Ali, wife of Prince Ali bin Hussein of Jordan

=== Politicians ===
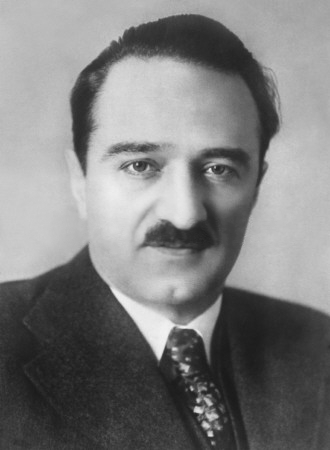
Soviet statesman Anastas Mikoyan managed to remain at the highest levels of power from the days of Lenin to his retirement under Brezhnev.

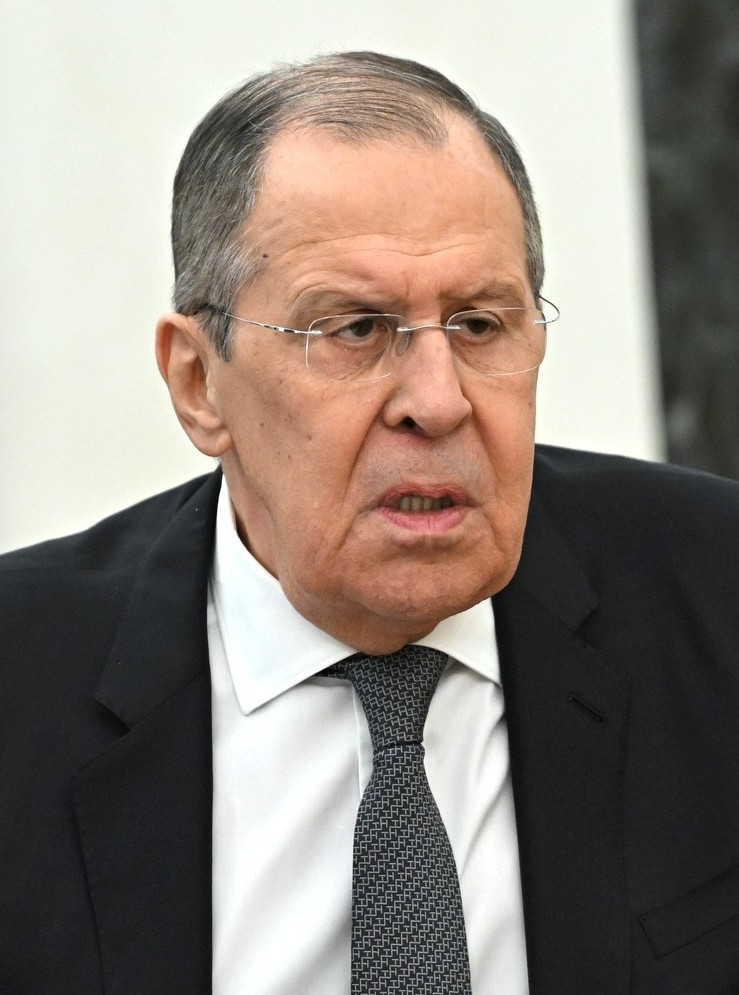
Sergey Lavrov – Minister of Foreign Affairs of Russia (2004–)

- Aziz al-Dawla (d. 1022), Fatimid Governor of Aleppo
- Marcara Avanchintz, trader from Isfahan, who went into the service of Louis XIV
- Damat Halil Pasha, Grand Vizier of the Ottoman Empire (1626–1628)
- Mirza Zulqarnain, diwan and faujdar of the Mughal Empire
- Ignatius Mouradgea d'Ohsson, orientalist, historian and diplomat in Swedish service
- Israel Ori, diplomat that sought the liberation of Armenia from Persia and the Ottoman Empire
- István Gorove, Minister of Agriculture, Industry and Trade of Hungary (1867–1870)
- Daniel-Bek of Sassun, bek in Sassun
- Manuc Bei, a boyar, merchant, diplomat, and inn-keeper
- Mohammad Beg, Grand Vizier of the Safavid Empire (1654—1661)
- Solayman Khan Saham al-Dowleh (d. 1853), nobleman from the Enikolopian family, who served as a government official in Qajar Iran
- Nubar Pasha, Prime Minister of Egypt (1878–1879, 1884–1888, 1894–1895)
- Boghos Nubar, founder of the Armenian General Benevolent Union
- Mikhail Loris-Melikov, Minister of Interior of the Russian Empire (1880–1881)
- Hagop Kazazian Pasha, high-ranking Ottoman official, Minister of Finance (1887–1891)
- Dawid Abrahamowicz, Member of the Imperial Council of Austria (1875–1918)
- Lev Karakhan, Russian revolutionary and a Soviet diplomat. A member of the RSDLP (1904)
- György Lukács, Minister of Religion and Education of Hungary (1905–1906)
- Alexander Bekzadyan, Bolshevik revolutionary and Soviet statesman
- László Lukács, Prime Minister of the Kingdom of Hungary (1912–1913)
- Ohannes Kouyoumdjian, Mount Lebanon Mutasarrifate (1912–1915)
- Basile M. Missir, President of the Senate of Romania (1914–1916)
- Vasile Morțun, President of the Senate of Romania (1916–1918)
- Stepan Shahumyan, Head of the Baku Commune (1918)
- Hovhannes Hakhverdyan, first Defence Minister of Armenia (1918–1919)
- Aram Manukian, Minister of Internal Affairs of Armenia (1918–1919)
- Armen Garo, Ambassador of Armenia to the United States (1918–1920)
- Avetis Aharonian, politician, writer, public figure and revolutionary, also part of the Armenian national movement, Chairman of the Parliament of Armenia (1919–1920)
- Diana Abgar, one of the first women to have ever been appointed in any diplomatic post in the twentieth century. Council of Armenia in Japan (1920)
- Yakov Davydov, Soviet diplomat first head of the Cheka's Foreign Department (1921–1922)
- Kamo, Old Bolshevik revolutionary and an early companion to Soviet leader Joseph Stalin
- Levon Mirzoyan, first Secretary of the Communist Party of Azerbaijan (1926–1929)
- Virgil Madgearu, Minister of Finance of Romania (1929–1930)
- Hovhannes Masehyan, Persian Ambassador to the Great Britain (1927–1929), and first Ambassador of Persia to Japan (1930–1931)
- Varlam Avanesov, Bolshevik revolutionary and Soviet communist politician
- Suren Shadunts, First Secretary of the Communist Party of Tajikistan (1934–1937)
- Ivan Tevosian, Soviet politician of Armenian descent. Hero of Socialist Labor (1943)
- Ioan Missir, Mayor of Botoșani (1931–1932), (1941–1944)
- Ferenc Szálasi, fascist Leader of the Nation of Hungary (1944–1945)
- Stepan Akopov, member of the Communist Party of the Soviet Union, Minister of Mechanical Engineering of the USSR (1953–1954)
- Anastas Mikoyan, first Deputy Chairman of the Council of Ministers of the Soviet Union (1955–1964)
- Bob Avakian, Chairman of the Revolutionary Communist Party, USA (1975)
- Ken Khachigian, White House Chief Speechwriter (1981)
- George Deukmejian, Governor of California (1983–1991)
- Edward Djerejian, United States Ambassador to Israel (1993–1994)
- Édouard Balladur, Prime Minister of France (1993–1995)
- Anna Eshoo, Member of the U.S. House of Representatives from California (1993–2025)
- Shahen Nikolay Petrosyan, Chairman of the Supreme Court of Armenia
- Boris Şyhmyradow, Minister of Foreign Affairs of Turkmenistan (1995–2000)
- Émile Lahoud, President of Lebanon (1998–2007)
- Karim Pakradouni, Minister of State for Administrative Development of Lebanon (2004–2005)
- Zurab Zhvania, Prime Minister of Georgia (2004–2005)
- Abel Aganbegyan, Soviet and Russian economist, a full member of the Russian Academy of Sciences
- Sergey Lavrov, Minister of Foreign Affairs of Russia (2004–)
- Varujan Vosganian, Minister of Economy and Finance of Romania (2007–2008, 2012–2013)
- Patrick Devedjian, French Minister for the Implementation of the Recovery Plan (2008–2010)
- Liliam Kechichián, Uruguay Minister of Tourism (2012–2020)
- Joe Hockey, Treasurer of Australia (2013–2015)
- Arsen Avakov, Minister of Internal Affairs of Ukraine (2014–2021)
- Jackie Speier, Member of the U.S. House of Representatives from California (2008–2023)
- Gladys Berejiklian, 45th Premier of New South Wales, Australia (2017–2021)

== Military figures ==
=== Antiquity ===
- Nebuchadnezzar IV, becoming the Babylon king and leading a revolt against the Achaemenid Empire
- Dadarsi, Persian general and Satrap of Bactria
- Mithraustes, one of the commanders at Battle of Gaugamela and identified with Vahe
- Nemanes the Armenian, one of the commanders at the Battle of Protopachium
- Archelaus of Cilicia (d. 38), Cappadocian prince and a Roman client king

=== Middle Ages ===
There have been a lot of Armenian commanders throughout history, there were many Armenian commanders among the troops of Byzantine Empire, Sasanian Iran, the Georgian Kingdom and other states.

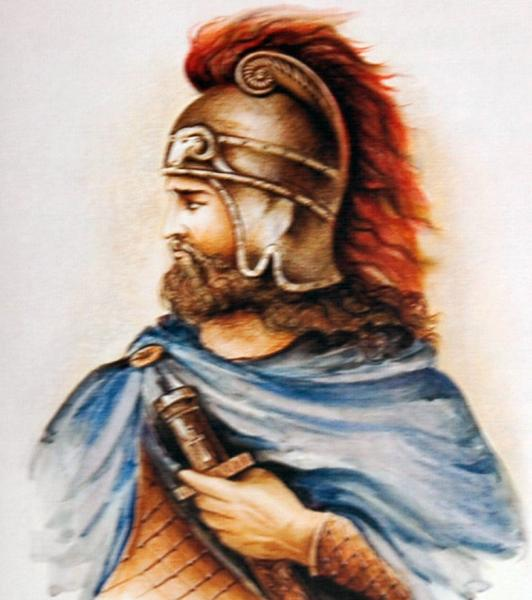
Vardan Mamikonian died in 451 while leading the Armenians at the Battle of Avarayr, which ultimately secured their right to practice Christianity

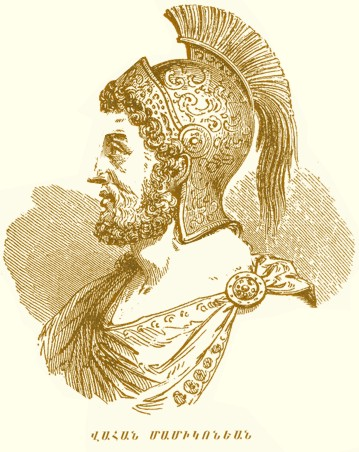
Vahan Mamikonian, was a marzban (governor) of Persian Armenia

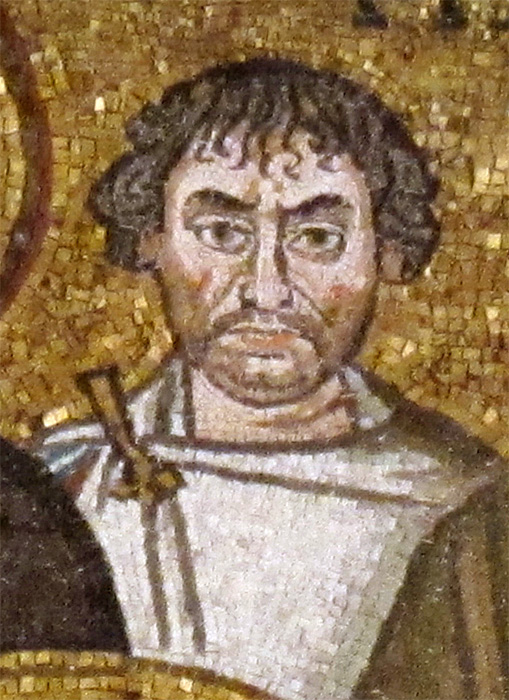
Narses, one of the great generals in the service of the Byzantine Emperor Justinian I during the Gothic War

- Cylaces, hayr-mardpet
- Artavasdes I Mamikonian, Sparapet, oldest ancestor of the Mamikonian family
- Vache I Mamikonian (d. 335 or 338), Sparapet
- Mushegh I Mamikonian (d. 377 or 378), Sparapet
- Vassak Mamikonian (d. 368), Sparapet
- Vardan Mamikonian (d. 451), Sparapet
- Vasak Siwni (d. 452), Lord of Syunik and Marzban of Persian Armenia
- Arshavir II Kamsarakan (d. 460), prince from the Kamsarakan family
- Vahan I Mamikonian (d. 510), Marzban of Persian Armenia
- Adolius (d. 543), Byzantine silentiarius and military officer
- John the Armenian (d. 533), Byzantine official and military leader
- Narses (478–573), one of Byzantine Emperor Justinian I's generals in the Roman reconquest
- Smbat IV Bagratuni, Marzban of Hyrcania and Persian Armenia
- Vahan (d. 636), Byzantine military leader
- Saborios, Byzantine general who rose in revolt against Emperor Constans II
- Rhahzadh (d. 627), Sasanian general under Shah Khosrow II
- Mushegh III Mamikonian (d. 636), Sparapet that fought against the Arabs during the Muslim conquest of Persia
- Theodore Rshtuni (d. 655/656), was an Armenian nakharar (magnate), famous for resisting the first Arab invasions of Armenia
- Jalinus, dynast, one of the leading figures in Sasanian Iran
- Mjej II Gnuni, Sparapet of Armenia and Syria
- Ashot Msaker (d. 775), prince from the Bagratid family
- Tatzates (d. 785), prominent Byzantine general, governor of Arminiya
- Manuel the Armenian (d. 838/860), prominent Byzantine general, reached the highest military ranks
- Ali ibn Yahya al-Armani (d. 863), famed Muslim military commander
- Bardas (d. 866), Byzantine noble and high-ranking minister
- Stylianos Zaoutzes (d. 899), high Byzantine official
- Melias (d. 934), prince who entered Byzantine service and became a distinguished general
- John Kourkouas (d. 946), one of the most important generals of the Byzantine Empire
- Manuel Kourtikes, Byzantine official and military commander
- Theophilos Kourkouas (d. 960s), was a distinguished Byzantine general
- John Kourkouas (d. 971), was a senior Byzantine military commander
- Bardas Skleros (d. 979), Byzantine general who led a wide-scale Asian rebellion against Emperor Basil II
- Gregory Taronites (d. 991/995), prince of Taron, who went over to Byzantine service
- Ashot Taronites (d. 995 or 997), Byzantine nobleman, captured by the Bulgarians
- John Kourkouas (d. 1010), the Byzantine catepan of Italy
- Vahram Pahlavouni (d. 1046), was a military commander and official in Bagratuni Armenia
- Gregory Pakourianos (d. 1086), Byzantine general
- Philaretos Brachamios (d. 1087), general, usurper of the Byzantine Empire
- Badr al-Jamali (d. 1094), Vizier and prominent statesman for the Fatimid Caliphate
- Kogh Vasil (d. 1112), ruler of Raban and Kaisun at the time of the First Crusade
- Tatoul of Marash (d. after 1104), lord of Marash
- Constantine of Gargar (d. 1117), chieftain who ruled the region around Gerger
- Michael Aspietes (d. 1176), Byzantine general serving under Emperor Manuel I Komnenos
- Zakare II Zakarian (d. 1212), prince and a Court official of the Kingdom of Georgia holding the office of amirspasalar
- Ivane I Zakarian (d. 1227), prince, and a Court official of the Kingdom of Georgia holding the offices of Msakhurtukhutsesi
- Sharaf al-Din Qaraqush (d. 1212), Circassian Mamluk in the service of the Ayyubid dynasty
- Grigor Khaghbakian (d. 1223), Prince of the Armenian Khaghbakian family in the province of Zakarid Armenia, Kingdom of Georgia
- Vache I Vachutian (d. 1230), prince, and a Court official of the Kingdom of Georgia
- Shahnshah Zakarian (d. 1261), prince Zakarid dynasty, and a Court official of the Kingdom of Georgia
- Zakare III Zakarian (d.1262), Court official of the Kingdom of Georgia
- Avag Zakarian (d. 1268), noble of the Zakarid line, and a Court official of the Kingdom of Georgia, as atabeg and amirspasalar
- Sempad the Constable (d. 1276), was a noble Cilician Armenia, and was an older brother of King Hetoum I
- Sadun Artsruni (d. 1282), Prince of Haghbat and Mankaberd, he was a court official and became Atabeg and Amirspasalar of the Kingdom of Eastern Georgia
- Prosh Khaghbakian (d. 1283), prince who was a vassal of the Zakarid princes of Armenia
- Ivane II Zakarian (d. 1288), member of the Armenian Zakarid dynasty, and a Court official of the Kingdom of Georgia
- Khutlubuga (d. 1293), prince of the House of the Artsrunids, and a court official of the Kingdom of Eastern Georgia
- Amir Hasan II (d. 1351), ruler of the Armenian Proshyan dynasty

=== Early modern period ===
There were many Armenian commanders among the states of the Ottoman Empire, Russian Empire and Safavid Iran

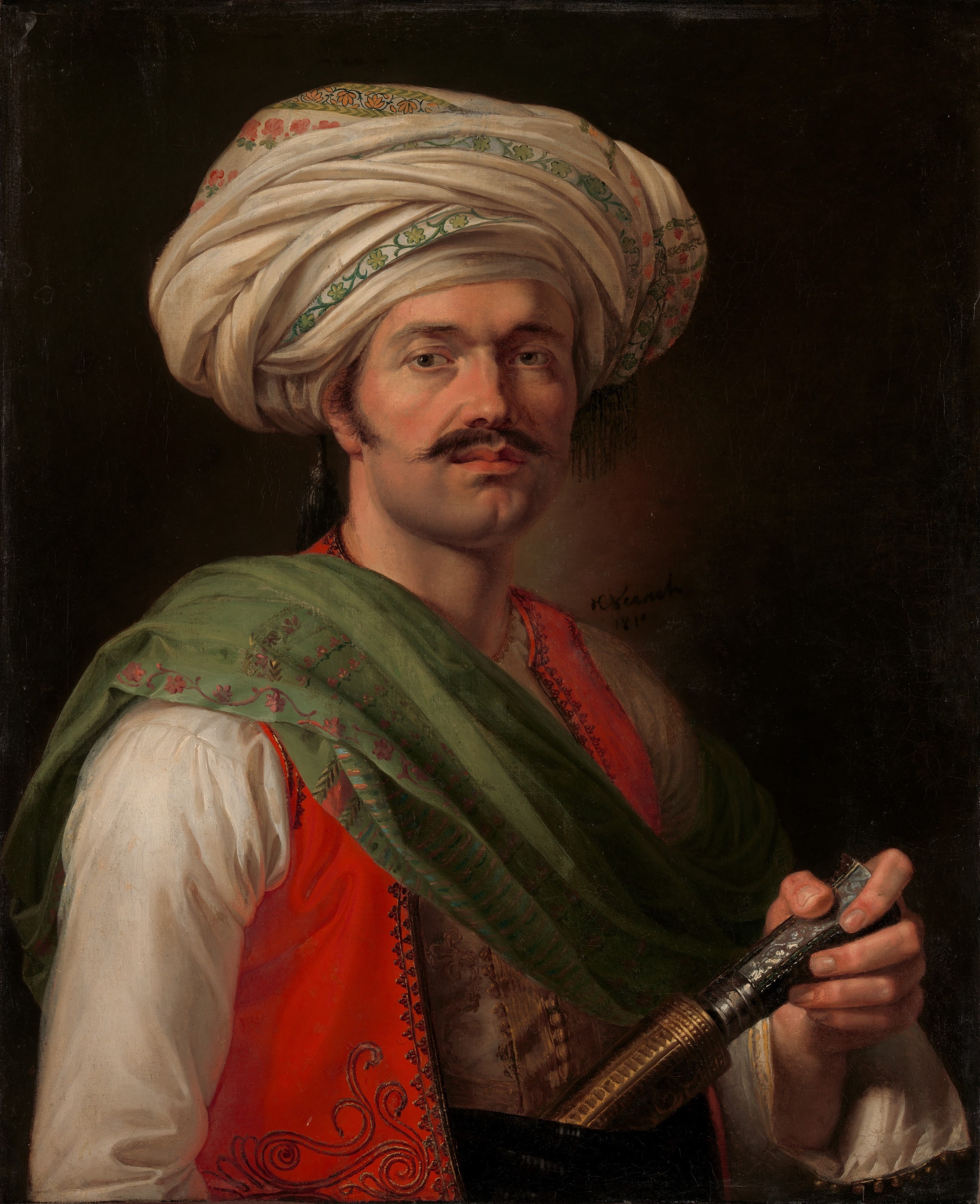
Roustam Raza, mamluk served Napoleon for fifteen years, travelling with the First Consul and subsequent Emperor on all of his campaigns

- Khosrow Soltan Armani (d. 1653), Safavid official, military commander, and gholam
- David Bek (d. 1728), military commander in Syunik
- Mkhitar Sparapet (d. 1730), military commander in Syunik
- Roustam Raza (1783–1843), Bodyguard and secondary valet of Napoleon
- Ernő Kiss (1799–1849), was a Hungarian Army lieutenant-general

=== Russian Empire ===
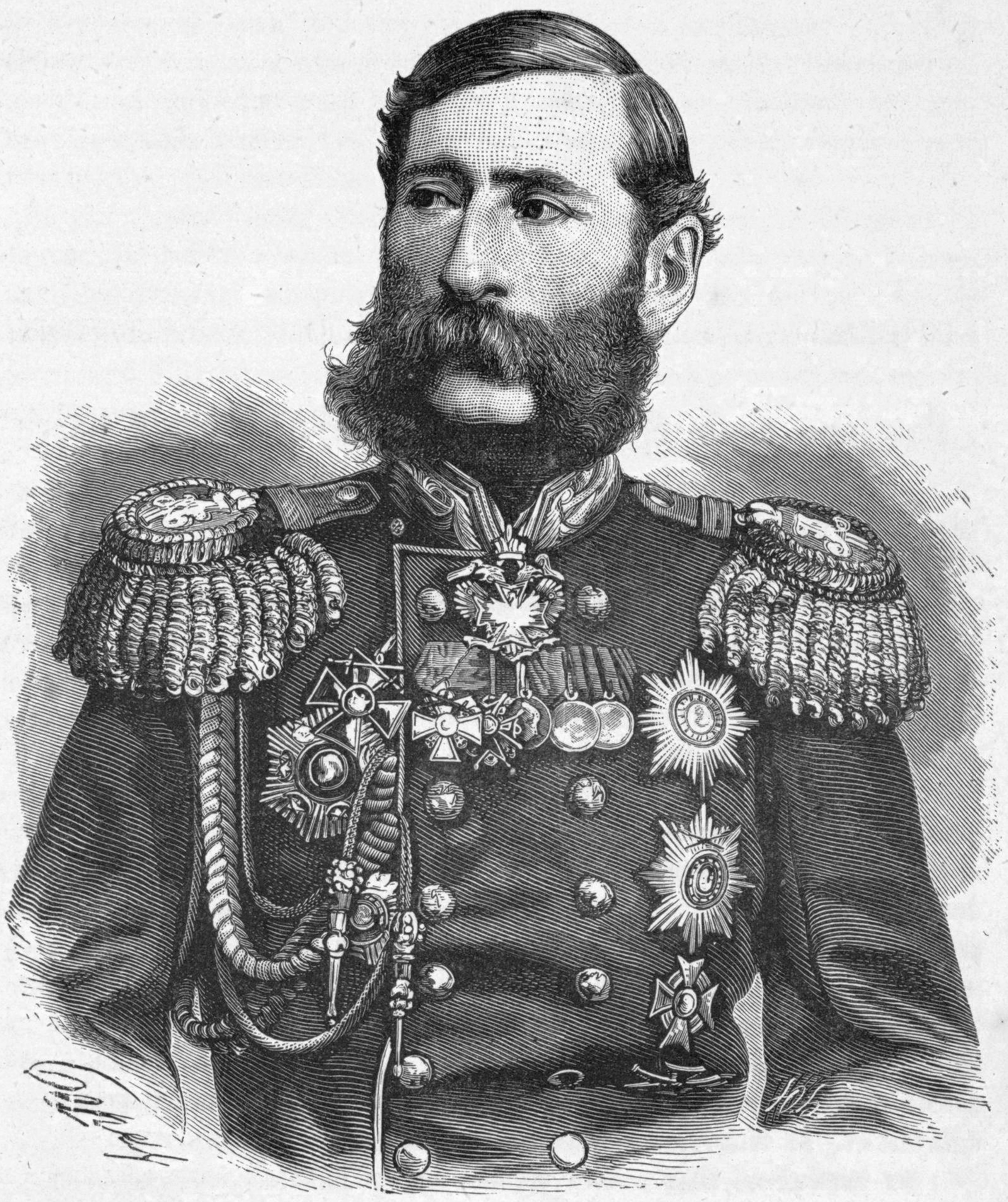
Mikhail Loris-Melikov, General of the Cavalry, Minister of the Interior of Russian Empire (1880–1881)

- Alexander Suvorov (1730–1800), Russian general and military theorist in the service of the Russian Empire
- Vasili Bebutov (1791–1856), an Imperial Russian general
- Ivan Abamelik (1768–1828), Major general of lejb-guards of artillery
- David Semyonovich Abamelik (1774–1833), participated to the wars against Napoleon
- Valerian Madatov (1782–1829), general
- Mikhail Lazarev (1788–1851), fleet commander and explorer
- Lazar Serebryakov (1795–1862), admiral
- Ivan Lazarev (1820–1879), Lieutenant General
- Yakov Alkhazov (1826–1896), Russian military leader, infantry general
- Boris Shelkovnikov (1837–1878), General of imperial Russian army
- Arshak Ter-Gukasov (1819–1881), Lieutenant General
- Mikhail Loris-Melikov (1825–1888), General of the Cavalry, Russian Minister of Interior
- Ivan Delyanov (1818–1897), Major-General of the Russian Imperial Army
- Tovmas Nazarbekian (1855–1931), Russian and later Armenian general
- Daniel Bek-Pirumyan (1861–1921)
- Christophor Araratov (1876–1937)

=== Armenian national liberation movement, First Republic of Armenia ===
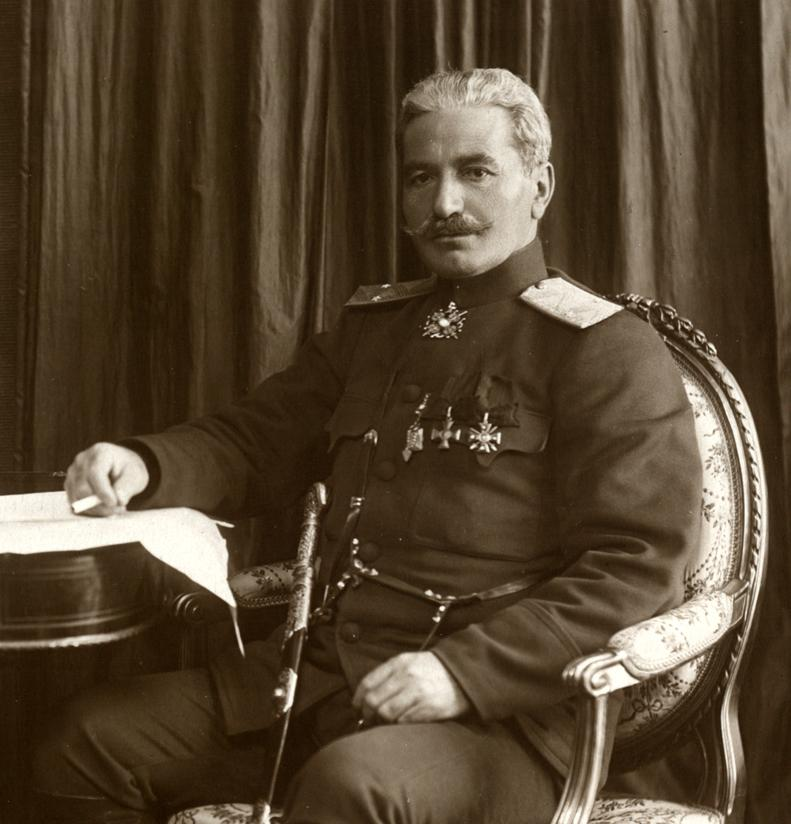
Andranik Ozanyan, military commander. From the late 19th century to the early 20th century, he was one of the main Armenian leaders of military efforts for the independence of Armenia

- Serob Aghpur, fedayee
- Galust Aloyan, fedayee
- Andranik, fedayee
- Arabo, fedayee
- Hovsep Arghutian, fedayee
- Poghos Bek-Pirumyan
- Hampartsoum Boyadjian, fedayee
- Kevork Chavush, fedayee
- Mihran Damadian, fedayee
- Hrayr Dzhoghk, fedayee
- Ishkhan, fedayee
- Sarkis Jebejian, fedayee
- Hovhannes Hakhverdyan
- Balabekh Karapet, fedayee
- Drastamat Kanayan, fedayee
- Balabekh Karapet, fedayee
- Keri, fedayee
- Yeprem Khan, considered a national hero in Iran
- Khetcho, fedayee
- Makhluto, fedayee
- Sebastatsi Murad, fedayee
- Satenik Matinian-Arghutian
- Garegin Nzhdeh
- Hamazasp Srvandztyan
- Ruben Ter-Minasian
- Armenak Yekarian

=== Soviet period ===
During World War II 500,000 Armenians served in the war from Soviet Union, 108 Armenians honoured Hero of Soviet Union, Armenians have 4 Marshals, 8 Colonel generals, 31 Lieutenant generals, 109 Major general, 1 Admiral, 3 Vice Admirals

Armenian Marshals of the Soviet Union

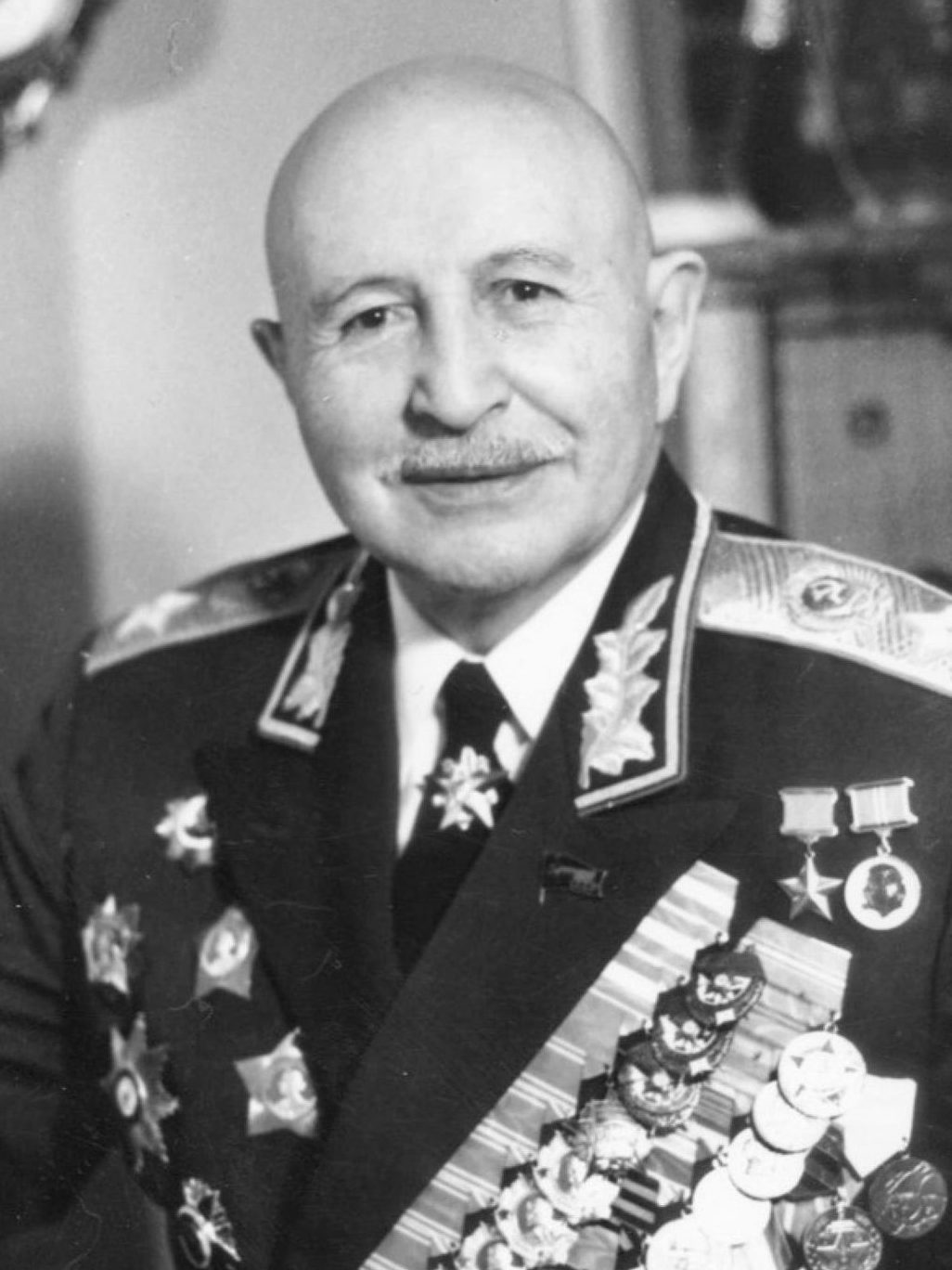
Ivan Bagramyan

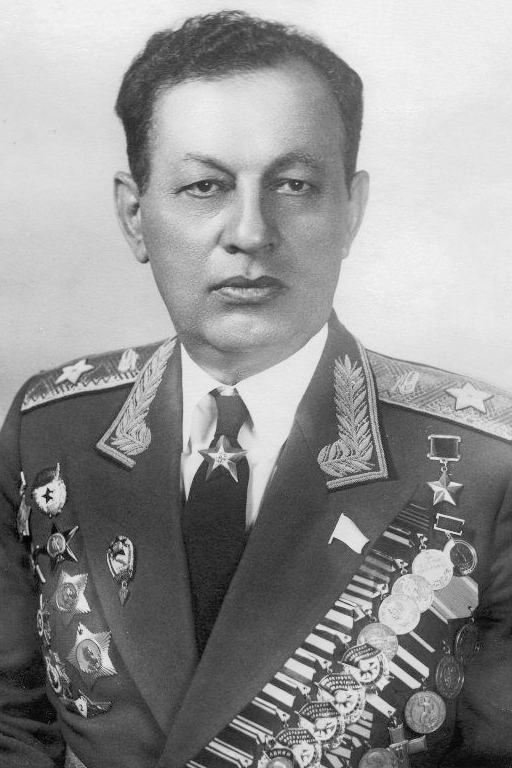
Hamazasp Babadzhanian

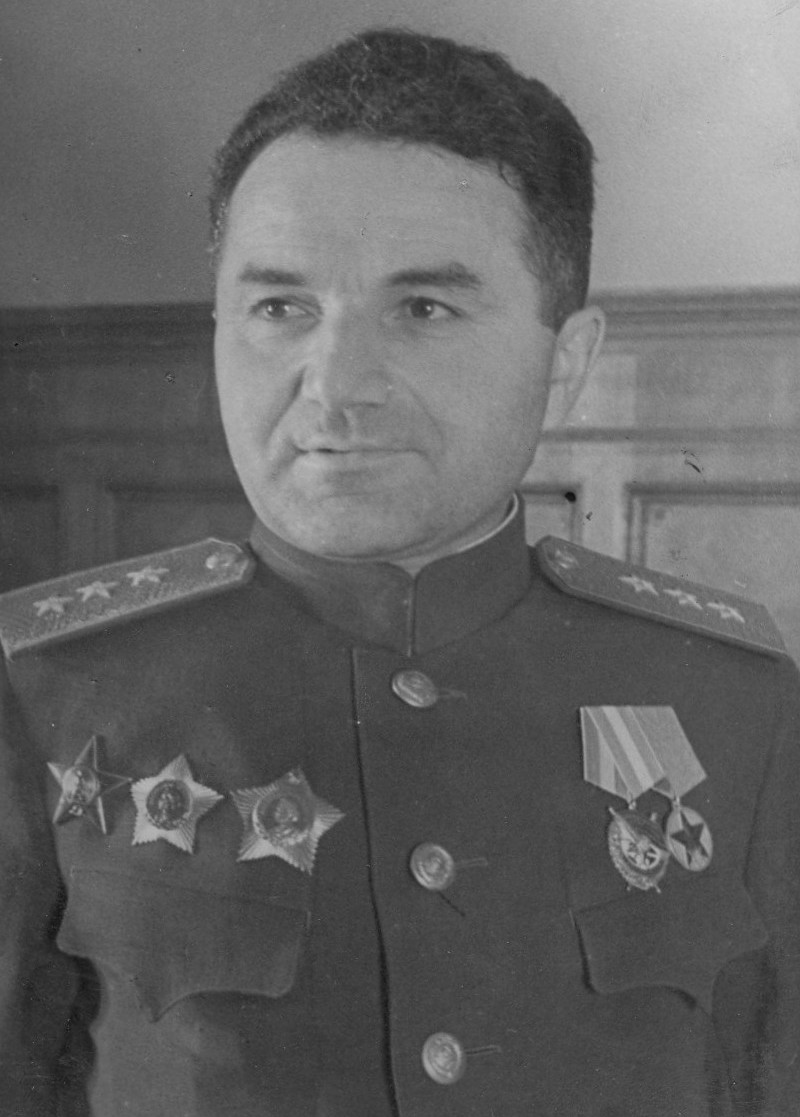
Sergei Khudyakov

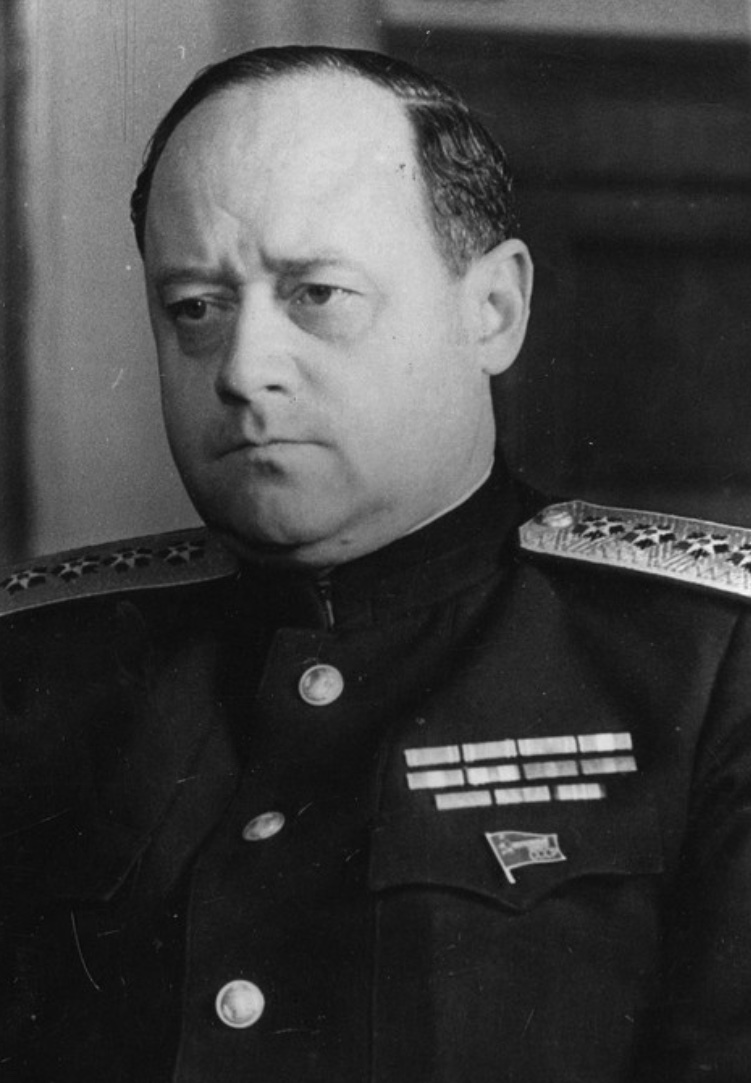
Ivan Isakov

- Hayk Bzhishkyan (1887–1937), Comcor (Commander of the Corps)
- Sergei Khudyakov (1902–1950), Marshal of Aviation
- Ivan Isakov (1894–1967), Admiral of the Fleet of the Soviet Union
- Hamazasp Babadzhanian (1906–1977), Chief Marshal of the Armored Forces
- Ivan Bagramyan (1897–1982), Marshal of the Soviet Union
- Sergey Aganov (1917–1996), Marshal of Engineer Troops
- Hmayak Babayan (1901–1945), a Red Army major general and a Hero of the Soviet Union
- Nver Safarian (1907-1982), Major general of Soviet Union and Commander of 89th Rifle Division
- Ghukas Madoyan (1906–1975), Red Army Lieutenant Colonel
- Nelson Stepanyan (1913–1944), Hero of Soviet Union, twice
- Sarkis Martirosyan (1900–1984), was a Soviet general-leytenant of the Red Army
- Sergei Galadzhev (1902–1954), was a Soviet general and a political officer
- Bogdan Kobulov (1904–1953), senior member of the Soviet security
- Hunan Avetisyan (1914–1943), was a Soviet Red Army senior sergeant from the 89th Rifle Division
- Ivan Agayants (1911–1968), leading Soviet NKVD/KGB intelligence officer
- Gevork Vartanian (1924–2012), Soviet intelligence officer
- Gaik Ovakimian (1898–1967), was a leading Soviet NKVD spy in the United States

=== United States ===
- George Juskalian (1914–2010), Colonel of the United States Army
- Carl Genian (1921–1967), aerial bombardier, first lieutenant in the United States Army Air Forces during World War II.
- Ernest H. Dervishian (1916–1984), soldier and a recipient of the United States military's highest decoration, the Medal of Honor
- Sue Sarafian Jehl (1917–1997), one of the best known WAAC personnel
- Paul Ignatius (1920–2025), Secretary of the Navy
- John Kizirian (1928–2006), served during World War II, the Korean War, and the Vietnam War
- Jeffrey L. Harrigian (born 1962), United States Air Force General, commander of U.S. Air Forces in Europe and U.S. Air Forces Africa

=== Diaspora ===
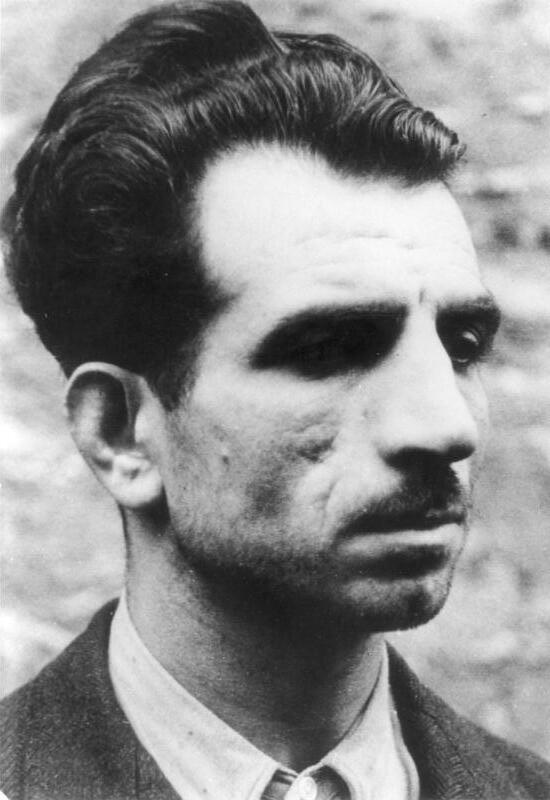
Missak Manouchian, considered a hero of the French Resistance

- Mihail Cerchez, Romanian general
- Tsatur Khan, was an Iranian general, envoy to Russia
- Martiros Khan Davidkhanian, Iranian general, philanthropist, professor, the Chief of Staff of the Persian Cossack Brigade
- Gabriel Coury, recipient of the Victoria Cross
- Eskandar Khan Davidkhanian, general, professor, the Deputy Commander of the Persian Cossack Brigade
- Alexander Khan Setkhanian, Iranian general, the Chief of Staff of the Cossack Brigade
- Dénes Lukács, Hungarian army and artillery commander
- János Czetz, prominent Hungarian freedom fighter
- Iacob Zadik, Romanian artillery and infantry commander
- Sarkis Torossian, decorated Ottoman captain who fought in the Gallipoli Campaign
- Jacobo Harrotian, general who participated in the Mexican Revolution
- Meguertitch Khan Davidkhanian, Iranian general, politician, statesman
- Jack Agazarian, agent for the United Kingdom's clandestine Special Operations Executive
- Missak Manouchian, was an Armenian poet and communist activist. Hero of France
- Hrant Maloyan, General officer of the Syrian army
- Aram Karamanoukian, Lieutenant General of the Syrian Army
- Sergei Avakyants, Russian retired naval officer
- Vagharshak Kosyan, Hero of Abkhazia
- Galust Trapizonyan, Hero of Abkhazia
- Ruben Yesayan, test pilot, Hero of the Russian Federation

=== First Nagorno-Karabakh War ===
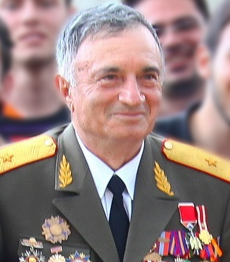
Arkady Ter-Tadevosyan, the Armenian military leader at the capture of Shushi in May 1992

- Simon Achikgyozyan (1939–1991), considered a hero in Armenia
- Samvel Babayan (born 1965), became a hero among Armenians for the military victories achieved under his command
- Gurgen Dalibaltayan (1926–2015), colonel-general, National Hero of Armenia
- Garo Kahkejian (born 1962), first Armenian from the diaspora who volunteered to go and fight in the Artsakh conflict
- Tatul Krpeyan (born 1965), leader of paramilitary units in Getashen and Martunashen villages in Shahumyan District of Nagorno-Karabakh Autonomous Oblast
- Mikael Harutyunyan (born 1946), 7th Defence Minister
- Kristapor Ivanyan (1920–1999), fought in both World War II and the First Nagorno-Karabakh War
- Monte Melkonian (1957–1993), Armenian-American revolutionary, National Hero of Armenia
- Seyran Ohanyan (born 1962), Minister of Defence of the Republic of Armenia
- Vazgen Sargsyan (1959–1999), military commander and politician, and was the first Defence Minister of Armenia
- Sedrak Saroyan (born 1967), general and politician who served in the Parliament of Armenia
- Vardan Stepanyan (born 1966), he is considered a hero in Armenia
- Norat Ter-Grigoryants (born 1936), lieutenant-general who played a leading role in developing the Armed Forces of Armenia
- Arkady Ter-Tadevosyan (1939–2021), also known by his nom-de-guerre Komandos

== Religious leaders ==
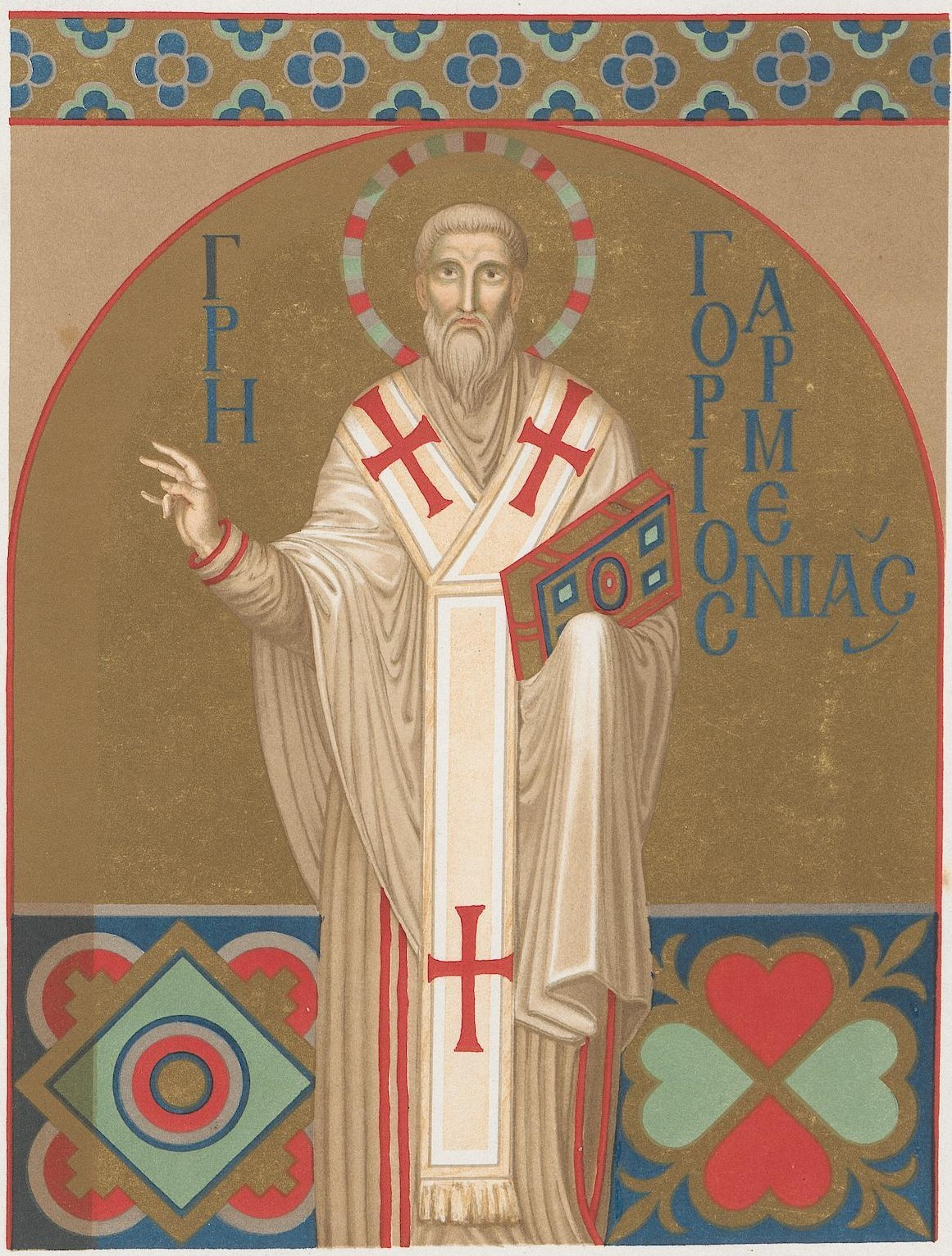
Gregory the Illuminator lost icon from Hagia Sophia

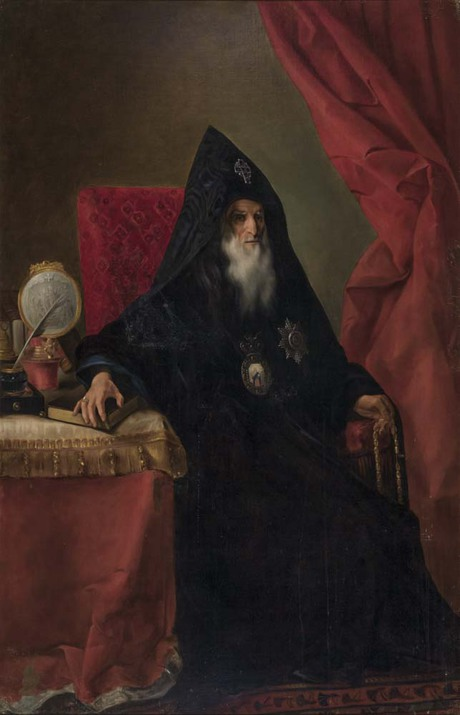
Nerses V Ashtaraketsi portriet

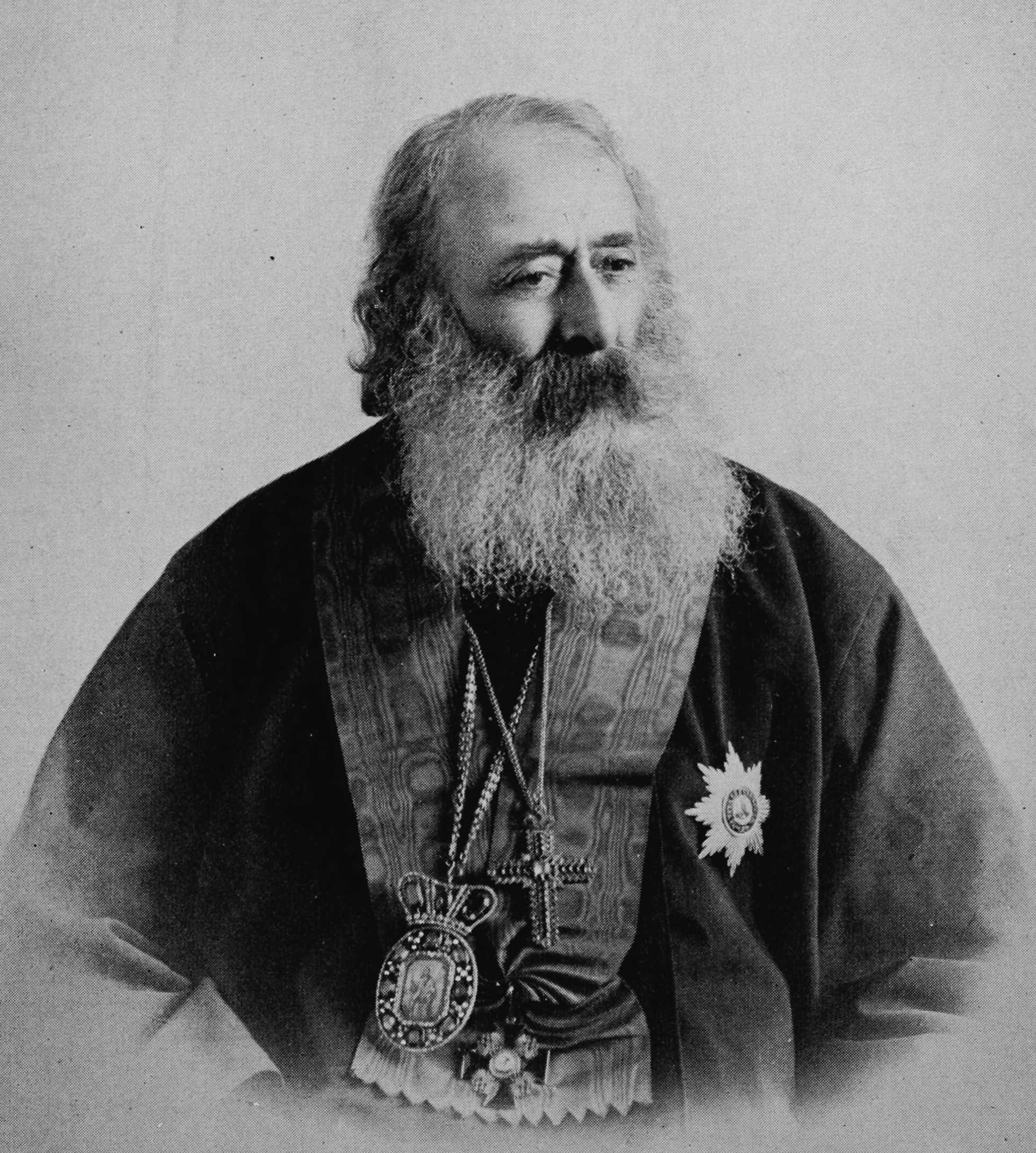
Mkrtich Khrimian (Khrimyan hayrik)

- Gregory the Illuminator (c. 257 – c. 328), founder and first official head of the Armenian Apostolic Church, venerated as a saint in the Armenian Apostolic Church and in some other churches
- Elisæus of Albania (d. 74 or 79), first patriarch of the Church of Caucasian Albania
- Hripsime (d. 290), she and her companions in martyrdom are venerated as some of the first Christian martyrs of Armenia
- Saint Parthenius (d. 3rd century), venerated in both the Catholic and Orthodox churches
- Minias, venerated as the first Christian martyr of Florence
- Chrysolius (d. probably 300), the patron saint of Komen/Comines, today in Belgium and France
- Emilianus of Trevi (d. 304), bishop of Trevi, martyred under Diocletian
- Saint Blaise (d. 316), venerated as a Christian saint and martyr, he is counted as one of the Fourteen Holy Helpers
- Khosrovidukht (d. 4th century), princess of the Arsacid dynasty of Armenia
- Grigoris (d. 334), Catholicos of the Church of Caucasian Albania from 325 to 330
- Sargis the General (d. 362 or 363), revered as a martyr and military saint in the Armenian Apostolic Church
- Nerses I (d. 373), Catholicos of all Armenians who lived in the fourth century
- Saint Servatius (d. 384), is patron saint of the city of Maastricht and the towns of Schijndel and Grimbergen
- Isaac of Armenia (c. 350 – c. 428), Catholicos of all Armenians, supported Mesrop Mashtots in the creation of the Armenian alphabet
- Leontine martyrs (5th century)
- Euthymius the Great (377–473), venerated in both Roman Catholic and Eastern Orthodox Churches
- Saint Shushanik (440–475), canonized by the Georgian Orthodox Church and is venerated by the Armenian Apostolic Church
- John the Silent (454–558), Christian saint known for living alone for seventy-six years
- Nerses III the Builder, was the Catholicos of the Armenian Apostolic Church
- Lazarus Zographos (810–865), first saint to be canonized specifically as an iconographer
- John VII of Constantinople (d. 867), was Ecumenical Patriarch of Constantinople
- Photios I of Constantinople (810–893), orthodox patriarch, a central figure in Christianization of Kievan Rus
- David of Bulgaria (d. 976), was a Bulgarian noble
- Gregory of Narek (c. 950 – 1003 or 1011), saint in the Armenian Apostolic and Catholic Churches and was declared a Doctor of the Church
- Simeon of Mantua (d. 1016), Benedictine monk, canonized as a saint
- Nerses IV the Gracious (1102–1173), Catholicos of Armenia, called "the Fénelon of Armenia" for his efforts to draw the Armenian church out of isolation
- Nerses of Lambron (1153–1198), was the Archbishop of Tarsus in the Armenian Kingdom of Cilicia
- Vardan of Aygek (d. 1250), Christian monk, famous for his works on Armenian folklore
- Stepanos Orbelian (1250 or 1260–1303), historian and the metropolitan bishop of the province of Syunik
- Mkhitar Sebastatsi (1676–1749), monk, scholar and theologian who founded the Mekhitarist Order
- Abraham Petros I Ardzivian (1679–1749), founder of the Armenian Catholic Church and its first Catholicos-Patriarch
- Hovsep Arghutian (1743–1801), archbishop who served as the religious leader of Armenians in the Russian Empire
- Franciszek Ksawery Zachariasiewicz (1770–1855), Polish Roman Catholic bishop of Przemyśl
- Nerses V (1770–1857), the Catholicos of the Armenian Apostolic Church
- Yaqub Abcarius (1781—1845), bishop and public figure
- Andon Bedros IX Hassoun (1809–1884), prelate of the Armenian Catholic Church, who was the Patriarch of Cilicia
- Mkrtich Khrimian (1820–1907), leader, educator, and publisher who served as Catholicos of All Armenians
- Matthew II Izmirlian (1845–1910), Catholicos of All Armenians of the Armenian Apostolic Church at the Mother See of Holy Etchmiadzin
- Stefano P. Israelian (1866-1915), Armenian Catholic Bishop of Kharput, martyr
- St. Ignatius Maloyan (1869–1915), Armenian Catholic Archbishop of Mardin, martyr
- Malachia Ormanian (1841–1918), Armenian Patriarch of Constantinople
- George V of Armenia (1847–1930), the Catholicos of All Armenians, supported the various military campaigns
- Hagop Shahveledian (1856–1931), Armenian Protestant pastor, public figure, and journalist
- Louis Cheikho (1859–1927), Jesuit Chaldean Catholic priest, Orientalist and Theologian
- Yeghishe Tourian (1860–1930), Armenian Patriarch of Jerusalem, appointed honorary Knight Commander of the Order of the British Empire
- Karekin I (1867–1952), scholar of Armenian art and Catholicos of Cilicia of the Armenian Apostolic Church
- Khoren I of Armenia (1873–1938), served as Catholicos of All Armenians, murdered by the NKVD, the Soviet secret police
- George VI of Armenia (1868–1954), the Catholicos of the Armenian Apostolic Church
- Pavel Florensky (1882–1937), a Russian Orthodox theologian, priest, philosopher, inventor, polymath, neomartyr and folk saint
- Gregorio Pietro Agagianian (1895–1971), Armenian cardinal of the Catholic Church, was the first serious non-Italian papal candidate in centuries
- Vazgen I (1908–1994), Catholicos of All Armenians for a total of 39 years, 1st National Hero of Armenia
- Demos Shakarian (1913–1993), founder of Full Gospel Businessmen's Fellowship International
- Karekin I (1932–1999), served as the Catholicos of the Armenian Apostolic Church
- Karekin II (b. 1951), Catholicos of All Armenians, unanimously elected the Oriental Orthodox head of the World Council of Churches

== Cultural figures ==
=== Activists ===
- Yelena Bonner (1923–2011), human rights activist
- Movses Gorgisyan (1961–1990), one of the leaders of the Nagorno-Karabakh movement
- Marietta Shaginyan (1888–1982), one of the most prolific communist writers experimenting in satirico-fantastic fiction
- Serhiy Nigoyan (1993–2014), Euromaidan activist, first protester killed by shooting during the protest

=== Architects ===
- Grigor Aghababyan (1911–1977), Soviet Armenian architect
- Mihran Azaryan (1876–1952), an Ottoman and Turkish architect
- Balyan family, family in the Ottoman Empire of court architects in the service of Ottoman sultans
- Nikolai Bayev (1875–1952), mainly worked in Baku in the 1910s and in Soviet Armenia
- Léon Gurekian (1871–1950), made contributions in Bulgaria, Ottoman Empire and Italy
- Karo Halabyan (1897–1959), Soviet architect, led the development of the recovery plan of Stalingrad
- Varazdat Harutyunyan (1909–2008), academic, architect and writer
- Rafayel Israyelian (1908–1973), Soviet architect, most prominent structures, including the Sardarapat Memorial and Yerevan Wine Factory
- Kegham Kavafyan (1888–1959), Ottoman architect who designed Süreyya Opera House
- Miron Merzhanov (1895–1975), Soviet architect, notable for being the de facto personal architect of Joseph Stalin
- Mihran Mesrobian (1889–1975), architect whose career spanned over fifty years and in several countries
- Momik (d. 1333), architect, sculptor and a master artist of Armenian illuminated manuscripts
- Odo of Metz (742–814), architect who lived during Charlemagne's reign in the Carolingian Empire
- Alexander Rotinoff (1875–1934), architect and engineer of late 19th and early 20th century throughout the Caucasus
- Vartan Sarkisov (1875–1955), was a Soviet architect, designed the Oil Producers Sanatorium building in Mardakan
- Mimar Sinan (c. 1490–1588), chief Ottoman architect during the reigns of sultans Suleiman I, Selim II, and Murad III (Armenian origin is debated by some scholars)
- Alexander Tamanian (1878–1936), Russian-born neoclassical architect, well known for his work in the city of Yerevan
- Gabriel Ter-Mikelov (1874–1949), one of the main architects of the Saint Thaddeus and Bartholomew Armenian Cathedral
- Todos (6th—7th centuries), ancient architect, who built a series of Churches in Armenia and Georgia, completed Anteni Soni
- Toros Toramanian (1864–1934), He is considered the father of Armenian architectural historiography
- Trdat (940s–1020), was the chief architect of the Bagratid kings of Armenia, and most notable for his design of the cathedral at Ani and his reconstruction of the dome of Hagia Sophia in Constantinople

=== Artists ===
==== Painters ====
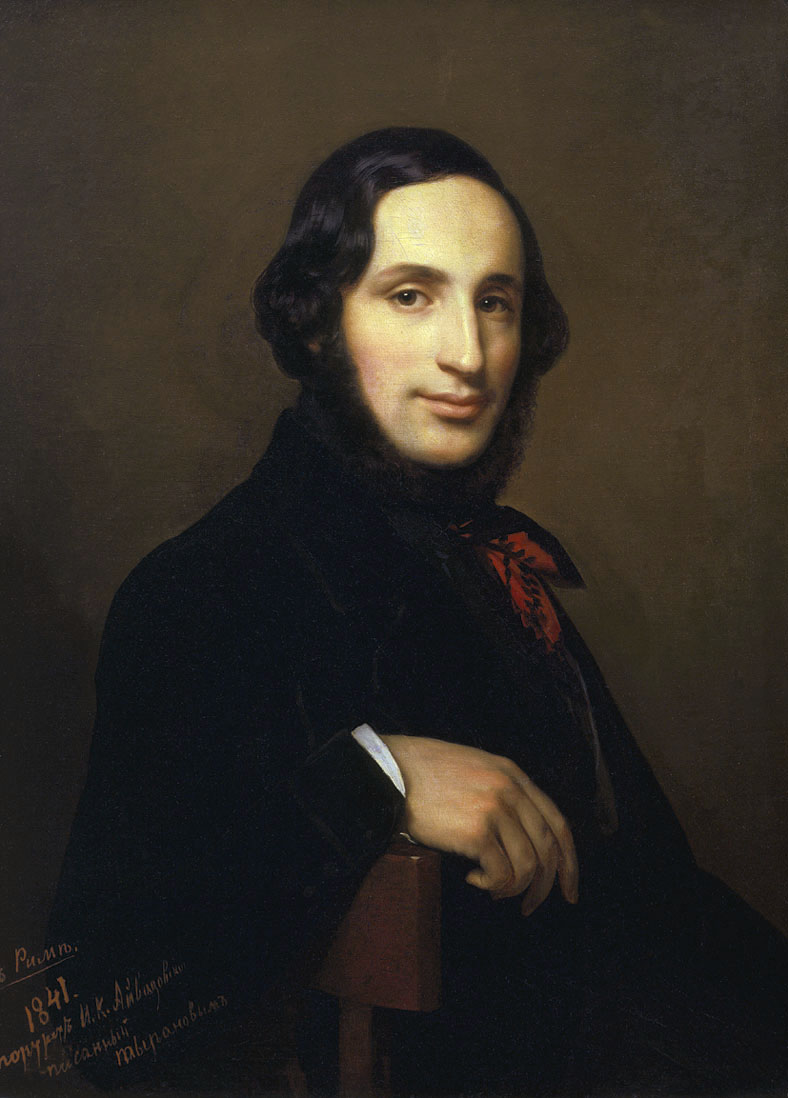
Ivan Aivazovsky, considered one of the greatest masters of marine art

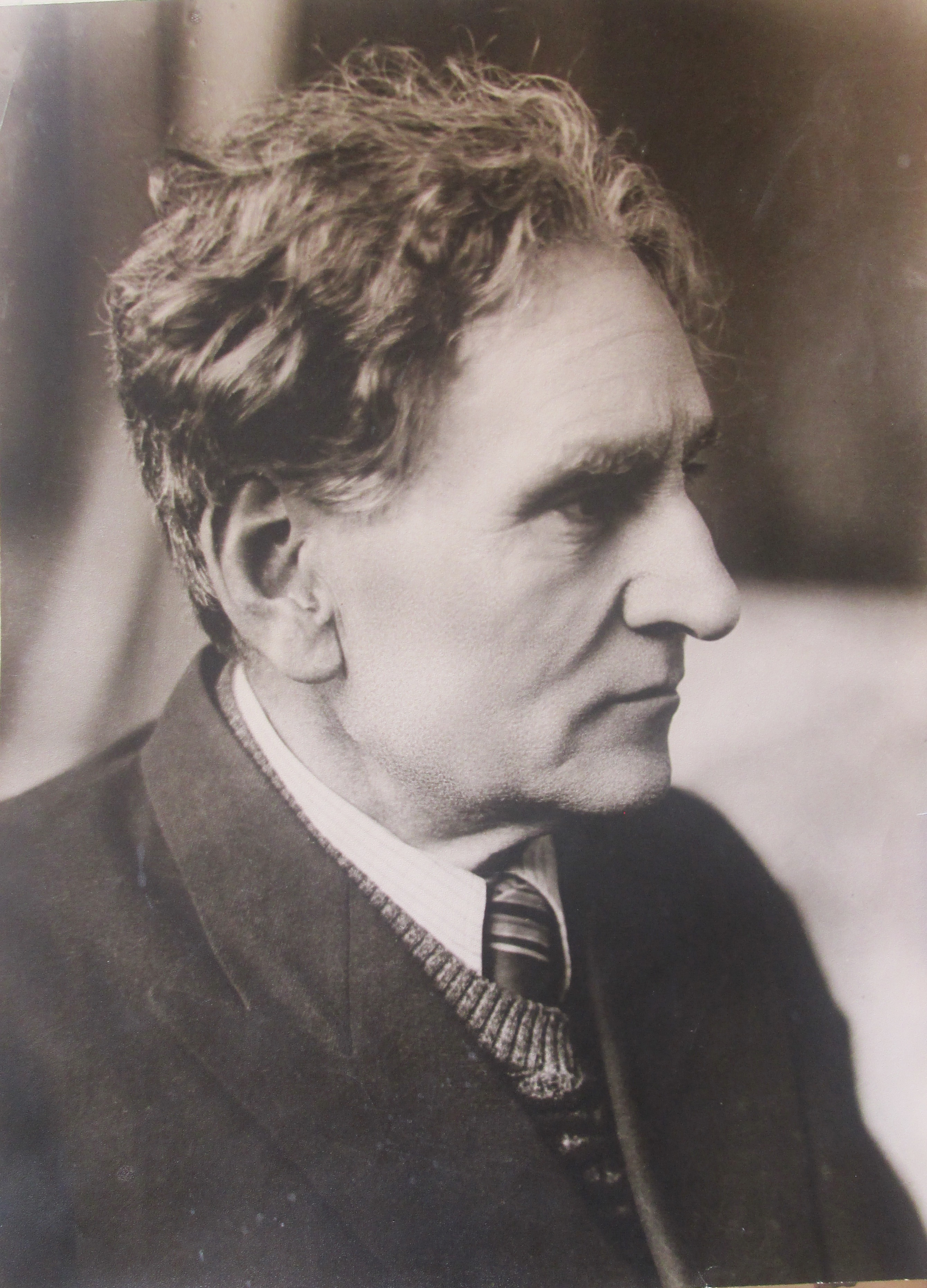
Martiros Saryan, founder of a modern Armenian national school of painting

- Ivan Aivazovsky (1817–1900), Romantic painter who is considered one of the greatest masters of marine art
- Simon Agopian (1857–1921), prominent Ottoman Armenian landscape and portrait painter
- Stepan Aghajanian (1863–1940), painter; known primarily for portraits and landscapes
- Yuhanna al-Armani, artist in Ottoman Egypt, he is most notable for his religious works
- Minas Avetisyan (1928–1975), one of the best-known Armenian painters of the Soviet Union
- Teodor Axentowicz (1859–1938), rector of the Academy of Fine Arts in Kraków
- Gevorg Bashinjaghian (1857–1925), painter who had significant influence on Armenian landscape painting
- David Çıraciyan (1839–1907), prominent Ottoman painter
- Mıgırdiç Civanyan (1848–1906), Ottoman Armenian painter
- Sarkis Diranian (1854–1938), Ottoman orientalist painter
- Arshile Gorky (1904–1948), has been hailed as one of the most powerful American painters of the 20th century
- Hakob Hovnatanyan (1806–1881), founder of the modern Armenian painting school
- Eduard Isabekyan (1914–2007), founder of thematic compositional genre in Armenia
- Jean Jansem (1920–2013), was a French-Armenian painter
- Nina Katchadourian, American interdisciplinary artist
- Hakob Kojoyan (1883–1959), was an artist assisted Armenian architect Alexander Tamanian in creating the coat of arms for the First Republic of Armenia
- Levon Lachikyan (born 1955), art critic and graphic artist
- Manas family, family that provided Imperial Portraitists to the Sultans of the Ottoman Empire
- Vahram Manavyan (1880–1952), Ottoman and Egyptian painter
- Dmitry Nalbandyan (1906–1993), Soviet painter and animator
- Yenovk Nazarian (1868–1928), portrait and landscape painter
- Stepanos Nersissian (1815–1884), painter, primarily known for his portraits of historical figures
- Hovsep Pushman (1877–1966), known for his contemplative still lifes and sensitive portraits of women
- Jan Rustem (1762–1835), painter, worked in the territories of the Polish–Lithuanian Commonwealth
- Bogdan Saltanov (c. 1630–1703), painter at the court of Alexis I of Russia and his successors
- Martiros Saryan (1880–1972), painter and founder of a modern Armenian national school of painting
- Vardges Sureniants (1860–1921), considered the founder of Armenian historical painting
- Antoni Stefanowicz (1858–1929), Polish painter and art teacher, specializing in portraits
- Kajetan Stefanowicz (1886–1920), Polish Art-Nouveau painter and illustrator
- Jerzy Siemiginowski-Eleuter (c. 1660–1711), painter to king John III Sobieski and a Polish–Lithuanian noble
- Yeghishe Tadevosyan (1870–1936), painter, was known for his landscape and portrait paintings
- Panos Terlemezian (1865–1941), landscape and portrait painter
- Garabet Yazmaciyan (1868–1929), prominent Ottoman painter
- Jwan Yosef (born 1984), painter and artist
- Hovhannes Zardaryan (1918–1992), Soviet painter
- Sarkis Zabunyan (born 1938), conceptual artist

==== Animators ====
- Robert Sahakyants (1950–2009), animator and Honored Artist of Armenia
- Lev Atamanov (1905–1981), one of the foremost Soviet animation film directors and one of the founders of Soviet animation art
- Ross Bagdasarian, Jr., animator, filmmaker, and voice actor known for work on Alvin and the Chipmunks
- Dmitry Nalbandyan (1906–1993), Soviet painter and animator and Hero of Socialist Labour

==== Illustrators ====
- Jean Carzou (1907–2000)
- Toros Roslin (1210–1270)
- Edgar Chahine (1874–1947)
- Jicka
- Nonny Hogrogian (1932–2024)
- Mesrop of Khizan
- Grigor Khanjyan (1926–2000)
- Levon Manaseryan (1925–2019)
- Sargis Pitsak

==== Sculptors ====
- Sargis Baghdasaryan (1923–2001)
- Ghukas Chubaryan (1923–2009) He authored numerous works that later became symbols of the Armenian capital.
- Hakob Gyurjian (1881–1948) He was the author of over 300 sculpture portraits and his famous work includes (Feodor Chaliapin, Sergei Rachmaninoff, Ludwig van Beethoven, Vahan Terian, Martiros Saryan, Georgy Yakulov, etc.)
- Ara Harutyunyan (1928–1999) He is the creator of monumental statue Mother Armenia installed on the heights of Yerevan, which became one of the most popular symbols of Armenia.
- Mihran Hakobyan (born 1984) He created the 2014 Wikipedia Monument in Słubice, the first dedicated to the online encyclopedia.
- Hagop Ishkanian (born 1938) his notable work includes Tsoghik (granite) this work was awarded the first place gold medal in the Republic festival.
- Rafik Khachatryan (1937–1993) his work includes sculptures and memorial complexes made for the martyred freedom fighters. His works are exhibited in many foreign countries including Portugal, Bulgaria, Romania, Czechia, Slovakia, and Germany.
- Yervand Kochar (1899–1979) was a prominent sculptor and modern artist of the twentieth century and a founder of Painting in Space art movement.
- Haig Patigian (1876–1950) his impressive work includes the McKinley statue (1906), Arcata, California (removed February 28, 2019 and moved to Canton, Ohio)
- Ara Sargsyan (1902–1969) his awards include Honored Art Worker of the Armenian SSR (1935), Two Orders of the Badge of Honour (1939, 1945), People's Painter of the Armenian SSR (1950), Order of the Red Banner of Labour (1956), People's Painter of the USSR (1963), State Prize of the Armenian SSR (1971, posthumously), Medal "For the Defence of the Caucasus", and Medal "For Valiant Labour in the Great Patriotic War 1941–1945".
- Stephen Sacklarian (1899–1983) Sacklarian's works are in the permanent collection of over 60 museums worldwide.
- Ara Shiraz (1941–2014) Shiraz's paintings and sculptures are found in many private collections throughout the world: Moscow, St. Petersburg, Tbilisi, Yerevan, Beirut, Paris, London, New York City, Los Angeles, Chicago, Detroit and Montreal.
- Yervant Voskan (1855–1914) He is the first known sculptor in modern Turkish sculpture history and as the first sculpture teacher at the Sanay-i Nefise he educated the first generation of Turkish sculptors

=== Ballet dancers ===
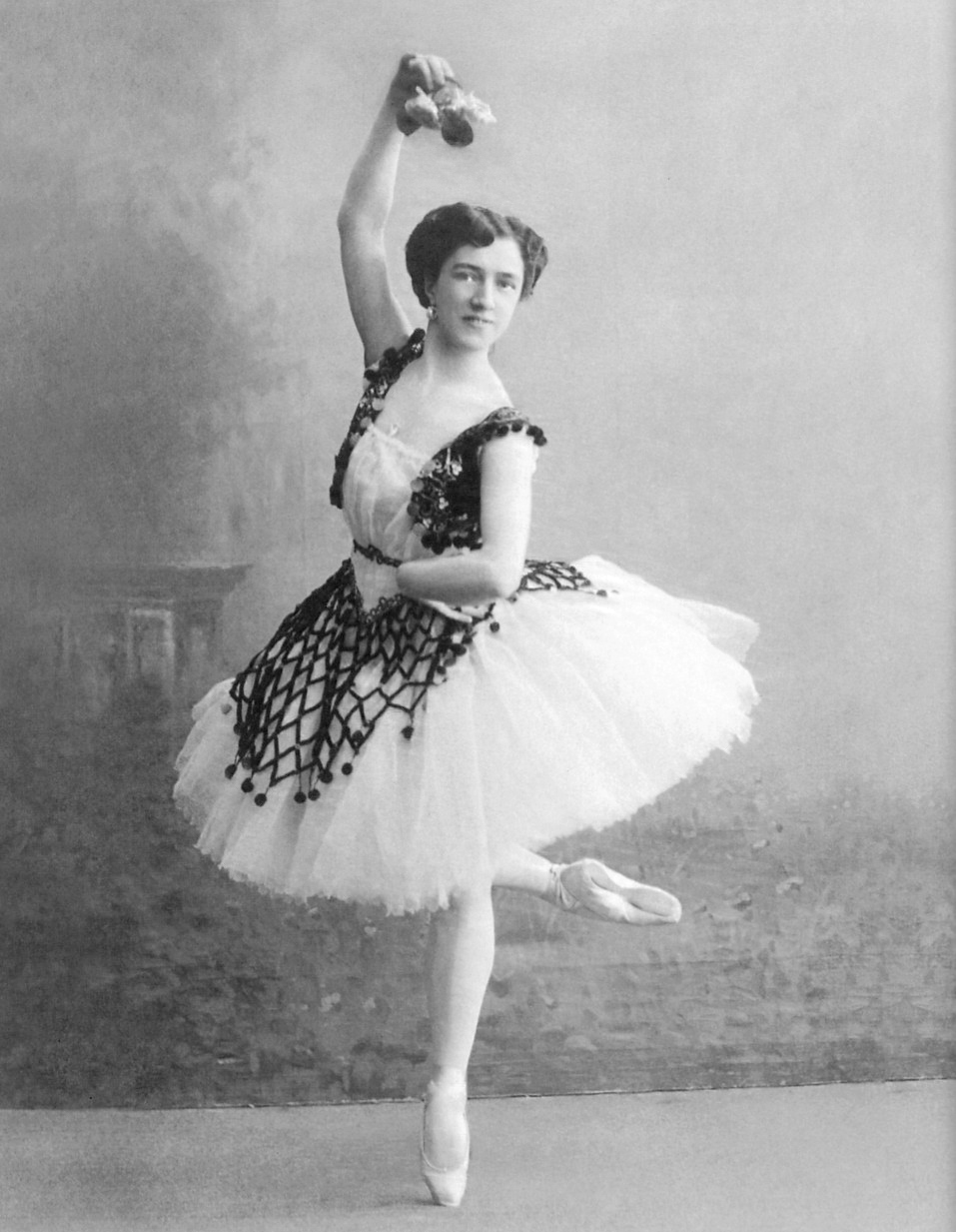
Agrippina Vaganova

- Agrippina Vaganova (1879–1951), her technique of ballet is one of the most popular techniques today
- Vilen Galstyan (1941–2021), he was popular in the former U.S.S.R. and especially in Armenia. He was awarded by the People's Artist of Armenia honorary title.[1]
- Vanoush Khanamirian (1927–2011)
- Rudolf Kharatyan (born 1947)
- Ruben Muradyan (born 1989)
- Tamara Tchinarova (1919–2017), she contributed significantly to the development of Australian dance companies and was a Russian–English interpreter for touring ballet companies

=== Cuisine ===
- Arto Der Haroutunian (1940—1987), chef, artist, and writer.
- George Duran (born 1975), chef and TV personality.
- Aram Mnatsakanov (born 1962), chef and host of the Russian and Ukrainian versions of Hell's Kitchen and Kitchen Nightmares.
- George Mardikian (1903–1977), restaurateur, chef, author and philanthropist.
- Carrie Nahabedian (born 1958), James Beard Foundation Award-winning chef and founder of the 1 Michelin star restaurant Naha.
- Geoffrey Zakarian (born 1959), celebrity chef

=== Journalists ===
- John Roy Carlson (1909–1991), best-selling author of Under Cover
- Kevork Ajemian (1932–1998), prominent Armenian writer, journalist, novelist, theorist and public activist, one of the founders of the ASALA military organization
- Nubar Alexanian (born 1950), photojournalist, documentary photographer, and film director
- Ben Bagdikian (1920–2016), former editor-in-chief of The Washington Post
- Hrant Dink (1954–2007), executive editor of Turkish-Armenian newspaper Agos
- George Donikian (born 1951), news anchor in Australia
- John Garabedian (born 1941), radio host
- Bedros Hadjian (1933–2012), writer, journalist and educator
- David Ignatius (born 1950), associate editor of the Washington Post
- Armen Keteyian (born 1953), reporter
- Stephen Kurkjian, two-time recipient of the Pulitzer Prize for Local Investigative Specialized Reporting.
- Tim Kurkjian (born 1956), analyst at ESPN
- Hrand Nazariantz (1880–1962), lived in Italy, Nobel Prize candidate
- Lara Setrakian (born 1982), journalist and political analyst for Bloomberg Television and ABC News
- Janet Shamlian (born 1962), NBC News correspondent
- Margarita Simonyan (born 1980), editor-in-chief of RT (Russia Today)
- Roger Tatarian (1917–1995), senior VP of United Press International
- Philip Terzian (born 1950), editor at the Weekly Standard
- Matt Vasgersian (born 1967), sportscaster

=== Media ===
==== Actors ====
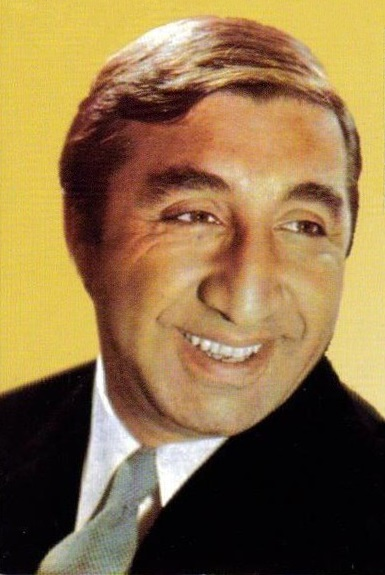
Mher Mkrtchyan, stage and film actor. Mkrtchyan is widely considered one of the greatest actors of the Soviet period among Armenians and the USSR as a whole

- Khoren Abrahamyan (1930–2004), actor and director, People's Artist of the USSR
- Grégoire Aslan (1908–1982), Swiss-Armenian actor and musician
- Fanny Ardant (Grandfather, born 1949), french actress, who is the recipient of numerous accolades, including two César Awards and a Lumière Award.
- Kay Armen (1915–2011), worked on stage and in radio, television, and film
- Ed Alberian (1920–1997), children's television actor and entertainer
- Mkrtich Arzumanyan (born 1976), actor, humorist, showman, screenwriter, and producer
- Charla Baklayan Faddoul (born 1976), Amazing Race season 5 contestant
- Richard Bakalyan (1931–2015), actor who started his career playing juvenile delinquents in his first several films
- Aracy Balabanian (1940–2023), Brazilian actress
- Mike Connors (1925–2017), American actor, who won the Golden Globe Award and was nominated for the Primetime Emmy Award.
- Pierre Chammassian (born 1949), comedian
- Armen Dzhigarkhanyan (1935–2020), was a Soviet, Armenian, and Russian actor
- Leslie Erganian (born 1957), artist and television personality
- Arlene Francis (1907–2001), American game show panelist, actress, radio and television talk show host
- Hasmik (1879–1947), was a Soviet actress
- Azniv Hrachia (1859–1920), actor and director
- Karren Karagulian, actor
- Khloé Kardashian (born 1984), television personality, socialite, actress, businesswoman, designer, model and social media influencer
- Bob Kevoian (born 1950), co-host of the Bob & Tom Show
- Karp Khachvankyan (1923–1998), actor and director, People's Artist of Armenia
- Murad Kostanyan (1902–1989), actor, People's Artist of Armenia
- David Malyan (1904–1976), Soviet film and stage actor
- Hayk Marutyan (born 1976), actor, comedian, screenwriter, producer, and was also the mayor of Yerevan from October 2018 to December 2021.
- Amasi Martirosyan (1897–1971), film director, screenwriter and actor
- Garik Martirosyan (born 1974), TV host and comedian
- Patrick Masbourian (born 1970), Canadian television personality
- Frunzik Mkrtchyan (1930–1993), Armenian film actor, People's Artist of the USSR
- Kev Orkian (born 1974), actor, musician and comedian
- Michael Omartian (born 1945), music producer of Donna Summer
- Richard Ouzounian (born 1950), Armenian by adoption; playwright, director, critic, artistic director
- Davit Gharibyan (born 1990), media personality, actor, director, producer, TV host, model and social media influencer
- Michael A. Goorjian (born 1971), actor, filmmaker, and writer, won an Emmy Award
- Alice Panikian (born 1985), 2006 Miss Universe Canada
- Vahram Papazian (1888–1968), was a Soviet actor, mostly known for his Shakespearean roles
- Yevgeny Petrosyan (born 1945), comedian
- Angela Sarafyan (born 1983), actress
- Andy Serkis (born 1964), English actor and filmmaker. He is best known for his motion capture roles
- Akim Tamiroff (1899–1972), One of the premier character actors of Classical Hollywood cinema
- Jano Toussounian (born 1991), Australian-Armenian actor
- Vache Tovmasyan (born 1986), actor
- Vagharsh Vagharshian (1894–1959), Soviet actor, director, playwright and public figure
- Yevgeny Vakhtangov (1883–1922), Russian actor and theatre director who founded the Vakhtangov Theatre
- Gor Vardanyan (born 1972), actor
- Leonid Yengibarov (1935–1972), Soviet actor and clown
- Yuri Yerznkyan (1922–1996), film director and actor
- Steven Zaillian (born 1953), screenwriter, producer

==== Filmmakers ====
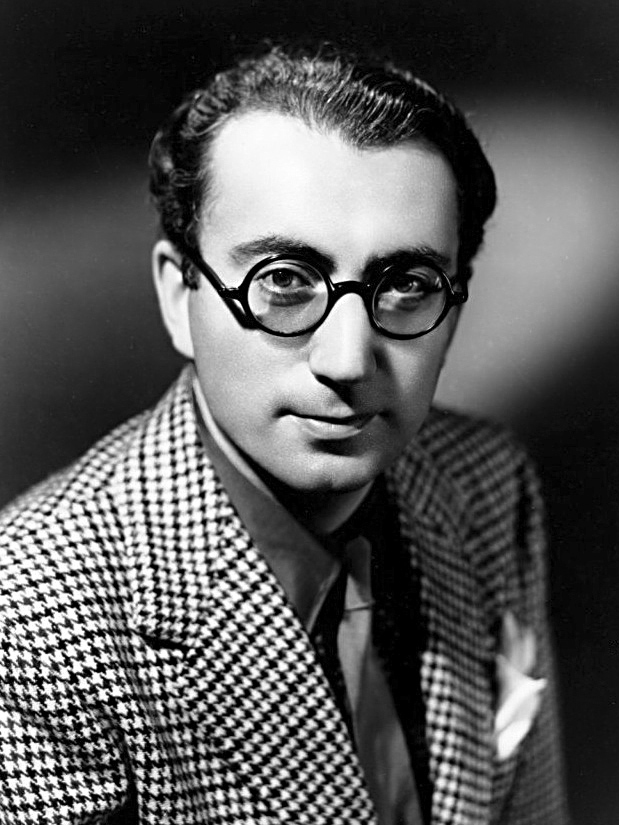
Rouben Mamoulian, an American film and theater director. Mamoulian's film Becky Sharp was selected by the Library of Congress for preservation in the National Film Registry

- Haig Acterian (1904–1943), Romanian film and theater director, critic, dramatist and journalist
- Hamo Beknazarian (1891–1965), was an Armenian film director, actor and screenwriter
- Frunze Dovlatyan (1927–1997), a film director, screenwriter and actor
- Atom Egoyan (born 1960), Canadian filmmaker
- J. Michael Hagopian (1913–2010), filmmaker
- Hughes Brothers, filmmakers
- Jerzy Kawalerowicz (1922–2007), Polish film director and politician, having been a member of Polish United Workers' Party
- Noura Kevorkian, filmmaker, writer, director, producer
- Edmond Keosayan (1936–1994), film director and compere of the State Variety Orchestra of the Soviet Union
- Vilen Kolouta (1930–1999), cinematographer
- Lev Kulidzhanov (1924–2002), Soviet film director, screenwriter and professor at the Gerasimov Institute of Cinematography
- Sergey Parajanov (1924–1990), he is regarded by film critics, film historians and filmmakers to be one of the best filmmakers in cinema history
- Artavazd Peleshyan (born 1938), director of essay films, a documentarian in the history of film art, a screenwriter, and a film theorist
- Henri Verneuil (1920–2002), was a French-Armenian playwright and filmmaker, who made a successful career in France
- Mikhail Vartanov (1937–2009), filmmaker
- Rouben Mamoulian (1897–1987), was an American film and theater director
- Tigran Khzmalyan (born 1963, aka Xmalian), filmmaker, screenwriter and producer
- Henrik Malyan (1925–1988), film writer and director
- Karen Shakhnazarov (born 1952), filmmaker, producer and head of the Mosfilm studios

==== Film and TV Producers ====
- Davit Gharibyan (born 1990), producer of Ari Parenq TV series, Happy International Women's Day and We Remember and Demand 106 social videos
- Howard Kazanjian (born 1942), producer of Star Wars
- Sev Ohanian (born 1987), producer of Searching, Fruitvale Station and the upcoming Space Jam: A New Legacy
- Natalie Qasabian, producer of Searching and Run
- Katherine Sarafian (born 1969), producer at Pixar
- Alain Terzian (born 1949), French producer, President of Association of French Producers
- Steven Zaillian (born 1953), won an Academy Award, a Golden Globe Award and a BAFTA Award for his screenplay Schindler's List

==== Social Media ====
- Patrick Bet-David (born 1978), media personality, political commentator, and podcast host.
- Ana Kasparian (born 1986), media personality and political commentator.
- Sona Movsesian (born 1982), assistant to Conan O'Brien, co-host of the podcast Conan O'Brien Needs a Friend.
- Anita Sarkeesian (born 1983), feminist media personality and critic, founder of the video series Tropes vs. Women in Video Games.

==== Television ====
- Aida Nersissyan, television presenter
- Leo Chaloukian, president of the Academy of Television Arts & Sciences

==== Theatre ====
- Hovhannes Abelian (1865–1936), actor, People's Artist of the Armenian SSR
- Petros Adamian (1849–1891), poet, writer, artist and public figure who worked in the Ottoman and Russian empires
- Güllü Agop, Ottoman theatre director as well as an occasional actor
- Vardan Ajemian (1905–1977), theatrical director and actor, Hero of Socialist Labour
- Nikita Balieff (1877–1936), vaudevillian, stage performer, writer, impresario, and director
- Olga Gulazyan (1886–1970), Soviet actress of film and theater
- Azniv Hrachia (1859–1920), Ottoman actress and director
- Verkine Karakashian (1856–1933), Ottoman actress and soprano
- Yeranuhi Karakashian (1848–1924), actress in Ottoman Empire
- Vladimir Nemirovich-Danchenko (1858–1943), Russian theatre director, writer, pedagogue
- Aghavni Papazian, first professional female actors in the Ottoman Empire and thereby the Middle East
- Arousyak Papazian, first professional female actor in the Ottoman Empire
- Yenovk Shahen (1881–1915), actor and director who lived in the Ottoman Empire
- Siranush (1857–1932), one of the few whose work is tied to an entire era of theatrical history
- Loreta (1911–1998), an Iranian stage and film actress

=== Models ===
==== Classic ====
- Anna Davidovna Abamelik-Lazareva (1814–1889), in her time, she was regarded as one of the most beautiful women in Russia

==== Modern ====
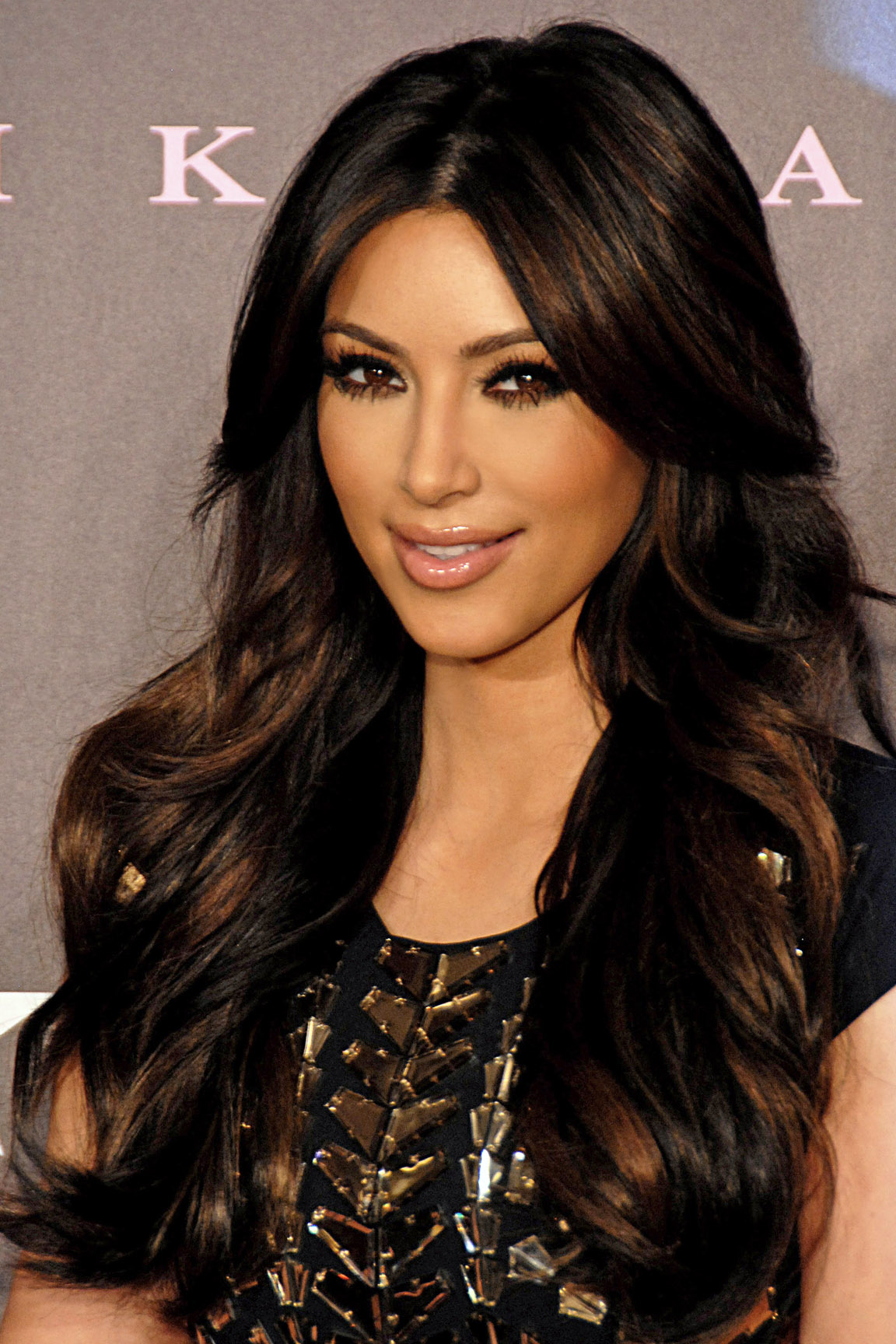
Kim Kardashian

- Kim Kardashian (born 1980), regarded as one of the most famous celebs in the world.
- Kourtney Kardashian (born 1979)
- Khloé Kardashian (born 1984)
- Gabrielė Martirosian (born 1991)
- Iveta Mukuchyan (born 1986)
- Anna Selezneva (born 1990), runway model.

=== Music ===
==== Composers ====
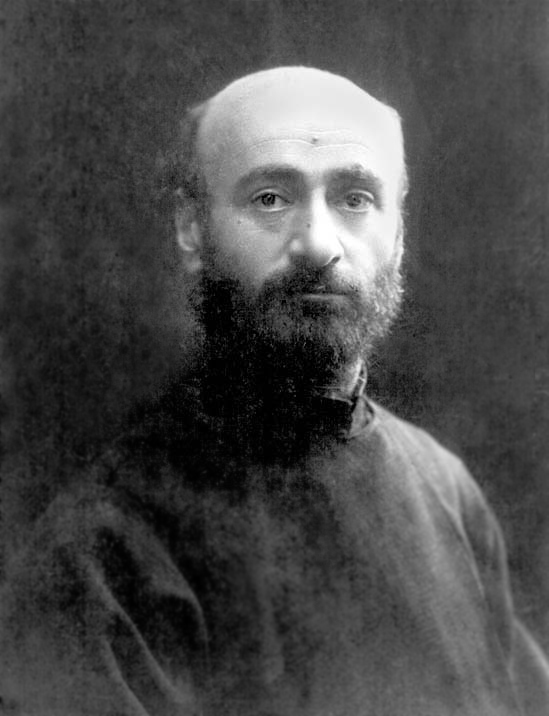
Komitas Vardapet, founder of the Armenian national school of music, one of the pioneers of ethnomusicology

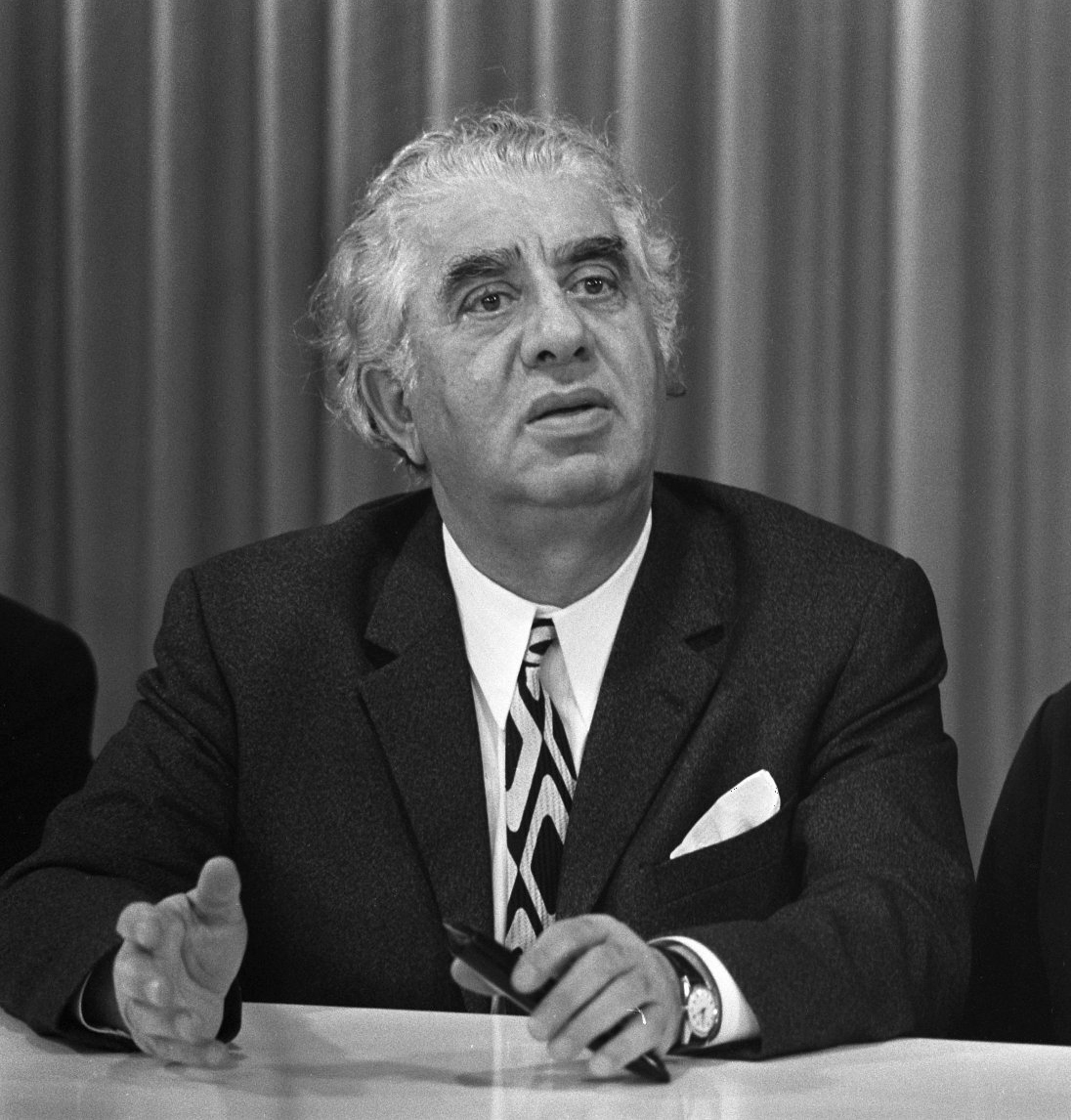
Aram Khachaturian, Soviet Armenian composer and conductor. He is considered one of the leading Soviet composers

- Artemi Ayvazyan (1902–1975)
- Raffi Armenian (born 1942)
- Marc Aryan (1926–1985)
- George Avakian (1919–2017)
- Clint Bajakian
- Ani Batikian (born 1982)
- Sergey Balasanian (1902–1982)
- Sargis Barkhudaryan (1887–1973)
- Julian Byzantine (born 1945)
- Yeghia Dndesian (1834–1881)
- Armen Donelian (born 1950)
- Stéphan Elmas (1862–1937)
- Angelo Ephrikian (1913–1982)
- Nicol Galanderian (1881–1944)
- Georges Garvarentz (1932–1993)
- Djivan Gasparyan (1928–2021)
- Richard Hagopian (born 1937)
- Ruben Hakhverdyan (born 1950)
- Alan Hovhaness (1911–2000)
- Edgar Hovhannisyan (1930–1998)
- Jivani (1846–1909)
- Yuri Kasparov (born 1955)
- Udi Hrant Kenkulian (1901–1978)
- Aram Khachaturian (1903–1978)
- Khosrovidukht
- Komitas (1869–1935)
- Shavo Odadjian (born 1974)
- Kev Orkian (born 1974)
- Bulat Okudzhava (1924–1997)
- Hampartsoum Limondjian (1768–1839)
- Sayat-Nova (1712–1795)
- Anton Mailyan (1880–1942)
- Spiridon Melikyan (1880–1933)
- Edvard Mirzoyan (1921–2012)
- Boris Parsadanian (1925–1997)
- Krzysztof Penderecki (1933–2020)
- Leon Redbone (1949–2019)
- Sahakdukht
- Ghazaros Saryan (1920–1998)
- Ruben Sargsyan (1945–2013)
- Vahram Sargsyan (born 1981)
- Grikor Suni (1876–1939)
- Alexander Spendiaryan (1871–1928)
- Khachatur of Taron
- Harry Tavitian (born 1952)
- Mikael Tariverdiev (1931–1996)
- Anoushavan Ter-Ghevondyan (1887–1961)
- Onno Tunç (1948–1996)
- Armen Tigranian (1879–1950)
- Vartan Vahramian
- Makar Yekmalyan (1856–1905)

==== Conductors ====
- Loris Ohannes Chobanian (1933–2023)
- Alain Altinoglu (born 1975)
- Raffi Armenian (born 1942)
- Tigran Chukhajian (1837–1898)
- Ohan Durian (1922–2011)
- Mihail Jora (1891–1971)
- Aleksandr Melik-Pashayev (1905–1964)
- Peter Oundjian (born 1955)
- Ohannes Tchekidjian (born 1929)
- Loris Tjeknavorian (born 1937)
- Emmanuel Tjeknavorian (born 1995)

==== Folk musicians ====
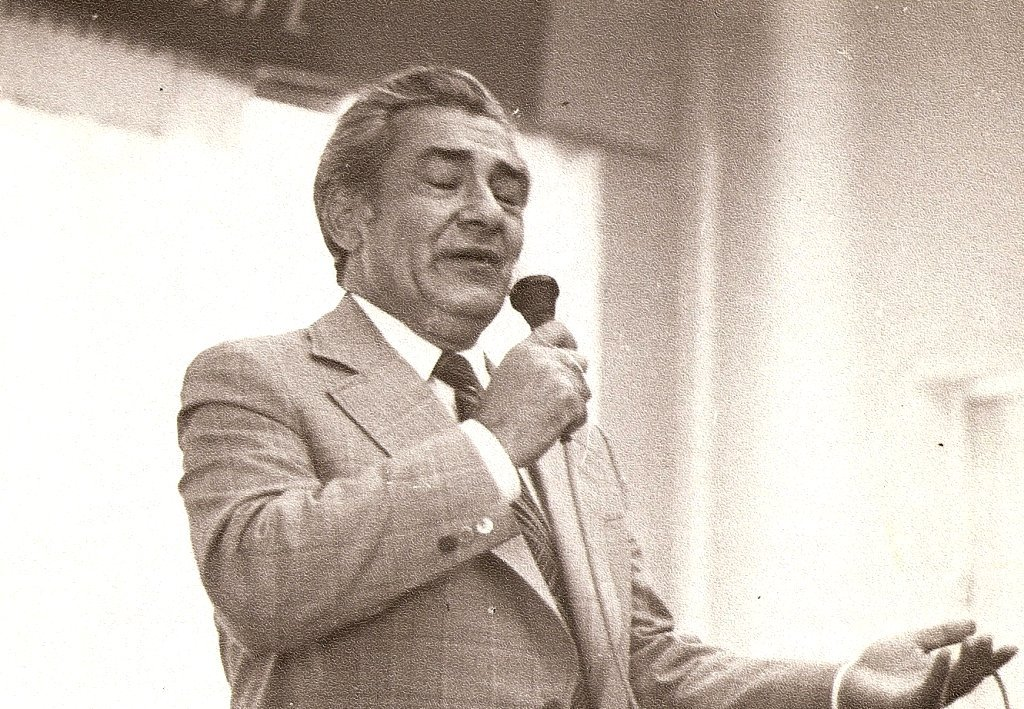
Norayr Mnatsakanyan performing in Luxembourg

- Roupen Altiparmakian (1919–1999)
- Sevak Amroyan (born 1990)
- Gagik Badalyan (born 1980)
- John Berberian (born 1941)
- John Bilezikjian (1948–2015)
- Ara Dinkjian (born 1958)
- Onnik Dinkjian (born 1929)
- Ofelya Hambardzumyan (1925–2016)
- Vache Hovsepyan (1925–1978)
- Udi Hrant Kenkulian (1901–1978)
- Flora Martirosian (1957–2012)
- Norayr Mnatsakanyan (1923–1986)
- Karnig Sarkissian (bron 1953)

==== Opera Singers ====
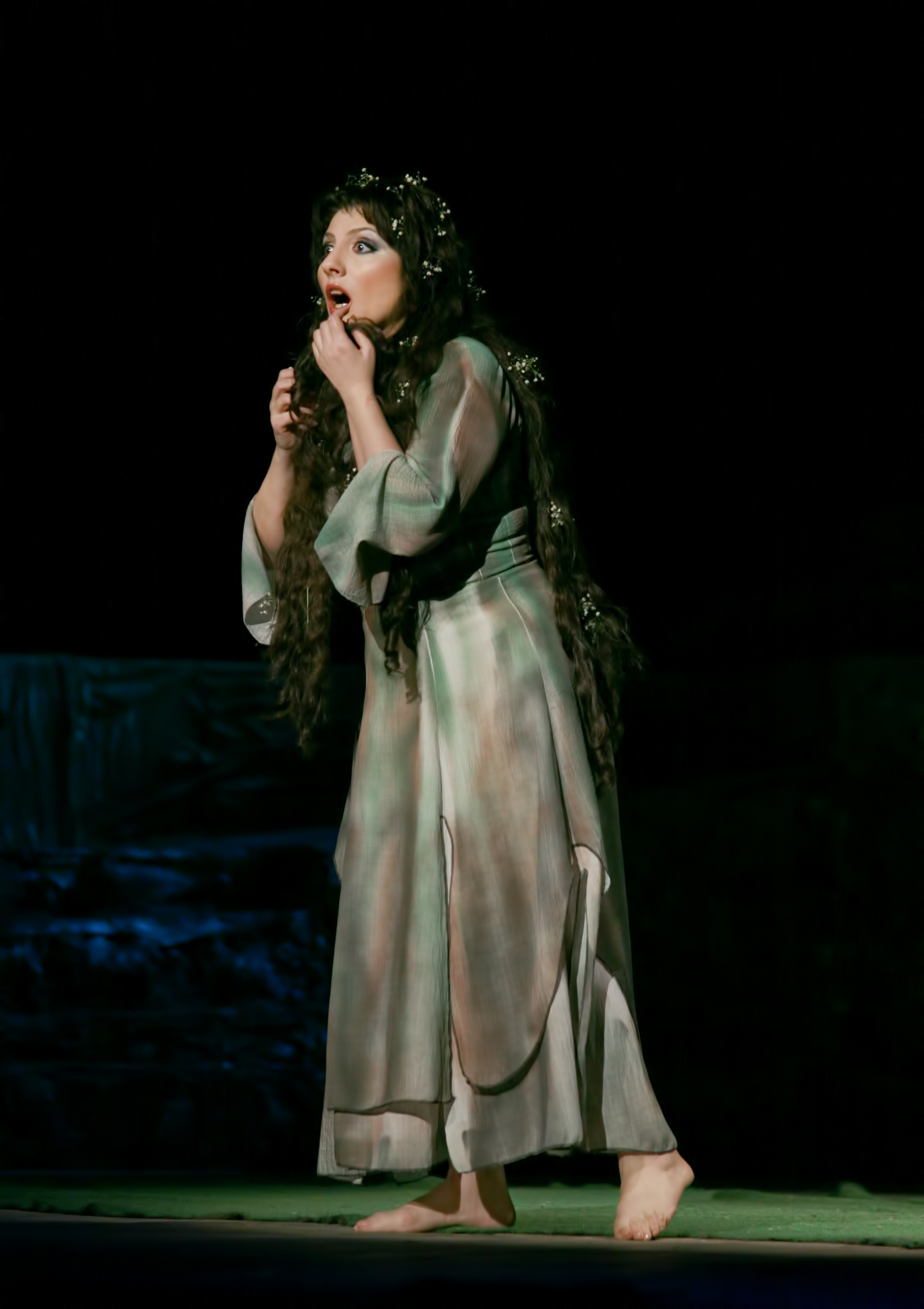
Anahit Mekhitarian as Anoush

- Lucine Amara (1925–2024)
- Isabel Bayrakdarian (born 1974)
- Cathy Berberian (1925–1983)
- Haykanoush Danielyan (1893–1958)
- Gohar Gasparyan (1924–2007)
- Asmik Grigorian (born 1981)
- Gegham Grigoryan (1951–2016)
- Pavel Lisitsian (1911–2004)
- Verkine Karakashian (1856–1933)
- Hasmik Papian (born 1961)
- Arda Mandikian (1924–2009)
- Anahit Mekhitarian (born 1969)
- Tatevik Sazandaryan (1916–1999)

==== Pianists ====
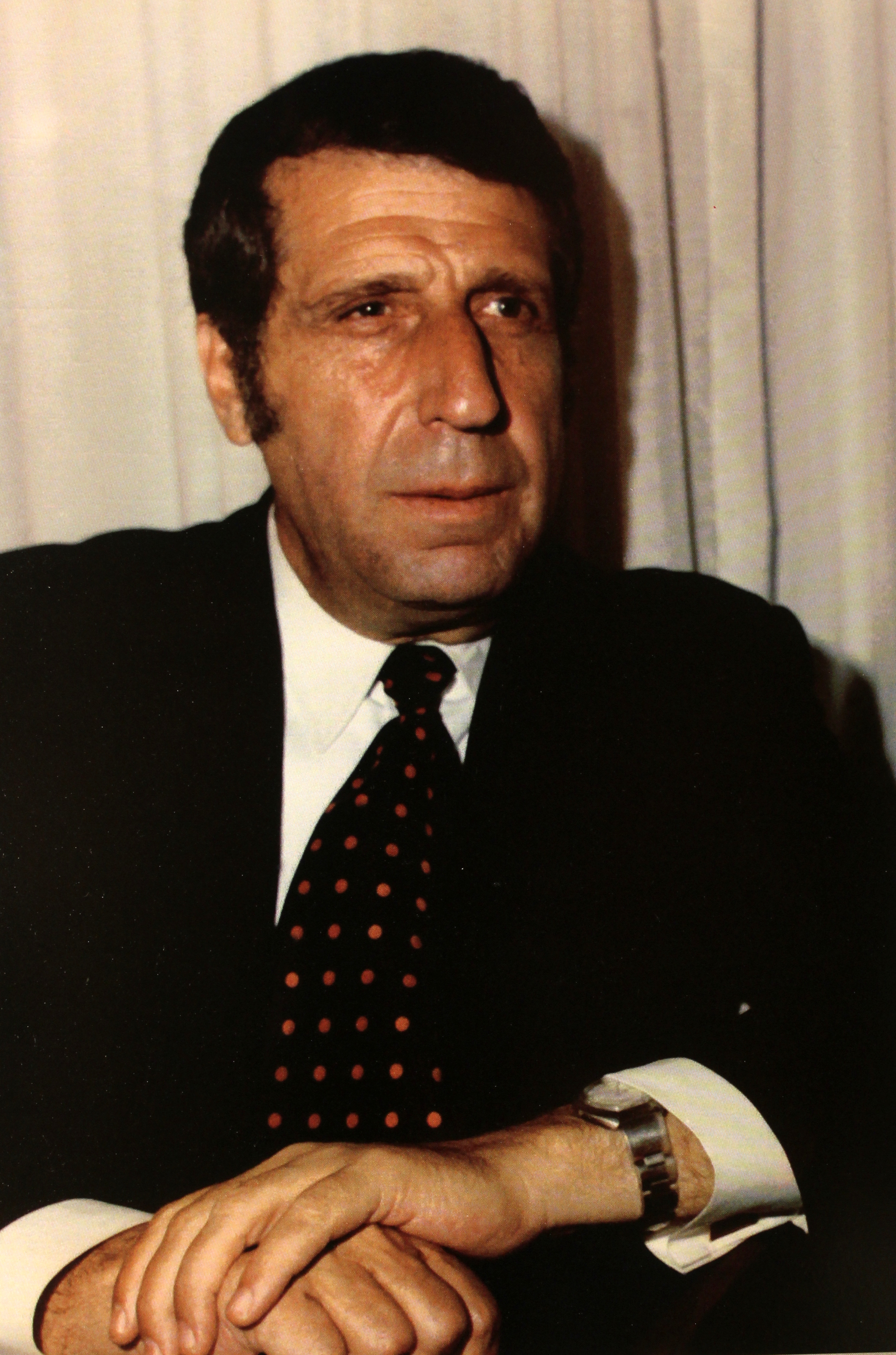
Arno Babajanyan, Soviet composer and pianist. He is widely regarded as one of the greatest composers of the Soviet era

- Maro Ajemian (1921–1978)
- Alexander Arutiunian (1920–2012)
- Nareh Arghamanyan (born 1989)
- Şahan Arzruni (born 1943)
- Armen Babakhanian (born 1967)
- Arno Babajanyan (1921–1983)
- Sergei Babayan (born 1961)
- Raffi Besalyan
- Stéphan Elmas (1862–1937)
- Koharik Gazarossian (1907–1967)
- Eva Gevorgyan (born 2004)
- Nairi Grigorian (born 1968)
- Nune Hairapetian (born 1951)
- Rita Kassabian
- David Khanjyan (1940–1981)
- Serouj Kradjian
- Vardan Mimikonyan
- Zela Margossian (born 1980)
- Sofya Melikyan (born 1978)
- Beatrice Ohanessian (1927–2008)
- Constantine Orbelian (born 1956)
- Karina Pasian (born 1991)
- Konstantin Petrossian (born 1946)
- Heghine Rapyan (born 1985)
- Vardan Sardaryan (born 1962)
- Nariné Simonian
- Anaida Sumbatyan (1905–1985)
- Avo Uvezian (1926–2017)
- Julietta Vardanyan (born 1983)

==== Singers ====
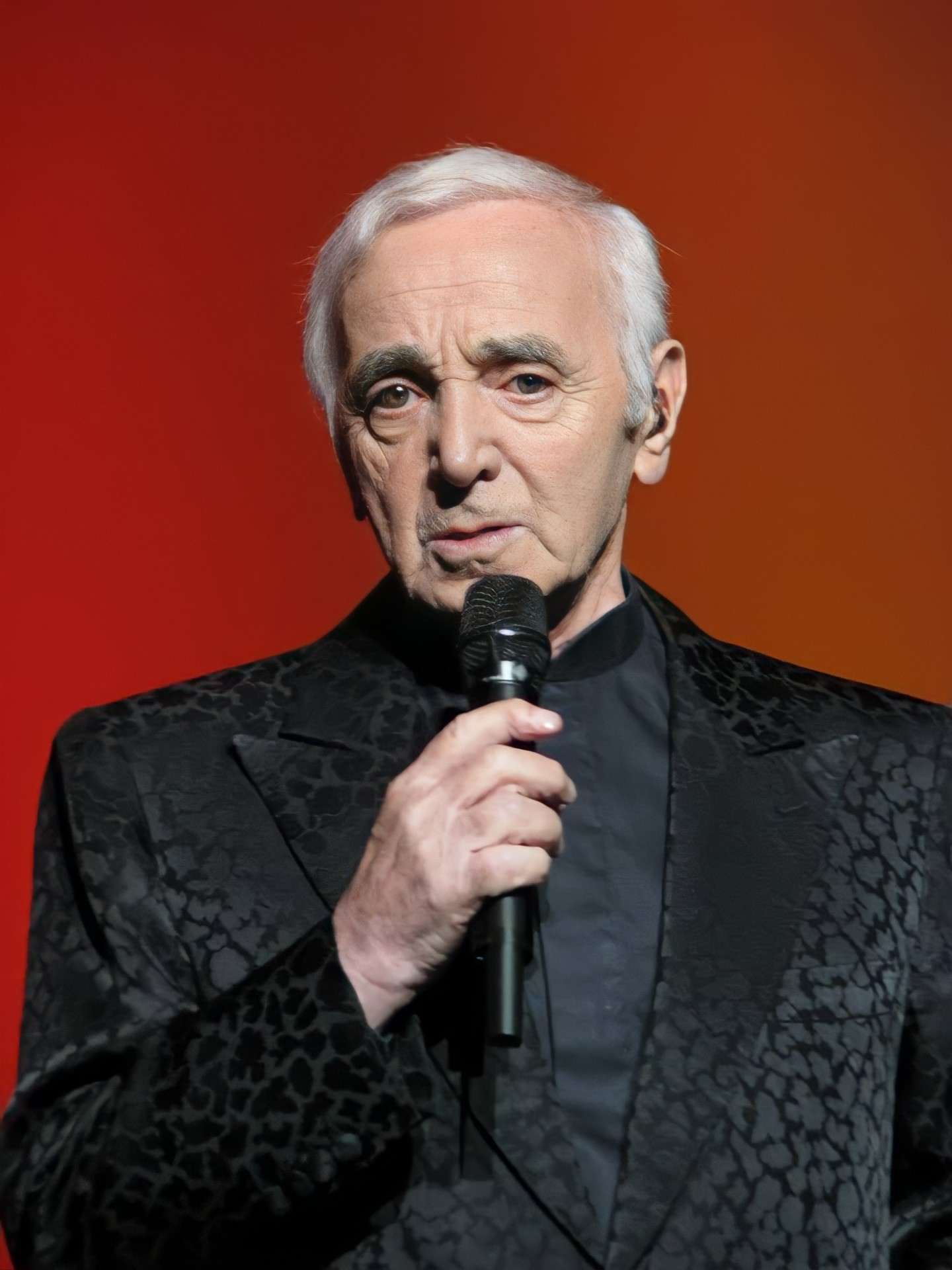
Charles Aznavour, regarded as one of the greatest songwriters of all time and an icon of 20th-century pop culture

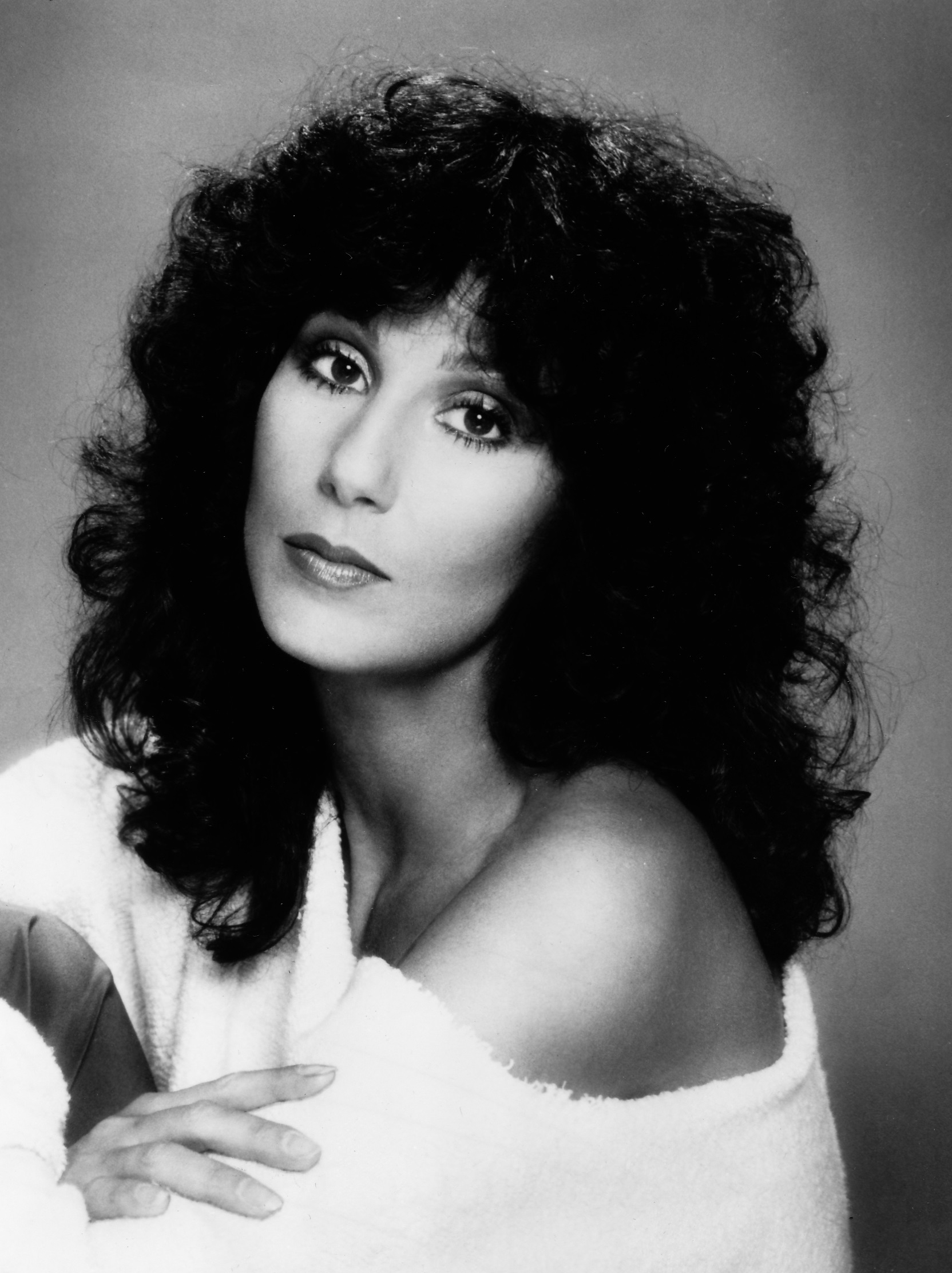
Cher, becoming the female solo artist with the most number-one singles in US history at the time

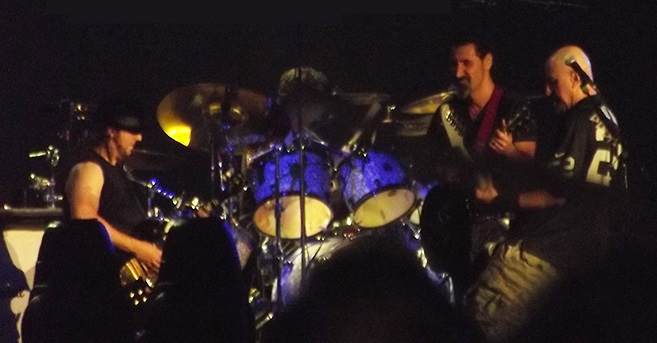
System of a Down known to be one of the most influential metal bands of the 21st century

- Anahit Adamyan (born 2003)
- Irina Allegrova (born 1952)
- André (born 1979)
- Anoushka (born 1960)
- Rosy Armen (born 1939)
- Albert Armenakyan (born 2013)
- Armenchik (born 1980)
- Artsvik (born 1984)
- Marc Aryan (1926–1985)
- Vladimir Arzumanyan (born 1998)
- Aram Asatryan (1953–2006)
- Dalita Avanesian (born 1999)
- Charles Aznavour (1924–2018)
- Arev Baghdasaryan (1913–1994)
- Ross Bagdasarian, Sr. (1919–1972)
- bbno$ (born 1995)
- Betty (born 2003)
- Boka (1949–2020)
- Brunette (born 2001)
- Cher (born 1946)
- Hovig Demirjian (born 1989)
- John Dolmayan (born 1972)
- Emmy (born 1984)
- Sergio Galoyan (born 1981)
- Silva Hakobyan (born 1988)
- Sirusho Harutyunyan (born 1987)
- Luara Hayrapetyan (born 1997)
- Hayko (1973–2021)
- Karina Ignatyan (born 2006)
- Jamala (born 1983)
- Hasmik Karapetyan (born 1977)
- Verkine Karakashian (1856–1933)
- Sevak Khanagyan (born 1987)
- Tamara Khanum (1906–1991)
- Bob Kevoian (born 1950)
- Philipp Kirkorov (born 1967)
- Konfuz (born 2003)
- Rosa Linn (born 2000)
- Andranik Madadian (born 1958)
- Daron Malakian (born 1975)
- Maléna (born 2007)
- Athena Manoukian (born 1994)
- Arsen Mirzoyan (born 1978)
- Norayr Mnatsakanyan (1923–1986)
- Aram Mp3 (born 1984)
- Iveta Mukuchyan (born 1986)
- Maria Nalbandian (born 1985)
- Bruce Nazarian (1949–2015)
- Harout Pamboukjian (born 1950)
- Parg (born 1996)
- Karina Pasian (born 1991)
- Christine Pepelyan (born 1980)
- Lilit Pipoyan (born 1955)
- Peruz
- Raffi (born 1948)
- Eva Rivas (born 1987)
- Hélène Ségara (born 1971)
- Simón (born 1995)
- Sirusho (born 1987)
- Tata Simonyan (born 1962)
- Srbuk (born 1994)
- Stephanie (born 1987)
- Serj Tankian (born 1967)
- Aram Tigran (1934–2009)
- Arto Tunçboyacıyan (born 1957)
- George Tutunjian (1930–2006)
- Michael Varosyan (born 2003)
- Sylvie Vartan (born 1944)
- Karapetê Xaço (1900–2005)
- Nune Yesayan (born 1969)
- Lusine Zakaryan (1937–1992)

==== Violinists ====
- Anahid Ajemian (1924–2016)
- Levon Ambartsumian (born 1955)
- Armen Anassian (born 1963)
- Ani Batikian (born 1982)
- Ivan Galamian (1903–1981)
- Ani Kavafian (born 1948)
- Ida Kavafian (born 1952)
- Sergey Khachatryan (born 1985)
- Armen Movsessian (born 1969)
- Gerard Jirayr Svazlian (born 1946)
- Jean Ter-Merguerian (1935–2015)
- Emmanuel Tjeknavorian (born 1995)
- Samvel Yervinyan (born 1966)

==== Other Musicians ====
- DJ Alber Ensso (born 1999), DJ and music producer
- Slava Grigoryan (born 1976)
- Narek Hakhnazaryan (born 1988)
- Levon Ichkhanian (born 1964)
- Kim Kashkashian (born 1952)
- Berj Zamkochian (1929–2004)

=== Photographers ===
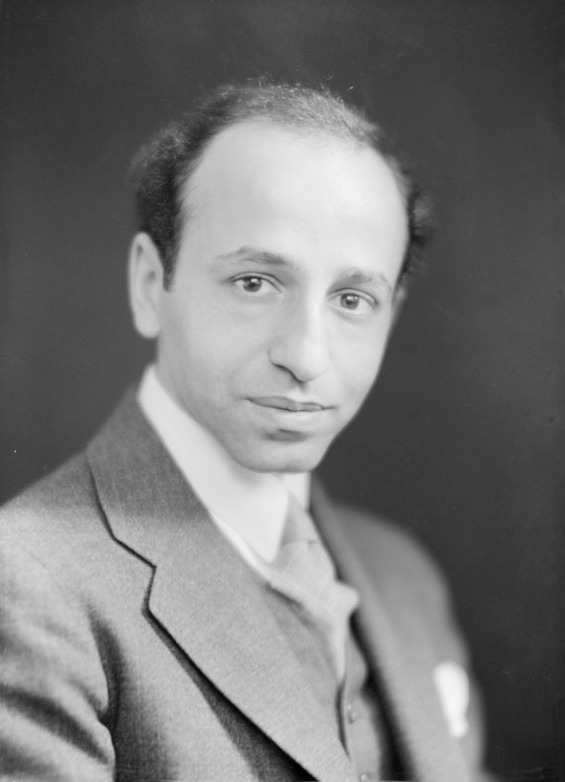
Yousuf Karsh, known for his portraits of notable individuals. He has been described as one of the greatest portrait photographers of the 20th century

- Kegham Djeghalian, an Armenian-Palestinian photographer, known for his photographs documenting daily life and political events over four decades
- Abdullah Frères, photographers of international fame during the late Ottoman Empire
- Anita Conti (1899–1997), French photographer, and the first French female oceanographer
- Jean Pascal Sébah (1872–1947), was a Syriac photographer
- Samvel Sevada (born 1949), an Armenian artist, photographer and poet
- Yousuf Karsh (1908–2002), Canadian photograph, famous for his The Roaring Lion portriet
- Van Leo (1921–2002), Egyptian photographer who became known for his numerous self-portraits and portraits of celebrities of his time

=== Printers ===
- Apkar Tebir, establisher of an early printing press in Constantinople.
- Hovsep Arghutian, bishop, religious leader, and co-founder of the first Armenian printing press in Russia.
- Alexander Atabekian, physician, writer, and establisher of an anarchist printing press in Geneva.
- Hakob Meghapart, printer of Urbatagirk, the first book printed in Armenian.
- Khachatur Kesaratsi, founder of the first printing press in Iran.
- Paghtasar Dpir, poet, musician, scholar, and printer.
- Shahamir Shahamirian, founder of the first Armenian printing press in Madras.
- Harutyun Shmavonian, priest of the Armenian Apostolic Church noted as the founder of Armenian journalism through his publishing of the first Armenian newspaper, Azdarar.
- Simeon I of Yerevan, Catholicos of All Armenians and founder of the first printing press in Armenia, which was located in Etchmiadzin.
- Voskan Yerevantsi, printer of the first Armenian Bible.

=== Writers ===
==== Medieval ====
- Moses of Chorene, father of Armenian historiography
- Komitas Aghtsetsi
- Davtak Kertogh
- Khosrov of Andzev
- Basil the Doctor
- Frik
- Khachatur of Taron
- Terter Yerevantsi
- Nahapet Kuchak
- Szymon Szymonowic
- Gomidas Keumurdjian
- Martiros of Crimea
- Naghash Hovnatan
- Łewond

==== Modern ====
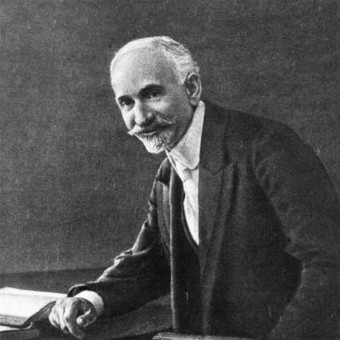
Hovhannes Tumanyan, national poet of Armenia

- Narine Abgaryan (born 1971), writer, novelist, blogger
- Khachatur Abovian (1805–1842), writer, activist and academic
- Nicholas Adontz (1871–1942), historian and philologist
- Vittoria Aganoor (1855–1910), poet
- Ghazaros Aghayan (1840–1911), writer, educator, folklorist, historian, linguist and public figure
- Ara Aloyan (born 1981), poet, writer and pedagogue
- Michael Arlen (1895–1956), novelist
- Artine Artinian (1907–2005), literature scholar
- Gheorghe Asachi (1788–1869), writer, poet, historian, painter
- Louise Aslanian (1906–1945), writer, poet, French Resistance fighter, Communist
- Atrpet (1860–1937), writer
- Axel Bakunts (1889–1937), activist
- Peter Balakian (born 1951), memoirist and Pulitzer Prize-winning poet
- Ara Baliozian (1936–2019), writer
- David Barsamian, writer, radio host
- A. I. Bezzerides (1908–2007), screenwriter and novelist
- Chris Bohjalian (born 1962), novelist
- Gary Braver (born 1942), writer
- Michael Casey (born 1947), poet
- Vasile Conta (1845–1882), Romanian philosopher and poet
- James Der Derian, international relations researcher and author
- Diana Der Hovanessian (1934–2018), poet
- Gabriel El-Registan (1899–1945), poet, co-author of the anthem of the USSR
- Gevorg Emin (1918–1998), poet, essayist, and translator
- Arto Der Haroutunian (1940–1987), cook, writer and artist
- Artem Harutyunyan (born 1945), writer, translator, critic
- Zbigniew Herbert (1924–1998), Polish poet
- Marjorie Housepian Dobkin, novelist and writer on the Armenian genocide
- Garabet Ibrăileanu (1871–1936), writer, literary critic, professor
- Avetik Isahakyan (1885–1957), poet
- Tadeusz Isakowicz-Zaleski (1956–2024), Polish Armenian-Catholic priest and author
- Silva Kaputikyan (1919–2006), poet
- Martiros Kavoukjian (1908–1988), Armenologist
- Nancy Kricorian (born 1960), writer, activist
- Jan Lechoń (1899–1956), (Leszek Józef Serafinowicz), Polish poet
- Gurgen Mahari (1903–1969), writer and poet
- M. M. Mangasarian (1859–1943), atheist writer
- Zara Mgoyan (born 1983), writer, singer
- Bethany Mooradian (born 1975), writer
- Tom Mooradian (1928–2024), journalist and author
- Alexander Movsesyan (1858–1935), playwright and novelist
- Claude Mutafian (born 1942), historian and mathematician
- Mikayel Nalbandian (1829–1866), author of the anthem of the First Republic of Armenia
- Santiago Nazarian (born 1977), novelist
- Hrand Nazariantz (1886–1962), poet and journalist
- Sev Ohanian (born 1987), screenwriter
- Joseph Orbeli (1887–1961), Orientalist
- George Ouzounian (known as "Maddox") (born 1978), author, satirist and webmaster
- Vartan Pasha, Ottoman Armenian statesman, writer and journalist
- Marine Petrossian (born 1960), Armenian poet, essayist and columnist
- Raffi (Hagop Hagopian) (1835–1888), novelist and poet
- Rousas Rushdoony (1916–2001), Calvinistic philosopher and Christian Reconstructionist
- Aram Saroyan (born 1943), poet, novelist
- William Saroyan (1908–1981), short story writer, novelist, playwright, essayist and memoirist
- Sayat-Nova (1712–1795), philosopher and poet
- Paruyr Sevak (1924–1971), poet
- Marietta Shaginyan (1888–1982), writer, poet and journalist
- Smbat Shahaziz (1840–1908), poet
- Levon Shant (1869–1951), playwright, novelist
- Hovhannes Shiraz (1915–1984), poet
- Siamanto (1878–1915), poet and martyr
- Juliusz Słowacki (1809–1849), Polish poet
- George Stambolian (1937–1991), key figure in the early gay literary movement in New York
- Szymon Szymonowic (1558–1629), Polish Renaissance poet
- Serj Tankian (born 1967), singer, songwriter
- Vahan Tekeyan (1878–1948), poet
- Tovmas Terzian (1840–1909), poet, playwright, and professor
- Vahan Terian (1885–1920), poet
- Henri Troyat (born Levon Aslan Torossian) (1911–2007), writer
- Hovhannes Tumanyan (1869–1923), writer and public activist
- Varand (born 1954), poet, writer, translator, painter, professor
- Alexander Varbedian (born 1943), Armenologist and ethnologist
- Francis Veber (born 1937), screenwriter
- Thomas Woods (born 1972), author and scholar
- Zabel Yesayan (1878–1943), author and human rights activist
- Perch Zeytuntsyan (1938–2017), novelist, playwright, screenwriter, and Minister of Culture of Armenia 1990–1991

== Scholars and scientists ==
=== Medieval ===
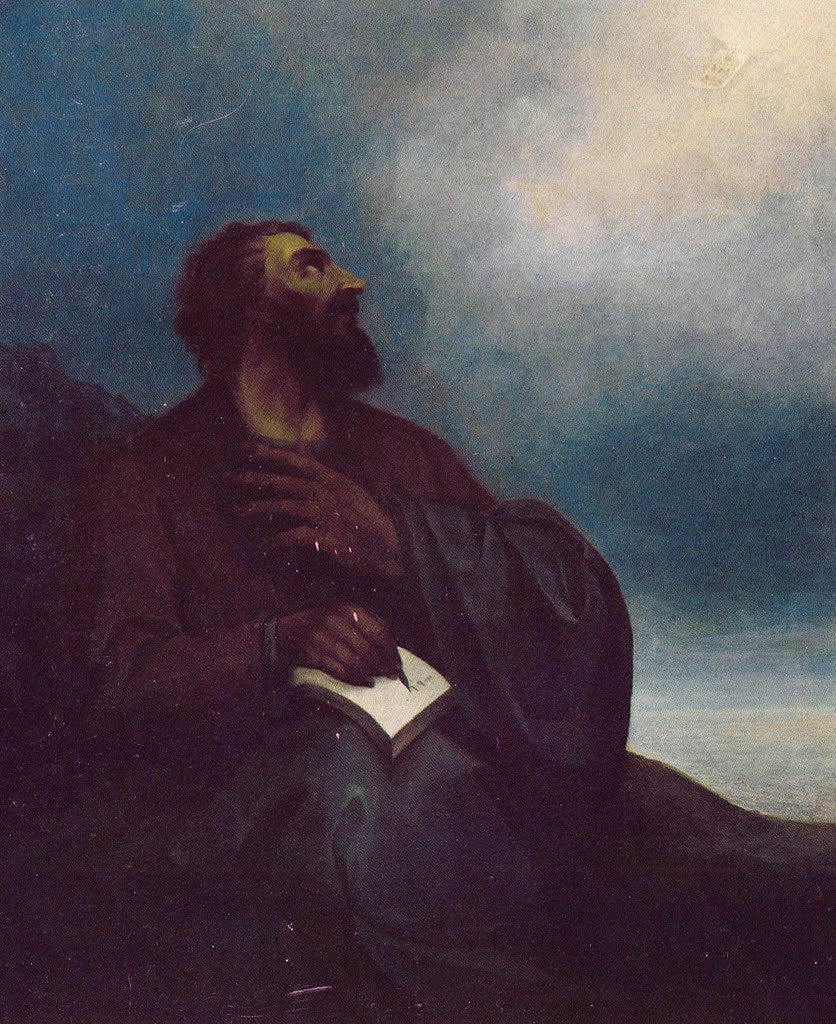
Mesrop Mashtots, founder of moderen Armenian alphabet, Albanian alphabet

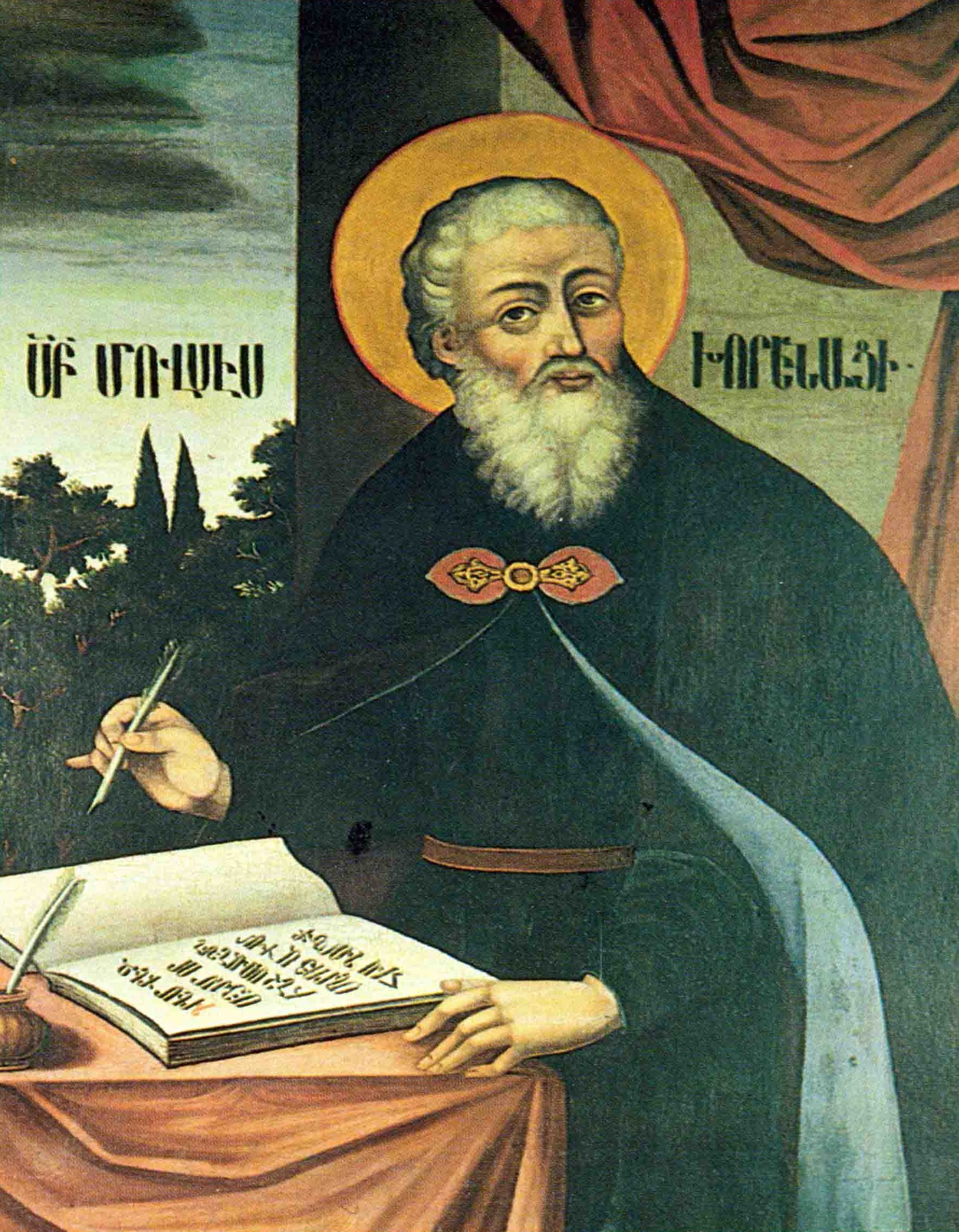
Movses Khorenatsi, called the "father of Armenian history", and is sometimes referred to as the "Armenian Herodotus"

- Prohaeresius (3rd–4th century), Christian teacher, one of the leading sophists of the era along with Diophantus the Arab and Epiphanius of Syria
- Mesrop Mashtots (362–440), Armenian linguist, composer, theologian, statesman, and hymnologist in the Sasanian Empire. He is venerated as a saint in the Armenian Apostolic, Catholic, and Eastern Orthodox Churches
- Koriun, earliest Armenian-language author, his Life of Mashtots contains many details about the evangelization of Armenia and the invention of the Armenian alphabet by Mesrop Mashtots
- Elishe (410–475), historian, best known as the author of History of Vardan and the Armenian War
- Agathangelos (5th century), pseudonym of the author of a life of the first apostle of Armenia, Gregory the Illuminator
- Faustus of Byzantium (5th century), historian, describes in detail the reigns of Arshak II and his son Papas Pap, and portrays the Mamikonians
- Zenob Glak (5th century), historian who became the first abbot of the Glak monastery
- Ghazar Parpetsi (5th–6th centuries), Armenian chronicler and historian
- Hovnan Mayravanetsi, was an Armenian theologian and philosopher
- Movses Khorenatsi, was a prominent historian from late antiquity and the author of the History of the Armenians
- Sebeos (7th century), bishop and historian
- Movses Kagankatvatsi (7th century), historian, author of the book History of the World from Aghvan
- John Mamikonean (7th century), historian and author of the History of Taron
- Anania Shirakatsi, polymath and natural philosopher, author of extant works covering mathematics, astronomy, geography, chronology, and other fields
- Leo the Mathematician, Byzantine philosopher and logician associated with the Macedonian Renaissance
- Anania Narekatsi, chronicler, theologian, philosopher, commentator, leader of Narekavank and founder of the school
- Tovma Artsruni (9th–10th centuries), historian, authored the History of the House of Artsrunik
- Joseph Genesius (10th century), Byzantine author and chronicler
- Stepanos Asoghik (10–11th centuries), was an historian
- Hovhannes Imastaser (1045–1129), medieval multi-disciplinary scholar known for his works on philosophy, theology, mathematics, cosmology, and literature
- Samuel Anetsi (12th century), known for his writing of history and chronicles a book where he is the first author to use the Armenian Chronology
- Mkhitar Heratsi (12th-century), considered the father of Armenian medicine
- Matthew of Edessa (12th century), historian in the 12th century from the city of Edessa
- Hovhannes Erznkatsi (1230s–1293), scholar and philosopher
- Gregory of Akner (13th century), historian, famous for his important source for the Mongol conquest of the Near East
- Vardan Areveltsi (13th century), historian, geographer, philosopher and translator
- Hayton of Corycus (14th century), medieval nobleman, monk and historiographer

=== Early Modern ===
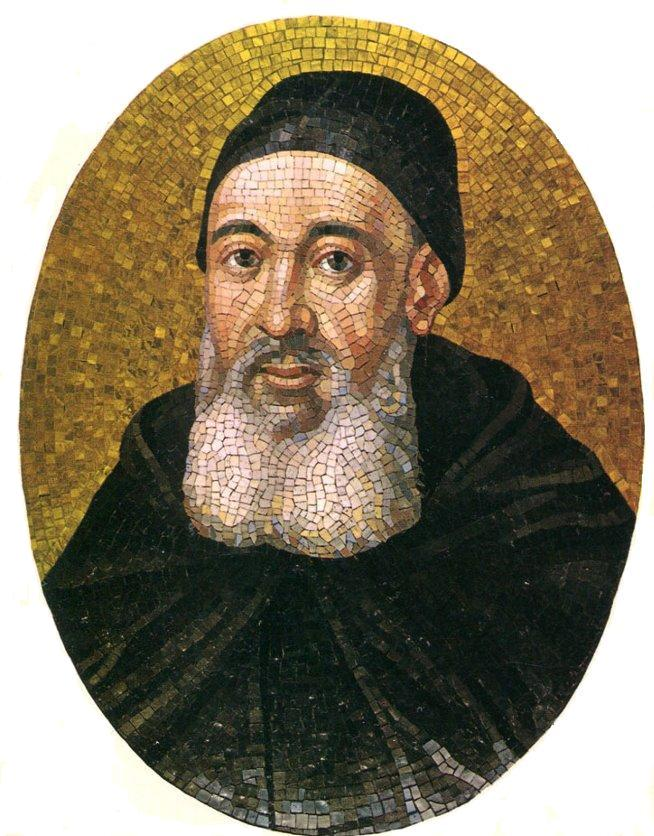
Mkhitar Sebastatsi mosaic

- Gregory of Tatev (1346–1409 or 1410), philosopher, theologian and a saint in the Armenian Apostolic Church
- Thomas of Metsoph (1378–1446), cleric and chronicler who left an account of Timur's invasions of the Caucasus
- Amirdovlat of Amasia (1420–1496), physician and writer, wrote several works on medicine and science
- Hakob Meghapart (16th century), first Armenian printer, the originator of printing in Armenia
- Giorgio Baglivi (1668–1701), Croatian-Italian physician and scientist
- Esayi Hasan-Jalalyan (1677–1728), historian and catholicos of Aghvank
- Mkhitar Sebastatsi (1676–1749), monk, scholar and theologian who founded the Mekhitarist Order
- Mikayel Chamchian (1738–1823), was an Armenian Mekhitarist monk, historian, grammarian and theologian
- Grzegorz Piramowicz (1753–1801), Catholic priest, educator and philosopher
- Shahamir Shahamirian (1723–1797), writer, philosopher, and wealthy merchant in Madras
- Joseph Emin (1726–1809), traveler, writer and patriot who sought to achieve the liberation of Armenia from Persian and Ottoman rule
- Gheorghe Asachi (1788–1869), Romanian prose writer, poet, painter, historian, dramatist, engineer, border maker, and translator
- Ioan Mire Melik (1840–1889), Romanian mathematician, educator and political figure

=== Modern ===
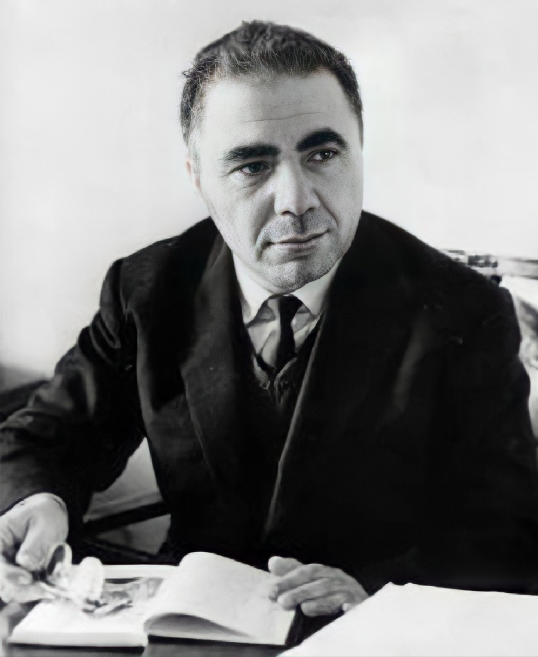
Viktor Ambartsumyan, Soviet Armenian astrophysicist, he was the president of the IAU (1961–1963)

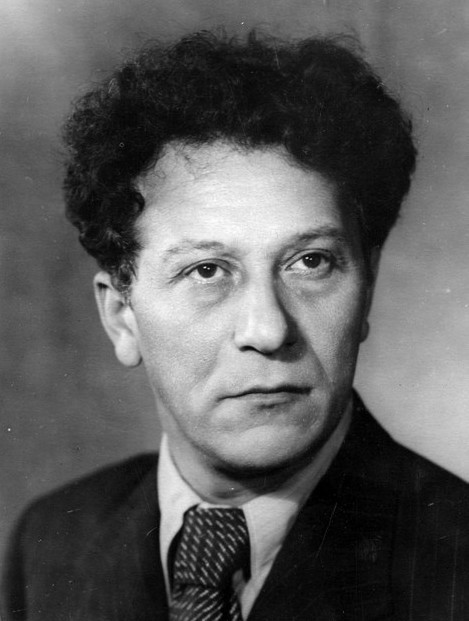
Abraham Alikhanov, experimental physicist, was one of the Soviet Union's leading physicists

==== Archaeology ====
- Włodzimierz Antoniewicz, rector of the University of Warsaw; member of the PAN.
- Joseph Hekekyan (1807–1875), archaeologist and civil engineer, who lived most of his life in Egypt.
- Ashkharbek Kalantar (1884–1942), archaeologist and historian who played an important role in the founding of archaeology in Armenia.
- Martiros Kavoukjian (1908–1988), architect; researcher; Armenologis; and historian-archaeologist.
- Hagop Kevorkian (1872–1962), archeologist and art collector.
- Yervand Lalayan (1864–1931), ethnographer; archaeologist; folklorist; and the founder and first director of the History Museum of Armenia.
- Ruben Orbeli (1880–1943), Soviet archeologist; historia; and jurist who was renowned as the founder of Soviet underwater archeology.

==== Astronomy ====
- Tateos Agekian, astrophysicist; one of the pioneers of Stellar Dynamics.
- Viktor Ambartsumian, astrophysicist; one of the founders of theoretical astrophysics.
- James P. Bagian, physician; engineer; and former NASA astronaut.
- Tabetha S. Boyajian, astronomer; discoverer of Tabby's star.
- Grigor Gurzadyan, founder of space astronomy.
- Spiru Haret, astronomer; made a fundamental contribution to the n-body problem; initially aimed at modelling the planetary motions in our solar system.
- Benjamin Markarian, astrophysicist; known for the Markarian galaxies.
- Paris Pişmiş, astronomer; one of the pioneers of Mexican astronomy.
- Alenush Terian, first Iranian-Armenian female astrophysicist.

==== Biology ====
- Sos Alikhanian, geneticist; one of the founders of molecular genetics in the USSR; founder of the State Research Institute of Genetics (GosNIIgenetika).
- Vandika Ervandovna Avetisyan, botanist and mycologist.
- Levon Chailakhyan, physiologist and cloning pioneer.
- Mikhail Chailakhyan, founder of hormonal theory of plant development.
- Emmanuele Charpentier, microbiologist; biochemist; co-developer of CRISPR; awarded the Nobel Prize for Chemistry in 2020.
- Ardem Patapoutian, neuroscientist; discovered the PIEZO1, PEIZO2, and TRPM8 receptors; awarded Nobel Prize for Medicine in 2021.
- Anna Schchian, botanist.
- Norair Sisakian, biochemist; one of the founders of space biology.
- Armen Takhtajan, botanist; one of the most important figures in 20th century plant evolution and systematics and biogeography.
- Margarita Ervandovna Ter-Minassian, entomologist mostly known for her work on the weevil subfamily Lixinae.

==== Chemistry ====
- Giacomo Luigi Ciamician, founder of photochemistry.
- Vram Dovlatyan, Soviet organic chemist.
- Ivan Knunyants, chemist; significantly contributed to the advancement of Soviet chemistry; one of the major developers of Soviet chemical weapons program.
- Nerses Krikorian, chemist and intelligence officer at Los Alamos National Laboratory.
- Robert Nalbandyan, chemist; co-discoverer of photosynthetic protein plantacyanin; pioneer in the field of free radicals.
- Yuri Oganessian, nuclear physicist in the Joint Institute for Nuclear Research (JINR); co-discoverer of the heaviest elements in the periodic table, element Oganesson.
- Nikolay Yenikolopov, chemist; one of the founders of Russian polymer science.

==== Computer Science ====
- Boris Babayan, computer scientist; father of supercomputing in the former Soviet Union and Russia; founder of Moscow Center of SPARC Technologies (MCST).
- Leonid Khachiyan, mathematician; computer scientist; proved the existence of an efficient way to solve linear programming problems.
- Tigran Khudaverdyan, computer scientist; deputy CEO of Yandex.
- Ashot Petrosian, mathematician; computer scientist; contributed to the development of several generations of advanced digital computer systems in former USSR, including the Nairi (computer) and ES EVM.
- Avie Tevanian, computer scientist and programmer; architect of Apple's Mac OS X.

==== Economics ====
- Daron Acemoglu (b. 1967), among the 20 most cited economists in the world; awarded the 2005 John Bates Clark Medal; awarded the Nobel Prize for Economics in 2024.
- Armen Alchian, economist; one of the major economists of the 20th century.
- Richard Donchian, father of Trend Following Trading; one of the most outstanding figures of all time in the field of commodity money management.
- Arman Manukyan (1931–2012), Turkish lecturer; writer; and economist.
- Lee Ohanian (b. 1957), macroeconomist.

==== Engineering ====
- Hovannes Adamian, engineer; inventor of color television.
- Bagrat Ioannisiani, constructor of new astronomical instruments; chief designer of BTA-6, the largest telescope in the world.
- Andronik Iosifyan, aerospace engineer; chief electrician of Soviet missiles and spacecraft, including the R-7 Semyorka and the Soyuz spacecraft.
- Alexander Kemurdzhian, aerospace engineer; designer of the first space exploration rovers for moon and mars.
- Edward Keonjian, pioneer of microelectronics; designer of the world's first solar-powered, pocket-sized radio transmitter.
- Anna Kazanjian Longobardo, author of contributions to the aerospace engineering field; the first woman to receive the Egleston Medal for Distinguished Engineering achievement.
- Ignacy Łukasiewicz, pharmacist; one of the world's pioneers of the oil industry; built the world's first modern oil refinery.
- Hal Markarian, American aircraft designer; Northrop B-2 Spirit stealth bomber.
- Natalia Martirosyan, irrigation engineer.
- Artem Mikoyan, aerospace engineer, designer of MiG jet aircraft, including the first supersonic Soviet jet fighter.
- Mikhail Pogosyan, aerospace engineer; general director of Sukhoi and United Aircraft Corporation (UAC).
- George Ter-Stepanian, one of the founders of the landslide studies in Soviet Union.

==== History ====
- Nicholas Adontz, historian specialising in Byzantine and Armenian studies; philologist.
- Gabriel Aivazovsky, an Armenian Catholic archbishop; scholar; educator; and historian.
- Ghevont Alishan, Armenian Catholic priest; historian; educator; and poet.
- Grigor Ghapantsyan, historian; orientalist; linguist; and philologist that pioneered the study of Urartu and ancient Armenia.
- Leo (1860–1932), an Armenian historian; writer; critic; and professor at Yerevan State University.
- Hakob Manandyan, historian and philologist.
- Stepanos Nazarian (1812–1879), publisher; enlightener; historian of literature; and orientalist.
- Joseph Orbeli, orientalist; public figure and academician who specialized in medieval history of Transcaucasia; and first president of the Armenian National Academy of Sciences.

==== Inventors ====
- Sarkis Acopian, designer of the first ever solar radio.
- Hovannes Adamian, engineer, one of the founders of color television.
- Armen Alchian, credited with turning its economics department into one of the country's best.
- Oscar H. Banker, inventor of automatic transmission for automobiles and the primary controls of the first Sikorsky helicopter.
- Frank Chirkinian, author of the rules for the production of modern golf broadcasting.
- Raymond Damadian, inventor of the first nuclear magnetic resonance (NMR) scanning machine.
- Cyrill Demian, inventor of Accordion.
- Garabed T. K. Giragossian, remembered for developing a perpetual motion device shortly after the turn of the 20th century.
- Semyon Kirlian, teacher and journalist; discovered and developed Kirlian photography.
- Nikita Lazarev, civil engineer; contractor; real estate developer; and Neoclassical architect.
- Cyrus Melikian, coffee industry pioneer; inventor of coffee vending machines.
- Artem Mikoyan, aircraft designer; designed MiG jet aircraft.
- Luther George Simjian, inventor of ATM and flight simulator.
- Stephen Stepanian, called the "father of the ready-mix concrete industry."
- Avedis Zildjian, first cymbals were created by him.

==== Linguistics ====
- Hrachia Acharian, recognized as the father of Armenian linguistics by modern scholars and has been called greatest Armenian linguist.
- Manuk Abeghyan, philologist; literary scholar; folklorist; lexicographer; and linguist.
- Agop Dilâçar, specialist of the Turkish Language Association.
- Grigor Ghapantsyan, historian; orientalist; linguist; and philologist that pioneered the study of Urartu and ancient Armenia.
- Stepan Malkhasyants, academician; philologist; linguist; and lexicographer.
- Hripsime Srapyan, Armenian linguist of the Italian language.

==== Mathematics ====
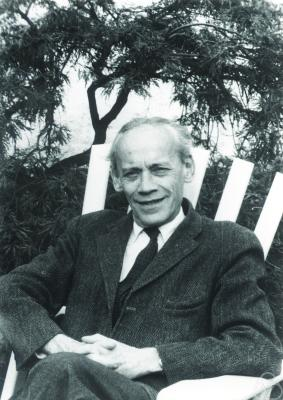
Austrian-Armenian mathematician Emil Artin is considered a co-founder of modern abstract algebra

- Sergei Adian, mathematician; head of the department of Mathematical Logic of the Steklov Institute of Mathematics.
- George Adomian, mathematician; developer of Adomian decomposition method.
- Emil Artin, mathematician; one of the founders of modern algebra.
- Michael Artin, mathematician who contributed to algebraic geometry.
- Leonid Khachiyan, mathematician; computer scientist; proved the existence of an efficient way to solve linear programming problems.
- Sergey Mergelyan, mathematician; author of major contributions in Approximation Theory; head of the department of Complex Analysis of the Steklov Institute of Mathematics.
- Ashot Petrosian, mathematician; computer scientist; contributed to the development of several generations of advanced digital computer systems in former USSR, including the Nairi (computer) and ES EVM.

==== Medicine ====
- Eugen Aburel, Romanian surgeon and obstetrician.
- Noubar Afeyan, biochemical engineer; co-founder of the biotechnology company Moderna.
- George Aghajanian, physician; neuropharmacologist and pioneer in serotonin receptor research.
- Hagop S. Akiskal, psychiatrist best known for his pioneering research on temperament and bipolar disorder (manic depression).
- Roger Altounyan, asthma researcher; pharmacologist who pioneered use of cromolyn sodium inhalation therapy for asthma.
- A. V. Apkarian, pioneer in magnetic resonance spectroscopy research of the brain.
- Viken Babikian, cardiovascular researcher.
- John Basmajian, leader in Rehabilitation Medicine, father of "EMG Biofeedback;" author of pioneering works in electromyography.
- Aram Chobanian, Dean of Boston University School of Medicine and leader in cardiology research.
- Raymond Damadian, physician; inventor of magnetic resonance imaging (MRI); inducted into the National Inventors Hall of Fame.
- Ara Darzi, Baron Darzi of Denham, surgeon, pioneer in minimally invasive and robot-assisted surgery.
- Ivan Gevorkian, surgeon and scientist.
- Edgar Housepian, neurosurgeon and professor.
- Moses M. Housepian, physician and relief worker.
- Robert Istepanian, Professor of Data Communication; coined the phrase "m-health."
- Albert Kapikian, virologist and pioneer in vaccine development for rotavirus.
- Mihran Kassabian, physician, one of the early investigators into the medical uses of X-rays.
- Varaztad Kazanjian, pioneer of plastic surgery.
- J. W. Kebabian, neuroscientist and pioneer in dopamine receptor research.
- Hampar Kelikian, orthopedic-surgeon pioneer; a pioneer in the restoration of damaged limbs.
- Jack Kevorkian, pathologist; euthanasia activist.
- Edward Khantzian, Harvard psychiatrist; developed self-medication hypothesis of substance abuse.
- John Najarian, developed the practice of organ transplantation.
- Leon Orbeli (1882–1958), physiologist; pioneer of evolutionary physiology.
- Ardem Patapoutian, molecular biologist and neuroscientist; won the Nobel Prize for Medicine in 2021.
- Michel Ter-Pogossian, inventor of positron emission tomography (PET).

==== Physics ====
- Evgeny Abramyan, physicist, founder of several research directions in the Soviet and Russian nuclear technology
- Artem Alikhanian, nuclear physicist, one of the founders and first director of the Yerevan Physics Institute (YerPhI)
- Abram Alikhanov, nuclear physicist, one of the founders of nuclear physics in USSR, founder of the first nuclear reactor of USSR, founder of the Institute for Theoretical and Experimental Physics (ITEP)
- Gurgen Askaryan, physicist, inventor of light self focusing
- Paris Herouni, projected and built the world's first radio-optical telescope
- Mishik Kazaryan, physicist specialising in laser physics and optics
- Samvel Kocharyants, nuclear scientist, developer of the first Soviet nuclear warheads for ballistic missiles
- Aram Nalbandyan, Soviet physicist, prominent in the field of physical chemistry
- Yuri Oganessian, nuclear physicist in the Joint Institute for Nuclear Research (JINR); co-discoverer of the heaviest elements in the periodic table, element Oganesson.
- Yuri Osipyan, physicist, author of fundamental contribution to the physics of movements in solid bodies and inventor of photoplastic effect
- Kirill Shchelkin, physicist, in the former Soviet program of nuclear weapons who made theoretical and experimental contribution in combustion and gas dynamics.
- Karen Ter-Martirosian, theoretical physicist, author of fundamental contributions to quantum mechanics and quantum field theory; founder of the Elementary Particle Physics chair of the MIPT

==== Political Science ====
- Georgy Shakhnazarov, one of the founders of political science in USSR

=== Nobel Laureates ===
==== Laureates ====
- Daron Acemoglu, Nobel Prize for Economics in 2024
- Ardem Patapoutian, Nobel Prize for Medicine in 2021
- Emmanuele Charpentier, Nobel Prize for Chemistry in 2020, Armenian grandfather
- Dork Sahagian, Nobel Peace Prize in 2007 as a part of IPCC

==== Nominees ====
- Ruben Vardanyan, Nobel Prize for Peace in 2024
- Armen Alchian, Nobel Prize for Economics in 1986
- Giacomo Luigi Ciamician, Nobel Prize for Chemistry from 1905 to 1921

== Sportspeople ==
=== Boxing ===
- Arthur Abraham, professional boxer, WBO and IBF world champion
- Madame Bey, American boxing trainer who ran a boxing camp for world champion boxers.
- Khoren Gevor, German professional boxer, European Champion who fought for the WBA, IBF, and WBO world titles.
- Mekhak Ghazaryan, retired amateur boxer who won the European Championship title in the 1987 European Amateur Boxing Championships.
- Susi Kentikian, German former professional boxer, former WBO, WBA, and WIBF world champion.
- Kirkor Kirkorov, retired Bulgarian boxer who won the World Amateur Championships in 1991.
- Vanes Martirosyan, American former professional boxer, who challenged for the WBA, WBO, and the IBC world championships.
- Vladimir Yengibaryan, Soviet light-welterweight boxer, who was an Olympic champion, three-time European champion and three-time Soviet champion.

=== Chess ===
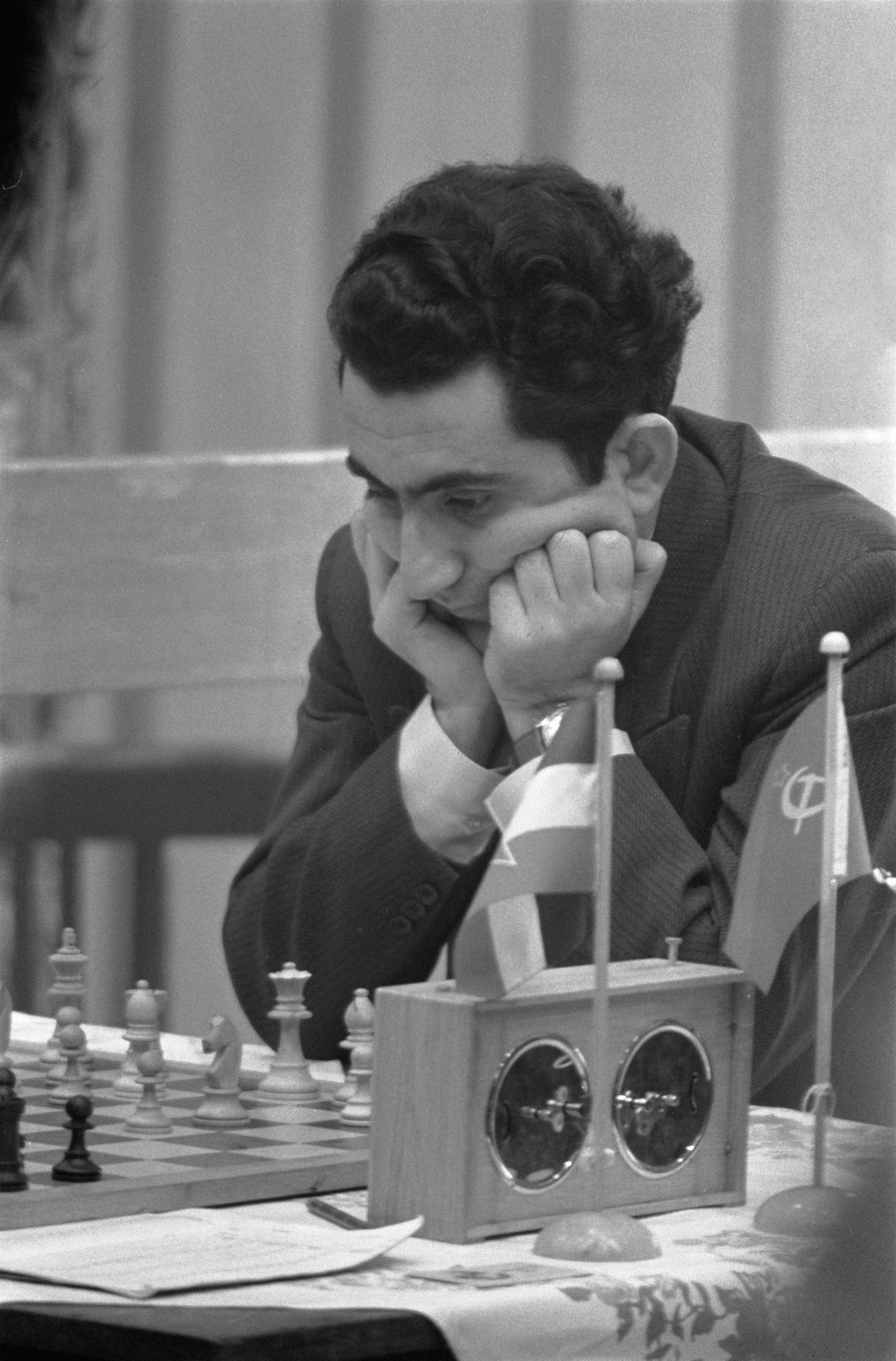
Tigran Petrosyan, chess grandmaster and the ninth World Chess Champion

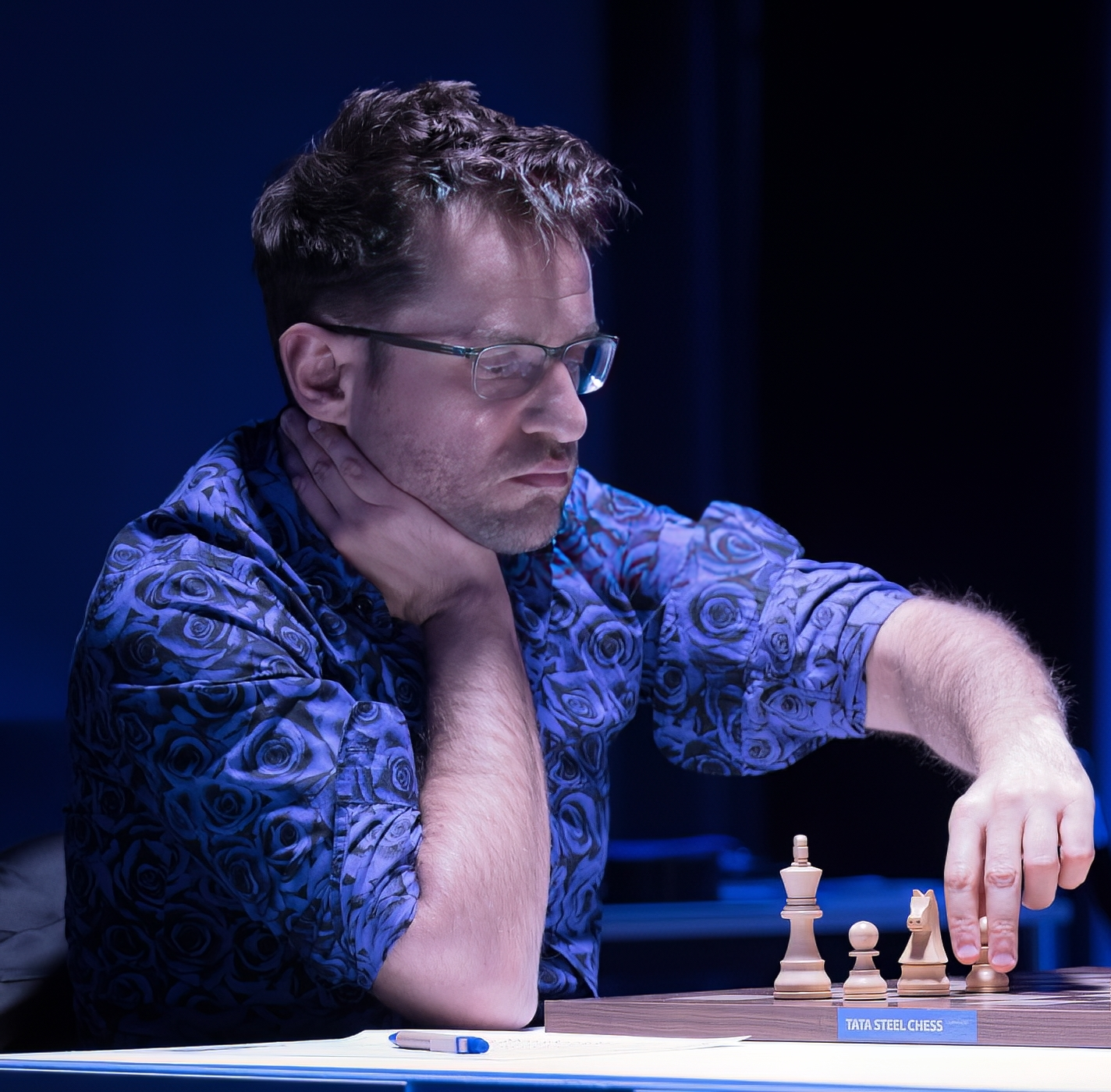
Levon Aronyan, the fourth highest-rated player in history

- Levon Aronian, chess player, a former blitz champion. His highest classical ranking was No. 2 position in the March 2014 FIDE world chess rankings with a rating of 2830, becoming the fourth highest-rated player in history.
- Varuzhan Akobian, American chess Grandmaster
- Zaven Andriasian, chess Grandmaster and former World Junior Chess Champion
- Giorgi Bagaturov, chess grandmaster, a three-time Georgian Chess Champion
- Elina Danielian, chess grandmaster and six-time Armenian women's champion
- Avetik Grigoryan, chess Grandmaster
- Hovik Hayrapetyan, became the Armenian Chess Solving Champion
- Garry Kasparov, world chess champion, one of the greatest chess players of all time
- Genrikh Kasparyan, considered to have been one of the greatest composers of chess endgame studies
- Smbat Lputian, chess grandmaster
- Sergei Movsesian, awarded the title Grandmaster by FIDE
- Tigran Petrosian, world chess champion

=== Gymnastics ===
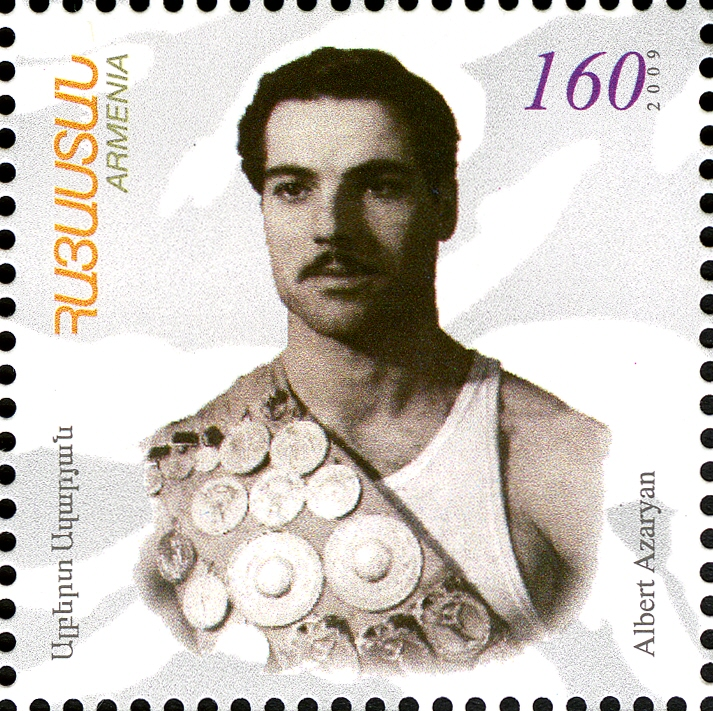
Albert Azaryan

- Albert Azaryan, the 1956 and 1960 Olympic Champion on the still rings
- Eduard Azaryan, Olympic Champion and four-time Soviet Champion, and Azaryan was awarded the Honoured Master of Sport of the USSR title in 1980.
- Artur Davtyan, the 2022 World Champion on vault
- Hamlet Manukyan, 2023 Junior World Champion
- Harutyun Merdinyan, two-time European champion
- Hrant Shahinyan, Olympic Champion, two-time World Champion and seven-time USSR Champion

=== Football ===
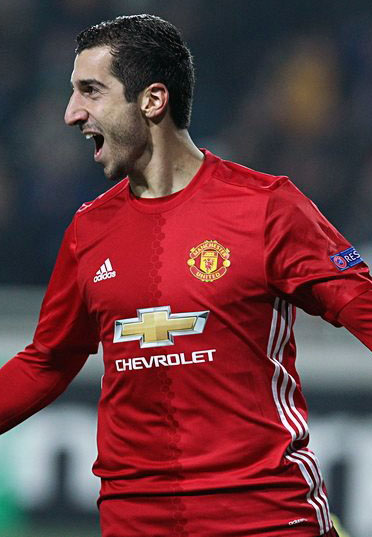
Henrikh Mkhitaryan, professional footballer

- Henrikh Mkhitaryan, high level football player who competed at the elite level most notably in Serie A and the Premier League. He is widely regarded as the greatest player in Armenian footballing history.
- Alyosha Abrahamyan, played as a goalkeeper for FC Ararat Yerevan
- Sargis Adamyan, football player who played in Germany in the Bundesliga
- Arkady Andreasyan, football player and manager
- Armen Babalaryan, football midfielder
- Roman Berezovsky, football coach and a former goalkeeper
- Alain Boghossian, footballer
- André Calisir, footballer
- Artak Dashyan, footballer
- Youri Djorkaeff, football player
- Gurgen Engibaryan, played as a midfielder
- Artyom Falyan, football manager and a player
- Vardan Ghazaryan, football coach
- Eduard Grigoryan, football player
- Varazdat Haroyan, footballer who plays as a central defender
- Eduard Markarov, Soviet football player
- Yura Movsisyan, football player
- Nikita Simonyan, football player who played for Russian team FC Spartak Moscow majority of his career.

=== Wrestlers ===
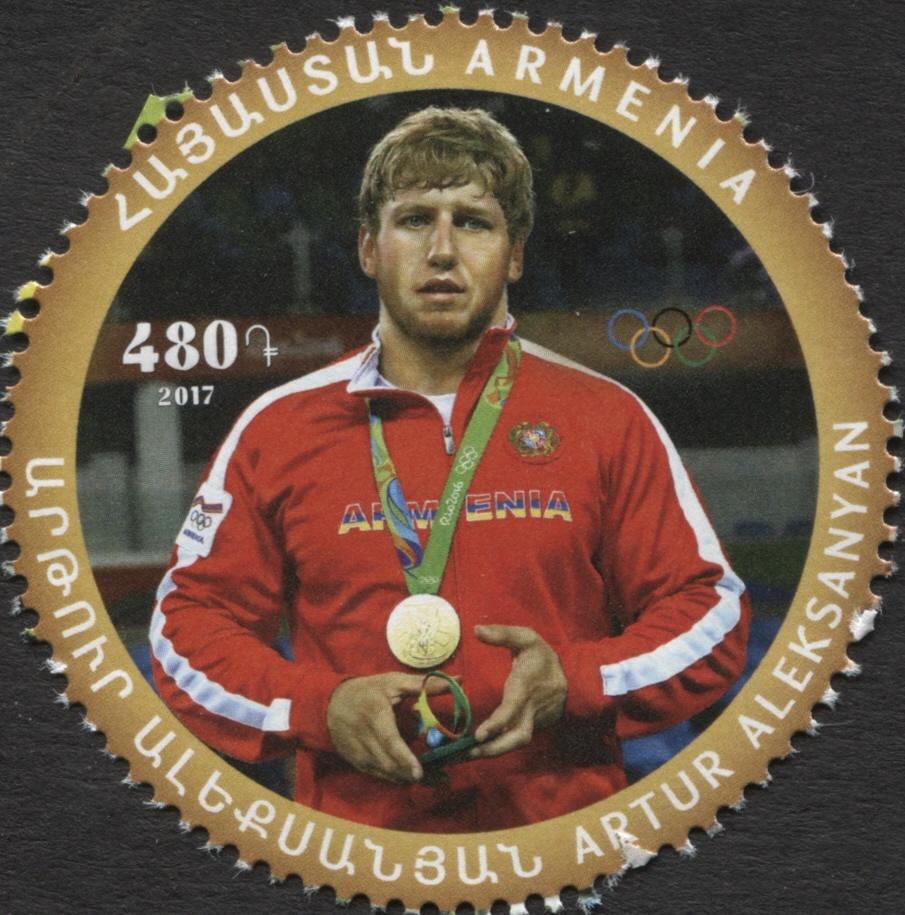
Artur Aleksanyan

- Artur Aleksanyan, Olympic champion, seven-time European champion, four-time World champion
- Arayik Gevorgyan, three-time World champion
- Arsen Harutyunyan, four-time European champion
- Armen Mkrtchyan, Olympic silver medalist
- Armen Nazaryan, two-time Olympic Champion
- Seth Rollins, Pro Wrestler who won many world championships including the WWE Championship, World Heavyweight Championship and the first ever WWE Universal Championship.

=== Weightlifters ===
- Varazdat Lalayan, Olympic silver medalist and European champion
- Simon Martirosyan, two-time Olympic silver medalist, two-time World and European champion
- Tigran Martirosyan, World champion, and three-time European champion
- Israel Militosyan, World champion and Olympic silver medalist
- Oksen Mirzoyan, European, World and Olympic Champion
- Yurik Vardanyan, Olympic champion, seven-time World champion and five-time European champion, was the world's first weightlifter to achieve a 400 kilogram total in the 82.5 kg weight category. He earned the title Honoured Master of Sports of the USSR in 1977 and was awarded the Order of Lenin in 1985. In 1994 he was elected a member of the International Weightlifting Federation Hall of Fame.

=== Kickboxers ===
- Sahak Parparyan, world champion in It's Showtime.
- Harut Grigorian, world champion in GLORY.
- Marat Grigorian, world champion in GLORY.
- Giorgio Petrosyan, often regarded as the greatest kickboxer of all time having also won world titles, tournaments in K-1, One Championship, ISKA, WAKO, and GLORY.
- Gago Drago, champion in Europe, two time K-1 world max finalist and Enfusion tournament winner and runner up for It's Showtime world title.
- Melsik Baghdasaryan, fought for the K-1 world title.
- Karapet Karapetyan, tournament winner in It's Showtime, fought for world titles including the WBC Muay Thai, Enfusion, and GLORY.
- Armen Petrosyan (kickboxer), world champion in ISKA and World Muay Thai Association.
- Edmond Tarverdyan, held the WBC US Muay Thai Champion and as a trainer he trained former UFC Bantamweight Champion Ronda Rousey, Travis Browne, Jake Ellenberger, boxer Art Hovhannisyan and Edmen Shahbazyan.
- Jegish Yegoian, world champion in ISKA.

=== Mixed Martial Arts ===
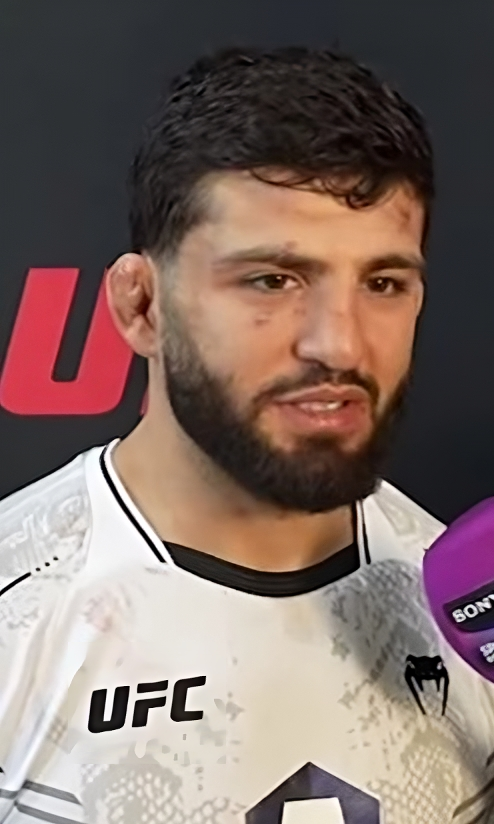
Arman Tsarukyan

- Arman Tsarukyan, ranked 2nd in the UFC
- Edmen Shahbazyan, active UFC fighter.
- Kenny Florian, former UFC title challenger.
- Karo Parisyan, retired UFC fighter who also held the WEC world title.
- Armen Petrosyan (fighter), former UFC fighter.
- Gegard Mousasi, retired UFC fighter and former Strikeforce, and Bellator world champion.
- Karen Darabedyan, former WEC fighter.
- Manny Gamburyan, former UFC fighter who also fought for the WEC world title.
- Dillon Danis, former Bellator fighter and Jiu Jitsu player who managed to win gold in Pan Jiu-Jitsu No-Gi Championship twice as a brown belt in 2016.
- Sako Chivitchian, former UFC fighter.
- Neil Melanson, mma coach who trained Randy Couture, Gray Maynard, Todd Duffee, Chael Sonnen, Vitor Belfort, Anthony Johnson, Patrick Cummins, Michael Chandler and Bryan Danielson.
- Gokor Chivichyan, mma coach: Black Belt Magazine named Chivichyan the “Judo Instructor of the Year” in 1997 and inducted him into their hall of fame. His school has produced fighters such as Manvel Gamburyan, Sako Chivitchian, Neil Melanson Karen Darabedyan, Roman Mitichyan, Ronda Rousey, and Karo Parisyan.
- Roman Mitichyan, former UFC fighter and actor who acted in Furious 7, John Wick, Fear The Walking Dead and many more.

=== Tennis Players ===
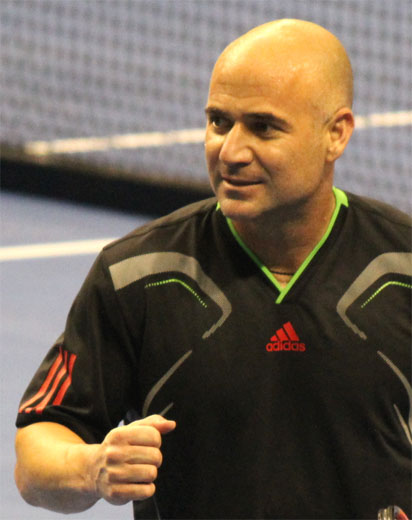
Andre Agassi

- Andre Agassi, he is regarded by many as one of the greatest tennis players of all time.
- Elina Avanesyan, she has a career-high WTA singles ranking of No. 36, achieved on 17 March 2025 and a best doubles ranking of No. 163, achieved on 12 August 2024. She is currently the No. 1 singles player from Armenia.
- Sargis Sargsian, he reached career-high rankings of World No. 38 in singles and World No. 33 in doubles, winning one singles and two doubles titles on the ATP Tour. Sargsian finished 8 seasons in the top 100 ATP year-end rankings.
- Karen Khachanov, professional tennis player, who was ranked by the Association of Tennis Professionals (ATP) as high as world No. 8 in singles.

=== American Football ===
- Ben Agajanian, two time NFL champion and one of the first kicking specialists in pro-football.
- Alex Agase, NFL champion guard and linebacker; head coach for Northwestern and Purdue; inductee into the College Football Hall of Fame.
- Steve Furness, four time Super Bowl champion defensive tackle and member of the Pittsburgh Steelers' Steel Curtain.
- Ara Parseghian, halfback and defensive back for the Cleveland Browns; head coach for Notre Dame, leading the team to two National championships; inductee into the College Football Hall of Fame.
- Brock Purdy (from grandmother), quarterback for the San Francisco 49ers.
- Garo Yepremian, two time Super Bowl champion and first team All-Pro kicker.

=== Baseball ===
- Cam Bedrosian (born 1991), MLB pitcher for the Los Angeles Angels, Cincinnati Reds, Oakland Athletics, and Philadelphia Phillies.
- Steve Bedrosian (born 1957), MLB pitcher who won one Cy Young Award and one World Series.
- Chuck Essegian (born 1931), MLB pitcher who won one World Series, where he set the Series record with his two pinch-hit home runs.
- Jim Essian (born 1951), MLB catcher and former manager for the Chicago Cubs.
- Chris Hacopian (born 2004), MLB second basemen for the Washington Nationals.
- James Kaprielian (born 1994), pitcher for the Guerreros de Oaxaca and Oakland Athletics.
- Tim Kurkjian (born 1956), MLB analyst on ESPN's Baseball Tonight.
- Perry Minasian (born 1980), general manager for the Los Angeles Angels.
- Zack Minasian, general manager for the San Francisco Giants.

=== Hockey ===
- Zach Bogosian, NHL defenseman for the Atlanta Thrashers, Winnipeg Jets, Buffalo Sabres, Tampa Bay Lightning, Toronto Maple Leafs, and Minnesota Wild; winner of the Stanley Cup as a member of the Lightning in 2020.
- Eddie Jeremiah, NHL player; head coach for Dartmouth.
- Grigory Mkrtychan, Olympic gold-medalist and Ice Hockey World Champion goalkeeper for the Soviet Union.

=== Other sportspeople ===
- Krikor Agathon, sport shooter and épée fencer, was awarded Legion of Honour.
- Armenak Alachachian, basketball player and coach who was one of the best shooters in Soviet basketball and was the first person to ever win a EuroLeague title, as both a player and a head coach.
- Robert Emmiyan, long jumper, he is the fourth best long jumper in history. His personal best jump of 8.86 metres, which he achieved in Tsaghkadzor in May 1987, is the current European record.
- Adam Krikorian, women's water polo coach who led UCLA to 11 NCAA championships and Team USA to 3 Olympic gold medals.
- Tom Mooradian, basketball player and coach
- Levon Pashabezyan, taekwondo athlete, who won a gold medal at the 2003 Youth European Taekwondo Championships.
- Adeliia Petrosian, 3 time Russian national champion figure skater.
- Rich Piana, Famous Bodybuilder
- Alain Prost, formula one racer, who managed to win four Formula One World Drivers' Championship titles and—at the time of his retirement—held the records for most wins (51), fastest laps (41), and podium finishes (106).

== Law ==
=== Judges ===
- Sian Elias (born 1949), 12th Chief Justice of New Zealand.
- Alvina Gyulumyan (born 1956), Justice, Constitutional Court of Armenia; judge, European Court of Human Rights.
- Armen Harutyunyan (born 1964), Judge, European Court of Human Rights.
- Gagik Harutyunyan (born 1948), President, Constitutional Court of Armenia.
- Arevik Petrosyan (born 1972), Justice, Constitutional Court of Armenia.
- Lilit Tadevosyan (born 1978), President, Court of Cassation of Armenia.
- Gabrielle Wolohojian (born 1960), Associate Justice of the Massachusetts Supreme Judicial Court.

=== Lawyers ===
- Mark Geragos (born 1957), American criminal defense lawyer who has represented many celebrities such as Michael Jackson, Winona Ryder, and Kesha.
- Robert Kardashian (1944—2003), American attorney famous for his role as defense attorney in the Murder trial of O. J. Simpson.
- Vartkes Yeghiayan, American attorney specializing in international law

== Businesspeople ==
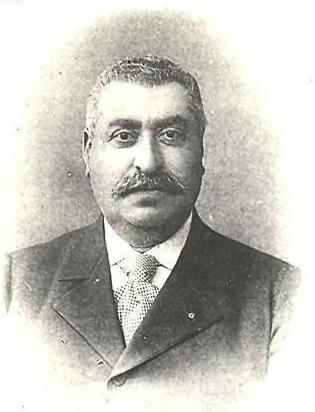
Alexander Mantashev, prominent Russian oil magnate, industrialist, financier, and a philanthropist, become one of the world's wealthiest individuals

- Semyon Abamelek-Lazarev (1857–1916), prince, Russian millionaire
- Ara Abramyan (b. 1957), prominent philanthropist, social activist, and businessman
- Apcar Alexander Apcar (1851–1913), wealthy businessman in Calcutta
- Mikael Aramyants (1843–1923), oil magnate, industrialist, financier, and a philanthropist
- Set Khan Astvatsatourian (1780–1842), businessman, Iran's ambassador to Great Britain
- Lev Atamanov (1901–1981), director of Soyuzmultfilm, one of the foremost Soviet animation film directors and one of the founders of Soviet animation art
- Gerard Cafesjian (1925–2013), businessman and philanthropist who founded the Cafesjian Family Foundation
- Paul Chater (1846–1926), businessman, Senior Unofficial Member of the Executive Council
- Richard Donchian (1905–1993), pioneer Wall Street financier
- Eduardo Eurnekian (b. 1932), owner of airports in Argentina, and Yerevan Airport
- Larry Gagosian (b. 1945), founder of Gagosian Gallery
- Sergey Galitsky (b. 1967), founder of Magnit
- Vartan Gregorian (1934–2021), president of Carnegie Corporation, awarded Presidential Medal of Freedom
- Calouste Gulbenkian (1869–1955), first person to exploit Iraqi oil
- Paul Kazarian (b. 1955), founder of Japonica Partners
- Dikran Kelekian (1867–1951), notable collector and dealer of Islamic art
- Kirk Kerkorian (1917–2015), built the world's largest hotel in Las Vegas three times, National Hero of Armenia
- Ivan Lazarev (1735–1801), was a financier and millionaire
- Stepan Lianozov (1872–1951), impact on the oil industry in Baku was considerable and became known as the "Russian Rockefeller"
- Alex Manoogian (1901–1996), founder of Masco, National Hero of Armenia
- Alexander Mantashev (1842–1911), Russian oil magnate
- Artem Mikoyan (1905–1970), founder of Mikoyan, MiG
- Ivan Mirzoev (d. 1870), businessman, the first person to drill oil in Baku and is considered one of the "founding fathers" of the Baku oil industry
- Stephen P. Mugar (1901–1982), businessman in the United States, founder of the Star Market
- Alexis Ohanian (b. 1983), co-founder and former executive chairman of the social media site Reddit
- Simeon of Poland (1584–1639), Polish traveler
- Nikita Simonyan (1926–2025), First Vice-president of the Russian Football Union
- Karen Shakhnazarov (b. 1952), became the director general of Mosfilm
- Alex Yemenidjian (b. 1955), former CEO and chairman of MGM Studios

== Other ==
- Ivan Agayants, Deputy director of the First Chief Directorate
- George Avakian, founding officer of the National Academy of Recording Arts and Sciences
- Lev Berberov, owner of famous lions that appeared in films
- Krikor Bogharian, diarist and genocide survivor
- Artur Chilingarov, polar explorer, a corresponding member of the Russian Academy of Science, awarded Hero of the Soviet Union and the title of Hero of the Russian Federation
- Alexandra Elbakyan, creator of Sci-Hub
- Sabiha Gökçen (possibly), the world's first female fighter pilot
- Karen Hekimyan, political figure and chemist
- Ed Iskenderian, One of Chevrolet's "Legends of Performance"
- Berç Türker Keresteciyan, bank executive and politician
- Ruth Roche, friend and confidante of Queen Elizabeth The Queen Mother
- Alex Seropian, video game developer who founded Bungie
- Soghomon Tehlirian, revolutionary and soldier who assassinated Talaat Pasha
- Gevork Vartanian, Soviet intelligence officer responsible for thwarting Operation Long Jump; Awarded Hero of the Soviet Union

== Fictional ==
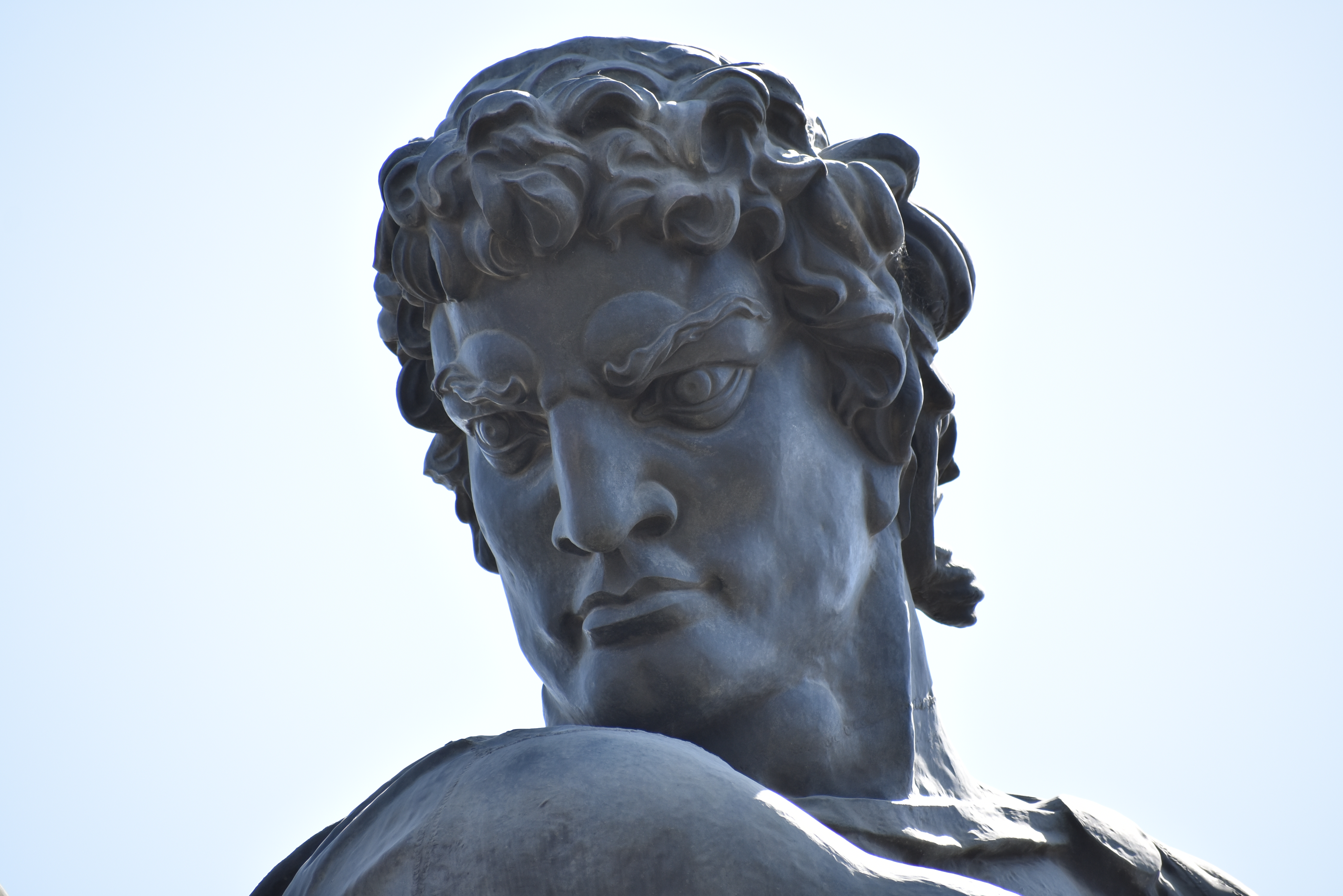
Statue of David of Sassoun from national epic Daredevils of Sassoun

- Petra Arkanian, secondary character in Orson Scott Card's novel Ender's Game and a primary character in subsequent sequels such as Shadow of the Hegemon
- Dona Armênia (Arakel Tchobanian Giovani), character in the Brazilian telenovela Rainha da Sucata played by actress Aracy Balabanian, of Armenian descent herself
- Dany Devedjian, character in the French criminal drama Les Lyonnais
- Margos Dezerian, hit man for the Mob on The Shield
- Vrej Esphanian, galley slave, Armenian trader in Neal Stephenson's The Baroque Cycle
- Rabo Karabekian, protagonist of Kurt Vonnegut's 1987 book Bluebeard
- Max Kerkerian, character in Les rivières pourpres, detective inspector, starring Vincent Cassel
- Vin Makazian, detective in the TV series The Sopranos, played by John Heard
- Melik Nachararyan, character in the novel Ali and Nino
- Camille Saroyan, character in the TV Series Bones
- Armin Tamzarian, Simpsons character better known as Principal Seymour Skinner
- Eva Khatchadourian, protagonist of Lionel Shriver's 2003 novel We Need to Talk About Kevin

=== Legendary ===
- David of Sassoun
- Hayk Nahapet
- Ara the Handsome
