= List of Armenian Americans =

This is a list of notable Armenian Americans, including both original immigrants who obtained American citizenship and their American descendants. Armenian Americans are people born or raised in the United States, or who reside there, with origins in the country known as Armenia, which ranges from the Caucasian mountain range to the Armenian plateau.

There has been sporadic emigration from Armenia to the U.S. since the late 19th century, with the biggest influx coming after the Armenian genocide of the early 20th century. The largest community in the United States is based in Los Angeles; however, other sizable communities exist in Boston, Detroit and the New York metropolitan area. Statistics from the United States 2000 Census, there are 385,488 Americans indicated either full or partial Armenian ancestry.

== Academia ==
- Daron Acemoglu, economist at Massachusetts Institute of Technology
- Viken Babikian, professor at Boston University School of Medicine
- Peter Balakian, professor of humanities at Colgate University
- Paul Boghossian, professor of philosophy at New York University
- Peter Boghossian, former professor of philosophy
- Aram Chobanian, Dean of Boston University School of Medicine
- Richard Dekmejian, professor at University of Southern California
- James Der Derian, Watson Institute professor of International Studies and Political Science at Brown University
- Edward Goljan, professor of Pathology at Oklahoma State University Center for Health Sciences
- Vartan Gregorian (1934–2021), former President of Brown University and the Carnegie Corporation, 'savior' of the New York Public Library
- Edgar Housepian, neurosurgeon, Professor Emeritus of neurosurgery at Columbia University Medical School, and co-founder of the Fund for Armenia (FAR)
- Marjorie Housepian Dobkin (1922–2013), professor of English at Barnard College and author
- Richard G. Hovannisian, professor of Armenian History at UCLA
- Raffi Indjejikian, professor of accounting a University of Michigan
- Joseph Albert Kechichian, author
- Mark Krikorian, executive director of Center for Immigration Studies
- Robert Mehrabian, President of Carnegie Mellon
- Gevork Minaskanian, professor of organic chemistry at Virginia Commonwealth University
- Louise Nalbandian (1926-1974), historian at California State University, Fresno
- Ara Nazarian, biomedical engineer, academic, and entrepreneur
- Ardem Patapoutian, winner of 2021 Nobel Prize in Physiology or Medicine for "discoveries of receptors for temperature and touch" (jointly with David Julius)
- Josh Pahigian, professor of global humanities at the University of New England
- George Piranian, professor of mathematics at the University of Michigan
- Barbara Sahakian, professor of clinical neuropsychology at University of Cambridge
- Mark Saroyan, professor of Soviet studies at Harvard and UC Berkeley
- Harold Takooshian, psychologist and professor at Fordham University
Armenian Americans in academia

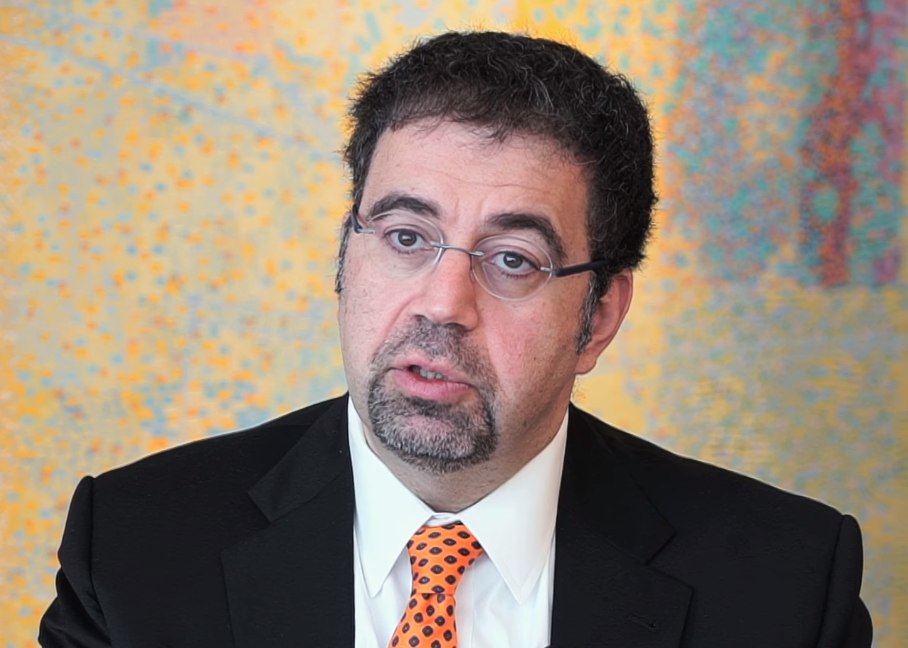
Daron Acemoglu

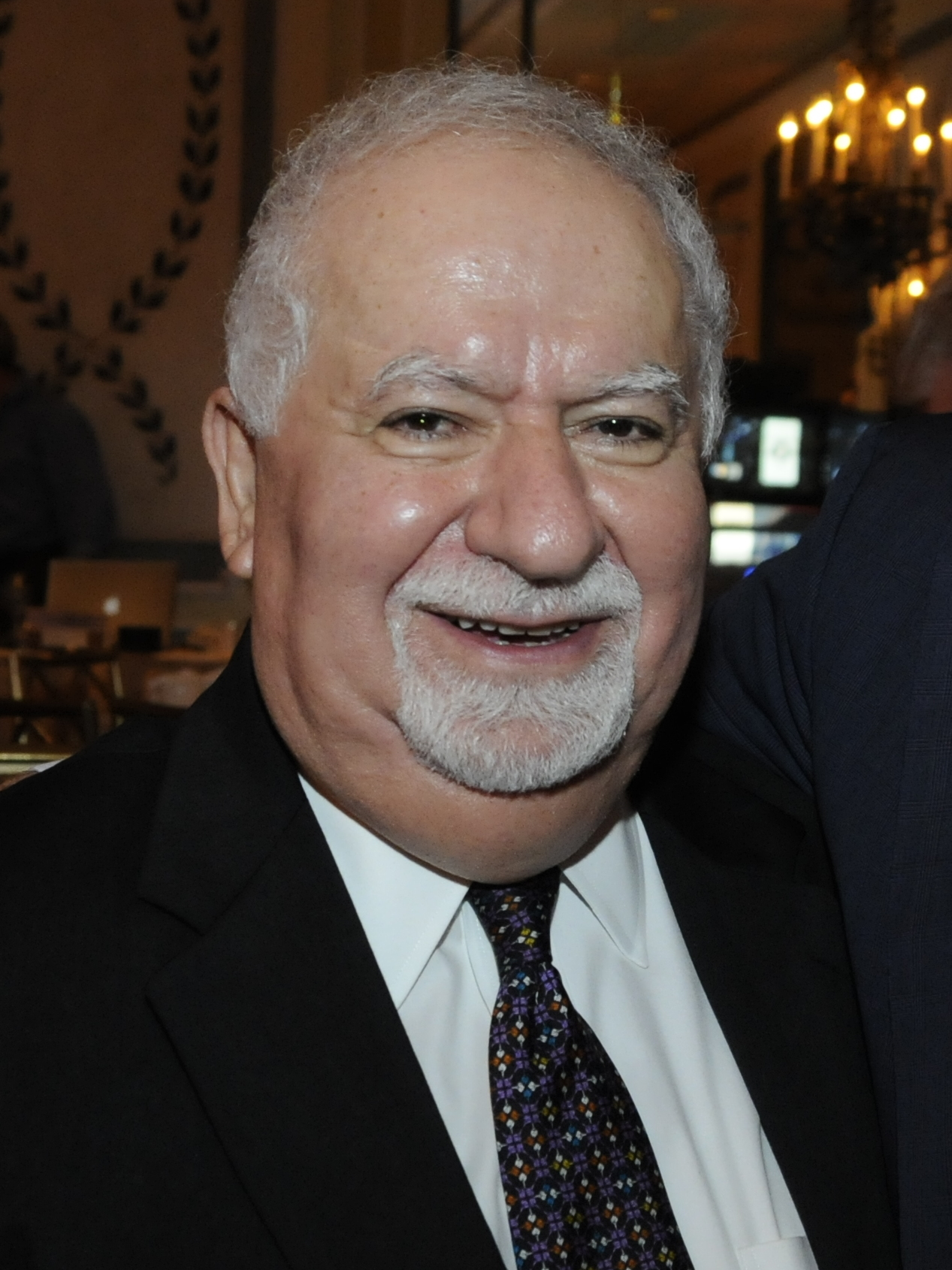
Vartan Gregorian

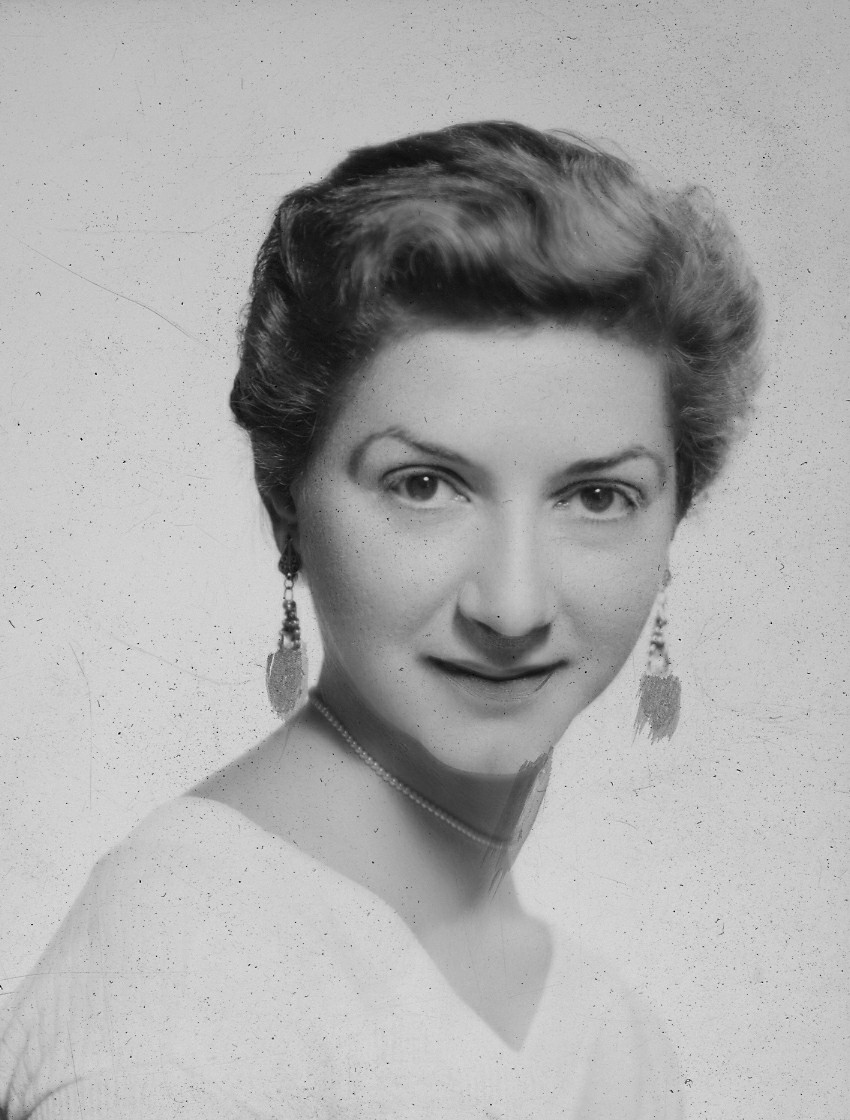
Marjorie Housepian Dobkin

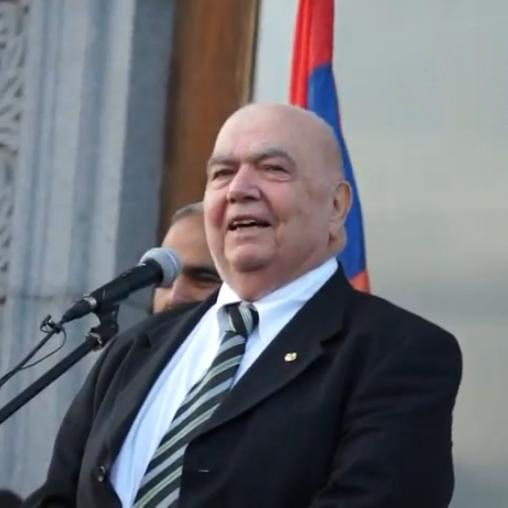
Richard Hovannisian

== Activism ==
- Bob Avakian, political activist and Chairman of the Revolutionary Communist Party
- Heidi Boghosian, privacy activist, attorney, and author
- Chaz Bono, LGBT rights activist and reality show personality (mixed origin, son of actress/singer Cher)
- Mark Krikorian, immigration-reform activist
- Anita Sarkeesian, Canadian-American, feminist media critic

== Actors, models, entertainers ==
- Marie Rose Abousefian, actress
- Paul Abrahamian, reality television personality
- James Adomian, actor and stand-up comedian
- Kay Armen, TV, film and stage actress
- Şahan Arzruni. pianist
- Val Avery, actor
- Richard Bakalyan, actor
- Adrienne Barbeau, actress (mother was of Armenian descent)
- Rowan Blanchard, actress, paternal great-grandmother was an Armenian from present-day Syria
- Eric Bogosian, playwright and performance artist
- Dan Bilzerian, Internet personality
- Bailey Sarian, Internet personality
- Christy Canyon, pornographic actress (Armenian father)
- Arthur Edmund Carewe (1884–1937), Armenian-born American actor in the silent and early sound film era
- Cher, singer and actress
- Mike Connors, television actor
- Leon Danielian, first U.S.-born ballet dancer to reach international recognition
- Anita Darian, singer and actress
- Ken Davitian, actor
- George Duran, chef and entertainer
- Naz Edwards, actress
- Colton Ford, former gay pornographic actor; singer
- Cyrinda Foxe, model and actress
- Arlene Francis, actress
- Victor French, prolific character actor, Armenian mother
- Michael A. Goorjian, actor and filmmaker
- Sid Haig, actor
- Alexandra Hedison, actress and director
- David Hedison, actor
- Dan Janjigian, actor and former bobsledder
- Karren Karagulian actor
- Khloé Kardashian, reality television star, media personality, businesswoman, socialite, and model
- Kim Kardashian, reality television star, socialite, model, businesswoman, producer, and actress
- Kourtney Kardashian, reality television star, media personality, socialite, and model
- Rob Kardashian, reality television star, businessman
- Sylva Kelegian, actress
- Marco Khan, actor
- Joe Manganiello, actor; maternal grandmother and mother were of Armenian descent
- Andrea Martin, comedian
- Eddie Mekka, actor
- Sona Movsesian, podcaster and executive assistant to Conan O'Brien
- Erik Palladino, actor (Armenian mother)
- Deran Sarafian, actor
- Angela Sarafyan, actress
- Lucy Saroyan, actress, photographer
- Adam G. Sevani, actor
- Akim Tamiroff, actor
- Callie Thorne, actor
- Mia Tyler, plus-size model
- Michael Vartan, actor; paternal great-grandfather was of Armenian descent
- Dita Von Teese, burlesque artist, model, and actress; her grandmother was of partial Armenian descent
- Geoffrey Zakarian, celebrity chef, television personality, Iron Chef, restaurateur, and author
Armenian American actors and models

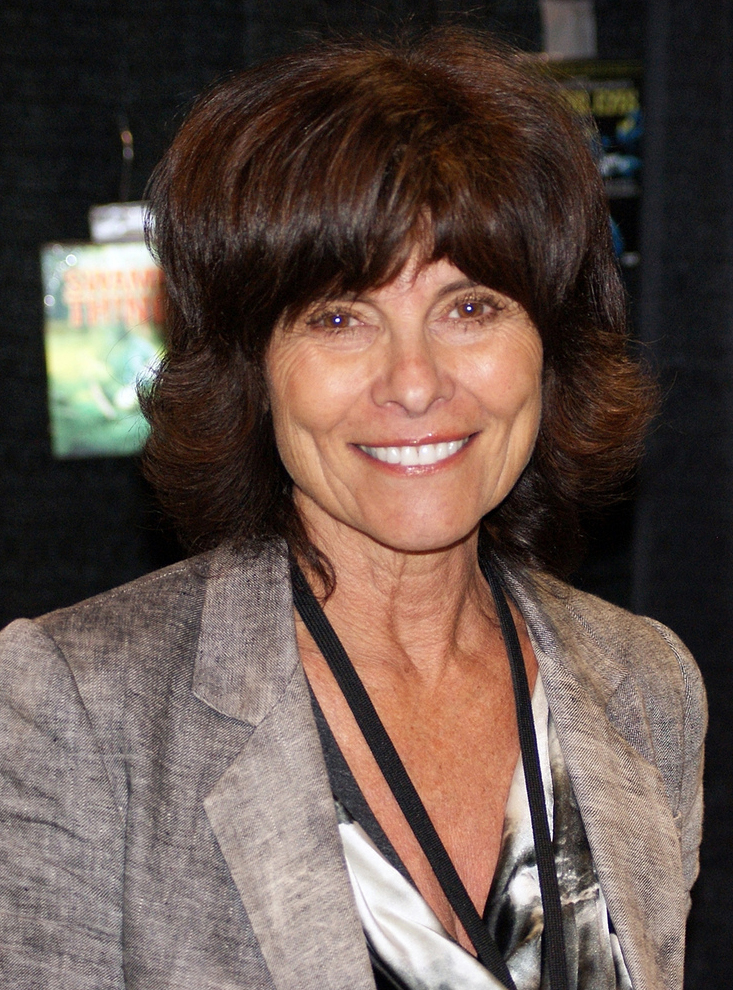

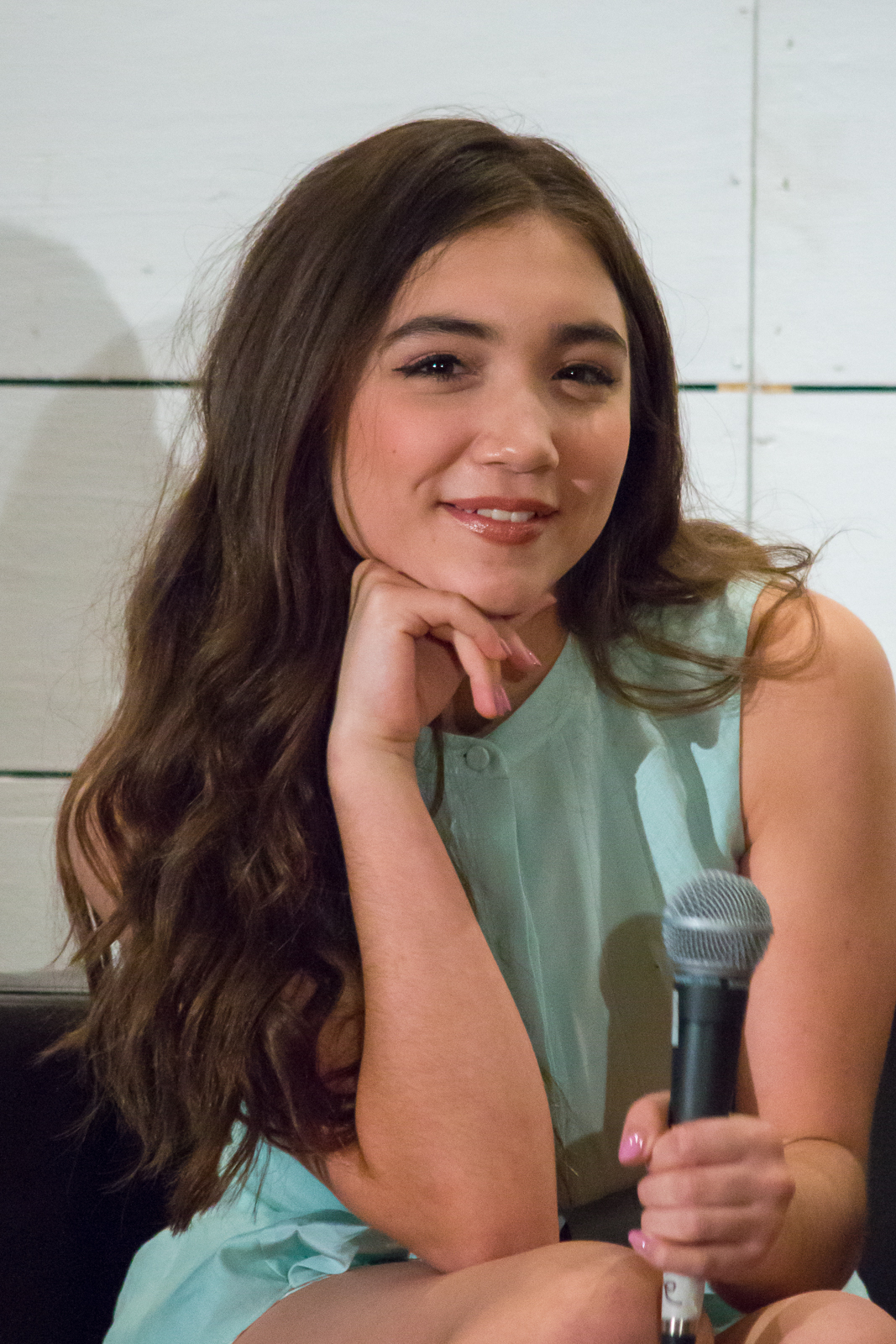

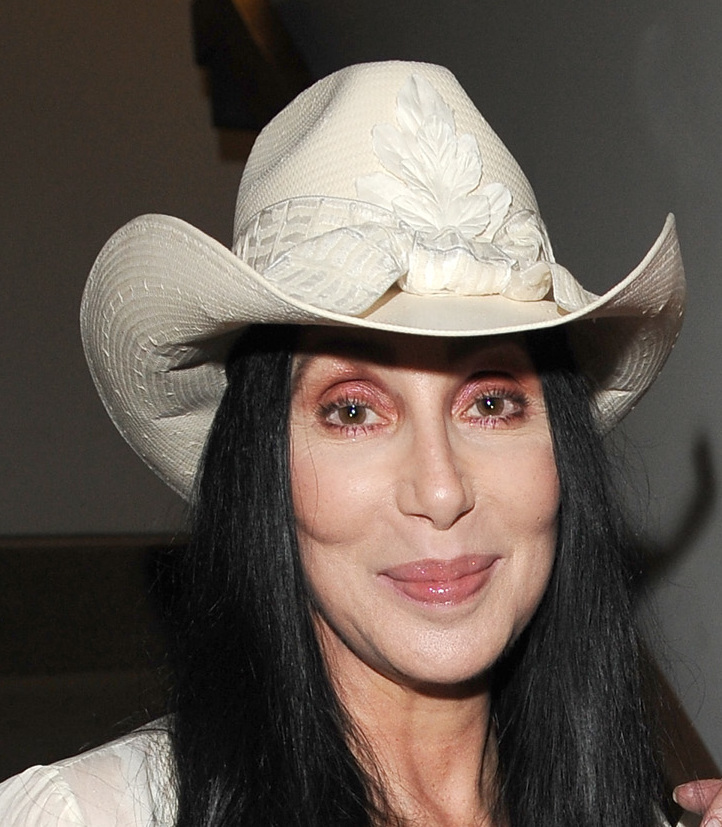

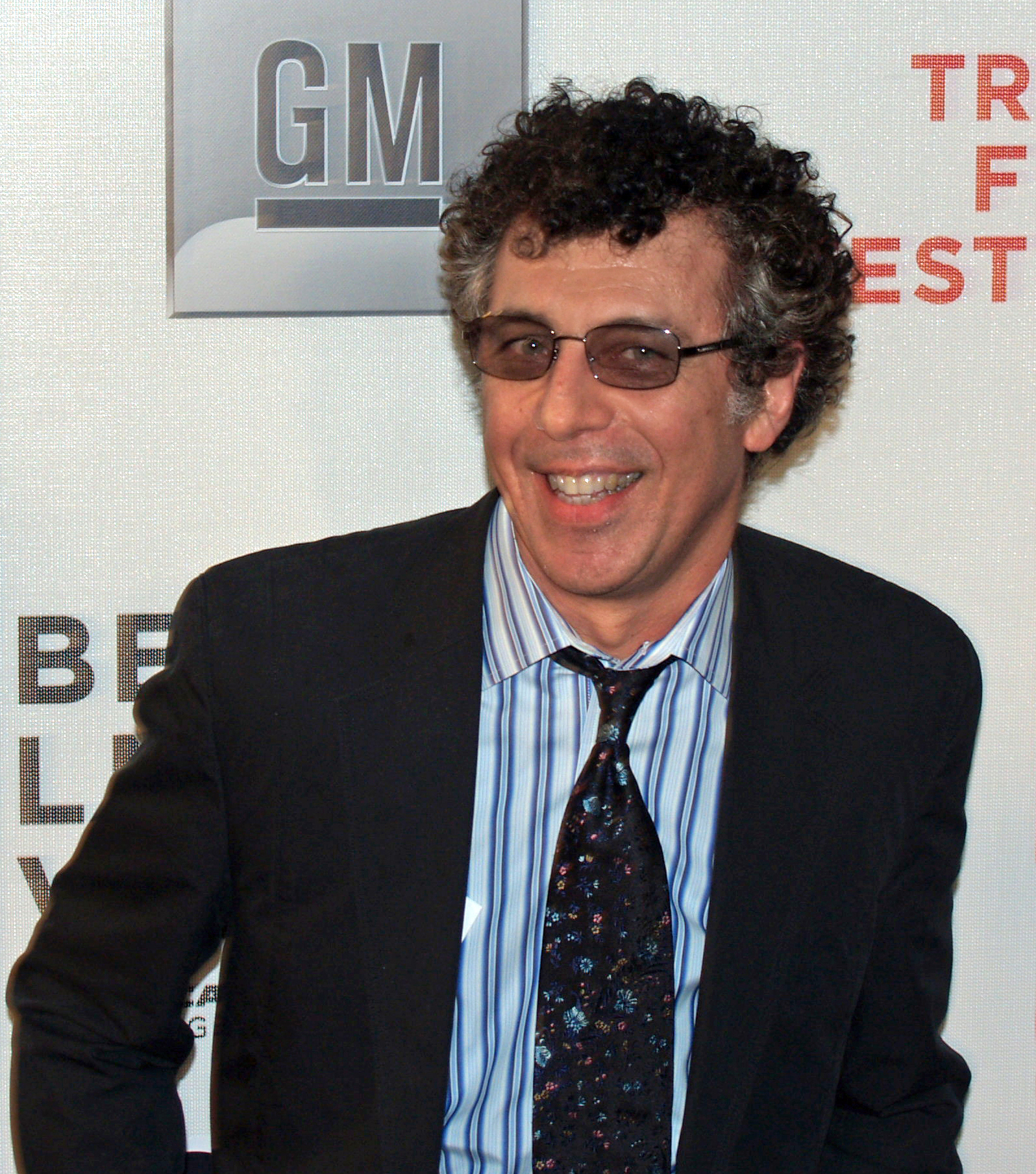

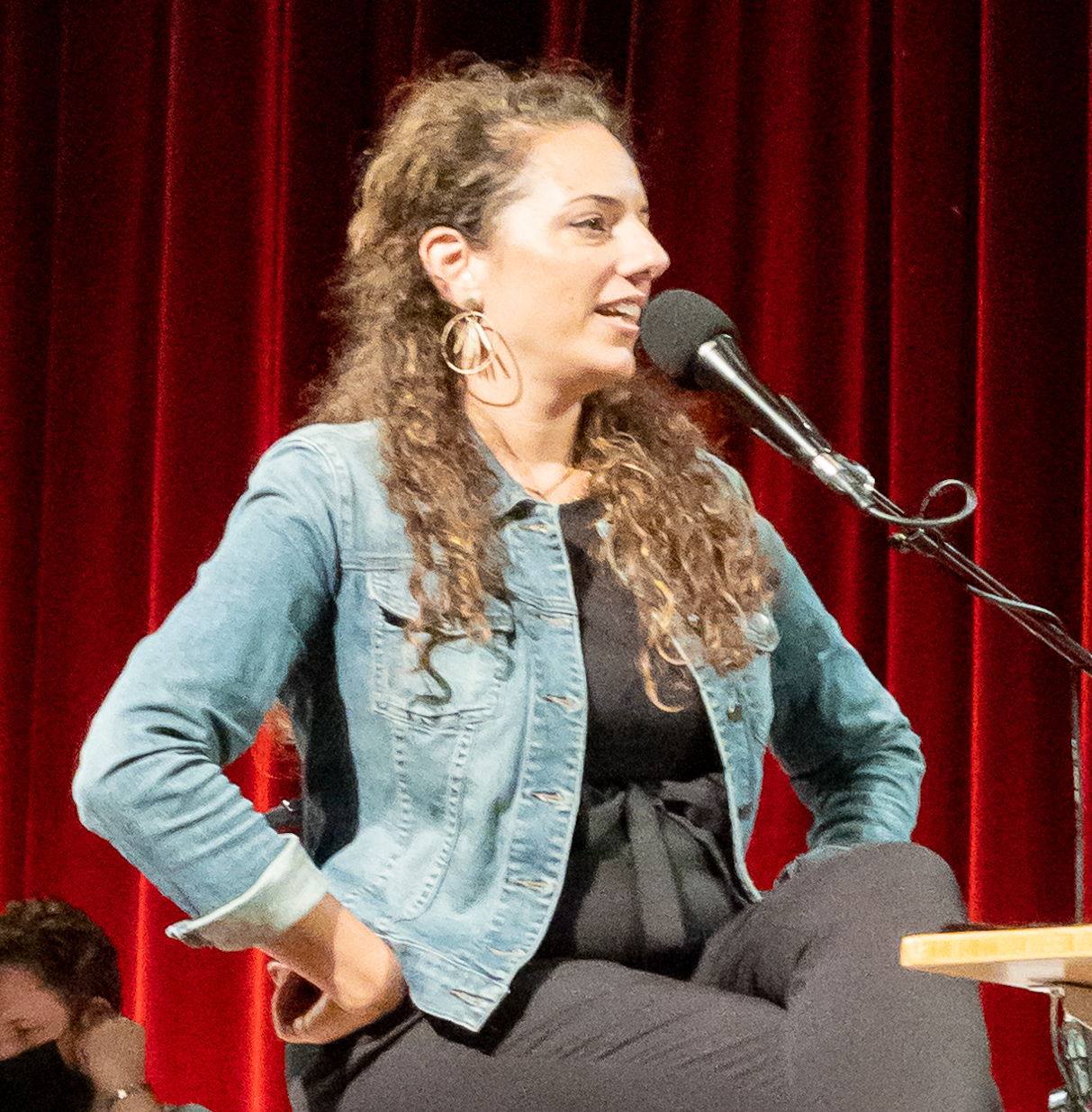

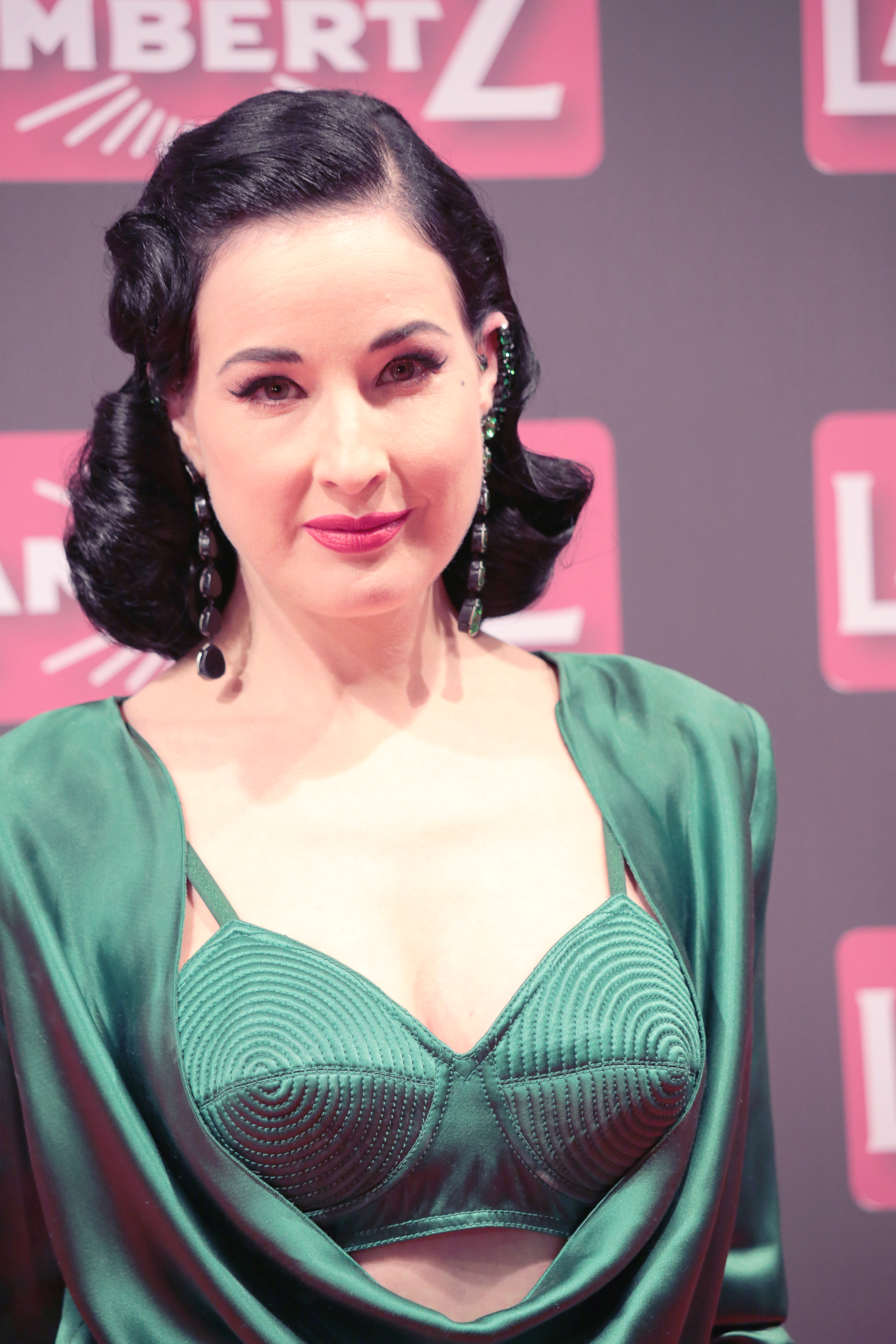

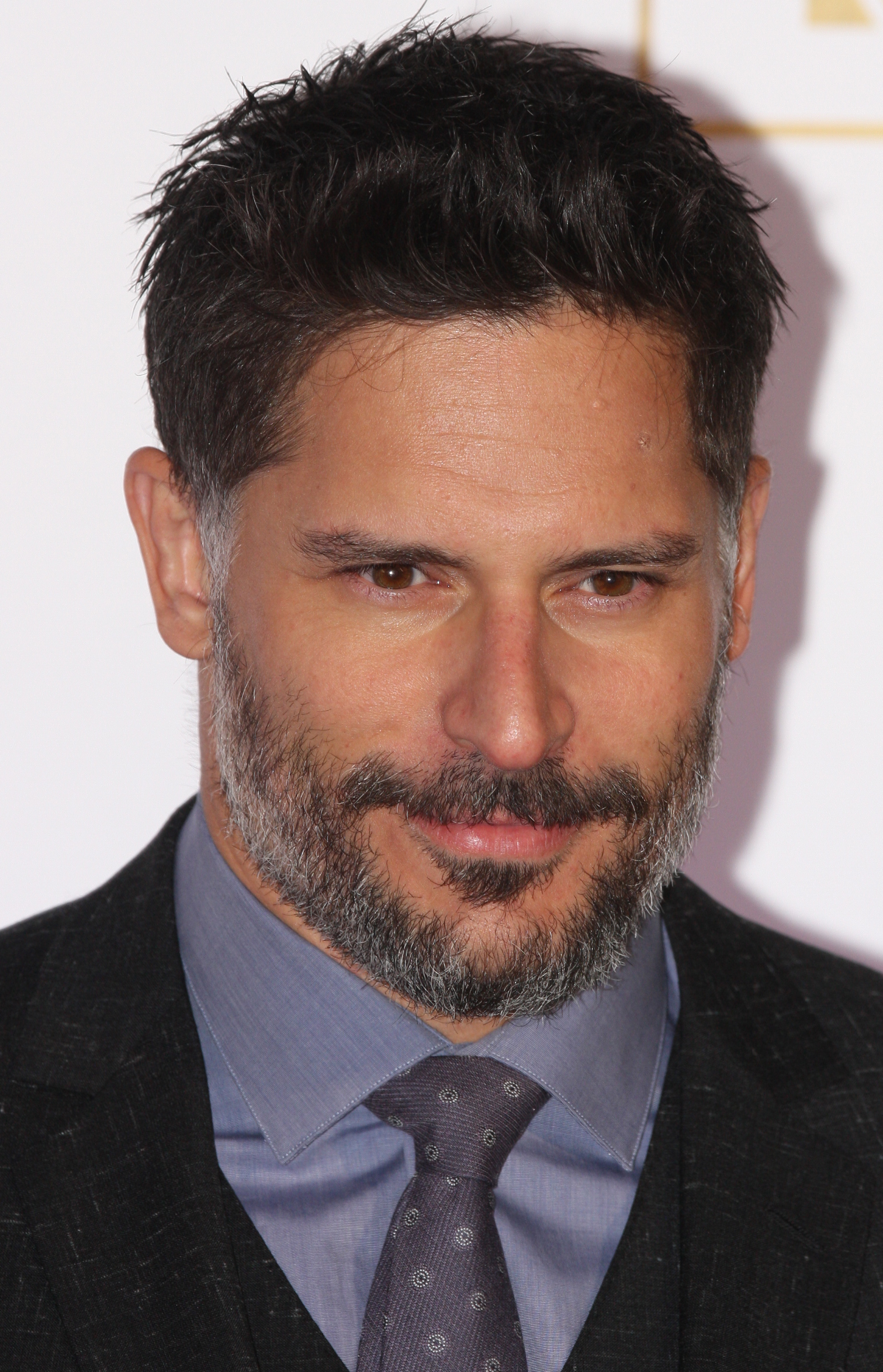

Ned J. Parsekian

== Art, design ==
- Dan Panosian, comic book artist
- Apo Avedissian, filmmaker, painter, photographer and writer
- Edward Avedisian, painter
- Greg Costikyan, game designer
- Ivan Dmitri, photographer
- Patricia Field, costume designer and fashion designer
- Arshile Gorky, painter
- Kaloust Guedel, painter
- Dikran Kelekian, art collector
- Dodie Kazanjian, art critic
- John Manoogian II, automobile designer
- Ludwig Mactarian, painter
- Alina Mnatsakanian, visual artist
- Reuben Nakian, sculptor
- Haig Patigian, sculptor
- Denis Peterson, painter
- Arthur Ashod Pinajian, comic book creator and artist
- Hovsep Pushman, painter
- Varaz Samuelian, sculptor
- Sam Tchakalian, painter
- Jacques Terzian, sculptor
- Edmund Yaghjian, painter, educator
- Alec Monopoly, graffiti artist
Armenian Americans in art and design

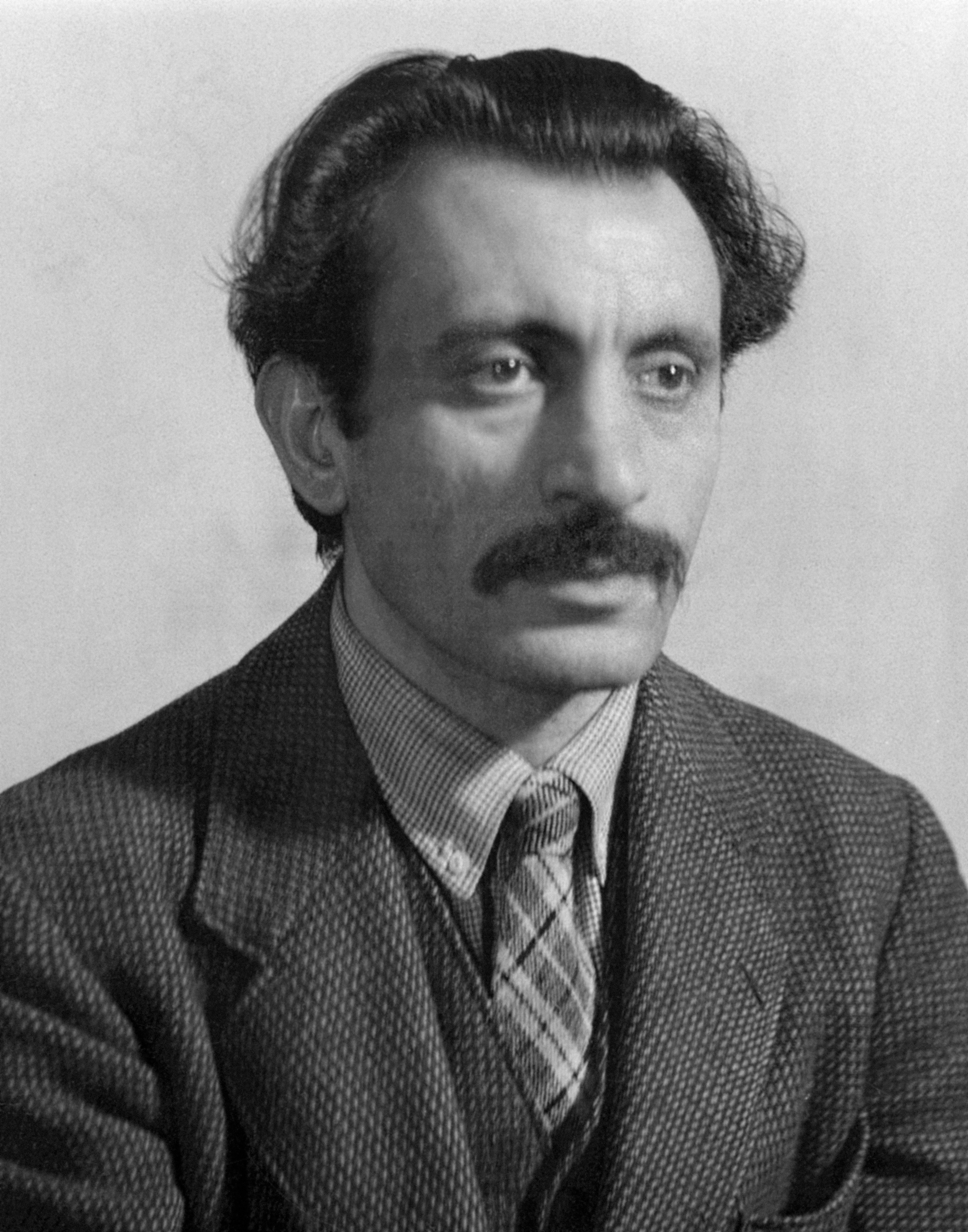

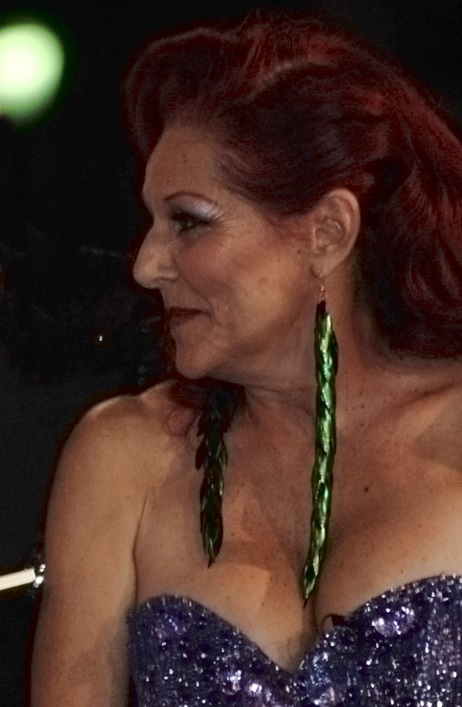

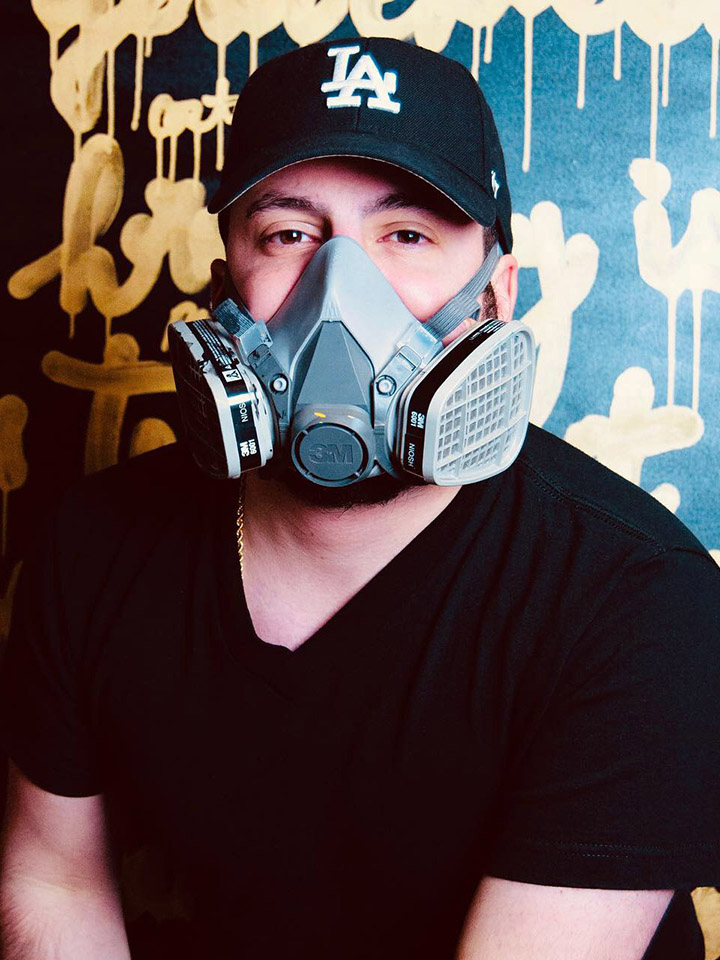

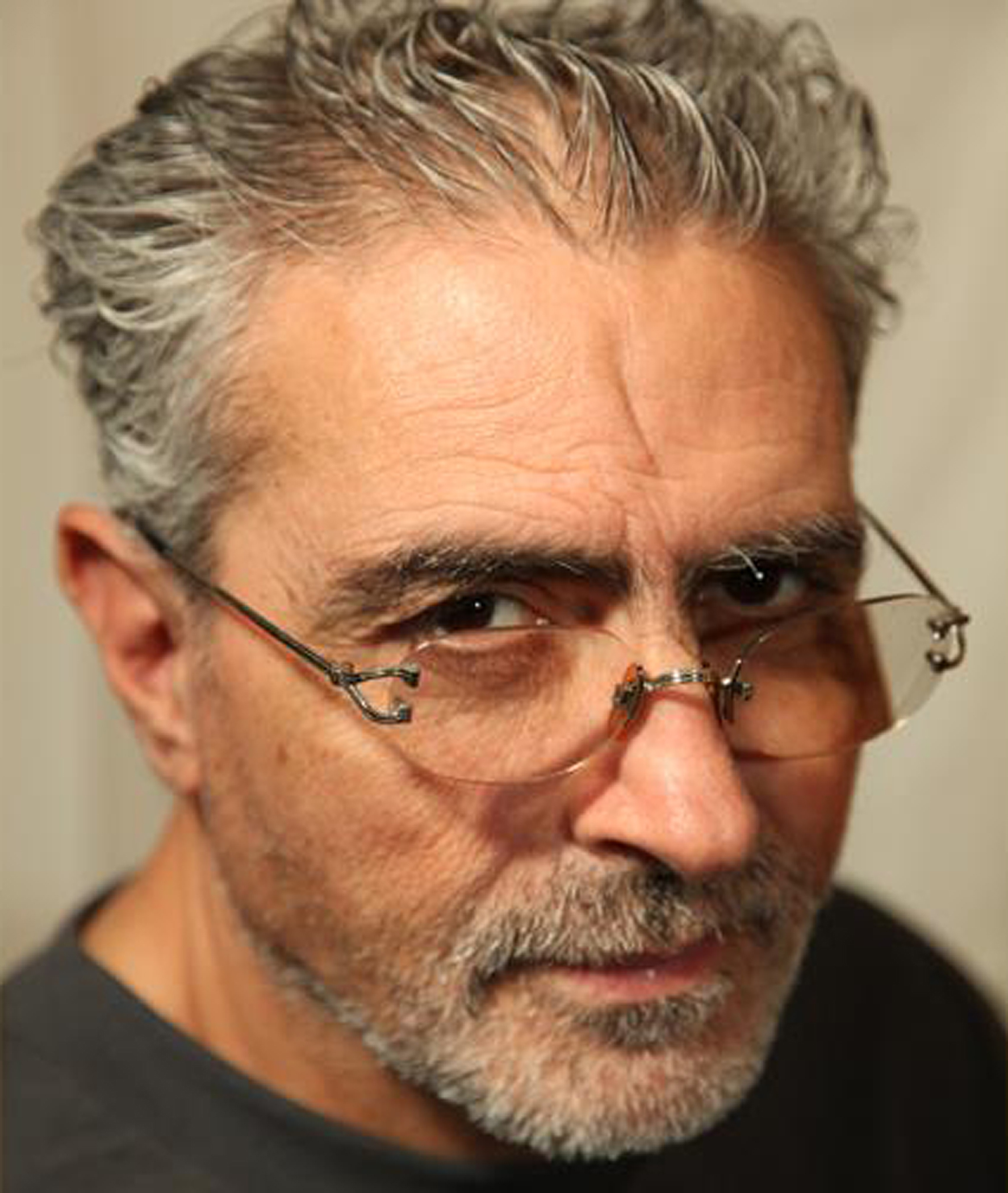

== Architects ==
- Mihran Mesrobian, architect
- Michel Mossessian, architect

== Banking and finance ==
- Charles A. Agemian, investment banker
- Granger K. Costikyan, investment banker at Brown Brothers Harriman
- Richard Donchian, financial analyst
- Paul Kazarian, investor

== Business ==
- Sarkis Acopian, founded the Acopian Technical Company
- Noubar Afeyan, co-founder of Moderna
- Garo H. Armen, CEO of Antigenics Inc.
- Greg Asbed, founder of Coalition of Immokalee Workers, worker-driven social responsibility model, and recipient of MacArthur “Genius Grant.”
- Augustus Barber, founder of Barber Foods
- John Berberian, entrepreneur
- Ian Bremmer, President and founder of Eurasia Group
- Charles Bilezikian, co-founder of Christmas Tree Shops
- Paul Bilzerian, Armenian-American businessman convicted of securities fraud
- Gerard Cafesjian, entrepreneur
- Vahan Chamlian, entrepreneur
- Larry Gagosian, art dealer, and founder of Gagosian Gallery with 16 locations internationally
- Paul Garmirian, founder of PG cigars
- Arthur T. Gregorian, noted oriental rug merchant and author
- Mark Hoplamazian, CEO and President of Global Hyatt
- Razmig Hovaghimian, co-founder and CEO of Viki
- Jirair Hovnanian, entrepreneur
- Kevork Hovnanian, founder of Hovnanian Enterprises
- Ronald Hovsepian, CEO of IntraLinks and Novell
- Steven A. Kandarian, former President, Chairman, and CEO, MetLife
- Arshag Karagheusian, co-founder of A & M Karagheusian
- Anna Kazanjian Longobardo, business executive and engineer
- Kirk Kerkorian, entrepreneur, casino mogul, considered to be one of the "founding fathers" of Las Vegas
- Blake Krikorian, co-founder of Sling Media
- Alex Manoogian, founder of Masco Corporation
- John Matoian, president of FOX and HBO
- David G. Mugar, entrepreneur and philanthropist
- Stephen P. Mugar, founder of Star Market and philanthropist
- Edward Nalbandian, entrepreneur
- Peter Najarian, options trader, television personality, market analyst
- Alexis Ohanian, Internet entrepreneur, activist and investor
- Charlie Papazian, founded the Association of Brewers
- Tro Piliguian, Chairman of Ogilvy & Mather
- Henry D. Sahakian, founder and owner of Uni-Mart
- Alex Seropian, founder of Bungie
- David Shakarian, founder of GNC
- John Vartan, entrepreneur and philanthropist
- Alex Yemenidjian, former CEO and Chairman of MGM Studios
- Craigie Zildjian, CEO of Zildjian
- Robert Zildjian, founder of Sabian Cymbals
Armenian Americans in business

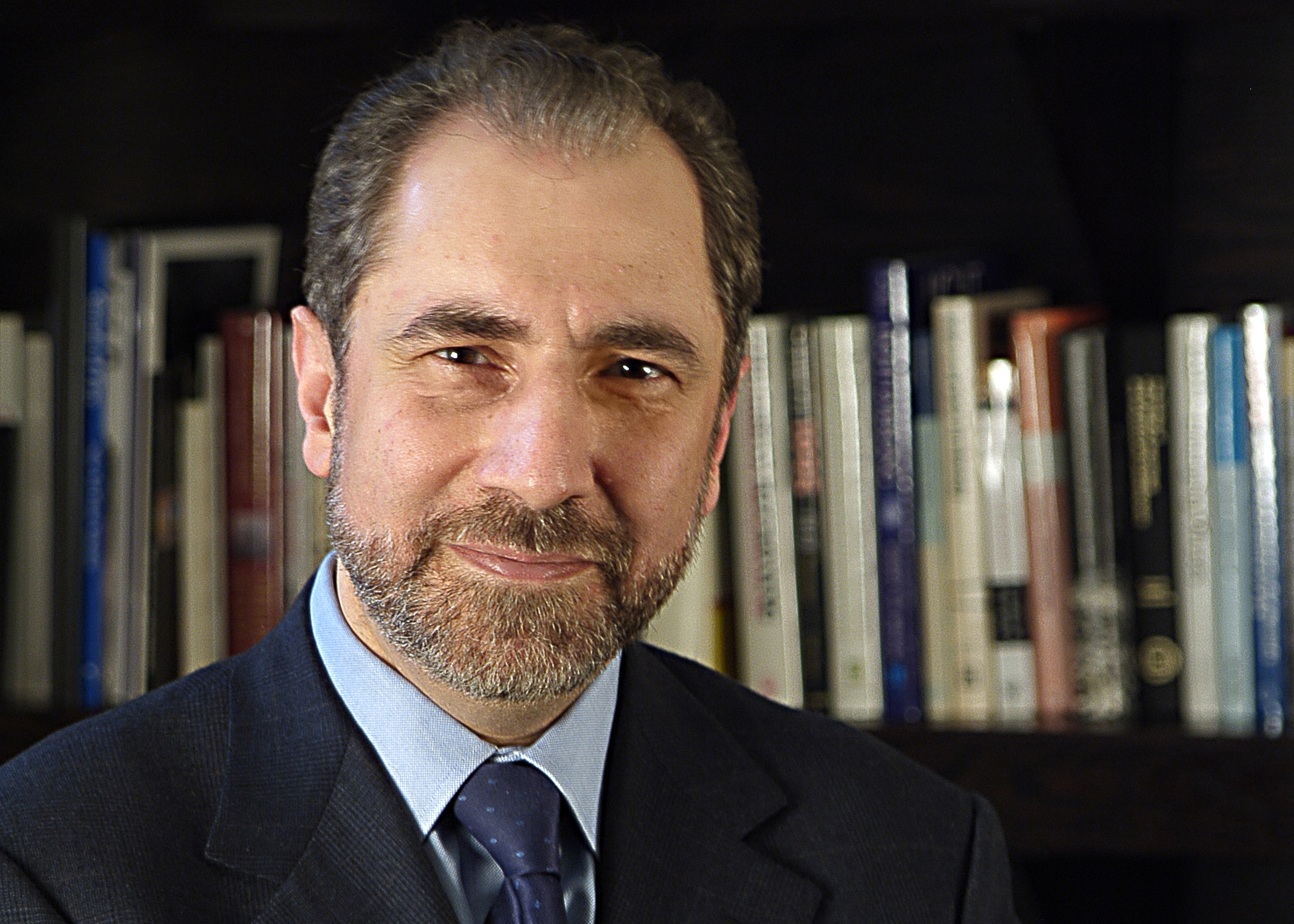

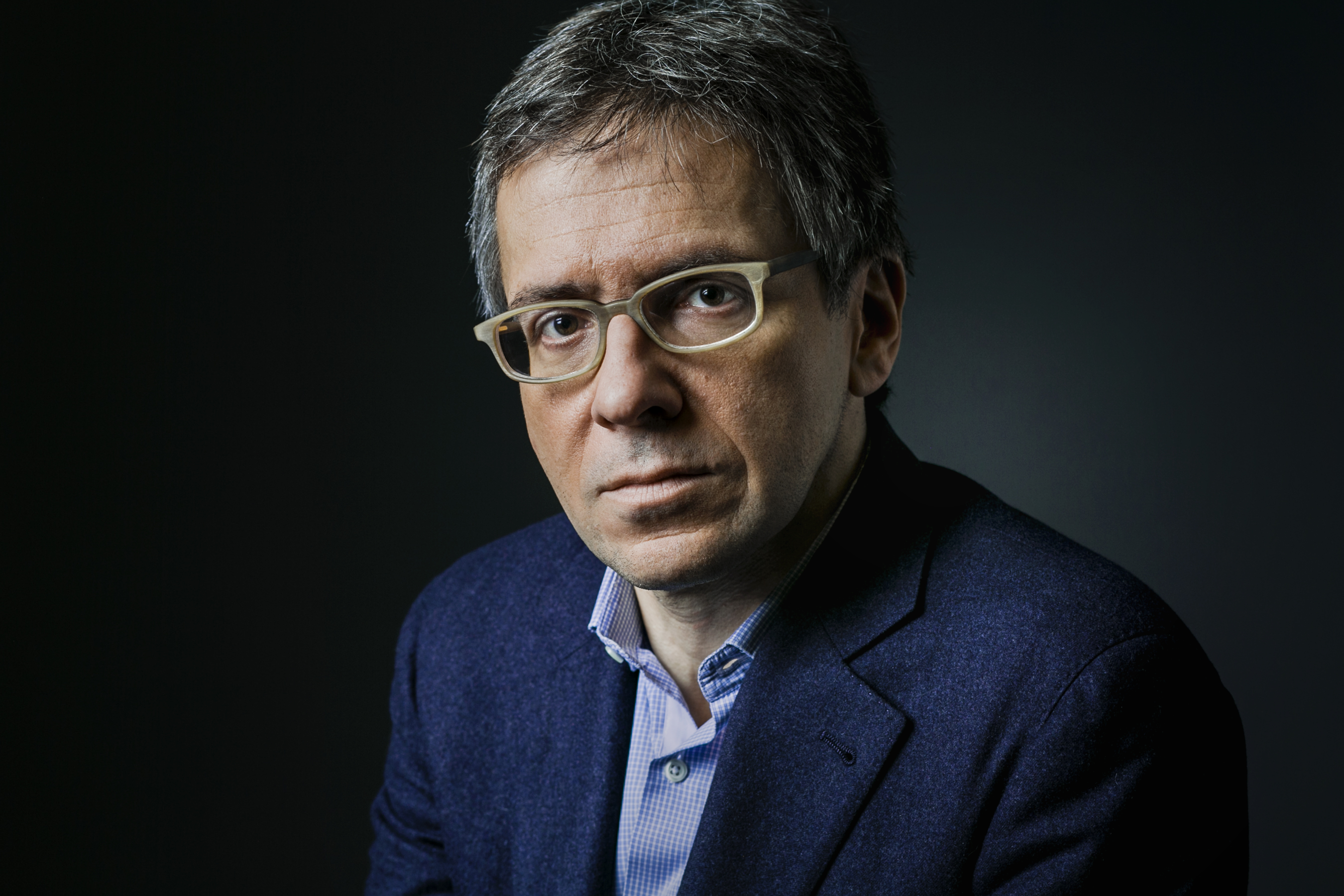

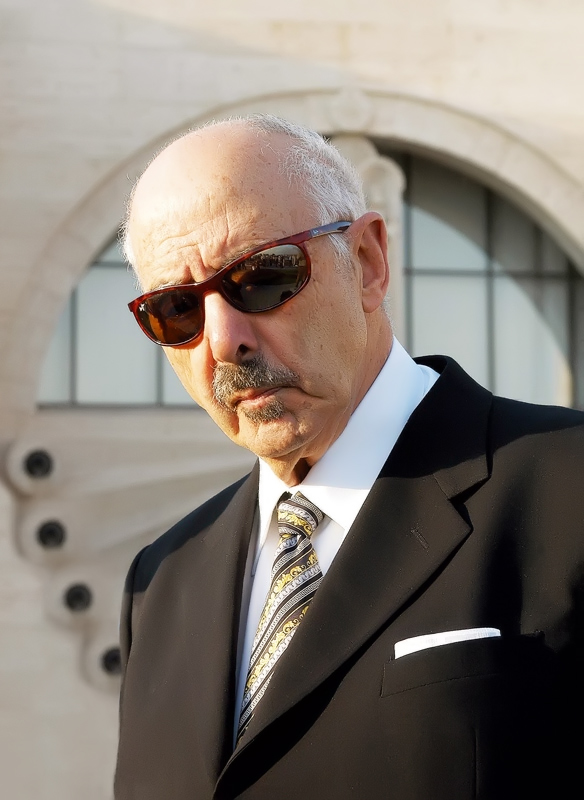

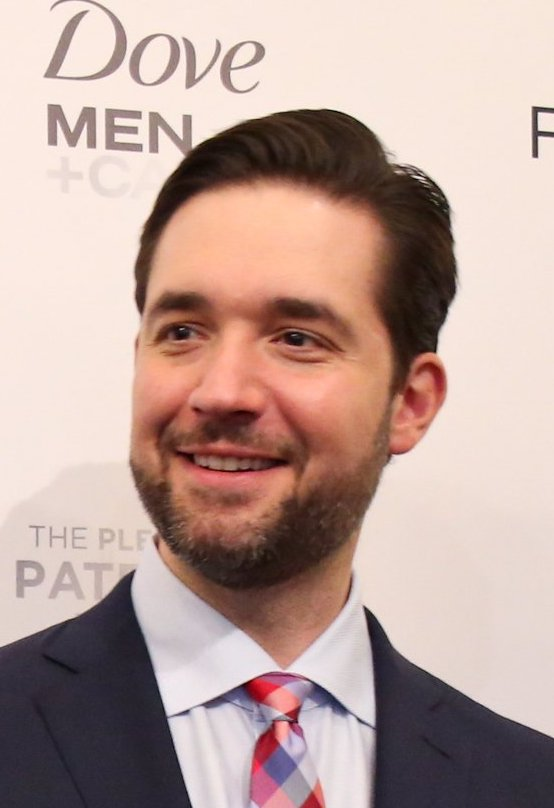

== Families ==
- The Mugar family, of Greater Boston, business and philanthropy
- The Kardashian family of Los Angeles, entertainment and business

== Filmmakers and animators ==
- Lisa Rose Apramian, screenwriter
- Samuel Aroutiounian, talent agent, film producer
- Aram Avakian, director, editor
- Ross Bagdasarian, Jr., film producer, record producer
- Ross Bagdasarian, Sr., pianist, singer-songwriter, actor (aka David Seville)
- Steve Dildarian, animator, creator of The Life and Times of Tim
- Atom Egoyan, director, screenwriter, producter
- Carla Garapedian, filmmaker
- Hughes Brothers, directors
- Howard Kazanjian, producer
- Alek Keshishian, director
- Rouben Mamoulian, director
- Haig P. Manoogian, film producer, professor of film at New York University, major early influence for many filmmakers such as Martin Scorsese
- Mardik Martin, screenwriter
- Levon Mkrtchyan, director
- Tony Petrossian, director
- Deran Sarafian, television director
- Katherine Sarafian, assistant film producer
- Richard C. Sarafian, television and film director
- Tanya Seghatchian, film producer
- Madeline Sharafian, Pixar director and story artist
- Michael Vartan, film and television actor
- Francis Veber, screenwriter
- Steven Zaillian, writer and director
- Eric Esrailian, producer
- Sev Ohanian, film producer and screenwriter
- Natalie Qasabian, film producer

== Journalism ==
- Michael J. Arlen, staff writer for The New Yorker
- Ben Bagdikian, former editor-in-chief of The Washington Post
- David Barsamian, radio broadcaster and journalist
- Ken Dilanian, justice and intelligence correspondent for NBC News
- Sergey Dovlatov, columnist, contributed to The New Yorker
- John Garabedian, radio personality, host of Open House Party
- David Ignatius, associated editor of The Washington Post
- Ana Kasparian, co-host of The Young Turks talk show
- Armen Keteyian, chief investigative correspondent for CBS News
- Bob Kevoian, nationally syndicated morning radio talk show host
- Nicholas Kristof, correspondent for The New York Times
- Tim Kurkjian, reporter at ESPN
- Vago Muradian, former editor for Defense News correspondent for Defense & Aerospace Report
- Michael Najarian, host of nationally syndicated Venus/Mars Radio Show
- Strawberry Saroyan, journalist, The New York Times
- Lara Setrakian, journalist and political analyst, Bloomberg Television and ABC News
- Janet Shamlian, news correspondent for NBC News
- Roger Tatarian, senior VP of United Press International
- Philip Terzian, literary editor of The Weekly Standard
- Scout Tufankjian, photojournalist
- Matt Vasgersian, sportscaster and host

== Law ==
- Samuel Der-Yeghiayan, former United States federal judge for the Northern District of Illinois
- Mitchell Garabedian, lawyer known for representing sexual abuse victims in the Boston area during the Catholic priest sexual abuse scandal
- Charles R. Garry, civil rights/criminal defense attorney
- Mark Geragos, defense attorney
- Robert Kardashian, defense attorney
- Marsha Kazarosian, attorney handling high-profile cases
- Garo Mardirossian, plaintiff attorney involved in civil rights, product liability, and personal injury cases
- John Nalbandian, United States Federal judge for the United States Court of Appeals for the Sixth Circuit
- Bill Paparian, criminal defense attorney
- Robert Philibosian, 38th District Attorney of Los Angeles County
- Dickran Tevrizian, United States federal judge for the Central District of California

== Military ==
- Anna Der-Vartanian, Master Chief Petty Officer in the U.S. Navy
- Ernest H. Dervishian, U.S. Army soldier and a recipient of the United States military's highest decoration, the Medal of Honor, for his actions in World War II
- Khachadour Paul Garabedian, U.S. Navy officer during the Civil War
- Sam K. Harrison, corporal during World War II
- Jeffrey L. Harrigian, served as the commander of United States Air Forces in Europe and Air Forces Africa
- Paul Robert Ignatius, served the Navy and became Assistant Secretary of Defense under President Lyndon Johnson
- Sue Sarafian Jehl, member of the Women's Auxiliary Army Corps (WAAC) personnel who served in World War II
- George Juskalian, U.S. Army Colonel who served World War II, Vietnam War, and the Korean War
- Harry Kizirian, Marine Corps during World War II and most decorated serviceman of Rhode Island
- John Kizirian, Army member during World War II, Korean War, Vietnam War and believed one of the most decorated Armenian Americans ever to serve the United States
- Victor Maghakian, Marine Corps during World War II and is considered one of the most decorated American soldiers of the war
- Monte Melkonian, military commander during the First Nagorno-Karabakh War
- Stephen J. Maranian, U.S. Army Major General who served from 1988 to 2023 and is the highest ranking Armenian American to serve in the U.S. Army

== Music ==
- KÁRYYN, composer, electronic musician
- Dennis Agajanian, singer
- Anahid Ajemian, violinist
- Maro Ajemian, pianist
- Elijah Blue Allman, musician (son of actress/singer Cher)
- Roupen Altiparmakian, musician
- Lucine Amara, soprano
- Charles Amirkhanian, composer
- Kay Armen, singer-songwriter
- Şahan Arzruni, classical pianist
- George Avakian, Columbia Records executive
- Ara Babajian, drummer
- Eve Beglarian, composer
- Ara Berberian, operatic singer
- Cathy Berberian, composer, singer
- John Berberian, oud player and rock/jazz fusion musician
- Duane Betts, singer-songwriter and guitarist
- John Bilezikjian, oud player, multi-instrumentalist, composer, singer
- Armen Boladian, record producer, founder of Westbound Records and Sound of Gospel
- Armen Chakmakian, recording artist, keyboardist, composer
- Cher (Cherilyn Sarkisian), singer and actress
- Lili Chookasian, contralto
- Angel Deradoorian, bassist
- Ara Dinkjian, oud player
- Armen Donelian, musician
- Kallen Esperian, opera singer
- Gegham Grigoryan, opera artist
- Asmik Grigorian, opera artist
- Ivan Galamian, violin teacher
- Michael Gulezian, musician
- Richard Hagopian, oud player
- Sib Hashian, drummer
- Alan Hovhaness, classical composer
- Alexis Wilkins, country singer
- Greg Jehanian, bassist and backing vocalist, member of indie rock band mewithoutYou
- Tonio K, composer
- Tamar Kaprelian, singer
- Kim Kashkashian, violinist
- Art Laboe, disc jockey, songwriter, record producer
- Ana Lenchantin, musician/actress
- Paz Lenchantin, rock musician
- Jeff Manookian, composer of Symphony of Tears commemorating the Armenian Genocide, conductor, pianist, music teacher
- Edward Manukyan, composer
- Haig Mardirosian, organist, conductor, composer
- Paul Motian, jazz musician
- Jerry Murad, musician
- Vazgen Muradian, composer and violinist
- Armen Nalbandian, jazz musician
- Bruce Nazarian, musician, songwriter, and record producer
- Michael Omartian, music producer
- Constantine Orbelian, conductor and pianist
- Konstantin Orbelyan, pianist, composer, head of the State Estrada Orchestra of Armenia
- Zabelle Panosian, singer
- Harout Pamboukjian, pop singer
- Leon Redbone, jazz and blues artist
- Karnig Sarkissian, singer
- System of a Down members:
  - John Dolmayan, drummer
  - Ontronik Khachaturian, former drummer
  - Daron Malakian, guitarist and vocalist
  - Shavo Odadjian, bassist
  - Serj Tankian, lead vocalist, keyboards, rhythm guitar
- Derek Sherinian, keyboardist
- Barry Tashian, guitarist, songwriter
- Gracie Terzian, singer-songwriter and jazz ukulele player
- Armand Tokatyan, opera singer
- Arto Tunçboyacıyan, multi-instrumentalist and vocalist
- Onno Tunç, composer and arranger
- Turk Van Lake, composer, arranger, and jazz guitarist
- Sylvie Vartan, singer
- Richard Yardumian, classical composer
Armenian Americans in music

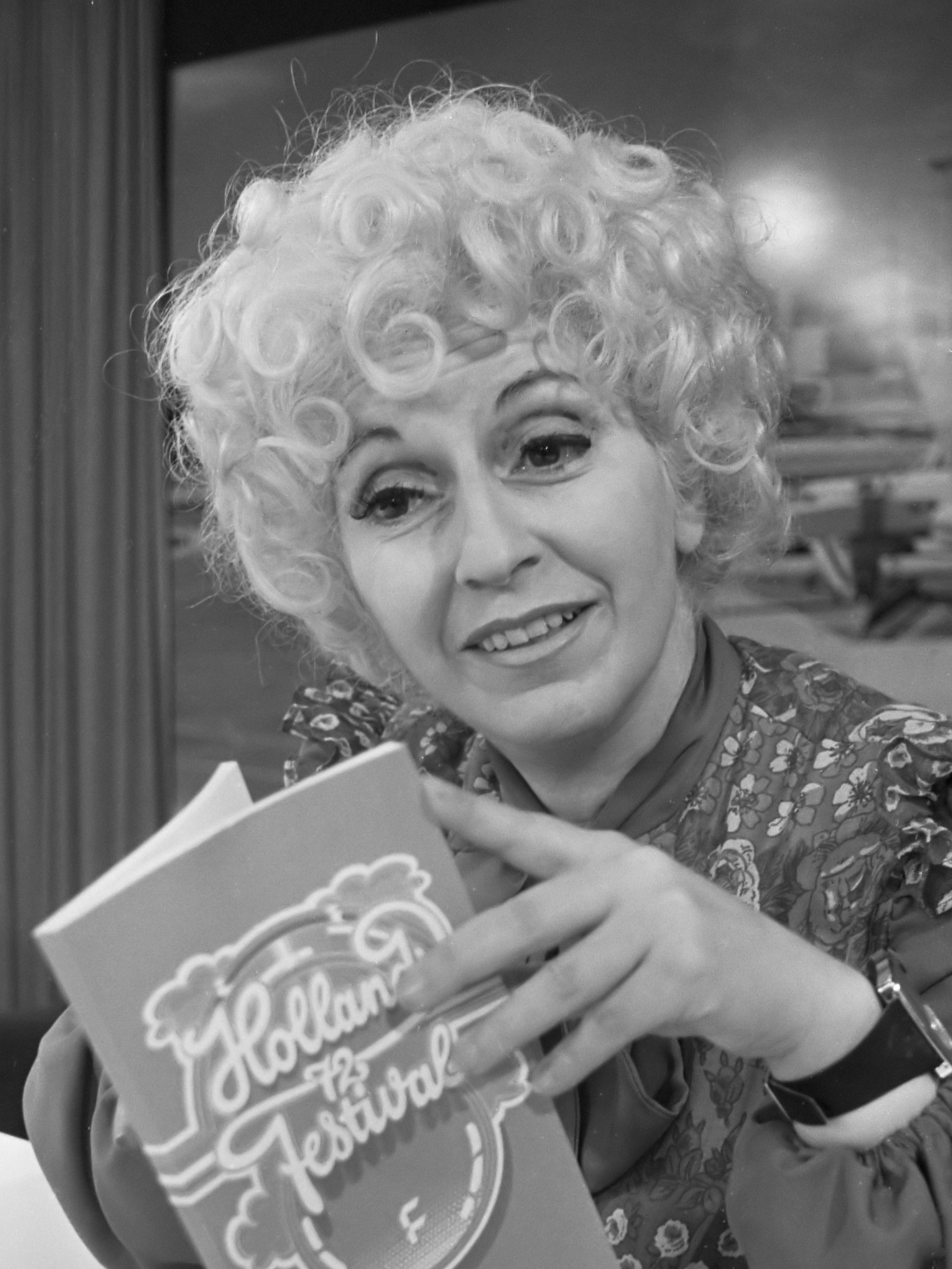

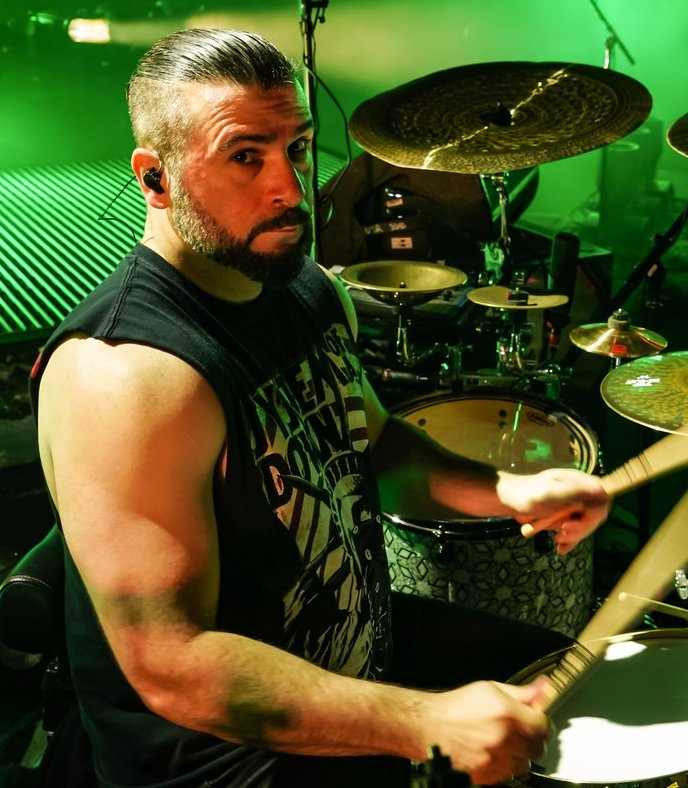

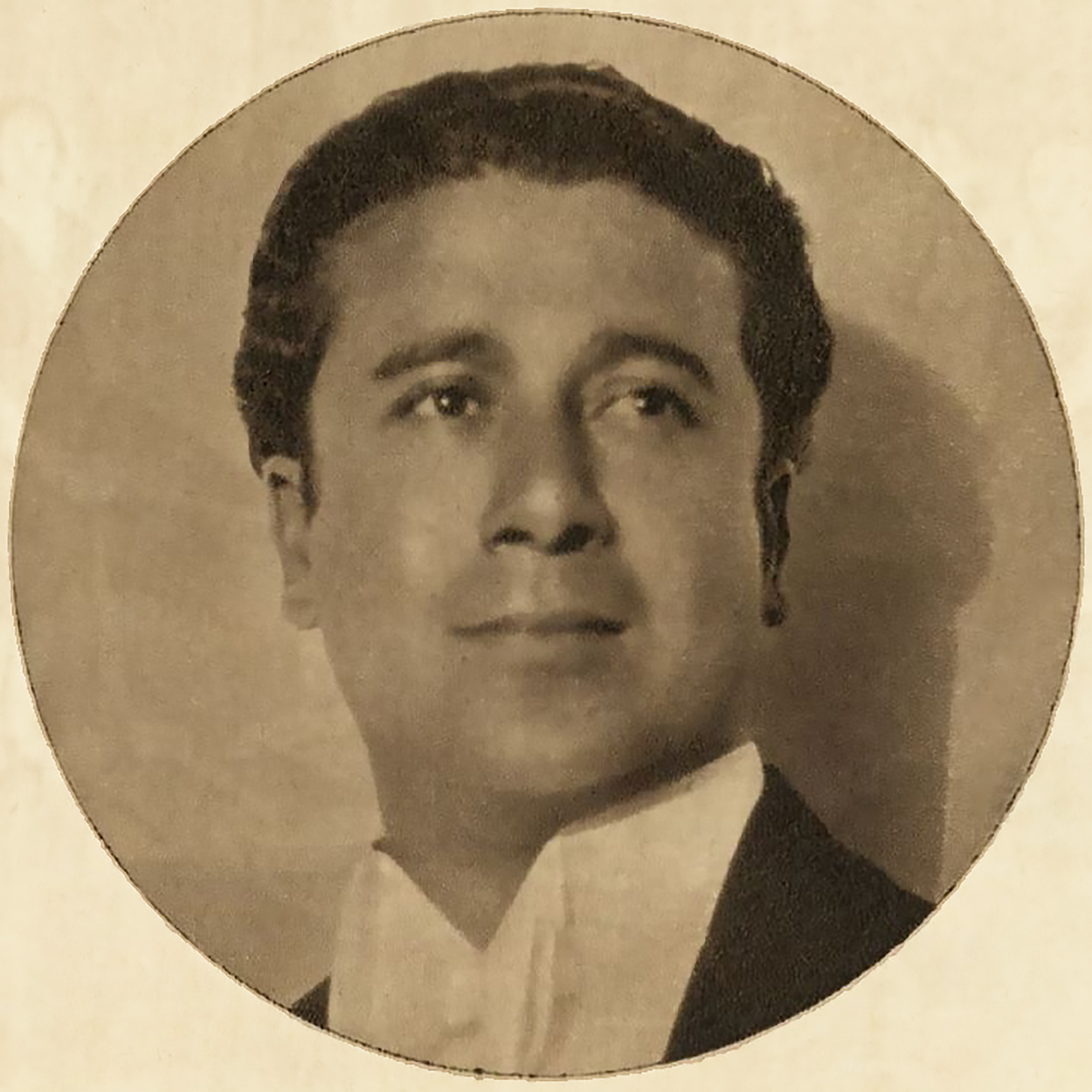

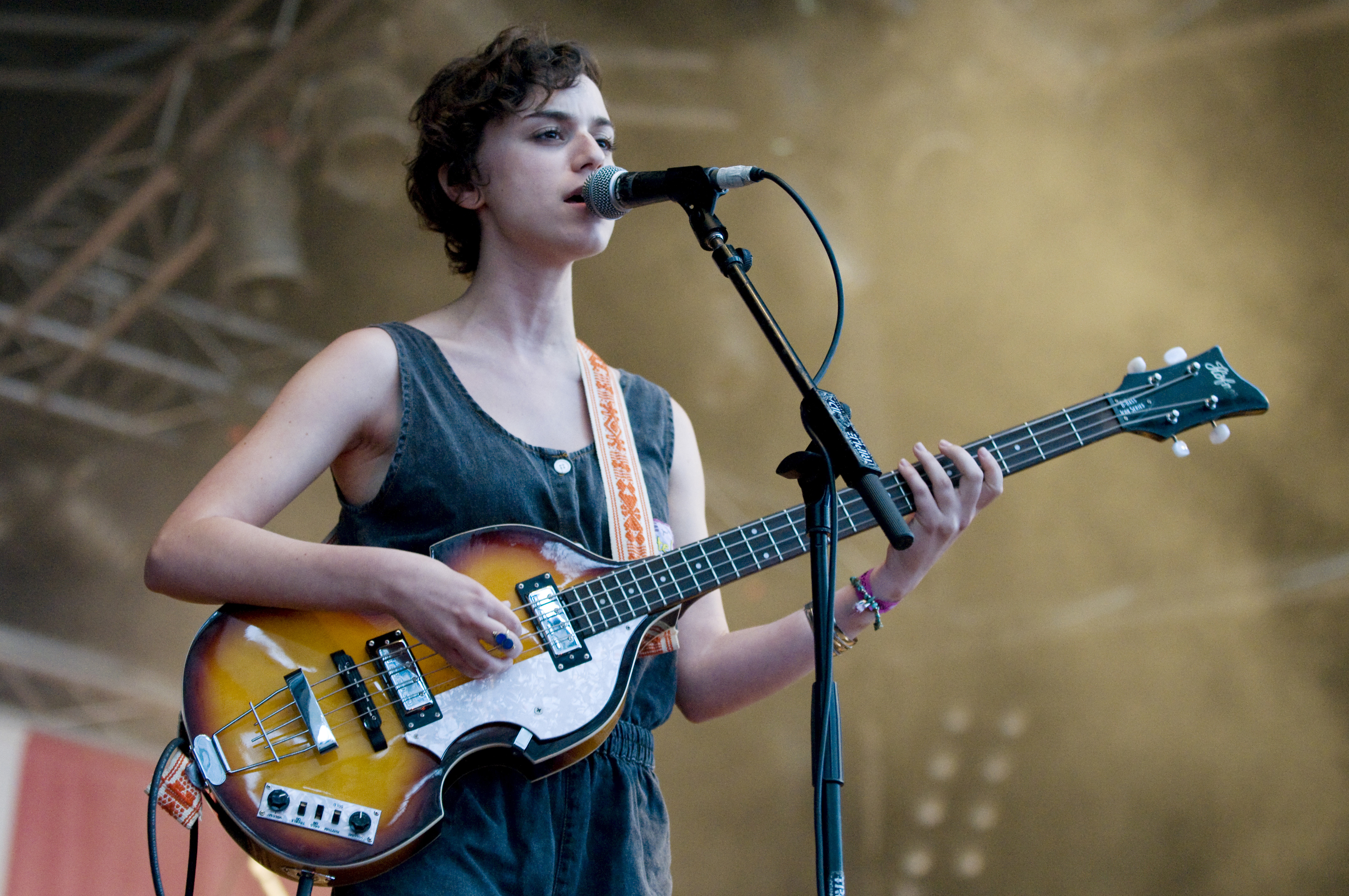

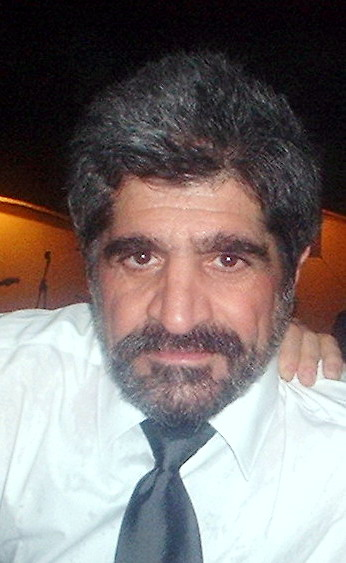

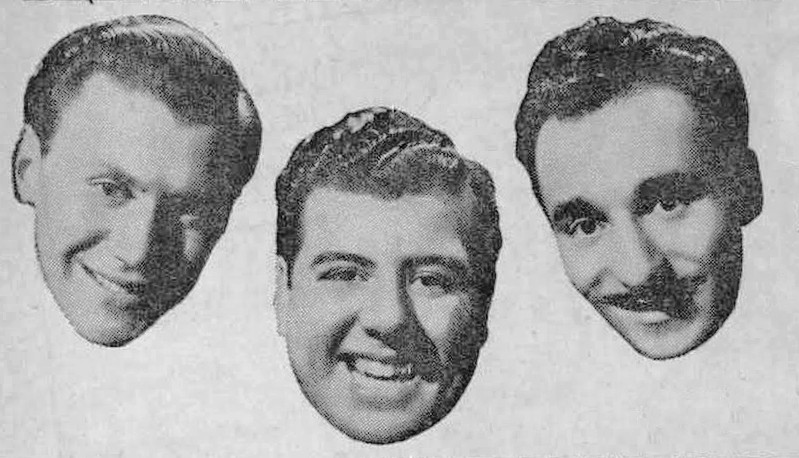

== Religion ==
- Torkom Manoogian, archbishop
- Rousas John Rushdoony, Christian reconstructionist theologian and philosopher, founder of The Chalcedon Foundation
- Roger Youderian, missionary

== Sciences ==
- Sarkis Acopian, inventor of the solar-powered radio
- George Adomian, mathematician
- George Aghajanian, professor of psychiatry, a pioneer in the area of neuropharmacology
- Hagop S. Akiskal, clinical psychiatrist, best known for his pioneering research on bipolar disorder
- Armen Alchian, economist
- James P. Bagian, astronaut
- Harry Daghlian, physicist with the Manhattan Project
- Raymond V. Damadian, inventor of MRI
- Moses Housepian, physician and humanitarian aid worker
- Albert Kapikian, virologist and pioneer in vaccine development for rotavirus
- Varaztad Hovhannes Kazanjian, founder of the modern practice of plastic surgery
- Hampar Kelikian, orthopedic-surgeon pioneer
- Edward Keonjian, the father of microelectronics; designer of the world's first solar-powered, pocket-sized radio transmitter
- Jack Kevorkian, pathologist
- Leonid Khachiyan, mathematician
- Edward Khantzian, early pioneer in the psychological understanding of addictions
- John Najarian, transplant surgeon pioneer
- Robert Nalbandyan, chemist
- Claire Panosian, infectious disease specialist and science writer
- Hagop Panossian, aerospace engineer, academic and philanthropist
- Christopher A. Sarkiss, neurosurgeon
- Alex Sevanian, molecular pharmacologist, pioneer in free radical research
- Luther George Simjian, inventor
- Sarkes Tarzian, engineer, inventor, and broadcaster
- Avie Tevanian, operating systems researcher
Armenian Americans in sciences

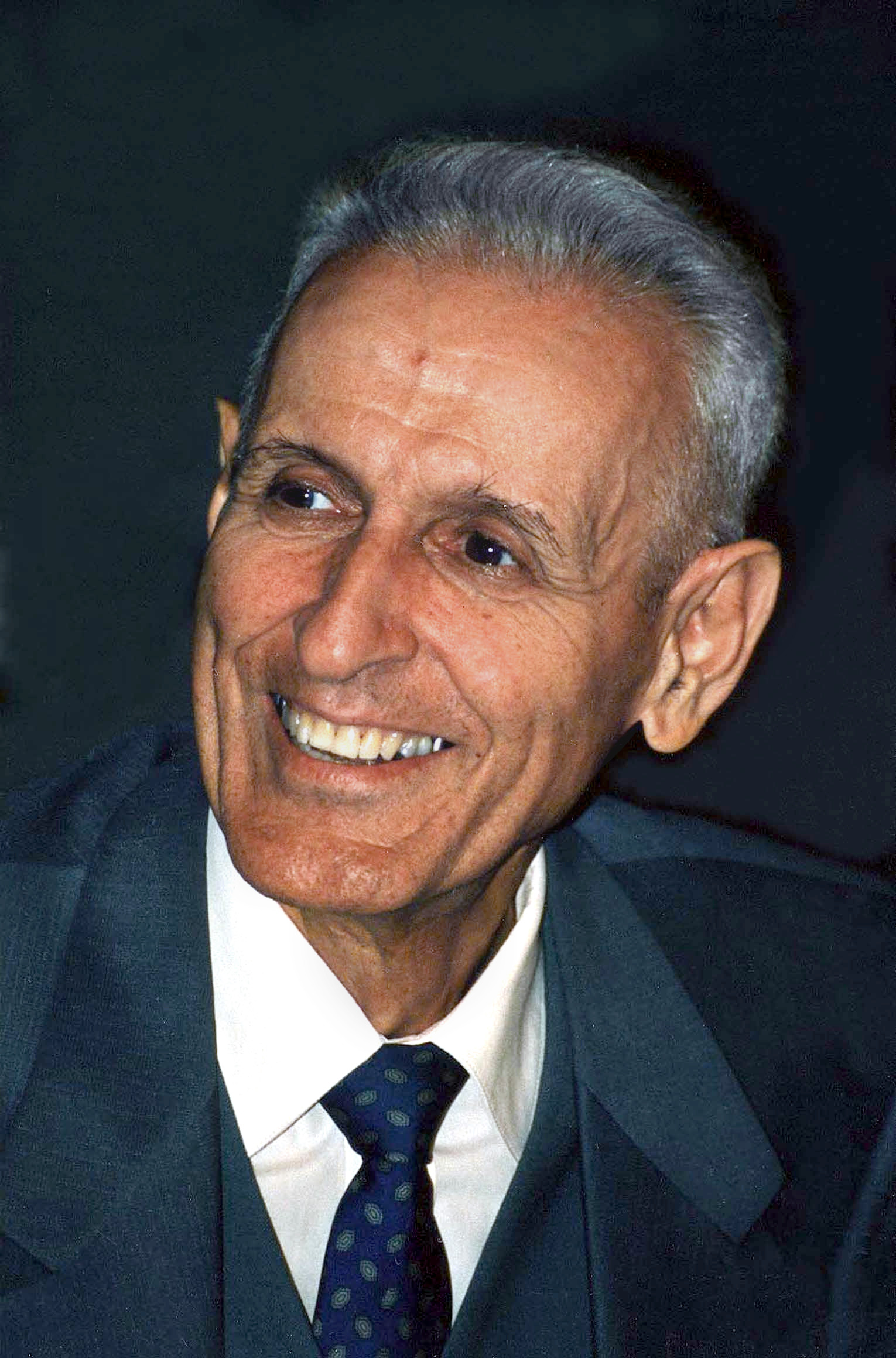

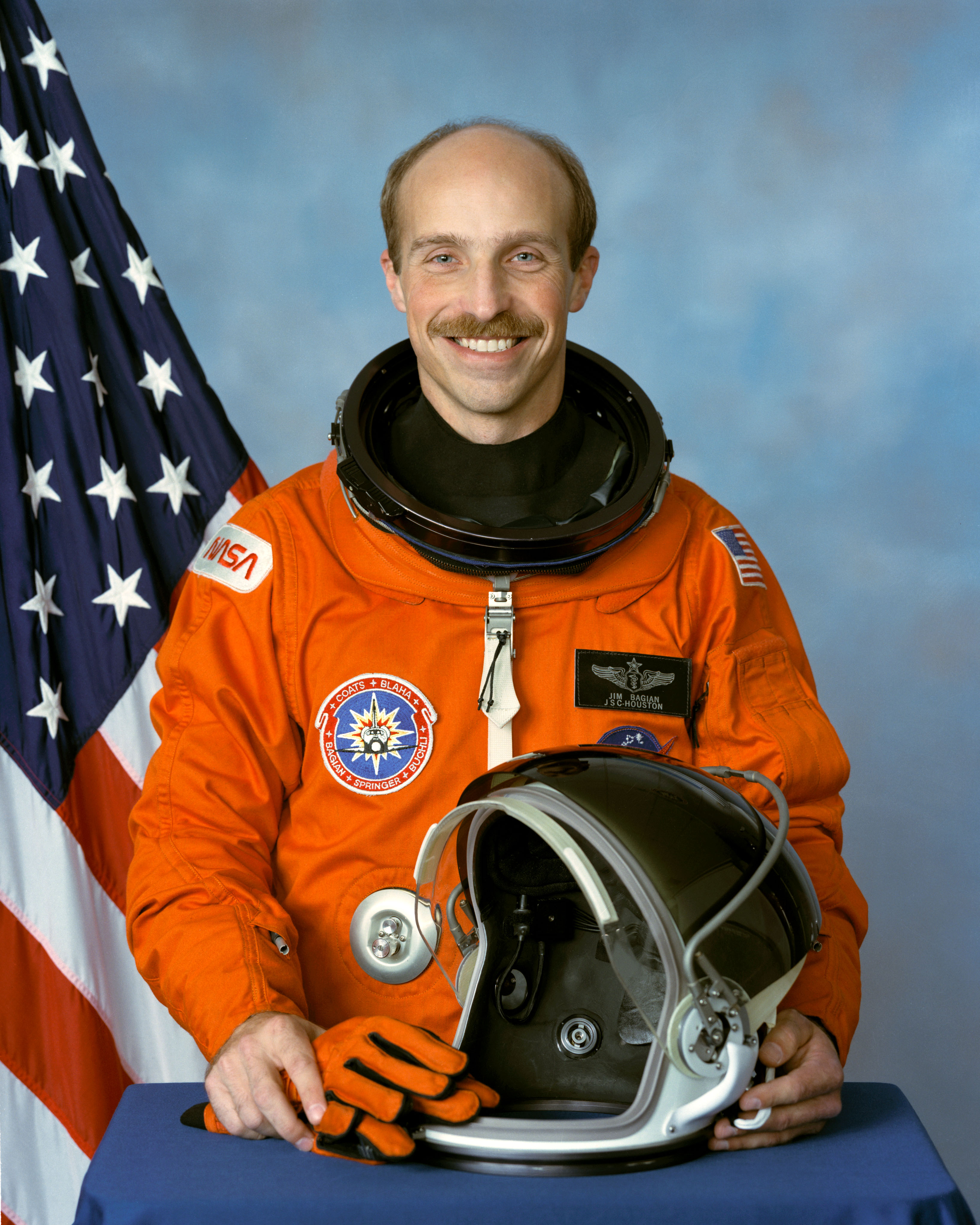

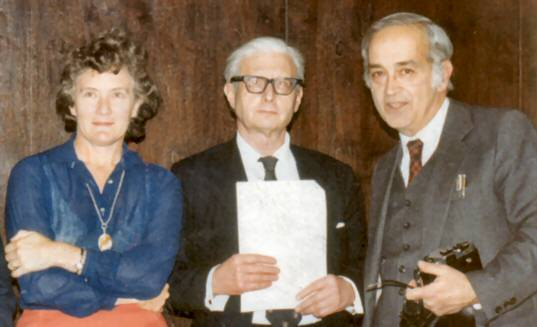

== Sports ==
- Tatev Abrahamyan, chess player
  Armenian Americans in sports
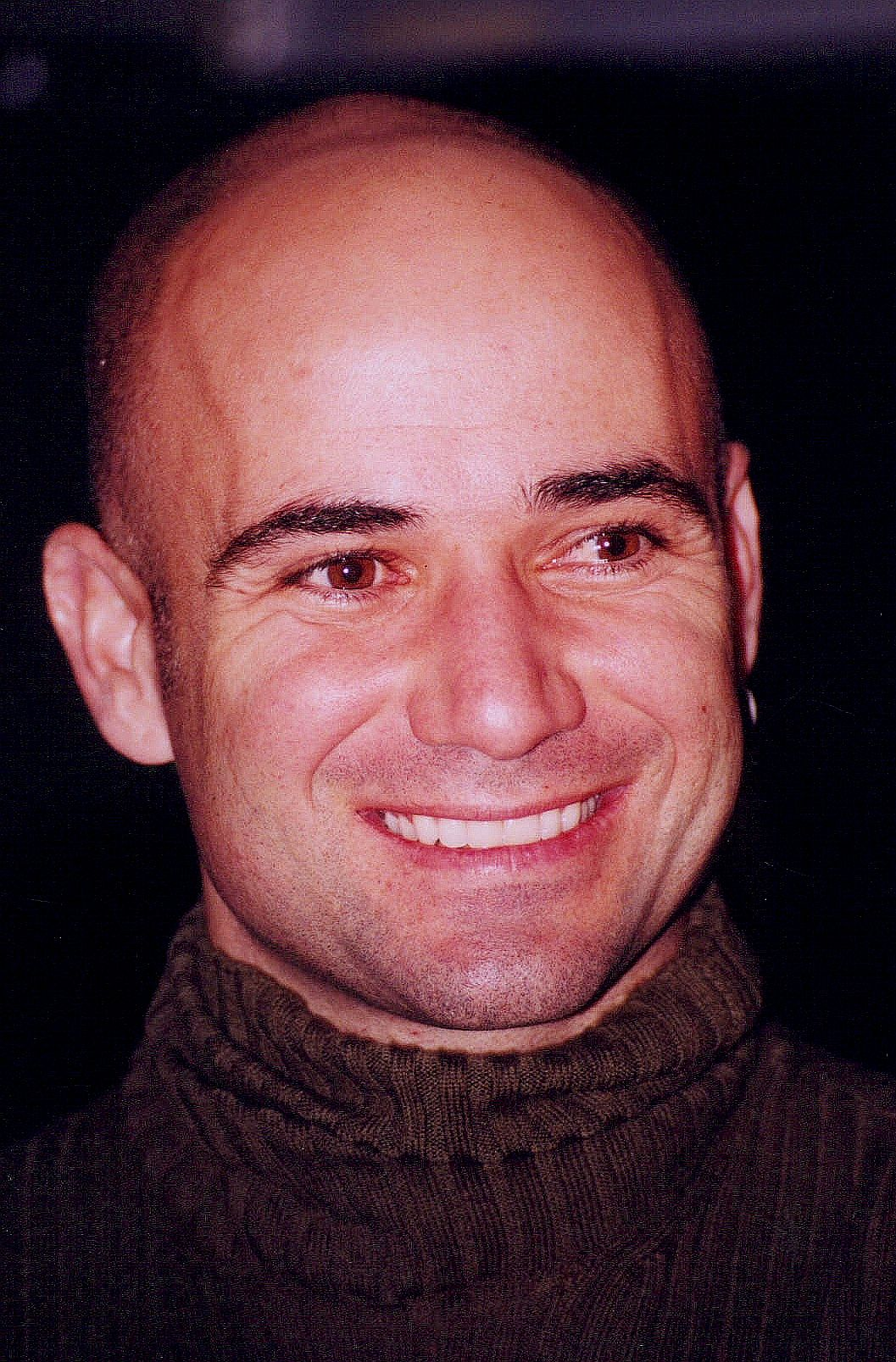
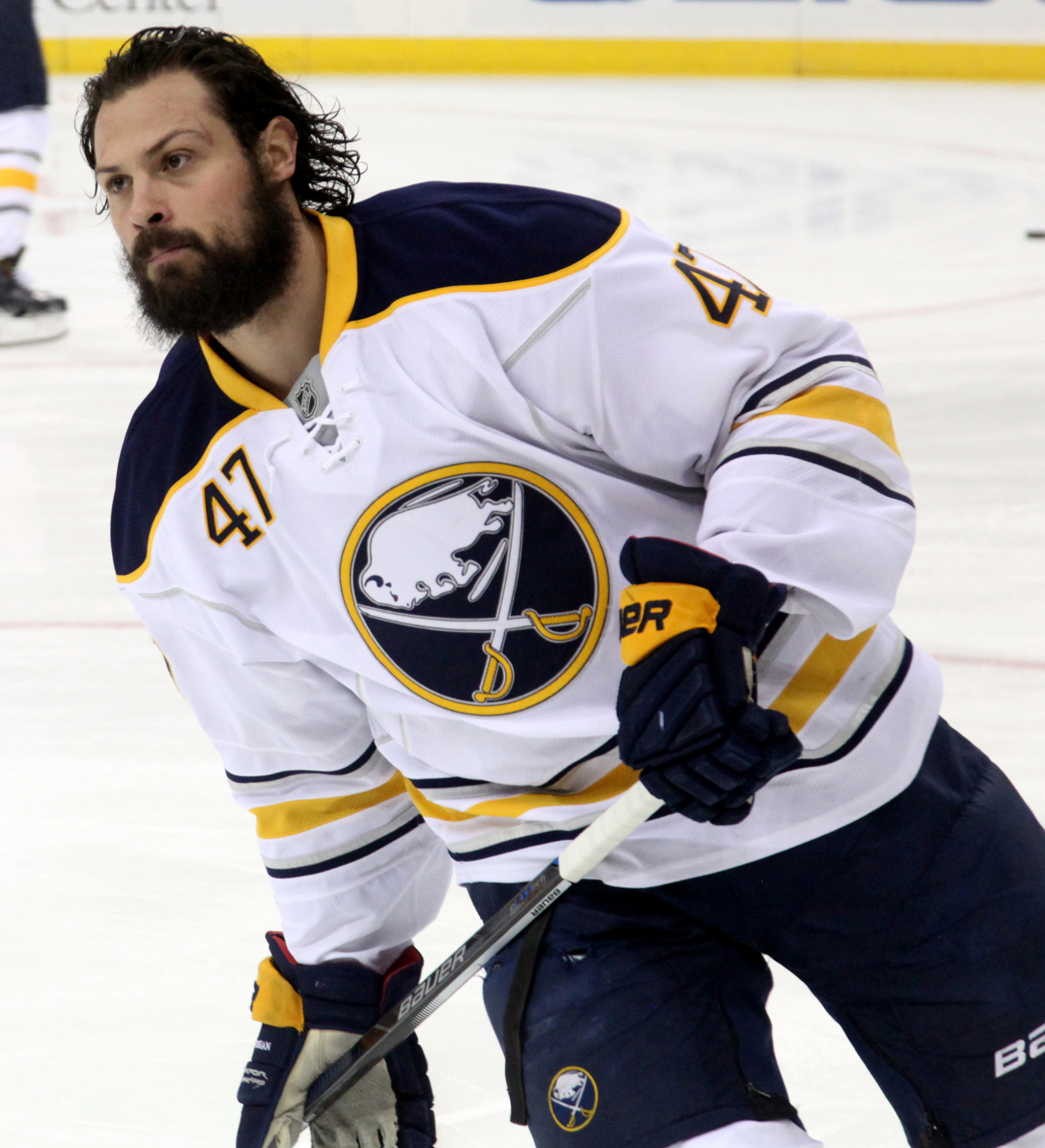
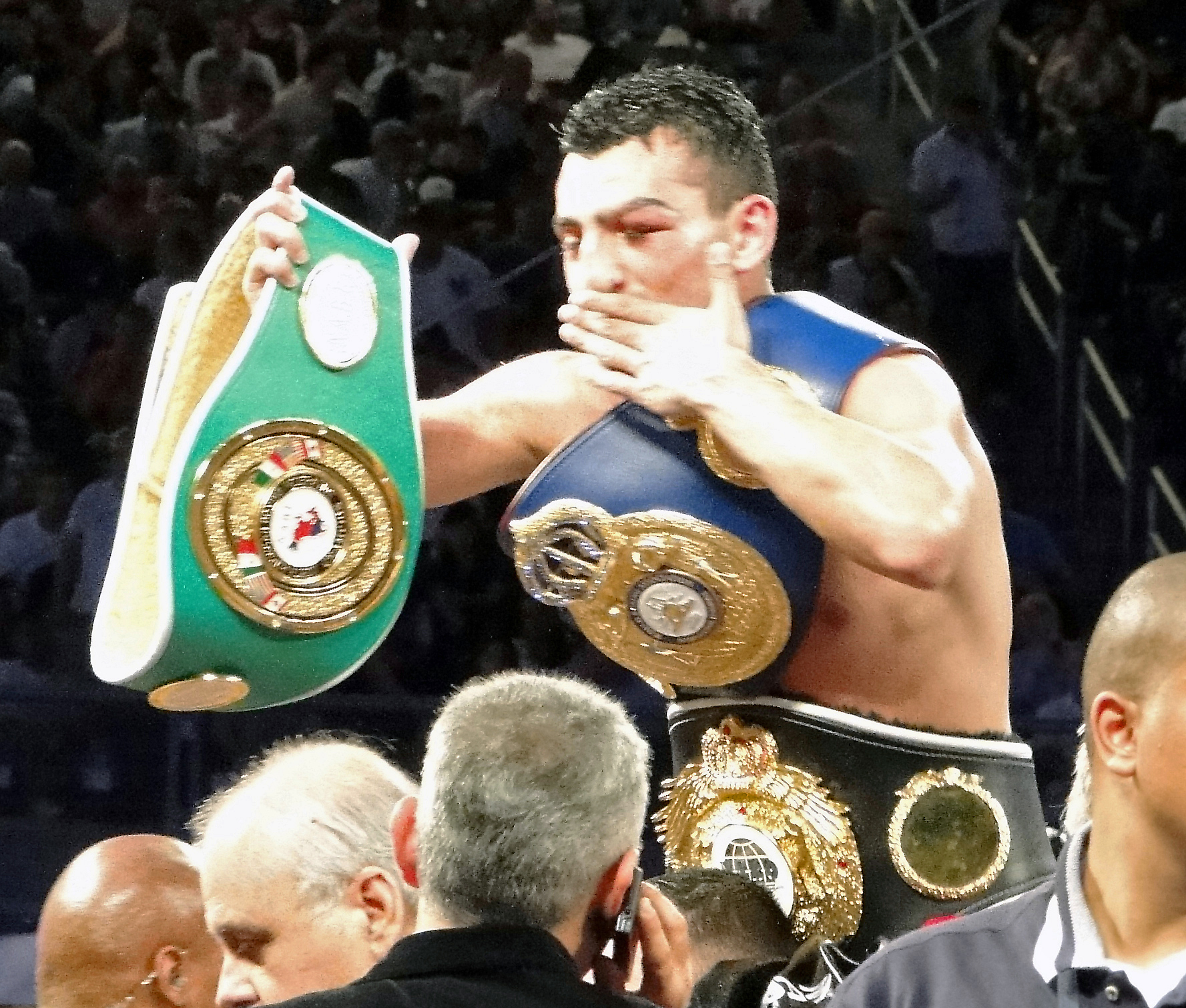
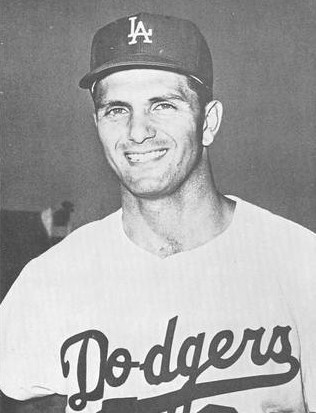
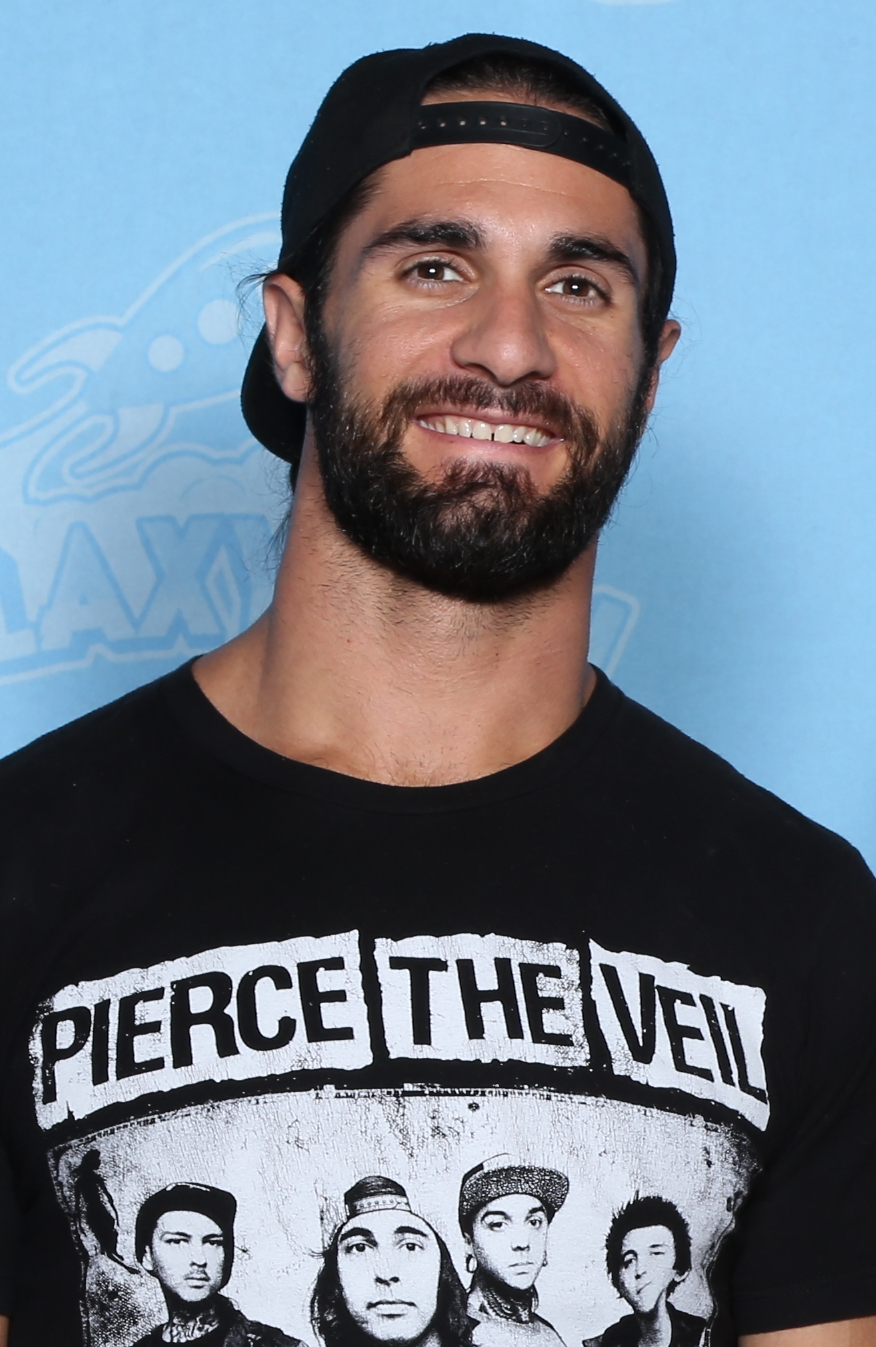
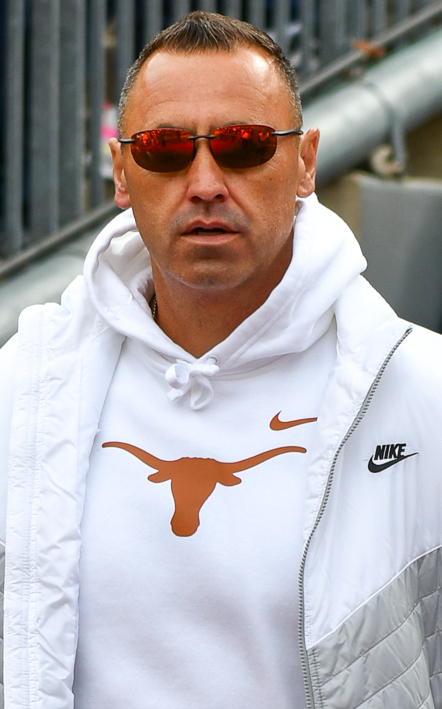
- Fred Agabashian, professional racer
- Ben Agajanian, professional football player
- Christopher J.C. Agajanian, motorsports promoter
- Andre Agassi, professional tennis player
- Emmanuel Agassi, former Olympic boxer and coach
- Andy Bakjian, Hall of Fame track and field official and author on the subject
- Cam Bedrosian, MLB pitcher; his father is Steve Bedrosian
- Steve Bedrosian, 1987 Cy Young Award winner for the Philadelphia Phillies
- Zach Bogosian, professional ice hockey player
- Gokor Chivichyan, judoka, grappler and trainer
- Dave Coskunian, soccer player
- Vic Darchinyan, professional boxer
- Marcelo Djian, Brazilian professional soccer player
- Trent Edwards, professional football player
- Alecko Eskandarian, professional soccer player
- Andranik Eskandarian, soccer player
- Chuck Essegian, professional baseball player
- Manvel Gamburyan, mixed martial arts fighter
- Blackie Gejeian, race car driver and race car builder
- Brian Goorjian, coach of Sydney Kings
- Ed Goorjian, former coach of Loyola Marymount Lions men's basketball team
- Chris Hacopian, baseball player for Texas A&M drafted by the Washington Nationals in the 2026 Major League Baseball draft.
- Tim Kurkjian, sports analyst on ESPN
- Bobby Managoff (Robert Manoogian, Jr.), wrestler
- Harry T. Mangurian, Jr., former owner of the Boston Celtics and Memphis Rogues
- Pete Mangurian, offensive line coach of Tampa Bay Buccaneers
- Don Manoukian, professional football player for Oakland Raiders
- Vanes Martirosyan, professional boxer
- Gegard Mousasi, Dutch mixed martial artist and kickboxer
- Yura Movsisyan, MLS Champion with Real Salt Lake and Armenia National Football Team player
- Karo Parisyan, mixed martial arts fighter
- Ara Parseghian, Notre Dame head football coach
- Seth Rollins, professional wrestler
- Steve Sarkisian, University of Texas head football coach
- Austin Seferian-Jenkins, NFL player
- Edmen Shahbazyan, mixed martial arts fighter
- Jerry Tarkanian, college basketball coach, known for his time at UNLV; member of the Naismith Memorial Basketball Hall of Fame
- Mark Vartanian, professional wrestler
- Garo Yepremian, professional football placekicker

== Writers, literature, playwrights ==
- Marie Rose Abousefian, writer, playwright and academic
- Michael Arlen, novelist
- Ben Bagdikian, political writer
- Peter Balakian, poet, writer and academic
- David Barsamian, radio broadcaster and writer
- A. I. Bezzerides, novelist
- Chris Bohjalian, novelist
- Gary Braver, fiction writer
- Michael Casey, poet
- Edward N. Costikyan, political writer
- Alicia Ghiragossian, writer, Nobel Prize nominee
- Aram Haigaz, writer
- Marjorie Housepian Dobkin (1922–2013), professor at Barnard College and author
- Nancy Kricorian, poet and author
- Oksana Marafioti, writer
- Pete Najarian, writer
- Arthur Nersesian, novelist, playwright and poet
- Peter Orullian, writer
- George Ouzounian, humorist
- Josh Pahigian, baseball writer and novelist
- Aram Saroyan, novelist
- William Saroyan, Pulitzer Prize-winning playwright and author
- George Stambolian, key figure in the early gay literary movement in New York
- Hrag Vartanian, columnist
- Thomas Woods, political writer and author
- Rob Yardumian. novelist

== See also ==
- Armenian diaspora
- Little Armenia, Los Angeles
- Armenian Assembly of America
- Armenian American Political Action Committee
- Armenian National Committee of America
- Armenian Youth Federation
- List of Armenians
- List of Armenian-Iranians
- List of French Armenians
- List of Canadian-Armenians
- List of Russian-Armenians
