= Najarian =

Najarian (Armenian: Նաջարյան) is an Armenian surname. Notable people with the surname include

- Ara Najarian (born 1959), American politician
- John Najarian (1927–2020), American surgeon
- Kayvan Najarian, Iranian scientist
- Michael Najarian (born 1952), American radio host
- Nazar Najarian, Lebanese politician of Armenian descent
- Peter Najarian (born 1963), American television personality
- Pete Najarian (writer) (born 1940), American writer
