= List of Armenian Canadians =

This is a list of notable Canadians of Armenian descent.

== Academics ==
- Adam Morton – philosopher

== Arts and media ==
- bbno$ pronounced "baby no money" born Alexander Leon Gumuchian – Canadian rapper, singer-songwriter of Armenian descent
- David Alpay – actor
- Ashot Ariyan – composer and pianist
- Raffi Armenian – conductor
- André Arthur – radio host and independent MP
- Araz Artinian – photographer, filmmaker and humanitarian worker
- Isabel Bayrakdarian – soprano
- Garen Boyajian – actor
- Atom Egoyan – filmmaker
- Eve Egoyan – pianist and artist
- Anoush Ellah – drag queen
- Hagop Goudsouzian – filmmaker
- Levon Ichkhanian – guitarist, entertainment personality
- Malak Karsh – photographer
- Yousuf Karsh – photographer
- Maryvonne Kendergi – pianist
- Noura Kevorkian – writer, director, producer
- Arsinee Khanjian – actress
- Serouj Kradjian – pianist
- Catherine Manoukian – violinist
- Andrea Martin – actress
- Patrick Masbourian – radio and television personality, film director
- Peter Oundjian – violinist and conductor
- Alice Panikian – 2006 Miss Universe Canada
- Raffi – children's singer-songwriter
- Vahram Sargsyan – composer and choral conductor
- Anita Sarkeesian – feminist media critic
- Shant Srabian - Actor
- John Vernon – actor
- Petros Shoujounian – Composer

== Business ==
- Jack Kachkar – businessman

== Politics and public service ==
- Andre Arthur – former Independent Conservative MP, 2006–2011, talk radio host
- Sarkis Assadourian – former Liberal MP, 1993–2004
- Ann Cavoukian – former Information and Privacy Commissioner of Ontario
- Harout Chitilian – city councilor and chairman of the City Council of Montreal
- Raymond Setlakwe – entrepreneur, politician, lawyer
- Michelle Setlakwe – politician, lawyer

== Scientists ==
- Armen Parsyan - General/oncological surgeon and world-renown/leading scientist/researcher who has many degrees and accolades/awards from the top universities around the world.
- Levon Pogosian – astrophysicist
- Suren Gigoyan – Adjunct Professor, University of Waterloo

== Writers ==
- Shaunt Basmajian – author
- Artashes Keshishyan – author

Lorne Shirinian was born in Toronto in 1945. He is a poet, novelist, playwright, memoirist, and the author of many academic studies on Armenian diaspora literature. He is the author of 30 books. Shirinian is professor emeritus of English and Comparative Literature at the Royal Military College of Canada. He founded and edited Manna, a review of contemporary poetry, in 1972 which published interviews and poems from all over the world. In 1994, he founded Blue Heron Press. At this writing, he is at work on his new novel, Troubled, which will be available in the summer of 2024.

== See also ==
- List of French-Armenians
- List of Armenian-Americans
- List of Russian-Armenians
- List of Armenians
- Armenian diaspora
- Canadians of Armenian descent
