= Clive O. Callender =

American surgeon

Clive O. Callender (born 1936) is an American surgeon and professor of surgery at Howard University College of Medicine in Washington, D.C. Trained in organ transplantation, he founded the Howard University Hospital Transplant Center in 1974. To increase the frequency of organ donation among African Americans he founded the National Minority Organ Tissue Transplant Education Program (MOTTEP) in 1991. During the 2019/20 academic year he continued his academic work as Professor of Surgery at Howard University College of Medicine.

Callender was born in New York City and attended public schools there. He received a B.S. degree in chemistry and physiology from Hunter College and a M.D. degree from Meharry Medical College. After surgical training at Harlem Hospital, Freedmen's Hospital, and Memorial Hospital for Cancer and Allied Disease, he joined the faculty of Howard University College of Medicine in 1969. After a fellowship in transplant surgery at the University of Minnesota with John Najarian and Richard Simmons, he returned to Howard University to found the Howard University Hospital Transplant Center in 1974, a first among historically black medical schools. He was only the third African American transplant surgeon.

To enhance organ donation among African Americans and hence improve transplantation outcomes, he founded the National Minority Organ Tissue Transplant Education Program (MOTTEP), which received $16 million in funding over two decades from the National Institutes of Health Office of Research On Minority Health. Since the beginning of the program African American organ donation rates more than tripled. He was a leader in the fight against discriminatory policies in organ allocation. Authoring over a hundred scientific publications he became Professor of Surgery and Chair of the Department of Surgery at Howard University in 1996. He has been a national expert and spokesman promoting organ donation and transplantation among African Americans, who suffer disproportionately from chronic renal failure.

A lifelong Christian, he served as a medical missionary in Africa early in his career. He was a featured speaker at the 2013 Annual Spirituality and Medicine Conference. In 2014, he was honored with a National Minority Donor Awareness Award and an honorary doctoral degree by Howard University.
