= Sam K. Harrison =

American soldier (1908–1994)

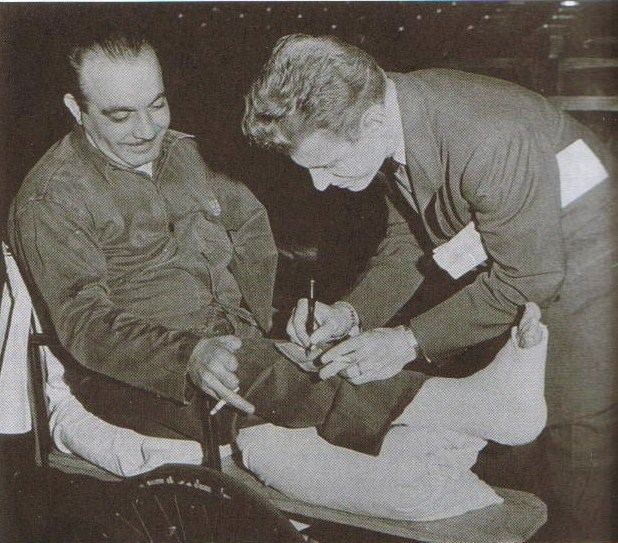
- Sam K. Harrison (left)
- Born: Samuel Kazar Harootenian; December 12, 1908; Chicago, Illinois
- Died: January 1, 1994 (aged 85); San Francisco, California
- Spouse: Audrey Winter
- Military career
- Allegiance: United States
- Branch: United States Army
- Service years: April 1, 1943 – February, 1946
- Rank: Corporal
- Nickname: "The man who refused to die"
- Conflicts: World War II: Rhineland; Central Europe; Ardennes; Northern France
- Awards: Purple Heart; American Campaign Medal; Good Conduct Medal; European Campaign Medal (4); World War II Victory Medal

Sam K. Harrison or Sam Kazar Harootenian (December 12, 1908 – January 1, 1994) was a corporal in the United States Army during World War II. He served nine months overseas and participated in the campaigns of Northern France, Ardennes, Rhineland and Central Europe.

Harrison is known as "the man who refused to die" because of the numerous injuries he sustained while in combat. During one battle, Harrison lost his left arm, kneecap, and three fingers on his right hand. Although he was pronounced dead, he survived. Despite 27 months in hospitals and 33 surgical operations, he went on to found and head two successful corporations and attain high civic honors.

== Early life ==
Of Armenian descent, Harrison was born December 12, 1908, in Chicago, Illinois, the second son of Kazar, who was a farmer near Fowler, California and Mariam (Kazarian) Harrison, a housewife, both from Kharpert, Ottoman Empire. He had one brother, George, and two sisters, Agnes and Syble.

== Military service ==
Harrison joined the US Army and was assigned to the 280th Field Artillery Battalion which was activated at Camp Cooke (today Vandenberg Air Force Base) in California. The Battalion was then moved to Fort Sill in Oklahoma in February 1944, for a three-month stay at Field Artillery School. He then trained for overseas duty at Camp Polk, Louisiana.

=== World War II ===
Harrison was sent overseas to the European theatre of World War II. He embarked from Boston on the USS West Point on September 7, 1944, and landed at Utah Beach, Normandy, on September 18, 1944. He soon engaged in the Battle of the Hurtgen Forest and by February 6, 1945, he was on the West Side of the Roer River. As part of the first Artillery Battalion of the 9th Army, he crossed the Roer on February 24.

"Face up to it, Sam, decide right now how you'll take all this. Someday you'll be out in the world, crippled. Will you whine and complain and lose all your friends? Are you going to talk, talk, talk about it, tell how you're suffering, get everybody to pitying you-and running from you? Or are you going to smile, shut up about your pains, be warmly interested in other people, and forget yourself by helping others?"

— Sam K. Harrison after his injuries

Harrison recalled his part in the push to the Rhine: "Our artillery scouts made their own reconnaissance and went into position as an isolated unit; reached the Rhine on March 5, 1945; crossed the Rhine on March 27, 1945." He was then part of the drive to the Elbe and reached Hanover by April 2, 1945.

In Hanover and just three weeks before the war ended, Harrison and other members of the No. 1 gun of the 280th Field Artillery were hit by a German gun directed from an observation tower mounted on a steeple of a church. The German gun, which had a direct hit on their gunning position, caused three deaths, wounded five and stunned twenty-five men. Of the living wounded, Harrison was nearest to death; his left arm was torn off near the shoulder, he lost three fingers on his right hand, his right knee had been crushed and his pelvic bones were shattered. When Harrison demanded a tourniquet, one of the combatants ripped off his web belt and tied it around the leg. A moment later a medic applied a real tourniquet. Then Harrison was transported to a field hospital where he underwent emergency surgeries. According to Harrison, the doctors stated that "we'd better list him as killed in action" and another said "He'll die on the operating table."

Harrison survived the surgeries, was transferred to a hospital in Paris but was not expected to live. Even though Harrison showed signs of recovery, his recovery slowed down considerably when news of both his parents death reached him.

Once Harrison was stable, he was sent back to the United States and transferred to the Bushnell Hospital in Brigham City, Utah for more surgery. Harrison was then transferred to the Letterman Army Hospital in San Francisco where he was given a wheelchair and intensive rehabilitation. After surgeons had grafted bones into his crushed knee, Harrison began to walk again with the help of a cane and leg brace.

== Later life ==
After being discharged on March 17, 1947, Harrison returned to the United States and lived in San Francisco on 4612 Nineteenth Street. He and Eugene Bonini, another veteran of the war, opened a hardware store in 1946. The company grew by providing surplus military goods to major governmental institutions and private companies such as the U.S. Navy, local ship repair facilities and commercial businesses, Aerojet General, and Campbell Soup.

In 1950, Harrison founded the On-Off Chemical Corporation, which manufactured and distributed On-Off, a waterless cleaner for hands.

== Community service ==
Harrison was appointed to the board of trustees as vice-president of the War Memorial of San Francisco in 1949 by Mayor Elmer E. Robinson and elected President of the board of trustees in December 1954. He was reappointed for five additional six-year terms.

He was the past second Vice-Commander of the American Legion of Zan Irwin Post No. 93; a life member of Veterans of Foreign Wars; a life member of the Military Order of the Purple Heart; Disabled American Veterans Organizer and First Commander of the William Randolph Hearst Chapter No. 144 and Past Commander of the San Francisco Chapter No. 3.

At the request of the Commanding General of Letterman Army Hospital, he engaged in extensive rehabilitation work with wounded Korean War veterans between 1950 and 1956.

Harrison was also a member of the San Francisco Traffic Club (honorary member), State of California Armenian-American Citizen's League (honorary life-member), Commonwealth Club and the American National Committee to Aid Homeless Armenians (ANCHA).

== Death ==
Harrison died on January 1, 1994. He had no children.

== Military awards ==
Harrison's military awards include:

Purple Heart
Good Conduct Medal
American Campaign Medal
European-African-Middle Eastern Campaign Medal with four bronze campaign stars
World War II Victory Medal

== Recognition and legacy ==
Harrison was nationally named "Hero of the Year" for rehabilitation work by the Disabled American Veterans in 1950.

He was the subject of the article entitled "The Man Who Refused to Die" by Vera Connolly, published in Red Book Magazine, October 1951. The article was reprinted in Reader's Digest, March 1952 and also reprinted in book form by Twayne Publishers and released as an anthology in 1953 entitled "Courage is the Key."

He was deemed as a Knight of the Order of the Compassionate Heart on December 18, 1975.

Harrison was the subject of a radio play entitled "The Empty Sleeve" by Irve Tunick which aired on an hour long nationwide broadcast on August 14, 1951, on the CBS network.

He was the subject of an article "A Universal Experience: My Favorite Story" by Vera Connolly published by the United States Department of Labor and printed by the President's Committee on Employment of the Physically Handicapped.

Former San Francisco mayor Elmer E. Robinson said about Harrison:

Sam Harrison is an inspiration to everyone who knows him. His tremendous force of character is evident in his fight back to a position of great usefulness to this community. He's a wonderful American. He sets us all a great example of patriotism and unselfish community service.
