= Mark Saroyan =

Mark Andrew Saroyan (April 6, 1960 – July 21, 1994) was a professor of Islamic and Soviet studies, focusing on religion and ethnicity in Central Asia and the Caucasus.

Saroyan received his B.A. in history from Princeton University. He later began studying Soviet politics at UC Berkeley in 1986. In 1990 he became one of the first doctorate students of Berkeley's Soviet and Post-Soviet Studies program. After his graduation, Saroyan was hired as an assistant professor of political science at Harvard. At the same time he was diagnosed with a fatal illness. Though he took his position at Harvard, due to his worsening state Saroyan returned to Berkeley in 1993. He died on July 21, 1994, at the age of 34.

Saroyan was a unique voice in the field of Soviet studies, especially concerning Islam in the Soviet Union. At a time when the field was focused on elite-politics within Russia proper, Saroyan emphasized anthropological approaches among the other Soviet republics. Unlike other contemporary scholars such as Alexandre Bennigsen and Hélène Carrère d'Encausse who portrayed regional Islam as a static, anti-Soviet force, Saroyan examined the constantly shifting nature of the religion and its elite in an ever-evolving historical and sociopolitical context. Going against prevailing Western views, Saroyan argued that Islam was not a threat to Soviet rule. More generally, he also argued against the theory, found in both Soviet and Western writings, that Islam, along with other religions, was an anachronism that would soon disappear from the region.

Besides religious issues, Saroyan examined ethnic issues in the former Soviet Union, especially Armenia–Azerbaijan relations and the First Nagorno-Karabakh War.

Saroyan was additionally involved in policy discussions, participating in conferences in the United States, Europe, Turkey, and Iran.

A skilled linguist, he spoke Armenian, Azeri, French, German, Persian, Russian, Turkish, and Uzbek.

== Publications ==
- Trouble in the Transcaucasus. Bulletin of the Atomic Scientists. Mar 1989. Vol. 45, No. 2. pp. 16–20.
- Rethinking Islam in the Soviet Union. in. Susan Gross Solomon ed. [ Beyond Sovietology: essays in politics and history]. Armonk: M.E. Sharpe, 1993. pp. 23–48
- Mark Saroyan, Beyond the Nation-State: Culture and Ethnic Politics in Soviet Transcaucasia in

Ronald Suny ed. Nationalism and Social Change. University of Michigan Press, 1996).

- The Armenian Protests: Is It Passion or Politics? GAIA Research Series. 1997.
