= Alex Sevanian =

American pharmacologist

Alex Sevanian (November 3, 1946 – February 17, 2005) was an American pharmacologist.

== Early life and family ==
Sevanian was born in Germany and emigrated to the United States with his family, settling first in San Francisco and later in the San Fernando Valley (near Los Angeles). Alex Sevanian's father, Ara Sevanian (Born, May 21, 1916, Armenia. Died, January 4, 2011, Mission Hills, California), was a composer and canonist whose works have been performed by the Los Angeles Philharmonic and the Chattanooga Symphony and Opera, among others. Alex Sevanian, with his wife, Diana Lynn Sevanian, had two sons, David Alexander Sevanian and Andrew Maximillian Sevanian.

== Career ==
Sevanian earned his bachelor's degree in biology from California State University, Northridge and his master's degree and Ph.D. from the University of California at Los Angeles (UCLA). He went on to do postdoctoral work at UCLA under James Mead, and worked as an assistant research biochemist in the Laboratory of Nuclear Medicine and Radiation Biology. In 1981, Sevanian became one of the founding faculty members of Dr. Paul Hochstein's Institute for Toxicology at the University of Southern California (USC), which specialized in free radical and oxidative stress research. Sevanian was promoted from assistant professor to associate professor and then to full professor. The institute merged into the department of molecular pharmacology and toxicology of the school of pharmacy at USC in the early 1990s, and Sevanian remained there as a professor of molecular pharmacology and toxicology. He also held an appointment as professor of pathology in USC's Keck School of Medicine. In 1988, Sevanian became a founding member of the Oxygen Society (now the Society for Free Radical Biology & Medicine), later serving as councillor, secretary general, and finally treasurer of the International Society for Free Radical Research (SFRR International). Sevanian died from cancer on February 17, 2005.

== Research ==
Sevanian made major contributions to the understanding of phospholipases as repair enzymes for oxidized membrane lipids. He worked to identify specific oxidative mechanisms in atherosclerosis. He researched the effects of lipid peroxidation, oxidative stress, and modified lipoproteins in the progression of cardiovascular disease, seeking ways to convert research findings into therapeutic interventions. Along with his colleagues in the USC Atherosclerosis Research Unit, Sevanian identified a modified low-density lipoprotein (LDL) that contributes to atherosclerosis in humans.
