= Josh Pahigian =

American sportswriter

Joshua R. Pahigian (born January 22, 1974) is an American author who specializes in books and articles about baseball. He is particularly well known as an expert in the field of sports travel, writing books on this topic as well as articles that have appeared in espn.com. Most popular among Pahigian's books are: The Ultimate Baseball Road-trip and 101 Baseball Places to See Before You Strike Out.

In 2015, Pahigian received a legislative commendation from the Commonwealth of Massachusetts House of Representatives for "his commitment to preserving the history of America's favorite pastime." His travels and the books that chronicle them have also been featured in USA Today and other national publications.

Pahigian has also written short stories that have been published in American literary journals such as Passages North, the Hawaii Review, and Ararat, and has been translated in several Armenian language periodicals and anthologies. He is known to Armenian readers for the juxtaposition that his work is said to present between modern American values and enduring Armenian cultural tradition.

Pahigian's first novel, Strangers on the Beach was published in October 2012 by Maine-based Islandport Press. The mystery, set in Old Orchard Beach, Maine, crosses the story-line of a billionaire adventurer, who arrives in Old Orchard Beach under unusual circumstances one summer, with the stories of several townies. The book was named a 2012 Indie Sleeper Pick by Publishers Weekly, and a Best Books of 2012 selection by the Maine Edge.

Pahigian is a Mentor in the Western Connecticut State University Low Residency Master of Fine Arts program in Creative and Professional Writing, and Director of the University of New England Center for Global Humanities in Portland, Maine, where he hosts a podcast titled Oh, the Humanities.

== Books ==
Year	Title	Publisher	
2004	The Ultimate Baseball Road Trip	The Lyons Press	-
2005	Spring Training Handbook	McFarland Publishing	-
2005	Why I Hate the Yankees	The Lyons Press	-
2006	The Red Sox in the Playoffs	McFarland Publishing	-
2007	The Ultimate Minor League Baseball Road Trip	The Lyons Press	-
2008	101 Baseball Places to See Before You Strike Out	The Lyons Press	-
2010	The Seventh Inning Stretch	The Lyons Press	-
2012	The Ultimate Baseball Road Trip, 2nd Edition	The Lyons Press	-
2012	Strangers on the Beach: A Novel	Islandport Press	-
2013	Spring Training Handbook, 2nd Edition	McFarland Publishing	-
2015	101 Baseball Places to See Before You Strike Out, 2nd Edition	The Lyons Press	-
2017	The Amazing Baseball Adventure	The Lyons Press	-
