= Robert Nalbandyan =

Armenian chemist

- Ռոբերտ Նալբանդյան
- Born: 1937; Yerevan
- Died: 2002 (aged 64–65)
- Education: Moscow State University
- Known for: Discovery of photosynthetic protein plantacyanin
- Scientific career
- Fields: Chemistry

Robert M. Nalbandyan (Armenian: Ռոբերտ Նալբանդյան, 1937–2002) was an Armenian chemist, the co-discoverer of photosynthetic protein plantacyanin, a pioneer in the field of free radicals, and a noted and prolific writer on various subjects in the field of chemistry.

Born in Yerevan, Armenia and educated at Moscow State University in Moscow, Russia, Nalbandyan lived and worked in Yerevan for most of his life, where he also headed a laboratory and lectured. He was recognized as one of Soviet Union's most prominent chemists, and in his research collaborated with fellow chemists in the USSR, US, Europe, and Australia. When the Armenian Soviet Socialist Republic struck for independence in 1989, Nalbandyan became a prominent critic of the nationalist movement, which he felt was foolhardy and was merely agitating the people for political gain. The energy shortage, economic woes, and virtual blockade experienced after independence seemed to justify his concerns. In 1996 he left the country and emigrated to the United States.

Primarily known in the scientific community for his research work with proteins, Nalbandyan was also recognized among his fellow scientists as a progressive thinker in other fields of chemistry, including neurochemistry.
