= Samuel Aroutiounian =

American producer

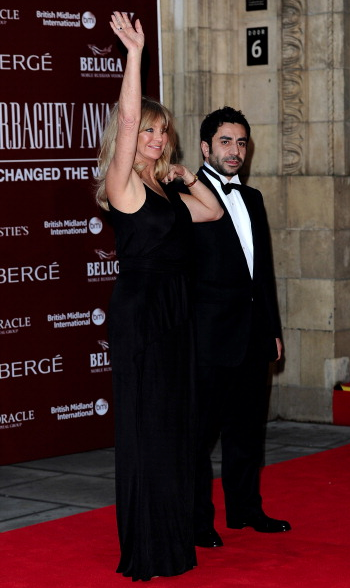
- Samuel Aroutiounian and Goldie Hawn at President Gorbachev's 80th Birthday Gala
- Born: September 17, 1976 (age 49)
- Occupation: Producer

Samuel Aroutounian (Russian: Сэм Арутюнян; born September 17, 1976) is an American producer and entrepreneur of Armenian descent who serves as the president of Creative Talent Management.

== Background ==
Born into a doctor's family in Soviet Armenia, he moved to Moscow with his family at a young age and later graduated with Honors from Moscow State Academy of Water Transport in 1998 with a master's degree in International Law.

Samuel moved to the United States where he started his career traveling the US as a modeling scout. In 2005 he joined Platinum Rye Entertainment as an international partner and producer and later started his own company, Creative Talent Management.

== Career ==
Samuel is involved in many charitable projects and was instrumental in producing Mikhail Gorbachev’s "The Man Who Changed the World" award ceremony in London's Royal Albert Hall, for which he received recognition from President Gorbachev. As part of this charitable event, Samuel collaborated with Paul Anka on the song, “The Man Who Changed the World” which was performed alongside the Scorpions and the London Symphony Orchestra. In 2015 Samuel produced the animated film, 'Savva, Heart of a Warrior' alongside a cast that included Sharon Stone, Milla Jovovich, Whoopi Goldberg and Joe Pesci.

He has also discovered bands such as Mr. Mother, who won the first place award at the 2018 White Nights Festival in St. Petersburg, Russia.

In 2019, Samuel started the record label and recording studio Court Square Recordings in Memphis, TN.
