= Mark Krikorian (activist) =

Right-wing American activist

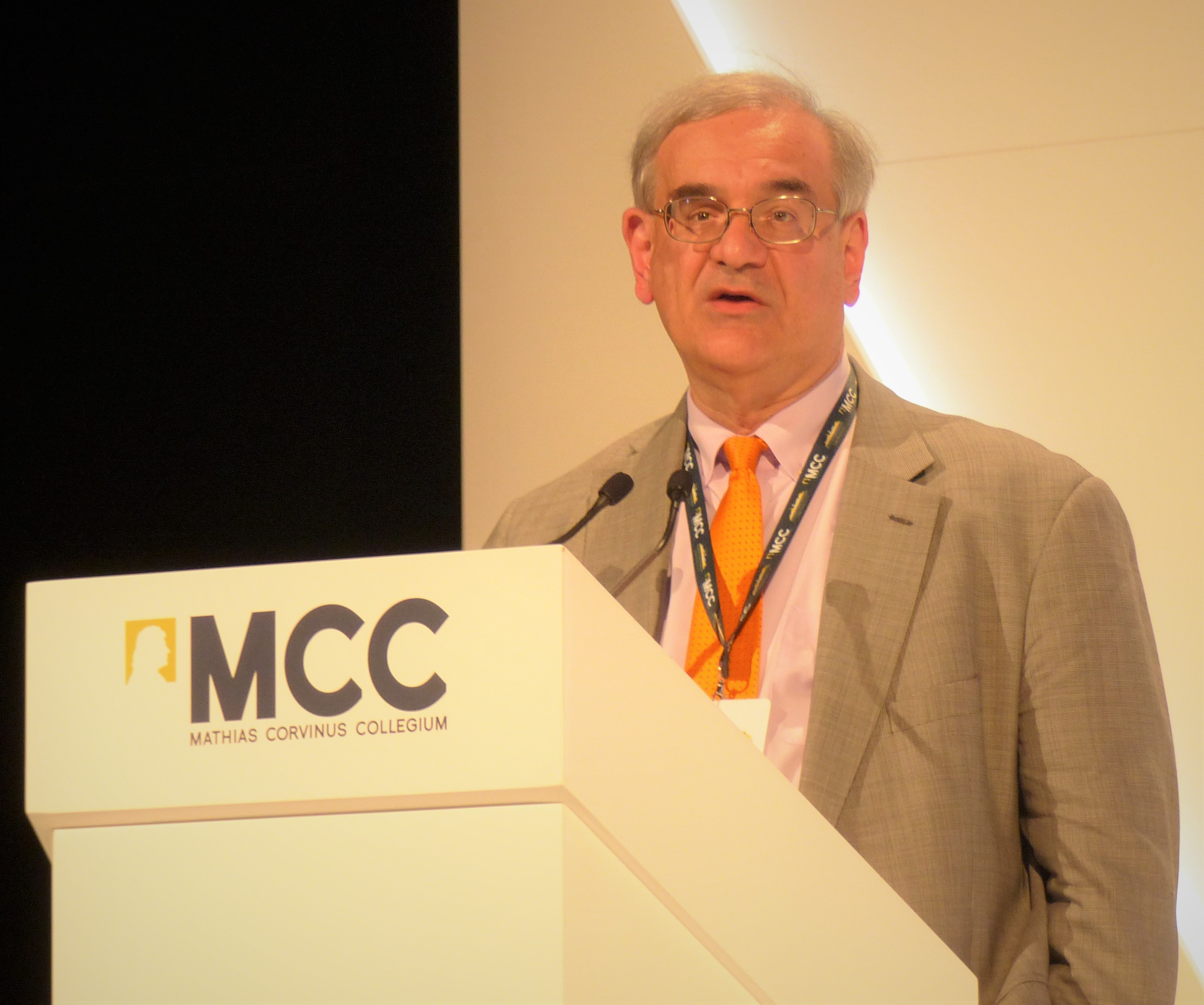
- Krikorian in 2019
- Born: 1960 or 1961 (age 65–66)
- Education: Georgetown University (BA); Tufts University (MA)

Mark Krikorian (born 1960 or 1961) is a right-wing American activist who has been the executive director of the Center for Immigration Studies, an American anti-immigration think tank. Since 1995. Krikorian has been a contributor to National Review, a conservative publication. Krikorian is credited with popularizing the concept of illegal immigrant self-deportation with the term "attrition through enforcement", and is an advisor to Project 2025, a right-wing conservative political initiative by the Heritage Foundation, a conservative think tank.

== Early life and education ==
Krikorian was born in the United States to American-born parents of Armenian descent from the (former) Soviet Republic. His father worked as a chef and restaurant manager, moving his family from New Haven, to Boston, Cleveland, Chicago, and then Boston again, always living in densely Armenian neighborhoods. His parents spoke to their children in Armenian but to each other in English. Krikorian knew only Armenian when he entered kindergarten. He lost his right eye to a retinal blastoma while still a baby.

He earned his B.A. at Georgetown University and a master's at the Fletcher School of Law and Diplomacy at Tufts University, further spending two years studying at the Yerevan State University in then-Soviet Armenia.

== Career ==
Krikorian was an editor at the Winchester Star, a local newspaper in Virginia, and worked as editor of an electronic media publication on marketing. He wrote for the monthly newsletter of the Federation for American Immigration Reform, before joining CIS in February 1995. A comment in one of his articles in the National Review was called misogynistic; he had said about President Obama that he was "an effete vacillator who is pushed around by his female subordinates".

In January 2013, ABC News listed Krikorian as one of the top 20 immigration experts to follow on Twitter in the United States. In September 2024 Krikorian testified before Congress, being questioned about comments he made about Haiti, which he said was "so screwed up because it wasn't colonized long enough".

== Books ==
- The New Case Against Immigration, Both Legal and Illegal, Sentinel HC, 2008. ISBN 1-59523-035-1
- How Obama is Transforming America Through Immigration, Encounter Broadsides, 2010. ISBN 1-59403-488-5
- Open Immigration: Yea and Nay, By Mark Krikorian and Alex Nowrasteh, Encounter Books, 2014. ISBN 1-59403-821-X
