= Michael Najarian =

Michael Najarian (born August 11, 1952) is an American relationship and communication expert, and former host of nationally syndicated Mars/Venus Radio Show. Najarian has been associated with John Gray, an author and registered counselor.

== Life and career ==
Najarian was born on August 11, 1952, in Fresno, California. At present Najarian is living with his family on a small Island near Seattle.

Najarian performed his nationally acclaimed one-man show, Men Are From Mars, Women Are From Venus – Life on Earth, for numerous Fortune 500 companies, the United States Armed Forces, the Drug Enforcement Administration, the Young Presidents' Organization as well as numerous other state, local, public and private entities. Najarian received a master's degree in psychology and counseling in February 1997 from Prescott College.

Michael Najarian died at his home in Tennessee on Sunday, August 20, 2023 as a result of Parkinsons disease.
