= John Najarian =

American transplant surgeon (1927–2020)

John S. Najarian
- Born: December 22, 1927; Oakland, California
- Died: September 1, 2020 (aged 92); Stillwater, Minnesota
- Education: University of California, Berkeley
- Relatives: Pete Najarian (son)
- Medical career
- Profession: Surgeon
- Institutions: University of Minnesota
- Sub-specialties: Organ transplants

John Sarkis Najarian (December 22, 1927 – September 1, 2020) was an American transplant surgeon and clinical professor of transplant surgery at the University of Minnesota. Najarian was a pioneer in thoracic transplant surgery.

== Early life ==
Najarian was born in Oakland, California to Armenian immigrants. He studied medicine at the University of California, Berkeley, where he was also an offensive tackle for the college's football team, and played in the 1949 Rose Bowl.

== Career ==
After college, Najarian achieved success as a transplant surgeon, and soon joined the University of Minnesota under Owen Wangensteen, whom he succeeded in 1967 as head of the surgical department. Then, he built a program where he was a leader at kidney, liver, pancreas and other transplants.

Najarian was chairman of the department of surgery at the University of Minnesota Medical School from 1967 until 1993. He was the author of nearly a thousand articles in the medical literature. He was a founding member of the American Society of Transplant Surgeons and served as its fourth president. His transplant surgery fellowship program trained many prominent transplant surgeons and included minority surgeons including Clive O. Callender, who founded the transplant program at Howard University College of Medicine. He did pioneering work in kidney transplantations in children during the 1970s, developing the anti-rejection drug anti-lymphocyte globulin, in pediatric liver transplantation and in xenotransplantation of porcine Islets for Type I diabetes. He'd also help patients with fragilities in which other doctors couldn't perform. He was the doctor that announced to the media the discovery of the inoperable tumor on Hubert Humphrey's pelvic bone in August 1977. One of Najarian's most famous medical operations was a liver transplant which occurred at the University of Minnesota in 1982, and had infant Jaime Fiske as his patient.

== ALG controversy ==
In 1995, Najarian was indicted by the Food and Drug Administration (FDA) for illegally and improperly marketing and selling anti-lymphocyte globulin (ALG), an anti-rejection drug. Najarian was later acquitted of these charges, with the presiding judge and legal and medical experts questioning the motives and purposes of FDA prosecutors and regulators.

== Personal life and death ==
Najarian was married to Mignette for 67 years until her death in 2019. They had four sons, including Pete Najarian.

Najarian died September 1, 2020, in Stillwater, Minnesota at the age of 92.

== See also ==
- Right-to-try law
