= Peter Najarian =

American television presenter (born 1963)

- Born: December 22, 1963 (age 62); San Francisco, California, U.S.
- Education: University of Minnesota
- Occupations: Co-founder of optionMONSTER, tradeMONSTER
- Spouse: Lisa Najarian
- Family: John Najarian (father)

Peter Michael Najarian is an American options trader, television personality, market analyst and co-founder of options news and education firm optionMONSTER. Along with his brother, Jon Najarian, he founded an online brokerage called tradeMONSTER in October 2008, which sends trading information through the Web without requiring clients to download trading software. In 2016, Najarian co-founded Market Rebellion, a provider of options for education, commentary and trading strategies.

Najarian was a contributor on CNBC's Fast Money show alongside Guy Adami, Steve Grasso, Dan Nathan, Karen Finerman and Tim Seymour. He has also served on the NaturalShrimp, Inc. advisory board.

== Biography ==
Najarian was born in Minnesota to transplant surgeon John Najarian.

=== Football career ===
Najarian played college football with the University of Minnesota Golden Gophers as a linebacker. He was named to the All-Big Ten second-team for three years from 1983 to 1985 and got awarded the school's Carl Eller award for outstanding defensive player for three consecutive years, from 1983 to 1985. He also served as the team's captain in 1985. After earning a degree from the University of Minnesota, he became a professional football player with the Tampa Bay Buccaneers and Minnesota Vikings. Pete also played for the Sacramento Surge and won a World Bowl in 1992.

=== Post-playing career ===
Najarian became an options trader in 1992 with the encouragement of his brother, Jon Najarian, who worked for Mercury Trading at the Chicago Board Options Exchange. Pete Najarian became president of Mercury, a position he held from 2000 to 2004 and oversaw the company's sale to Citadel LLC.

He has appeared on the CNBC financial investing show Fast Money.

Beginning with the 2013 season, he became a commentator for ESPN's college football coverage.

On February 17, 2021, aquaculture company NaturalShrimp, Inc. announced the appointment of Najarian to its advisory board.
