= Gokor Chivichyan =

Armenian-American martial artist

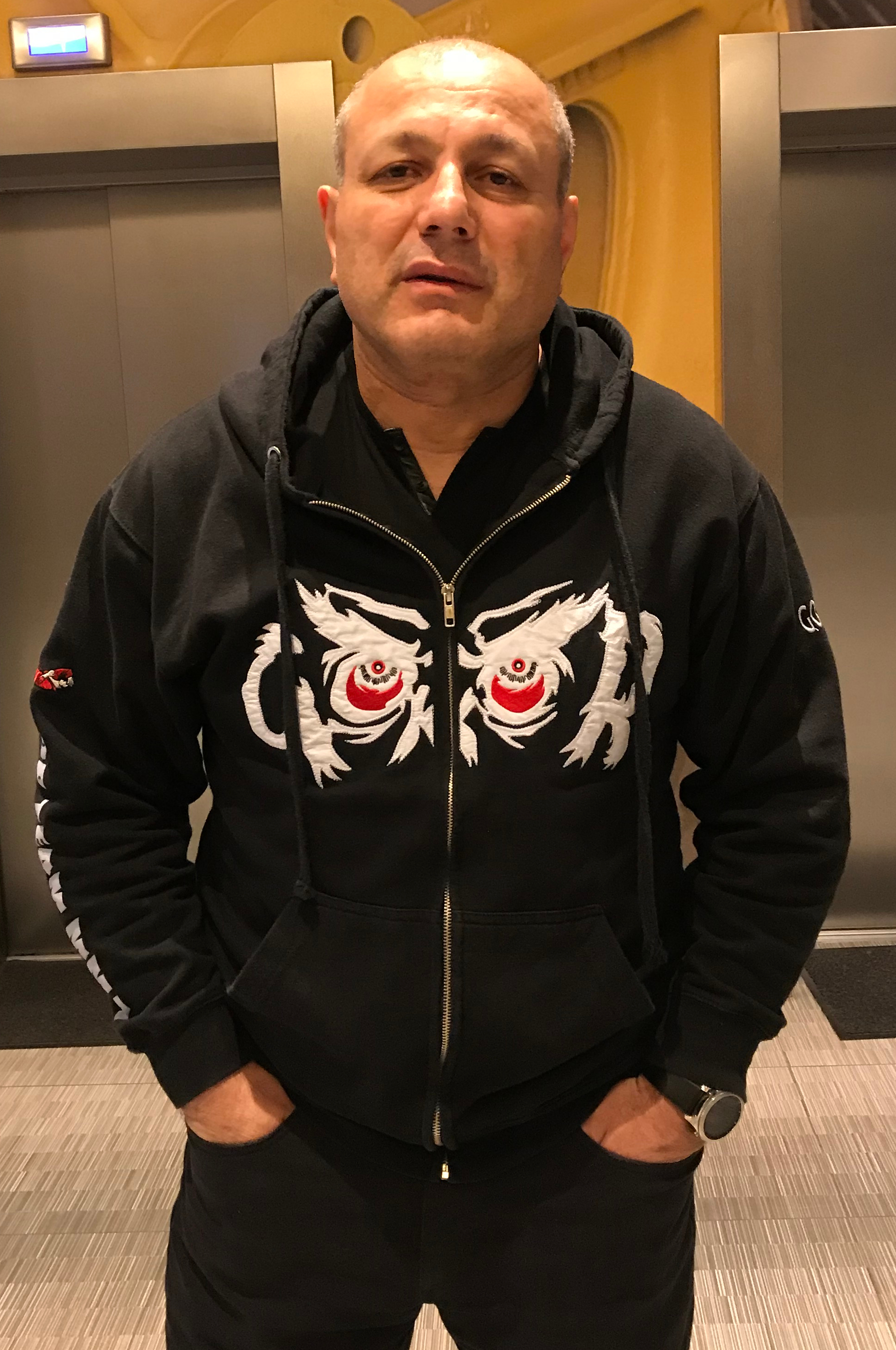
- Born: Գոքոր Չիվիչյան; May 10, 1963 (age 63); Yerevan, Armenian SSR, Soviet Union
- Nationality: American
- Height: 5 ft 10 in (178 cm)
- Rank: 7th degree black belt In judo 9th dan black belt in Kyokushin Budokai; 3rd degree black belt in Brazilian jiu-jitsu

Mixed martial arts record
- Total: 1
- Wins: 1
- By submission: 1
- Losses: 0

Other information
- Occupation: Martial artist, trainer
- Notable relatives: Gary Chivichyan, son
- Notable students: Ronda Rousey, Karo Parisyan, Manvel Gamburyan, Karen Darabedyan, Sako Chivitchian, Roman Mitichyan, Neil Melanson, Tony Halme
- Mixed martial arts record from Sherdog

Gokor Grigor Chivichyan (Armenian: Գոքոր Չիվիչյան; born May 10, 1963) is an Armenian-American martial artist and trainer in judo, submission grappling, and mixed martial arts. Chivichyan currently trains professional and amateur athletes at Hayastan MMA Academy in North Hollywood, California, United States.

== Martial arts career ==
Chivichyan was born in Yerevan, Armenia and is the youngest of three brothers. Chivichyan began his training as a child in Soviet Armenia, winning national junior titles in judo, sambo, and wrestling. At the age of 17, Chivichyan relocated to Los Angeles, California where he continued his training in catch wrestling and judo under Gene LeBell, a grappler who learned from Lou Thesz and Ed "Strangler" Lewis. Throughout the 1980s and early 1990s, Chivichyan traveled and competed in the Soviet Union and throughout Europe, Japan, Thailand, and Mexico. After opening the Hayastan Academy in 1991, Chivichyan retired from professional competition.

In 1997, Chivichyan came out of retirement for a bout organized by the World Fighting Federation. His opponent was intended to be Akira Maeda, but the promoters were unable to sign him and instead matched Chivichyan against Bill Maeda, who was dubbed "Mr. Maeda". Chivichyan submitted Maeda via armbar in 50 seconds.

Black Belt Magazine named Chivichyan the “Judo Instructor of the Year” in 1997 and inducted him into their hall of fame. Since then, his school has produced fighters such as Manvel Gamburyan, Sako Chivitchian, Neil Melanson, Karen Darabedyan, Roman Mitichyan, Ronda Rousey, and Karo Parisyan, who have competed in the UFC, WEC, King of the Cage, Olympics and national championships.

In February 2005, the United States Ju-Jitsu Federation (ISJJF) awarded him the rank of 7th dan in judo.

Chivichyan returned to competition at the 2008 USJA-USJF Winter Nationals, the first national judo championship endorsed by both organizations. He competed in the male masters (49 years) middleweight division, winning gold after defeating Gary Butts by uchi mata in the finals.

Chivichyan competed at the 2019 IBJJF Pan American Jiu-Jitsu Championships in the black belt-heavyweight-master 6 age division. He defeated Van Dyck Oliveira, the only other competitor in his bracket. In August 2019, Chivichyan competed at the IBJJF World Master Jiu-Jitsu Championship, winning gold in the black belt-heavyweight-master 6 age division. He finished the year at the SJJIF World Jiu-Jitsu Championship, where he was the only entrant in the black belt-super heavy-56 year old gi and no-gi divisions.

== Mixed martial arts record ==
Professional record breakdown
| 1 match | 1 win | 0 losses |
| By submission | 1 | 0 |

| Res. | Record | Opponent | Method | Event | Date | Round | Time | Location | Notes |
|---|---|---|---|---|---|---|---|---|---|
| Win | 1–0 | Bill Maeda | Submission (armbar) | WFF - World Fighting Federation | February 24, 1997 | 1 | 0:50 | Birmingham, Alabama United States | |
