= Jonathan Brookins =

American mixed martial arts fighter

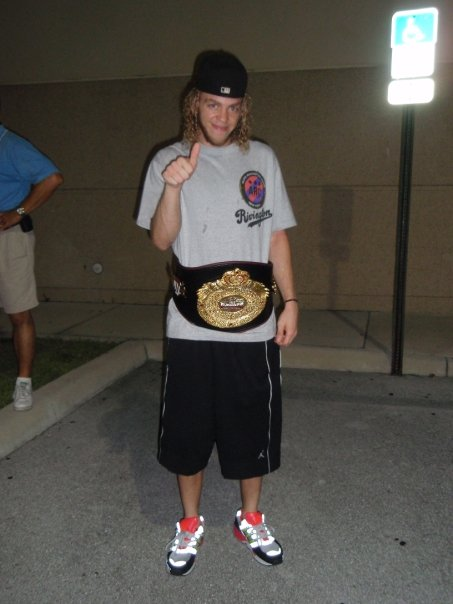
- Born: August 13, 1985 (age 41); Portland, Oregon, U.S.
- Height: 6 ft 0 in (1.83 m)
- Weight: 145 lb (66 kg; 10 st 5 lb)
- Division: Flyweight; Bantamweight; Featherweight; Lightweight
- Reach: 74 in (188 cm)
- Fighting out of: Orlando, Florida, United States
- Rank: Purple belt in Brazilian Jiu-Jitsu
- Years active: 2006–2017, 2025

Mixed martial arts record
- Total: 27
- Wins: 16
- By knockout: 3
- By submission: 9
- By decision: 4
- Losses: 11
- By knockout: 2
- By submission: 2
- By decision: 7

Other information
- Mixed martial arts record from Sherdog

Jonathan Brookins (born August 13, 1985) is an American former mixed martial artist who competed as a featherweight for the Ultimate Fighting Championship. A professional MMA competitor since 2006, Brookins has mostly fought in Florida, as well as competing in The Ultimate Fighter: Team GSP vs. Team Koscheck. On December 4, 2010, Brookins defeated Michael Johnson to become the Ultimate Fighter and earn a contract with the UFC. During his time at Lindenwood University, he was also the college roommate of former fellow UFC fighter Mike Rio.

== Early life ==
Brookins was born on August 13, 1985, in Portland, Oregon. He attended high school at Century High School in Hillsboro, Oregon, a suburb of Portland. There he started wrestling, winning a state title his senior year and earning a scholarship to Lindenwood University.

== Mixed martial arts career ==
=== Background ===
Brookins was introduced to mixed martial arts by Charles Bennett. After meeting him and training with him, Brookins made his professional MMA debut against Allen Berube, a TUF 5 veteran. Having only trained in wrestling, Brookins surprised himself by winning via KO in under twenty seconds.

Brookins has mostly fought at featherweight, most notably in World Extreme Cagefighting where he lost to José Aldo via TKO in the third round. Brookins would later rebound at Bellator 1 where he defeated Stephen Ledbetter via submission (rear naked choke).

Brookins then won two fights in G-Force fights, the most notable being a submission victory over Luis Palomino.

=== The Ultimate Fighter ===
Brookins then signed with the Ultimate Fighting Championship to compete in The Ultimate Fighter: Team GSP vs. Team Koscheck.

In the debut episode, Brookins faced fellow wrestler Ran Weathers. Brookins would go on to take a unanimous decision victory in two rounds. Following this, Brookins was selected by Team GSP. Brookins was GSPs second pick and the fourth overall.

Brookins was picked by GSP to face Sevak Magakian in the preliminary house fights. Brookins faked a takedown, which fooled Magakian. Brookins was then able to take down Magakian before attempting a standing rear naked choke. Brookins eventually secured the submission at 2:04 of the opening round.

In the quarter-finals, Brookins faced Judo specialist Sako Chivitchian. Brookins was able to throw Chivitchian to the mat, which forced Chivitchian to try to stand up. Brookins then got hooks in and worked for a rear naked choke, eventually sealing it soon after, to advance to the semi-finals.

In the semi-final round, Brookins faced teammate Kyle Watson. In a somewhat lopsided bout, Brookins controlled Watson on the ground to take a 30–27 judges decision. The win moved Brookins into the finals against Michael Johnson.

=== Ultimate Fighting Championship ===
Brookins defeated Michael Johnson at The Ultimate Fighter: Team GSP vs. Team Koscheck Finale. In the first round, Brookins was dominated on the feet by Johnson. However, he pulled through and used his wrestling to edge rounds 2 and 3, taking the unanimous decision to become The Ultimate Fighter.

Brookins was expected to face John Makdessi on April 30, 2011 at UFC 129. However, Brookins was pulled from the bout and replaced by Kyle Watson.

Brookins was expected to face Jeremy Stephens on June 4, 2011 at The Ultimate Fighter 13 Finale. However, Brookins was forced from the bout with an injury and replaced by Danny Downes.

Brookins returned to featherweight for his next fight and faced Erik Koch on September 17, 2011 at UFC Fight Night 25. He lost the fight via unanimous decision.

Brookins was expected to face Rani Yahya on February 15, 2012 at UFC on Fuel TV 1. However, Yahya was forced out of the bout with an injury and replaced by Vagner Rocha. Brookins won via KO in the first round.

Brookins faced Charles Oliveira on June 1, 2012 at The Ultimate Fighter 15 Finale. He lost the fight via submission due to a guillotine choke in the second round.

Brookins next faced Dustin Poirier on December 15, 2012 at The Ultimate Fighter: Team Carwin vs. Team Nelson Finale. He lost the back-and-forth fight via submission in the first round.

On December 21, 2012, Brookins decided to retire from MMA in order to move to India and devote his time to practicing Yoga full-time.

=== Legacy Fighting Championship ===
On January 24, 2014, it was announced that Brookins would return from his retirement to fight for Legacy Fighting Championship. He dropped down to the Flyweight division to make his debut on March 21 at Legacy FC 29 against Cody Fuller. Brookins was victorious in his flyweight debut with a second round submission finish. He then faced Austin Lyons in a bantamweight bout at Legacy FC 34 on August 29, 2014. Brookins lost the fight via unanimous decision.

=== Pancrase ===
Brookins made his Pancrase debut at Pancrase 262 in a non-title fight taking on the Pancrase Bantamweight Champion Shintaro Ishiwatari . He won the fight by unanimous decision.

== Championships and accomplishments ==
- Ultimate Fighting Championship
  - UFC.com Awards
    - 2010: Ranked #8 Newcomer of the Year

== Mixed martial arts record ==
Professional record breakdown
27 matches	16 wins	11 losses
By knockout	5	2
By submission	7	2
By decision	4	7

Res.	Record	Opponent	Method	Event	Date	Round	Time	Location	Notes
Loss	16–11	Ryan MacDonald	TKO (elbows and punches)	Art of Scrap 10	April 11, 2025	3	2:59	Fort Wayne, Indiana, United States	Catchweight (140 lb) bout.
Win	16–10	Decky Dalton	Decision (unanimous)	BAMMA 28	February 24, 2017	3	5:00	Belfast, Northern Ireland	
Loss	15–10	Kyle Nelson	Decision (split)	Z Promotions: Fight Night Medicine Hat 2	October 28, 2016	3	5:00	Medicine Hat, Alberta, Canada	
Loss	15–9	Tom Niinimäki	Decision (unanimous)	Euro FC 1	October 1, 2016	3	5:00	Espoo, Finland	Return to Featherweight.
Loss	15–8	Shintaro Ishiwatari	Decision (unanimous)	Pancrase 279	July 24, 2016	3	5:00	Tokyo, Japan	For the Pancrase Bantamweight Championship.
Win	15–7	Shintaro Ishiwatari	Decision (unanimous)	Pancrase 262	November 1, 2014	3	5:00	Tokyo, Japan	Non-title bout.
Loss	14–7	Austin Lyons	Decision (unanimous)	Legacy FC 34	August 29, 2014	3	5:00	Tunica, Mississippi, United States	Bantamweight debut.
Win	14–6	Cody Fuller	Submission (rear-naked choke)	Legacy FC 29	March 21, 2014	2	3:02	Tulsa, Oklahoma, United States	Flyweight debut.
Loss	13–6	Dustin Poirier	Submission (brabo choke)	The Ultimate Fighter: Team Carwin vs. Team Nelson Finale	December 15, 2012	1	4:15	Las Vegas, Nevada, United States	
Loss	13–5	Charles Oliveira	Submission (guillotine choke)	The Ultimate Fighter: Live Finale	June 1, 2012	2	2:42	Las Vegas, Nevada, United States	
Win	13–4	Vagner Rocha	KO (punches)	UFC on Fuel TV: Sanchez vs. Ellenberger	February 15, 2012	1	1:32	Omaha, Nebraska, United States	
Loss	12–4	Erik Koch	Decision (unanimous)	UFC Fight Night: Shields vs. Ellenberger	September 17, 2011	3	5:00	New Orleans, Louisiana, United States	Return to Featherweight.
Win	12–3	Michael Johnson	Decision (unanimous)	The Ultimate Fighter: Team GSP vs. Team Koscheck Finale	December 4, 2010	3	5:00	Las Vegas, Nevada, United States	Won The Ultimate Fighter 12 Lightweight Tournament.
Win	11–3	Yosdenis Cedeno	Decision (unanimous)	G-Force Fights: Bad Blood 3	February 4, 2010	3	5:00	Miami, Florida, United States	
Win	10–3	Luis Palomino	Submission (rear-naked choke)	G-Force Fights: Bad Blood 2	September 26, 2009	2	1:44	Coral Gables, Florida, United States	Return to Lightweight.
Win	9–3	Stephen Ledbetter	Submission (rear-naked choke)	Bellator 1	April 3, 2009	1	3:32	Hollywood, Florida, United States	
Loss	8–3	José Aldo	TKO (punches)	WEC 36	November 5, 2008	3	0:45	Hollywood, Florida, United States	
Win	8–2	Jose Santibanez	Submission (rear-naked choke)	South Coast Promotions 1	July 18, 2008	1	2:07	Houston, Texas, United States	Featherweight debut.
Loss	7–2	Greg Loughran	Decision (split)	Cage Warriors 32	March 29, 2008	3	5:00	Kissimmee, Florida, United States	
Win	7–1	Jose Figueroa	Submission (guillotine choke)	World Extreme Fighting: King of the Streets	December 1, 2007	1	2:47	Kissimmee, Florida, United States	
Win	6–1	Donald Brook	TKO (submission to punches)	Harmful Intent Promotions 2	November 3, 2007	1	0:35	Estero, Florida, United States	
Win	5–1	Yves Jabouin	TKO (submission to elbows)	Ultimate Warrior Challenge 2	June 30, 2007	2	3:35	Jacksonville, Florida, United States	
Loss	4–1	Harris Sarmiento	Decision (unanimous)	Shakedown 1	May 19, 2007	3	5:00	Maui, Hawaii, United States	
Win	4–0	Sean Bartlett	TKO (punches)	Combat FC 3	February 17, 2007	1	4:05	Orlando, Florida, United States	
Win	3–0	Ryan Nakamura	Submission (rear-naked choke)	Combat FC 2	September 23, 2006	1	1:09	Orlando, Florida, United States	
Win	2–0	York Ash	Submission (guillotine choke)	Full Throttle 8	August 11, 2006	1	3:58	Atlanta, Georgia, United States	
Win	1–0	Allen Berube	KO (punch)	Combat FC 1	July 15, 2006	1	0:19	Orlando, Florida, United States	Lightweight debut.
