= Gene LeBell =

American judoka and martial arts instructor (1932–2022)

- Born: Ivan Gene LeBell; October 9, 1932; Los Angeles, California, U.S.
- Died: August 9, 2022 (aged 89); Sherman Oaks, California, U.S.
- Other names: "Judo Gene" "The Godfather of Grappling"
- Occupations: Actor; martial arts instructor; stunt performer; stunt coordinator
- Martial arts career
- Style: Catch Wrestling, Judo, Jujutsu, Boxing, Jeet Kune Do
- Teacher: Larry Coughran
- Rank: 10th degree red belt in Judo; 9th degree black belt in Jujutsu; 10th degree black belt in Kyokushin Budokai

Other information
- Notable students: Chuck Norris; Benny Urquidez; Bill Wallace; Gokor Chivichyan; Karo Parisyan; Neil Melanson; Robert Wall; Ed Parker; Manny Gamburyan; Ronda Rousey; Tony Halme; Roddy Piper
- Professional wrestling career
- Ring names: Gene LeBell; The Hangman
- Billed height: 5 ft 10 in (178 cm)
- Trained by: Ed "Strangler" Lewis; Lou Thesz; Karl Gotch
- Debut: December 10, 1955
- Retired: August 29, 1980

Ivan Gene LeBell (October 9, 1932 – August 9, 2022) was an American actor, judoka, stuntman and professional wrestler. Nicknamed "Judo Gene" and "The Godfather of Grappling", he is credited with popularizing grappling in professional fighting circles, serving as a precursor to modern mixed martial arts. He worked on over 1,000 films and TV shows and authored 12 books.

== Early life ==
Ivan Gene LeBell was born in Los Angeles, California. He started training in catch wrestling and boxing from his early childhood, influenced by his mother, "Red Head" Aileen Eaton, a promoter of both sports who owned the Olympic Auditorium in Los Angeles, and who was the first woman to be inducted into the International Boxing Hall of Fame. LeBell took up catch wrestling under Ed "Strangler" Lewis at age 7, and later moved to train in judo. After getting his black belt, he went to Japan to train in judo at the Kodokan.

== Career ==
=== Early career ===
After returning to the United States, LeBell competed as a heavyweight. In 1954 and 1955, while only 22 years of age, he captured both the heavyweight and overall Amateur Athletic Union National Judo Championships. His very first match was against John Osako, one of the highest ranked judokas at the national level. LeBell earned the upset win via an osaekomi. Afterward, attracted by better potential earnings and the family's legacy in the business, LeBell transitioned to professional wrestling. Despite his pedigree, he did not get over immediately with audiences but gradually became known for his martial arts background. He eventually adopted the role as "policeman" for the promotion, maintaining law and order, especially during matches involving his brother Mike LeBell. Gene also wrestled under a black mask as The Hangman, teaming up with Roy Staggs.

=== Milo Savage match ===
In 1963, LeBell became involved with a challenge by boxer and writer Jim Beck to the practitioners of Japanese martial arts. Beck claimed that a boxer could defeat any martial artist in a straight fight and offered $1000 to anyone who could prove otherwise. Beck engaged in abundant trash-talk, but revealed a very limited knowledge of martial arts, seemingly mistaking judo for karate.

Encouraged by Ed Parker, LeBell accepted the challenge and travelled to Salt Lake City to meet Beck. To his surprise, he learned his opponent would not be Beck but another boxer, journeyman Milo Savage, who LeBell claimed also had a background in amateur wrestling. An agreement was reached for the match to last five rounds, each lasting three minutes. The boxer's side demanded a stipulation in which the smaller and older Savage (Savage was 39 while LeBell was 31 at the date of the fight) could use any type of punch, while the judoka could not kick, in the apparent belief LeBell was a karateka. An additional stipulation prevented LeBell from attempting tackles or takedowns under the waist. In return, Savage offered to wear a judogi. On the day of the match, Savage appeared wearing a karategi instead, much tighter and harder to grab. The Savage camp claimed they did not know the difference. According to LeBell and other sources, Savage's gloves allegedly contained brass knuckles and his gi was greased with vaseline to make gripping it more difficult. The unusual stipulations convinced LeBell the Savage camp, far from being ignorant about martial arts, had trained Savage in judo in order to defend against LeBell's throws.

The match took place on December 2, 1963. The combatants were initially cautious, with LeBell being the first in pressing the action by attempting to throw Savage down. The boxer blocked the move, which LeBell claimed aggravated an old shoulder injury. LeBell tried several techniques through the second and third rounds and was finally successful in taking Savage down, but Savage kept defending both standing and on the ground in a very technical manner, seemingly confirming LeBell's theory about his opponent's grappling training. Savage even attempted to sweep the judoka in one instance. Nevertheless, LeBell got mount and found the opportunity to execute an armbar, but he opted instead to seek a choke, concluding that Savage would not surrender to a broken arm. Finally, he performed a left harai goshi in the fourth round and followed by locking a rear naked choke. Within seconds, Savage fell unconscious and LeBell was declared the winner.

The loss by Savage, the hometown favorite, caused the crowd to react violently. Bottles, chairs, and other debris were thrown into the ring. To prevent a full-blown riot, hometown hero and rated professional boxer Jay Fullmer (brother of boxers Gene and Don Fullmer) entered the ring to congratulate LeBell. According to 1999 interview with LeBell, the judoka and his team showed their sportsmanship by helping to revive Savage using kappo, as neither the referee nor the ring doctor knew how to resuscitate him. Despite this, LeBell claims that a man tried to stab him on the way out and the latter had to be protected by the judokas and professional wrestlers who accompanied him.

Dewey Lewes Falcone, who attended the event and wrote a round-by-round recap for Black Belt magazine, made no mention of either of these events as claimed by LeBell. As noted by Black Belt, in a write-up about LeBell following his death in 2022 that briefly covered the event, he was known to fabricate stories regarding his exploits.

=== After retiring ===
Following his combat sports career, LeBell, along with his brother Mike, ran the National Wrestling Alliance's Los Angeles territory, NWA Hollywood Wrestling, from 1968 to 1982. In June 1976, LeBell refereed the infamous boxing-versus-wrestling contest between Muhammad Ali and Antonio Inoki in Tokyo, Japan. LeBell was selected from over 200 other applicants to referee the bout. He also continued to work in professional wrestling intermittently, wrestling his final match on August 29, 1981, against Peter Maivia for NWA Hollywood Wrestling.

LeBell has opened two martial art schools in cooperation with others and has touted his 1963 match with Milo Savage as the first televised MMA fight in America.

In 1994, LeBell counted kickboxing champion Benny Urquidez and Brazilian jiu-jitsu practitioners the Machado brothers among his training partners. According to fellow BJJ artist Royce Gracie, LeBell was invited to compete in Ultimate Fighting Championship in early 1995, after Gracie stopped participating in its tournaments. Being 63 years old, LeBell declined to compete or to send a representative, instead suggesting a match against Royce's 82-year-old father, the renowned Hélio Gracie. The latter then accepted, but only if LeBell could drop 100 pounds to reach his weight, otherwise he would have to face Royce's brothers, similarly 20 years younger than LeBell though still lighter than him. Ultimately, nothing came from it.

Along with the awards received for feats in judo and grappling, LeBell was the 2005 recipient of the Frank Gotch Award in celebration of the positive recognition he brought to the sport of wrestling. The Cauliflower Alley Club presented the award. On March 18, 1995, the Cauliflower Alley Club again honored LeBell by presenting him with the "Iron Mike Mazurki" award; presented by one of his teachers, legendary professional wrestling champion Lou Thesz.

In 2000, the United States Ju-Jitsu Federation (USJJF) promoted LeBell to 9th dan in jujitsu and taihojutsu. On August 7, 2004, the World Martial Arts Masters Association promoted him to 10th degree. In February 2005, the USJJF made him 9th dan in judo.

=== Television and film work ===
LeBell worked on over 1,000 films, TV shows and commercials as a stuntman or as an actor (including multiple appearances as himself). LeBell appeared in three Elvis Presley movies as a minor character who starts a fight with the character played by Presley. In addition he also worked on the set of the Green Hornet TV show, in which he developed a friendship with Bruce Lee. LeBell was especially interested in exploring grappling with help from him and exchanged ideas on various fighting techniques. However, there is no verifiable evidence that Lee exchanged ideas with LeBell since no one else has corroborated the latter's story. He would also guest star on a 1964 episode of The Munsters as professional wrestler "Tarzan McGirk."

LeBell also appeared in "The World of Martial Arts – Budojujitsu". This 1982 homevideo production, introduced by Chuck Norris and narrated by John Saxon, featured LeBell as a car thief and mugger who (in the prologue) accosts Mitsuru Yamashita and Budojujitsu creator Al Thomas...much to LeBell's regret. The program featured several other martial artists including Graciela Casilas, Karen Sheperd, Victor Ledbetter, Steve Sanders, brothers Benny and Reuben Urquidez, and Dave Vaden.

On March 23, 1991, LeBell was awarded the Honorary "Reel" Membership by the Ring of Friendship of the Cauliflower Alley Club. This award is only given to a select few. Others awarded have been James Cagney, Kirk Douglas, Karl Malden, Cesar Romero and Mickey Rooney (movie stars that also did boxing and wrestling).

LeBell has been reported as the inspiration for the character of Cliff Booth (Brad Pitt) in Quentin Tarantino's Once Upon a Time in Hollywood. However, Tarantino disputes this claim.

=== Conflict with Steven Seagal ===
While serving as stunt coordinator for the film Out for Justice, starring Steven Seagal, Seagal stated that due to his aikido training he was 'immune' to being choked unconscious. It has been alleged that at some point LeBell heard about the claim and gave Seagal the opportunity to prove it. LeBell is said to have placed his arms around Seagal's neck, and once Seagal said "go", proceeded to choke him unconscious, with Seagal losing control of his bowels.

The popularity of this story led LeBell to be counted in 1992 as a potential additional member of Robert Wall's controversial "Dirty Dozen," a group of martial artists willing to answer to a public challenge made by Seagal.

LeBell was requested to confirm the story publicly in an interview with Ariel Helwani in 2012, but he avoided answering the question, albeit implying that the incident was true. He was quoted as saying: "When we had a little altercation or difference of opinion, there were thirty stuntmen and cameramen that were watching. Sometimes Steven has a tendency to cheese off the wrong people, and you can get hurt doing that." After being asked whether he was not going to directly confirm it, LeBell said: "Well, if thirty people are watching, let them talk about it."

When Seagal was asked about the incident, he denied the incident took place, calling LeBell a "sick, pathological scumbag liar" and offered the name of a witness who could discredit the other account.

Seagal bodyguard and stuntman Steven Lambert, stated he was present and said that a confrontation did happen. According to Lambert, Seagal explained to LeBell that he did not believe his choke hold was effective, and that he could escape from it. LeBell demonstrated the choke hold by putting it on Seagal. Before LeBell could lock the hold, however, Seagal side stepped and swung his forearm backward into his crotch. LeBell came off the floor by a few feet. As soon as he landed, LeBell used a foot sweep to sweep Seagal off the floor, with Seagal landing on his back. LeBell helped Seagal up.

=== Teaching ===
LeBell earned himself the nicknames "Judo" Gene LeBell, "the Godfather of Grappling" and also "the toughest man alive" for his participation in combat sports. In addition to his judo background, LeBell had an extensive background in submission grappling and catch wrestling, and trained under Lou Thesz, Karl Gotch and Ed "Strangler" Lewis. He trained with or taught grappling skills to many well-known wrestlers and martial artists, such as Benny "The Jet" Urquidez, Bob Wall, Chuck Norris, Ed Parker, Gokor Chivichyan, Karo Parisyan, "Rowdy" Roddy Piper, Mando Guerrero, Manny Gamburyan.

The pink colored judo gi became a trademark of LeBell and was a result of a laundry mixup while preparing for a competition in Japan. A pair of red shorts was mixed into the laundry that contained his Gi and turned the uniform a shade of pink. He was set to compete the following day and being a Saturday evening when he received the now colored uniform, he had to compete in the pink uniform. This angered the Japanese crowd livid, as it was considered insulting, but they somewhat calmed down after LeBell went on to win his division.

LeBell is associated with Gokor Chivichyan's Hayastan MMA Academy where he taught grappling classes. He also did interviews for magazines, newspapers, and radio. LeBell judged fights for several decades, but retired from it after Golden Boy Promotions: Liddell vs. Ortiz 3 on November 24, 2018.

LeBell was friends with world champion judoka AnnMaria De Mars, and had known her daughter, Olympic judoka, mixed martial artist and professional wrestler Ronda Rousey since her birth. He was seen in Rousey's corner during matches and celebrated her victories with her.

== Legal issues ==
LeBell was arrested, charged with, and tried for the July 1976 murder of private investigator Robert Duke Hall. He was acquitted of the murder charge but convicted as an accessory for driving the convicted murderer, pornographer Jack Ginsburgs, to and from the murder scene. LeBell's conviction for being an accessory was later overturned by the California Courts of Appeal.

LeBell and Ginsburgs were former friends and business partners of Hall. Inside Hall's residence police discovered hours of wire-tapped recordings, some of which led to the resignation of the Beverly Hills police department chief of police. Other recordings discovered had ties to the presidential campaign of Richard Nixon.

== Death ==
On August 9, 2022, LeBell died in his sleep.

== Works ==
LeBell authored at least twelve books, including:

- The Handbook of Judo: An Illustrated Step-by-Step Guide to Winning Sport Judo by Gene LeBell and Lauri C. Coughran. 1962, 1963, 1969, 1971, 1975, 1996.
- Your Personal Handbook of Self-defense by Gene LeBell. 1964, 1976.
- Judo and Self-defense for the Young Adult by Gene LeBell. 1971.
- Pro-Wrestling Finishing Holds by "Judo" Gene LeBell. 1985, 1990.
- Grappling Master: Combat for Street Defense and Competition by Gene LeBell. 1992.
- Gene LeBell's Handbook of Self-Defense by Gene LeBell. 1996.
- Gene LeBell – The Grappling Club Master by Gene LeBell, Ben Springer, and Steve Kim. 1999.
- Grappling and Self-Defense for the Young Adult by Gene LeBell and Bob Ryder. 2002.
- How to Break Into Pro Wrestling: "Judo" Gene LeBell's Insider Guide to the Biz by Gene Lebell and Mark Jacobs. 2003.
- Gene LeBell's Grappling World: The Encyclopedia of Finishing Holds by Gene LeBell. 1998, 2000(2nd expanded edition), 2005(3rd edition).
- The Godfather of Grappling (authorised biography of LeBell) by "Judo" Gene LeBell, Bob Calhoun, George Foon, and Noelle Kim. 2005.

== Championships and accomplishments ==
=== Judo ===
- Amateur Athletic Union
  - AAU National Judo Championship (1954)
  - AAU National Judo Championship (1955)

=== Professional wrestling ===
- 50th State Big Time Wrestling
  - NWA Hawaii Heavyweight Championship (1 time)
- Cauliflower Alley Club
  - Iron Mike Mazurki Award (1995)
- Central States Wrestling
  - NWA Central States Heavyweight Championship (1 time)
- George Tragos/Lou Thesz Professional Wrestling Hall of Fame
  - Frank Gotch Award (2005)
- International Professional Wrestling Hall of Fame
  - Class of 2026 (Trailblazer Award)
- National Wrestling Alliance
  - NWA World Heavyweight Championship (1 time, unrecognized)
  - NWA Hall of Fame (Class of 2011)
- NWA Hollywood Wrestling
  - NWA Americas Tag Team Championship (1 time) – with Chino Chou
  - NWA "Beat the Champ" Television Championship (1 time)
- Western States Sports
  - NWA North American Heavyweight Championship (Amarillo version) (1 time)
- Wrestling Observer Newsletter
  - Most Obnoxious (1981)

== Mixed martial arts record ==
Professional record breakdown
1 match	1 win	0 losses
By submission	1	0

Res.	Record	Opponent	Method	Event	Date	Round	Time	Location	Notes
Win	1–0	Milo Savage	Technical Submission (rear naked choke)	Independent Event	December 2, 1963	4	n/a	Salt Lake City, Utah, United States	

== Books ==
- Corcoran, John; Emil Farkas (1983). Martial Arts: Traditions, History, People. Gallery Books. ISBN 0-8317-5805-8.
