= Mestarit salilla =

Studio album by Tony Halme
- Released: July 2001
- Genres: Pop, rock, techno
- Label: Edel

Mestarit salilla is the first and only album by former boxer, professional wrestler and Finnish parliament member, Tony Halme. Four singles were released from this album: Viikinki (1999), Mä oon tällainen (2000), Painu pelle hiiteen (2001) and Kuningas voittamaton (2001), the first of which was certified gold in Finland.

== Track listing ==
1. Viikinki
2. Mä oon tällainen
3. Painu pelle hiiteen
4. Kuningas voittamaton
5. Fysiikkaa
6. Jos jotain yrittää
7. Tony, missä sä oot
8. Läähätän ja läkähdyn
9. Turpa kii!
10. Tahdon olla sulle hellä (feat. Veronica)
11. Jos sä tartut mun hanuriin
12. Samurai
13. Alibi
14. Nukkumatti
