= Neil Melanson =

Grappling coach

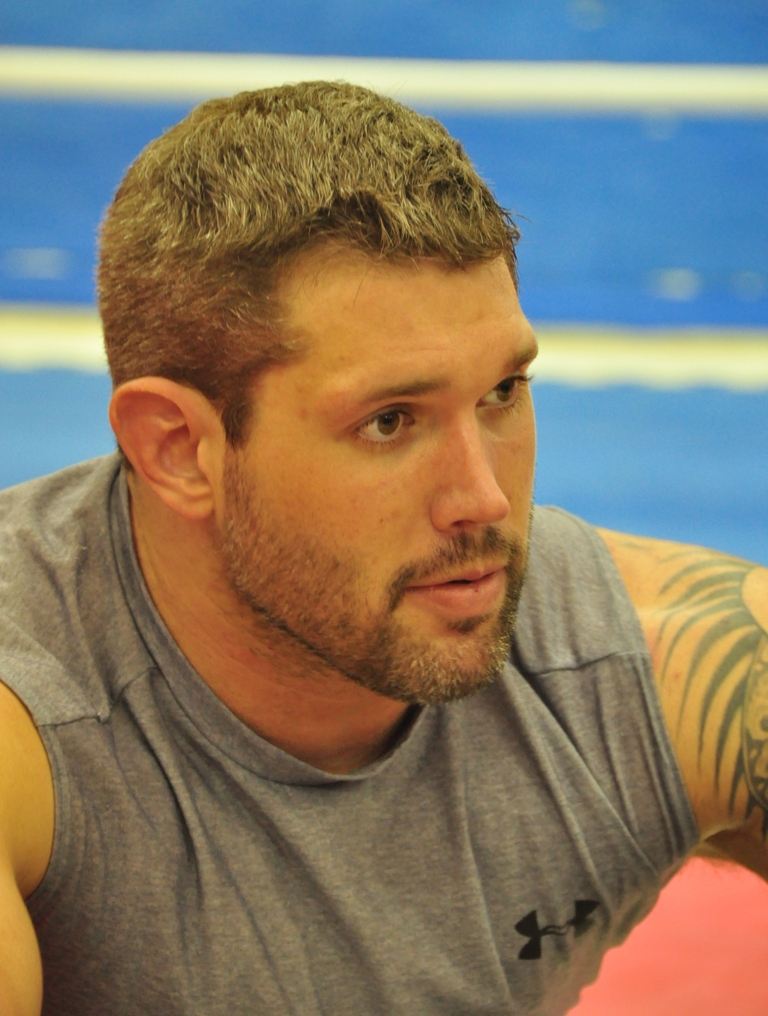
- Style: Catch Wrestling, Judo
- Team: Hayastan Studio, Xtreme Couture Mixed Martial Arts
- Teachers: Gokor Chivichyan, Gene LeBell, Karo Parisyan
- Rank: Black belt in Hayastan wrestling

Other information
- Notable students: Dominick Cruz, Vitor Belfort, Randy Couture, Todd Duffee, Gray Maynard, Karo Parisyan, Goran Reljic, Chael Sonnen, Michael Chandler

Neil Melanson is an American submission grappling coach. Melanson specializes in catch wrestling, while drawing elements from judo, and focuses his coaching specifically, but not exclusively, on grappling in mixed martial arts. He is especially known for his guard work, leg locks and triangle chokes. He is currently the head grappling coach at Jaco Hybrid Training Center. He is the former head grappling coach at both Xtreme Couture Las Vegas, Blackzilians and Alliance MMA.

Melanson's hybrid grappling style comes from his training under Gene LeBell, Gokor Chivichyan, and Karo Parisyan (who awarded him his black belt) at the Hayastan MMA Academy. Gene LeBell learned catch wrestling from feared wrestlers Lou Thesz and Ed "Strangler" Lewis, which is mixed with Gokor Chivichyan's expertise in judo and sambo. Melanson considers this unique style a massive influence on his grappling, and has since incorporated techniques from Brazilian jiu-jitsu, Greco-Roman and freestyle wrestling into his own style.

Throughout his career, the professional fighters Melanson has trained include: Randy Couture, Karo Parisyan, Gray Maynard, Todd Duffee, Goran Reljic, Chael Sonnen, Vitor Belfort, Anthony Johnson, Patrick Cummins, Michael Chandler and also professional wrestler Bryan Danielson.

Melanson spent seven years in the United States Navy and five years as a Special Agent for the Federal Air Marshals, before joining Xtreme Couture and later Blackzilians.

Melanson's book "Mastering Triangle Chokes: Ground Marshal Submission Grappling" was released by Victory Belt Publishing. The book serves as a complete guide to the physiology and science of triangle submissions.

== Personal life ==
Melanson was born with Behçet's disease which caused him to go blind at the age of 28. With the help of doctors and Remicade infusions, he regained sight but only in his right eye. After experiencing trouble with a toe in 2011, Melanson had it removed after it became arthritic due repeated injuries so that he could continue training.
