= 2021 NBA G League draft (October) =

General information
- Sport: Basketball
- Date: October 23, 2021
- Location: Zoom

Overview
- League: NBA
- First selection: Shamorie Ponds, Delaware Blue Coats

The October 2021 NBA G League draft was the 21st draft of the NBA G League.

The Delaware Blue Coats had the first overall selection after a three-team trade involving the South Bay Lakers and Memphis Hustle. The Blue Coats selected Shamorie Ponds with the first pick.

== Key ==
| Pos. | G | F | C |
| Position | Guard | Forward | Center |

| ^ | Denotes player who has been selected to (an) NBA G League International Challenge Teams(s) |
| * | Denotes player who has been selected to (an) NBA G League International Challenge Team(s) and was also selected in an NBA draft |
| † | Denotes player who was also selected in an NBA Draft |

== Draft ==
=== First round ===
| Pick | Player | Pos. | Nationality | Team | College/country |
|---|---|---|---|---|---|
| 1 | Shamorie Ponds | G | United States | Delaware Blue Coats (from South Bay) | St. John's |
| 2 | Tyler Hagedorn | F | United States | College Park Skyhawks | South Dakota |
| 3 | Gabe York | G | United States | Fort Wayne Mad Ants | Arizona |
| 4 | Justin Turner | G | United States | Westchester Knicks | Bowling Green |
| 5 | Nate Darling | G | Canada | Agua Caliente Clippers (from Stockton) | Delaware |
| 6 | Brandon Knight† | G | United States | Sioux Falls Skyforce (from Grand Rapids) | Kentucky |
| 7 | Eddie Stansberry | G | United States | Texas Legends (from Raptors 905) | Hawaii |
| 8 | Jaylen Johnson | F | United States | Motor City Cruise | Louisville |
| 9 | Michael Gbinije† | G/F | United States | Iowa Wolves (from Wisconsin) | Syracuse |
| 10 | Zaire Wade | G | United States | Salt Lake City Stars | USA |
| 11 | Loudon Love | C | United States | Texas Legends (from Austin) | Wright State |
| 12 | Alan Griffin | G/F | United States | Santa Cruz Warriors (from Memphis) | Syracuse |
| 13 | Lance Stephenson† | G | United States | Grand Rapids Gold | Cincinnati |
| 14 | LiAngelo Ball | G | United States | Greensboro Swarm | USA |
| 15 | T. J. Haws | G | United States | Lakeland Magic | BYU |
| 16 | B. J. Taylor | G | United States | Cleveland Charge | Central Florida |
| 17 | Scottie Lindsey | G | United States | Windy City Bulls | Northwestern |
| 18 | Isaiah Ross | G | United States | Maine Celtics (from Birmingham) | Iona |
| 19 | Ruot Monyyong | F | United States | Iowa Wolves | Little Rock |
| 20 | Marlon Stewart | G | United States | Lakeland Magic | North Dakota |
| 21 | Joe Young† | G | United States | Birmingham Squadron (from Stockton) | Oregon |
| 22 | Samir Doughty | G | United States | Iowa Wolves | Auburn |
| 23 | Chudier Bile | F | United States | Greensboro Swarm | Georgetown |
| 24 | Rodney Pryor | F | United States | Capital City Go-Go | Georgetown |
| 25 | Tim Bond | G | United States | Windy City Bulls | Eastern Michigan |
| 26 | Tyree White | F | United States | Greensboro Swarm | Louisiana-Monroe |
| 27 | Montell McRae | F/C | United States | Cleveland Charge (from Oklahoma via Rio Grande) | Buffalo |
| 28 | Cullen Russo | F | United States | Maine Celtics (from Rio Grande) | Fresno State |

=== Second round ===
| Pick | Player | Pos. | Nationality | Team | College/country |
|---|---|---|---|---|---|
| 1 | Karim Mané | G | Canada | Memphis Hustle (from South Bay) | Vanier |
| 2 | Kalob Ledoux | G | United States | College Park Skyhawks | Louisiana Tech |
| 3 | Gerard Tarin | G | United States | Memphis Hustle (from Fort Wayne) | Nova Southeastern |
| 4 | Barra Njie^ | G | Sweden | Delaware Blue Coats (from Westchester) | Sweden |
| 5 | Tahj Eaddy | G | United States | Raptors 905 (from Stockton via Cleveland and Rio Grande Valley) | USC |
| 6 | Trevon Duval | G | United States | Grand Rapids Gold | Duke |
| 7 | Gary Chivichyan | G | Armenia | Lakeland Magic (from Raptors 905) | Pacific |
| 8 | Ryan Daly | G/F | United States | Motor City Cruise | Saint Joseph's |
| 9 | Keaton Wallace | G | United States | Wisconsin Herd | UTSA |
| 10 | Pedro Bradshaw | G | United States | Salt Lake City Stars (via Stockton) | Bellarmine |
| 11 | Alexis Wangmene | F | Cameroon | Austin Spurs | Texas |
| 12 | Ian DuBose | G | United States | Fort Wayne Mad Ants (from Memphis) | Wake Forest |
| 13 | Mike Smith | G | United States | Sioux Falls Skyforce | Michigan |
| 14 | Jaire Grayer | G | United States | Lakeland Magic (from Delaware) | TCU |
| 15 | Blake Francis | G | United States | Raptors 905 (from Texas) | Richmond |
| 16 | Jack Pagenkopf | G | United States | Cleveland Charge | Dixie State |
| 17 | Devonte Patterson | F | United States | Iowa Wolves | Prairie View A&M |
| 18 | Jordan Allen | F | United States | Fort Wayne Mad Ants (from Maine via Lakeland) | Lynn |
| 19 | Devearl Ramsey | G | United States | Birmingham Squadron | UC Santa Barbara |
| 20 | Chris Walker | F | United States | Long Island Nets | Florida |
| 21 | Eric Demers | G | United States | Rio Grande Valley Vipers (from Agua Caliente) | Gordon (MA) |
| 22 | Derrick Griffin | F | United States | Birmingham Squadron (from Iowa) | Texas Southern |
| 23 | JaQuan Lyle | G | United States | Santa Cruz Warriors | New Mexico |
| 24 | Jachai Taylor | G | United States | Capital City Go-Go | Queens (NC) |
| 25 | Lydell Elmore | F | United States | Westchester Knicks (from Windy City) | High Point |
| 26 | Ikenna Ndugba | G | Nigeria | Greensboro Swarm | Elon |
| 27 | Tevin King | G | United States | Oklahoma City Blue | South Dakota State |
| 28 | Kammeon Holsey | F | United States | Agua Caliente Clippers (from Rio Grande Valley) | Georgia Tech |

=== Third round ===
| Pick | Player | Pos. | Nationality | Team | College/country |
|---|---|---|---|---|---|
| 1 | Elijah Cain | G | United States | South Bay Lakers | DePaul |
| 2 | Landon Taliaferro | G | United States | College Park Skyhawks | Fairfield |
| 3 | Will Vorhees | F | United States | Fort Wayne Mad Ants | Notre Dame (OH) |
| 4 | Asante Gist | G | United States | Westchester Knicks | Iona |
| 5 | Princepal Singh | F/C | India | Stockton Kings | India |
| 6 | Trevor John | G | United States | Grand Rapids Gold | Drexel |
| 7 | Tristan Jarrett | G | United States | Raptors 905 | Jackson State |
| 8 | Devon Baulkman | G | United States | Motor City Cruise | Tennessee |
| 9 | Jaylen Bland | G | United States | Wisconsin Herd | UC Riverside |
| 10 | J. C. Show | G | United States | Salt Lake City Stars | Binghamton |
| — | — | | — | Austin Spurs | — |
| — | — | | — | Memphis Hustle | — |
| 11 | Joel Ntambwe | F | DR Congo | Sioux Falls Skyforce | Texas Tech |
| — | — | | — | Delaware Blue Coats | — |
| 12 | Lamonte Bearden | G | United States | Texas Legends | Western Kentucky |
| — | — | | — | Stockton Kings (from Cleveland) | — |
| — | — | | — | Delaware Blue Coats (from Lakeland) | — |
| 13 | Lindsey Drew | G | United States | Maine Celtics | Nevada |
| 14 | Artur Labinowicz | G | Poland | Iowa Wolves (from Birmingham) | Evansville |
| 15 | Jaylen Fisher | G | United States | Long Island Nets | TCU |
| 16 | Randy Onwuasor | G | United States | Agua Caliente Clippers | LSU |
| 17 | Seth Allen | G | United States | Iowa Wolves | Virginia Tech |
| 18 | Jovan Mooring | G | United States | Santa Cruz Warriors | Nevada |
| 19 | Jermaine Haley | G | Canada | Capital City Go-Go | West Virginia |
| 20 | Kerwin Roach | G | United States | Windy City Bulls | Texas |
| 21 | Isaiah Blackmon | G | United States | Greensboro Swarm | Saint Francis (PA) |
| 22 | Marlon Taylor | G | United States | Oklahoma City Blue | LSU |
| 23 | Jimond Ivey | G | United States | Rio Grande Valley Vipers | Akron |
