= The Ultimate Fighter: Team GSP vs. Team Koscheck =

UFC mixed martial arts television series and event in 2010

- Genre: Reality, Sports
- Created by: Frank Fertitta III, Lorenzo Fertitta, Dana White
- Starring: Dana White, Georges St-Pierre, Josh Koscheck
- Country of origin: United States

Production
- Running time: 60 minutes

Original release
- Network: Spike
- Release: September 15, 2010

The Ultimate Fighter: Team GSP vs. Team Koscheck is the twelfth installment of the Ultimate Fighting Championship produced reality television series The Ultimate Fighter.

The UFC and Spike TV held open tryouts on April 1, 2010, in Charlotte, North Carolina. The casting call went out for Lightweight and Light Heavyweight fighters. All fighters applying and trying out for the show needed to have at least three professional fights and be at least 21 years of age. Some of the fighters that showed up for the auditions included former TUF contestant Jason Guida and Pride veteran Charles Bennett.

It was confirmed at the UFC 113 Q&A that the winner of the Josh Koscheck and Paul Daley bout at UFC 113 would coach against Georges St-Pierre and also fight for the Welterweight Championship that St-Pierre currently holds. Koscheck eventually won the fight to coach opposite St-Pierre.

Originally this season was to have lightweights and light heavyweights, but it was confirmed that it will only have Lightweights.

Production began on June 7, 2010 and the season once again features 28 competitors, with the wildcard slot available, which debuted in the eleventh season.

== Cast ==
=== Coaches ===
Team GSP

- Georges St-Pierre
- Greg Jackson
- Phil Nurse
- Freddie Roach
- Firas Zahabi
- Howard Grant
- John Danaher
- Shawn Williams
- Jean-Charles Skarbowsky
- Kristof Midoux
- Cleopas Ncube
- Gia Sissaouri

Team Koscheck

- Josh Koscheck
- Jon Fitch
- Chuck Liddell
- Javier Mendez
- Bob Cook
- Dave Camarillo
- Teddy Lucio
- Daniel Cormier

=== Fighters ===
- Team Koscheck

- Marc Stevens, Sevak Magakian, Sako Chivitchian, Andy Main, Nam Phan, Aaron Wilkinson, Jeff Lentz

- Team GSP

- Michael Johnson, Jonathan Brookins, Spencer Paige, Alex Caceres, Kyle Watson, Cody McKenzie, Dane Sayers

- Fighters eliminated before entry round

- J.J. Ambrose, Paul Barrow, Jason Brenton, Mike Budnik, Joseph Duffy, Pablo Garza, Toby Grear, Daniel Head, Amir Khillah, Steve Magdaleno, TJ O'Brien, Mike Richman, Ariel Sexton, Ran Weathers

== Episodes ==
Episode 1: Go For It

- Dana White welcomed 28 fighters to the UFC training facility and announced that like the eleventh season, only 14 would get to go to the TUF house. He also announced the return of the wildcard format.
- The 28 fighters then fought to determine who would go to the TUF house. Elimination round matches were for two rounds. If there was a draw after two rounds, a third round would be fought.
- Marc Stevens defeated TJ O'Brien by KO (punches) at 0:13 of the first round.
- Spencer Paige defeated Steve Magdaleno by unanimous decision (20–18, 20–18, 20–18).
- Nam Phan defeated Mike Budnik by TKO (liver strike and punches) in the first round.
- Andy Main defeated Jason Brenton by submission (triangle armbar) at 3:33 of the first round.
- Jonathan Brookins defeated Ran Weathers by unanimous decision (20–18, 20–18, 20–18).
- Sako Chivitchian defeated Toby Grear by unanimous decision (20–18, 20–18, 20–18).
- Jeff Lentz defeated Daniel Head by submission (rear naked choke) at 3:45 of the second round.
- Alex Caceres defeated Paul Barrow by submission (rear naked choke) at 3:55 of the first round.
- Michael Johnson defeated Pablo Garza by unanimous decision (20–18, 20–18, 20–18).
- Aaron Wilkinson defeated Mike Richman by unanimous decision (20–18, 20–18, 20–18).
- Kyle Watson defeated Joseph Duffy by submission (rear naked choke) at 3:33 of the first round.
- Sevak Magakian defeated JJ Ambrose by unanimous decision (20–18, 20–18, 20–18).
- Cody McKenzie defeated Amir Khillah by technical submission (guillotine choke) at 2:15 of the first round.
- Dane Sayers defeated Ariel Sexton by submission (standing rear naked choke) in the second round.

Episode 2: Well Played

- The fighters moved into the new house and immediately, Lentz' smoking and drinking came into focus, with some fighters questioning his cardio as a result.
- The coin toss (red for GSP, yellow for Koscheck) was won by Josh Koscheck, who chose to pick the first fighter.
- Georges St-Pierre hatched a plan to manipulate Koscheck into picking Marc Stevens as the top overall pick, so that his could make Johnson his own first pick. The plan seemingly worked as St-Pierre's wish came to fruition.

Coach	1st Pick	2nd Pick	3rd Pick	4th Pick	5th Pick	6th Pick	7th Pick
Koscheck	Marc Stevens	Sevak Magakian	Sako Chivitchian	Andy Main	Nam Phan	Aaron Wilkinson	Jeff Lentz
GSP	Michael Johnson	Jonathan Brookins	Spencer Paige	Alex Caceres	Kyle Watson	Cody McKenzie	Dane Sayers

- Caceres explains how his love of Bruce Lee led to him pursuing a career in martial arts.
- St-Pierre picked Caceres to face Lentz, who trained under Kurt Pellegrino.
- Alex Caceres defeated Jeff Lentz by submission (triangle choke) at 2:27 of the second round.

Episode 3: Unleash Hell

- Alex Caceres celebrated his victory by getting drunk, but his attitude when drunk was mocked.
- Olympic silver medalist wrestler Gia Sissaouri trained with the red team.
- St-Pierre picked Johnson to face Wilkinson.
- Former heavyweight boxing champion Mike Tyson visited The Ultimate Fighter gym, to see Team GSP.
- Michael Johnson defeated Aaron Wilkinson by submission (rear naked choke) at 0:37 of the third round.
- Tyson later claimed that Johnson's speed won the fight, as Wilkinson was the better boxer. Koscheck also claimed that the fight should not have gone to third round, as he believed that Wilkinson had done enough to win the first two.

Episode 4: Love to Hate

- Tyson talked with Team GSP about his attitude toward fighting and how to win.
- Sevak Magakian and Alex Caceres got into a heated argument and nearly fought at the fighter house. However, they were separated by their fellow fighters before any punches were thrown.
- St-Pierre announced the next fight: Watson against Main
- Kyle Watson defeated Andy Main by submission with a rear-naked choke in the second round.

Episode 5: Disrespectful

- Jon Fitch arrived at the training center to train with the yellow team.
- Jean-Charles Skarbowsky also arrived, intoxicated and following a 14-hour flight from Paris, to train Muay Thai with Team GSP.
- Chuck Liddell also arrived and shared some words of wisdom with Team Koscheck
- Alex Caceres annoyed teammate Michael Johnson by putting bleach into Nam Phan's fabric conditioner – the very same used by Johnson.
- St-Pierre matched Paige against Phan.
- Nam Phan defeated Spencer Paige by decision after two rounds.
- Paige suffered a broken hand in the fight.

Episode 6: Win or Die

- Koscheck annoyed Michael Johnson by calling him out-of-shape and interrupting him during stretches. The yellow team further compounded frustration after celebrating loudly.
- McKenzie continued to joke around with Koscheck, which annoyed him.
- Koscheck announced the next fight Stevens against McKenzie
- Cody McKenzie defeated Marc Stevens by technical submission (guillotine choke) at 0:17 of the first round.
- St-Pierre matched Brookins against Magakian
- Jonathan Brookins defeated Sevak Magakian via submission (rear naked choke) at 2:04 of the first round.

Episode 7: Second Chance

- Koscheck defeated St-Pierre in a baseball home run derby to win the Coaches' Challenge.
- Sako Chivitchian defeated Dane Sayers by unanimous decision (20–18, 20–18, 20–18) after two rounds.
- The wildcards were announced as Aaron Wilkinson and Marc Stevens.

Episode 8: Kos in a Commotion

- Cleopas Ncube is introduced by St-Pierre.
- Koscheck got into a physical confrontation with Team GSP paramedic Brad Tate.
- Wilkinson received a phone call from his mother, who informed him his grandmother had died.
- Aaron Wilkinson defeated Marc Stevens by submission (guillotine choke) at 0:47 of the second round.
- White and the coaches called in each fighter to ask which opponent they preferred to face. Every fighter stated their interest in facing Caceres.
- The quarterfinal fights were announced:

- Jonathan Brookins vs. Sako Chivitchian
- Cody McKenzie vs Nam Phan
- Kyle Watson vs. Aaron Wilkinson
- Michael Johnson vs. Alex Caceres

Episode 9: Personal

- Jonathan Brookins defeated Sako Chivitchian by submission (rear naked choke) at 2:05 of the first round.
- Nam Phan defeated Cody McKenzie by TKO (punches) at 2:54 of the second round.
- After Phan's win, Koscheck stormed the Octagon, screaming and yelling to celebrate the win.
- St-Pierre notes that Koscheck is blatantly and obnoxiously celebrating to get under his skin. He admits that Koscheck got under his skin and says it will motivate him that much more in preparing for the coaches' fight.

Episode 10: Spinning Tornado

- Kyle Watson defeated Aaron Wilkinson by submission (rear naked choke) at 3:59 in the first round.
- Michael Johnson defeated Alex Caceres by unanimous decision (20–18, 20–18, 20–18) after two rounds.
- White and the coaches unanimously agreed on the matches for the semifinals:

- Jonathan Brookins vs. Kyle Watson
- Michael Johnson vs Nam Phan

Episode 11: Victory's All That Matters

- Jonathan Brookins defeated Kyle Watson by unanimous decision (30–27, 30–27, 30–27) after three rounds.
- Michael Johnson defeated Nam Phan by split decision (29–28, 28–29, 29–28) after three rounds.
- There was controversy over this fight as both St-Pierre and Koscheck argued that his fighter won.
- Brookins and Johnson, both of Team GSP, are announced as the season's finalists.

== Tournament bracket ==
Elimination Round
Spencer Paige	2
Nam Phan	UD
Cody McKenzie	SUB
Marc Stevens	1
Alex Caceres	SUB
Jeff Lentz	2
Michael Johnson	SUB
Aaron Wilkinson	3
Jonathan Brookins	SUB
Sevak Magakian	1
Dane Sayers	2
Sako Chivitchian	UD
Kyle Watson	SUB
Andy Main	2
Aaron Wilkinson	SUB
Marc Stevens	2

Quarter-Finals
Nam Phan	TKO
Cody McKenzie	2
Alex Caceres	2
Michael Johnson	UD
Jonathan Brookins	SUB
Sako Chivitchian	1
Kyle Watson	SUB
Aaron Wilkinson	1

Semi-Finals
Nam Phan	3
Michael Johnson	SD
Jonathan Brookins	UD
Kyle Watson	3

Finale
Michael Johnson	3
Jonathan Brookins	UD

Legend
	Team GSP
	Team Koscheck
UD	Unanimous Decision
SD	Split Decision
SUB	Submission
TKO	Technical Knockout

== The Ultimate Fighter 12 Finale ==
The Ultimate Fighter: Team GSP vs. Team Koscheck Finale
- The poster for The Ultimate Fighter: Team GSP vs. Team Koscheck Finale
- Promotion: Ultimate Fighting Championship
- Date: December 4, 2010
- Venue: Palms Casino Resort
- City: Las Vegas, Nevada
- Attendance: 1,903
- Total gate: $380,025

Event chronology
UFC 123: Rampage vs. Machida	The Ultimate Fighter: Team GSP vs. Team Koscheck Finale	UFC 124: St-Pierre vs. Koscheck 2

The Ultimate Fighter: Team GSP vs. Team Koscheck Finale (also known as The Ultimate Fighter 12 Finale) was a mixed martial arts event held by the Ultimate Fighting Championship at the Palms Casino Resort in Las Vegas, Nevada on December 4, 2010.

=== Background ===
This was the first event in the UFC to integrate the featherweight & bantamweight classes from World Extreme Cagefighting, which folded later that month. It was also the first event to feature a then-contracted WEC lightweight fighter (Pablo Garza) in a UFC contest, though he debuted in the UFC at featherweight.

Leonard Garcia was set to fight Tyler Toner at this event, but withdrew from the contest, with Team Quest fighter & IFL veteran, Ian Loveland stepping in as Garcia's replacement. It was later reported that Garcia withdrew to face Nam Phan, after his original opponent Alex Caceres was forced from the bout due to injury.

Nick Pace missed weight for his bantamweight bout against Will Campuzano, missing the 135 mark by three pounds. The fight was changed to a catchweight bout and Pace was fined 20% of his purse.

== Results ==
Main Card
Weight class				Method	Round	Time	Notes
Lightweight	Jonathan Brookins	def.	Michael Johnson	Decision (unanimous) (29–28, 29–28, 29–28)	3	5:00	(Note: TUF 12 Lightweight Tournament Final)
Light Heavyweight	Stephan Bonnar	def.	Igor Pokrajac	Decision (unanimous) (29–26, 29–26, 29–26)	3	5:00	(Note: Pokrajac had 1 point deducted at the end of round 2 for two knee strikes on a downed opponent. Bonnar had 1 point deducted at the end of round 3 for strikes to the back of the head.)
Middleweight	Demian Maia	def.	Kendall Grove	Decision (unanimous) (29–28, 29–28, 29–28)	3	5:00
Welterweight	Rick Story	def.	Johny Hendricks	Decision (unanimous) (29–28, 29–28, 29–28)	3	5:00
Featherweight	Leonard Garcia	def.	Nam Phan	Decision (split) (29–28, 27–30, 29–28)	3	5:00
Preliminary card
Weight class				Method	Round	Time	Notes
Lightweight	Cody McKenzie	def.	Aaron Wilkinson	Submission (guillotine choke)	1	2:03	(Note: This bout aired on the broadcast following the Maia vs Grove bout.)
Featherweight	Ian Loveland	def.	Tyler Toner	Decision (unanimous) (30–27, 29–28, 30–26)	3	5:00
Lightweight	Kyle Watson	def.	Sako Chivitchian	Decision (unanimous) (30–27, 30–27, 29–28)	3	5:00
Catchweight (138 lb)	Nick Pace	def.	Will Campuzano	Submission (pillory choke)	3	4:33
Featherweight	Pablo Garza	def.	Fredson Paixão	KO (flying knee)	1	0:51
Middleweight	David Branch	def.	Rich Attonito	Decision (unanimous) (30–27, 30–27, 30–27)	3	5:00

=== Bonus Awards ===
The following fighters received $30,000 bonuses.

- Fight of the Night: Leonard Garcia vs. Nam Phan
- Knockout of the Night: Pablo Garza
- Submission of the Night: Cody McKenzie

== Reported payout ==
The following is the reported payout to the fighters as reported to the Nevada State Athletic Commission. It does not include sponsor money or "locker room" bonuses often given by the UFC and also do not include the UFC's traditional "fight night" bonuses.

- Jonathan Brookins: $16,000 ($8,000 win bonus) def. Michael Johnson: $8,000
- Stephan Bonnar: $62,000 ($31,000 win bonus) def. Igor Pokrajac: $85,000
- Demian Maia: $80,000 ($40,000 win bonus) def. Kendall Grove: $28,000
- Rick Story: $26,000 ($13,000 win bonus) def. Johny Hendricks: $22,000
- Leonard Garcia: $32,000 ($16,000 win bonus) def. Nam Phan: $8,000 ^
- Cody McKenzie: $16,000 ($8,000 win bonus) def. Aaron Wilkinson: $8,000
- Ian Loveland: $10,000 ($5,000 win bonus) def. Tyler Toner: $3,000
- Kyle Watson: $16,000 ($8,000 win bonus) def. Sako Chivitchian: $8,000
- Nick Pace: $6,000 ($3,000 win bonus) def. Will Campuzano: $3,000 ~
- Pablo Garza: $8,000 ($4,000 win bonus) def. Fredson Paixao: $4,000
- David Branch: $16,000 ($8,000 win bonus) def. Rich Attonito: $8,000

^ Phan was also awarded a win bonus

~ Pace was fined 20% of his purse for missing the required weight

== Coaches' fight ==
UFC 124: St-Pierre vs. Koscheck 2 was held on December 11, 2010 in Montreal, Quebec, Canada.

- Welterweight Championship bout: Georges St-Pierre (c) vs. Josh Koscheck

Georges St-Pierre (c) defeated Josh Koscheck via unanimous decision (50–45, 50–45, 50–45) after five rounds.

== See also ==
- The Ultimate Fighter
- List of current UFC fighters
- List of UFC events
- 2010 in UFC
