= Isaiah Ross (basketball) =

American basketball player (born 1996)

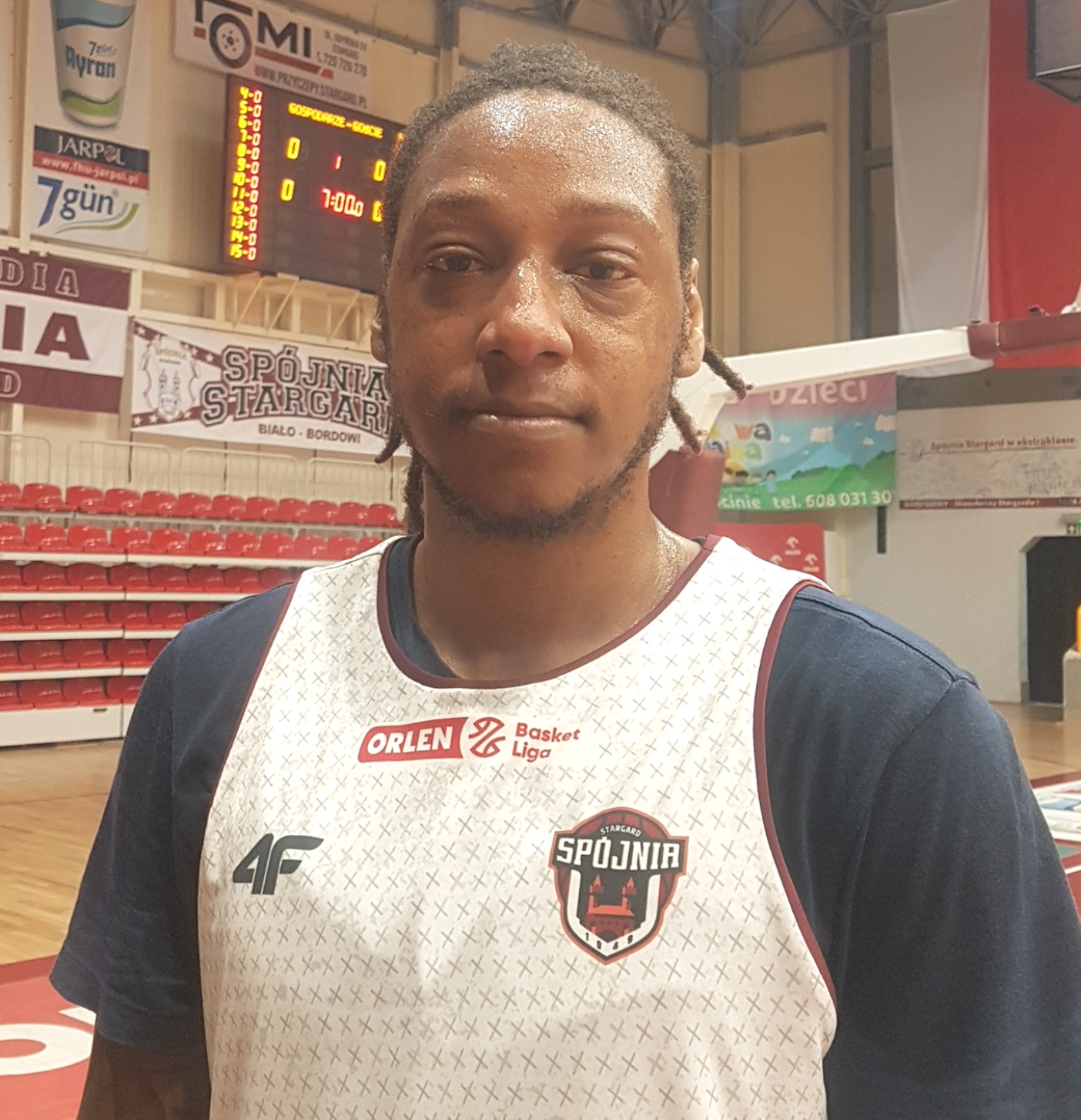
- Ross with Spójnia Stargard in 2025

Free agent
- Position: Shooting guard

Personal information
- Born: October 24, 1996 (age 30) Davenport, Iowa, U.S.
- Listed height: 6 ft 4 in (1.93 m)
- Listed weight: 200 lb (91 kg)

Career information
- High school: Davenport West (Davenport, Iowa); Hillcrest Prep (Phoenix, Arizona)
- College: Kansas City (2016–2018); Iona (2019–2021)
- NBA draft: 2021: undrafted
- Playing career: 2021–present

Career history
- 2021: Santa Cruz Warriors
- 2021: Lakeland Magic
- 2022–2023: Lugano Tigers
- 2023: Chorale Roanne Basket
- 2023: Trepça
- 2024: Psychiko
- 2024–2025: Nokia
- 2025: Spójnia Stargard
- 2025: Unión Atlética
- 2025–2026: Hermine Nantes
- 2026: Psychiko
- 2026: Tauranga Whai

Career highlights
- Kosovo Supercup winner (2023); First-team All-MAAC (2021)

Isaiah Leonja Ross (born October 24, 1996) is an American professional basketball player who last played for the Tauranga Whai of the New Zealand National Basketball League (NZNBL). He played college basketball for the Kansas City Roos and the Iona Gaels.

== High school career ==
Ross attended Davenport West High School. As a senior, he averaged 17 points per game. Ross did a postgraduate season at Hillcrest Prep, playing alongside Deandre Ayton and Marvin Bagley. He committed to playing college basketball for UMKC.

== College career ==
As a freshman at UMKC, Ross averaged 8 points and 1.9 rebounds per game. He averaged 11.3 points and 3.1 rebounds per game as a sophomore. Following the season, he transferred to Iona, sitting out a season per NCAA regulations. As a junior, Ross averaged 11 points, 3.2 rebounds, and 1.1 assists per game. In the offseason, he worked on his defense and passing, improving his foot speed and lateral speed alongside Chasson Randle, and embraced new coach Rick Pitino's skills workouts. In the season opener against Seton Hall, Ross scored 23 points but "played very poorly," according to Pitino. On December 5, 2020, he scored a career-high 33 points in a 82–74 win over Hofstra. During his senior year, Ross helped Iona win the MAAC championship and reach the NCAA Tournament. He averaged 18.4 points, 3.9 rebounds, 1.4 assists and 1.4 steals per game. Ross was a unanimous First Team All-MAAC selection.

== Professional career ==
Ross was selected with the 18th pick in the 2021 NBA G League draft by the Maine Celtics. Two days later, he was traded to the Santa Cruz Warriors. He was waived by the Warriors on December 5 after appearing in eight games. He was acquired by the Lakeland Magic on December 18, but after two games, was waived on December 27. He was acquired by the Oklahoma City Blue on December 30, waived on January 5, then claimed by the Wisconsin Herd on January 6, but then waived again on January 19. He did not play for either the Blue or the Herd.

For the 2022–23 season, Ross joined Lugano Tigers of the Swiss Basketball League. In 25 games, he averaged 23.0 points, 4.3 rebounds, 3.3 assists and 1.6 steals per game. In May 2023, he had a three-game stint with Chorale Roanne Basket of the LNB Élite.

For the 2023–24 season, Ross joined Trepça of the Kosovo Basketball Superleague. He appeared in six league games and four FIBA Europe Cup games before leaving the team in November 2023. In February 2024, he joined Psychiko of the Greek Elite League. In 16 games for Psychiko, he averaged 15.9 points, 4.9 rebounds and 2.6 assists per game.

On October 22, 2024, Ross signed with BC Nokia of the Finnish Korisliiga. In 27 games during the 2024–25 season, he averaged 20.1 points, 3.9 rebounds, 3.5 assists and 1.2 steals per game. On March 31, 2025, he signed with Spójnia Stargard of the Polish Basketball League (PLK). He played six games to finish the 2024–25 PLK season.

Ross started the 2025–26 season with Unión Atlética of the Liga Uruguaya de Básquetbol, averaging 15.1 points, 3.4 rebounds, 3.3 assists and 1.0 steals in 10 games, before leaving the team in November. In December, he joined Hermine Nantes of the French Élite 2, where he played five games between December 12 and January 11. In March 2026, he joined Psychiko for a second stint. In nine games to finish the 2025–26 Greek Elite League season, he averaged 16.8 points, 2.9 rebounds and 2.0 assists per game.

On May 1, 2026, Ross signed with the Tauranga Whai of the New Zealand National Basketball League (NZNBL) for the rest of the 2026 season. He left after appearing in two games.

== Career statistics ==
Legend
GP	Games played	GS	Games started	MPG	Minutes per game
FG%	Field goal percentage	3P%	3-point field goal percentage	FT%	Free throw percentage
RPG	Rebounds per game	APG	Assists per game	SPG	Steals per game
BPG	Blocks per game	PPG	Points per game	**Bold**	Career high

=== College ===
Year	Team	GP	GS	MPG	FG%	3P%	FT%	RPG	APG	SPG	BPG	PPG
2016–17	UMKC	**34**	10	17.2	.394	.376	**.833**	1.9	.6	.5	.0	8.0
2017–18	UMKC	32	17	25.2	.400	.359	.779	3.1	1.0	.5	.0	11.3
2018–19	Iona	Redshirt										
2019–20	Iona	29	**21**	31.0	**.459**	**.401**	.725	3.2	1.1	.7	**.1**	11.0
2020–21	Iona	18	18	**34.5**	.455	.383	.812	**3.9**	**1.4**	**1.4**	**.1**	**18.4**
Career		113	66	25.7	.426	.379	.787	2.9	1.0	.7	.0	11.4

== Personal life ==
Ross graduated from Iona with a degree in communications with an emphasis in public relations.
