= Karo Parisyan =

Armenian mixed martial artist

- Born: August 28, 1982 (age 44); Yerevan, Armenian SSR, Soviet Union (today Armenia)
- Other names: The Heat
- Nationality: Armenian; American
- Height: 5 ft 10 in (178 cm)
- Weight: 169 lb (77 kg; 12 st 1 lb)
- Division: Welterweight
- Reach: 75.5 in (192 cm)
- Style: Judo
- Fighting out of: North Hollywood, California, U.S.
- Team: Team Hayastan
- Rank: Black Belt in Hayastan Grappling; Black Belt in Judo
- Years active: 1999–2017

Mixed martial arts record
- Total: 37
- Wins: 24
- By knockout: 3
- By submission: 11
- By decision: 10
- Losses: 12
- By knockout: 7
- By submission: 1
- By decision: 4
- No contests: 1

Other information
- Notable relatives: Manvel Gamburyan (cousin)
- Mixed martial arts record from Sherdog

Karo Parisyan (born August 28, 1982) is an Armenian-American former mixed martial artist, who last competed in the welterweight division. A professional MMA competitor since 1999, Parisyan is a former WEC Welterweight Champion and has also competed for the UFC, Bellator, and Impact FC.

== Background ==
Parisyan was born in Yerevan, Armenian SSR (today Armenia). His family migrated to the United States when he was six years old. Parisyan started training in judo when he was nine years old under fellow Armenian Gokor Chivichyan. Parisyan stated that his father began taking him to judo lessons because he beat up on his sisters and judo would be an effective outlet for Parisyan to take out his anger. In a book he published, however, Parisyan wrote that his father introduced him to judo to cure his laziness. By age ten, Parisyan was training his Judo under both Chivichyan and Gene LeBell.

== Mixed martial arts career ==
=== Training ===
For more than thirteen years, Parisyan developed under the Hayastan Grappling System, developed by Gokor Chivichyan and Gene LeBell, which blends elements of judo, sambo, catch wrestling, Greco-Roman wrestling and freestyle wrestling. Parisyan continued to train at the Hayastan Academy under Gokor and Gene until late 2005. In early 2012, Karo mentioned in an interview that he has returned to the Hayastan Academy.

=== Judo ===
Parisyan has six junior national titles to his credit and competed in the Olympic judo trials ahead of the 2004 games in Athens. He wrote that going to the Olympics was his dream and that mixed martial arts was only an outlet for his boredom. During the trials, he received a call from UFC management and was invited to compete. He accepted because he needed money. But after the fight against Dave Strasser, his ribs needed recovery and he decided to give up on the trials.

He lost his first fight to Sean Sherk by a controversial decision. In an immediate rematch, Parisyan was unable to come out of his corner, and later explained he had been suffering from a stomach virus.

=== Ultimate Fighting Championship ===
Parisyan made his UFC debut on September 23, 2003, beating Dave Strasser by kimura. In his next fight, Parisyan fought Georges St-Pierre and lost via unanimous decision. During the fight, Parisyan attempted two kimuras, however Parisyan failed to secure them as St-Pierre defended both attempts. Parisyan became the first fighter to go the distance with St-Pierre. He then went on to win the WEC welterweight title, defeating Shonie Carter. He then returned to the UFC, where he won consecutive decision victories over Nick Diaz, Chris Lytle and Matt Serra.

Parisyan's next fight was to take place at UFC 56: Full Force, where he would challenge UFC Welterweight Champion Matt Hughes. However, Parysian suffered a hamstring injury and was forced to pull out. Joe Riggs took his place.

He next fought Nick Thompson at UFC 59 and won via submission (strikes) in the first round.

Parisyan then fought Diego Sanchez at UFC Fight Night 6. He lost via unanimous decision. The fight was chosen as the 2006 Fight of the Year by Wrestling Observer Newsletter.

Following the loss to Sanchez, Parisyan won three consecutive victories over Drew Fickett, Josh Burkman and Ryo Chonan, all via unanimous decision.

Parisyan lost via TKO to Thiago Alves at UFC Fight Night 13 in the second round. Alves showed good resistance against Parisyan's grappling offense and finished Parisyan with a knee from the clinch, followed by strikes.

Parisyan was scheduled to fight Yoshiyuki Yoshida at UFC 88: Breakthrough, but a back injury forced him to drop out of the fight right before the weigh-ins.

After recovering from his back injury, Parisyan returned at UFC 94 on January 31, 2009 in Las Vegas against Dong Hyun Kim. Parisyan defeated Kim in a controversial split decision. Following the fight, Parisyan tested positive for banned painkillers hydrocodone, hydromorphone and oxymorphone. Parisyan has stated that he has a prescription for the medications due to a severe back / hamstring injury. Parisyan was suspended pending a full hearing in mid-March. On March 17, 2009, the NSAC suspended Parisyan for nine months and ruled his decision victory a "no contest".

Parisyan was scheduled to fight Dustin Hazelett at UFC 106, but pulled out of the fight on November 19, the day before weigh-ins. UFC President Dana White responded to the situation on his Twitter stating that Parisyan will "not be fighting Saturday or ever again in the UFC!!" White also stated that he had "a laundry list of excuses." Later that day, Neil Melanson, a longtime friend and training partner of Parisyan's, divulged to MMA news site Five Ounces Of Pain that Parisyan has been battling an addiction to painkillers dating back to an injury suffered while training for a fight.

=== Post-UFC ===
Parisyan entered into talks with Strikeforce, looking to continue his mixed martial arts career in the USA, but it proved unsuccessful.

Parisyan's return fight took place on July 10, 2010 for Impact FC 1. He was initially scheduled to face Luis Dutra Jr., but Dutra would end up being forced off the card with a torn bicep. Parisyan's new opponent was Ben Mortimer, who Parisyan would go on to defeat via rear-naked choke at 4:18 of the second round.

=== Return to the UFC ===
On September 2, 2010, it was announced that Karo would be returning to the UFC. He faced Dennis Hallman at UFC 123 in November. Hallman defeated Parisyan via TKO due to punches at 1:47 in the first round. In a discussion with journalist Ariel Helwani following UFC 123, UFC President Dana White stated he believes Parisyan is through fighting in the UFC.

=== Independent promotions ===
Karo fought highly touted Canadian prospect Ryan Ford on May 19, 2011 in the MMA Live 1 show in London, Ontario, Canada. He was able to neutralize Ford's strength and power by applying his takedowns, as it seemed that the first and second rounds were in favor of Parisyan, but was caught in the third round by a vicious knee to the head which resulted in a cut over Karo's left eye that would end the fight via TKO due to a doctor's stoppage.

Parisyan fought Jordan Smith on September 14 in Brazil, Amazon Forest Combat 1. After a long hard battle going the distance, Parisyan came up short, losing the fight by split decision.

He was expected to fight Dave Menne on March 31, 2012, but Menne was forced out of the bout with an injury. Parisyan instead fought Thomas Denny. He won via unanimous decision.

Parisyan was scheduled to fight Shamar Bailey in the main event of ShoFIGHT 20 in Springfield, Missouri for the vacant welterweight title on June 16, 2012. However, Bailey was forced off the card due to an injury and replaced by fellow UFC veteran John Gunderson. After being stunned by a knee from Gunderson, which resulted in a broken cheek bone, Parisyan was caught in a guillotine choke and lost the fight by submission. Parisyan said after the fight that he tapped due to the pressure on his cheekbone and he wasn't being choked.

Parisyan was expected to fight David Bielkheden in Malmo, Sweden on October 6, 2012 but pulled out of the fight for personal reasons and was replaced by Marcus Davis. Parisyan said at the time: "Everyone knows that it has been a rough road for me over the past couple years. I've tried to just refocus myself and get back to throwing people on their heads, but it hasn't been the same. Not to take anything away from my opponent, but my last fight was devastating for me. My manager and I had a long talk, and he set me up with a sports psychologist. At this point, I need to listen to my doctor and refocus on my life -- not fighting. God willing, fighting will be back in my life at some point, but for now I need to only focus on Karo getting back to Karo."

Parisyan defeated Tiger Bonds via first round armbar on September 29, 2012 at a Gladiator Challenge event.

Parisyan then fought on October 28, 2012 against Edward Darby and won via first round armbar.

=== Bellator MMA ===
Parisyan's first Bellator fight was against fellow judoka Rick Hawn at Bellator 95. Parisyan and Hawn had faced off twice in judo competitions previously, with Hawn winning both their matches at the Judo U.S. Open. In their Bellator bout, Parisyan lost via TKO in the second round.

Parisyan was expected to face Fight Master competitor Cristiano Souza at Bellator 106, but pulled out due to injury.

Parisyan faced Ron Keslar on April 11, 2014 at Bellator 116. He won the fight via knockout in the second round, marking the first KO victory of his MMA career.

Parisyan faced Bellator newcomer and former sparring partner Phil Baroni on July 25, 2014 at Bellator 122. He won the fight by TKO in the first round.

Parisyan was expected to face Marius Žaromskis at Bellator 127 on October 3, 2014. However, Žaromskis was pulled from the bout to fight at another date. Fernando Gonzalez stepped in as a replacement. Parisyan lost the fight via TKO in the first round. However, Gonzalez later failed a drug test and was subsequently fined and given a one-month suspension.

== Championships and accomplishments ==
=== Mixed martial arts ===
- Ultimate Fighting Championship
  - UFC Encyclopedia Awards
    - Fight of the Night (Two times) vs. Georges St-Pierre and Drew Fickett
  - UFC.com Awards
    - 2006: Fight of the Year vs. Diego Sanchez
- World Extreme Cagefighting
  - WEC Welterweight Championship (One time)
- Wrestling Observer Newsletter
  - 2006 Fight of the Year vs. Diego Sanchez on August 17

== Mixed martial arts record ==
Professional record breakdown
37 matches	24 wins	12 losses
By knockout	3	7
By submission	11	1
By decision	10	4
No contests	1	

Res.	Record	Opponent	Method	Event	Date	Round	Time	Location	Notes
Loss	24–12 (1)	Jose Diaz	TKO (retirement)	Extreme Fighters MMA: Ready for War	October 7, 2017	1	5:00	Long Beach, California, United States	
Loss	24–11 (1)	Fernando Gonzalez	TKO (punches)	Bellator 127	October 3, 2014	1	1:43	Temecula, California, United States	Gonzalez tested positive for a banned substance. However the result was not changed to a no contest.
Win	24–10 (1)	Phil Baroni	TKO (punches)	Bellator 122	July 25, 2014	1	2:06	Temecula, California, United States	
Win	23–10 (1)	Ron Keslar	TKO (punches)	Bellator 116	April 11, 2014	2	4:05	Temecula, California, United States	
Loss	22–10 (1)	Rick Hawn	KO (punches)	Bellator 95	April 4, 2013	2	1:55	Atlantic City, New Jersey, United States	
Win	22–9 (1)	Edward Darby	Submission (armbar)	Gladiator Challenge: Heat Returns	October 28, 2012	1	2:10	San Jacinto, California, United States	
Win	21–9 (1)	Tiger Bonds	Submission (armbar)	Gladiator Challenge: King Of The Mountain	September 29, 2012	1	1:03	San Diego, California, United States	
Loss	20–9 (1)	John Gunderson	Submission (guillotine choke)	ShoFight 20	June 16, 2012	1	2:47	O'Reilly Family Event Center, Springfield, Missouri, United States	For the vacant ShoFIGHT Welterweight Championship.
Win	20–8 (1)	Thomas Denny	Decision (unanimous)	WMMA 1 - Fighting for a Better World	March 31, 2012	3	5:00	El Paso, Texas, United States	
Loss	19–8 (1)	Jordan Smith	Decision (split)	Amazon Forest Combat 1	September 14, 2011	3	5:00	Manaus, Brazil	
Loss	19–7 (1)	Ryan Ford	TKO (doctor stoppage)	JEG - MMA Live 1	May 19, 2011	3	1:26	London, Ontario, Canada	
Loss	19–6 (1)	Dennis Hallman	TKO (punches)	UFC 123	November 20, 2010	1	1:47	Auburn Hills, Michigan, United States	
Win	19–5 (1)	Ben Mortimer	Submission (rear-naked choke)	Impact FC 1	July 10, 2010	2	4:18	Brisbane, Australia	
NC	18–5 (1)	Dong Hyun Kim	NC (overturned by NSAC)	UFC 94	January 31, 2009	3	5:00	Las Vegas, Nevada, United States	Originally a split decision win for Parisyan; overturned after he tested positive for banned painkillers.
Loss	18–5	Thiago Alves	TKO (knee and punches)	UFC Fight Night: Florian vs. Lauzon	April 2, 2008	2	0:34	Broomfield, Colorado, United States	
Win	18–4	Ryo Chonan	Decision (unanimous)	UFC 78	November 17, 2007	3	5:00	Newark, New Jersey, United States	
Win	17–4	Josh Burkman	Decision (unanimous)	UFC 71	May 26, 2007	3	5:00	Las Vegas, Nevada, United States	
Win	16–4	Drew Fickett	Decision (unanimous)	UFC Fight Night: Sanchez vs. Riggs	December 13, 2006	3	5:00	San Diego, California, United States	
Loss	15–4	Diego Sanchez	Decision (unanimous)	UFC Fight Night: Sanchez vs. Parisyan	August 17, 2006	3	5:00	Las Vegas, Nevada, United States	Fight of the Night. Fight of the Year.
Win	15–3	Nick Thompson	TKO (submission to punches)	UFC 59	April 15, 2006	1	4:44	Anaheim, California, United States	
Win	14–3	Matt Serra	Decision (unanimous)	UFC 53	June 4, 2005	3	5:00	Atlantic City, New Jersey, United States	
Win	13–3	Chris Lytle	Decision (unanimous)	UFC 51	February 5, 2005	3	5:00	Las Vegas, Nevada, United States	
Win	12–3	Nick Diaz	Decision (split)	UFC 49	August 21, 2004	3	5:00	Las Vegas, Nevada, United States	
Win	11–3	Shonie Carter	Decision (unanimous)	WEC 10	May 21, 2004	3	5:00	Lemoore, California, United States	Won the WEC Welterweight Championship. Later vacated the title.
Loss	10–3	Georges St-Pierre	Decision (unanimous)	UFC 46	January 31, 2004	3	5:00	Las Vegas, Nevada, United States	
Win	10–2	Dave Strasser	Submission (kimura)	UFC 44	September 26, 2003	1	3:52	Las Vegas, Nevada, United States	
Win	9–2	Fernando Vasconcelos	Decision (unanimous)	King of the Cage 22	March 23, 2003	3	5:00	San Jacinto, California, United States	
Win	8–2	Antonio McKee	Decision (unanimous)	Ultimate Cage Fighting 3	February 15, 2003	3	5:00	Hollywood, California, United States	
Win	7–2	Darrell Smith	Submission (armbar)	Reality Submission Fighting 3	March 30, 2001	1	0:59	Belleville, Illinois, United States	
Loss	6–2	Sean Sherk	TKO (corner stoppage)	Reality Submission Fighting 2	January 5, 2001	1	16:20	Belleville, Illinois, United States	
Loss	6–1	Sean Sherk	Decision (unanimous)	Reality Submission Fighting 1	October 10, 2000	1	18:00	Belleville, Illinois, United States	
Win	6–0	Guido Jennings	Submission (choke)	Kage Kombat 16	June 7, 1999	1	6:33	California, United States	
Win	5–0	Justin Bumphus	Submission (choke)	ESF: Empire One	May 15, 1999	1	N/A	Corona, California, United States	
Win	4–0	Scott Davis	Submission (armbar)	Kage Kombat 14	April 5, 1999	1	2:16	Los Angeles, California, United States	
Win	3–0	Jason Rittgers	Submission (armbar)	Kage Kombat 14	April 5, 1999	1	1:58	Los Angeles, California, United States	
Win	2–0	Zach McKinney	Submission (armbar)	Kage Kombat 12	February 1, 1999	1	0:23	Los Angeles, California, United States	
Win	1–0	Brian Warren	Submission (ankle lock)	Kage Kombat 12	February 1, 1999	1	0:44	Los Angeles, California, United States	

== See also ==
- List of male mixed martial artists

Preceded by Shonie Carter	3rd WEC Welterweight Champion; May 21, 2004 – October, 2005	Vacant Parisyan signs with UFC Title next held by Mike Pyle
