= Sako Chivitchian =

American mixed martial arts fighter

- Born: Sarkis Chivitchian; March 11, 1984 (age 42); Armenian SSR, Soviet Union
- Other names: The Psycho; The Armenian Psycho; The Chainsaw
- Nationality: American
- Height: 5 ft 11 in (1.80 m)
- Weight: 155 lb (70 kg; 11.1 st)
- Division: Lightweight; Welterweight (formerly)
- Reach: 71 in (180 cm)
- Fighting out of: Glendale, California, United States
- Team: Hayastan Studio
- Rank: Black Belt in Judo
- Years active: 1999 - one fight 2009-present

Mixed martial arts record
- Total: 9
- Wins: 8
- By knockout: 1
- By submission: 5
- By decision: 2
- Losses: 1
- By decision: 1

Other information
- Mixed martial arts record from Sherdog

Sako Chivitchian (born March 11, 1984) is an Armenian-born American mixed martial arts (MMA) fighter who competes in the lightweight division. He emigrated to the United States and is based in Los Angeles. A full-time professional MMA competitor since 2009, Chivitchian mostly competed in his regional circuit of California before signing with the Ultimate Fighting Championship to appear on The Ultimate Fighter: Team GSP vs. Team Koscheck.

== Mixed martial arts career ==
=== Early career ===
Chivitchian began training in judo at the age of six with his uncle Gokor Chivichyan. He has won a total of eleven U.S. national titles including junior titles in 2000 and 2001, and two junior Olympic championships. In 2001–2002, he was named the United States Judo Federation's National Youth Male Athlete of the Year. He was placed first and third in the Junior U.S. Open Judo Championships. He also competed in the 2002 World Junior Championships in South Korea, where he lost his only match.

In addition to judo, Chivitchian took up wrestling, and by age 14 had placed second at the California State Championships and third at the Freestyle State Championships. He next took up mixed martial arts (MMA) and won his inaugural fight (at age 15) in 98 seconds by armbar. Chivitchian's opponent in his first fight was Timothy Morris, who has previously lost to teammate Manny Gamburyan. In the years following, he took up jiu-jitsu and boxing.

Chivitchian was involved in a shooting at age 19, after he and his friends were jumped by a gang. Chivitchian suffered a gunshot wound to his leg which made him temporarily unable to train, prompting his move to college and into real estate.

Chivitchian trains in Glendale, California at the Hayastan Studio, alongside The Ultimate Fighter 5 runner-up and World Extreme Cagefighting featherweight contender Manny Gamburyan.

Despite having first fought professionally in MMA in 1999, Chivitchian did not take up fighting full-time until 2009. He won his return bout in January 2009 by technical knockout (TKO) and achieved a submission victory two months later. In October 2009, Chivitchian won a further fight via submission, before claiming a split decision victory in December.

=== The Ultimate Fighter ===
Chivitchian then signed with the Ultimate Fighting Championship (UFC) to appear on The Ultimate Fighter: Team GSP vs. Team Koscheck. He competed on the debut episode against Toby Grear, taking a unanimous decision victory. In the next episode, the team picks were made and Josh Koscheck selected Chivitchian as his third pick (fifth overall).

Chivitchian faced Dane Sayers in his opening round matchup. His performance was criticised for grabbing the fence to avoid being taken down on multiple occasions, yet he was not penalised with any point deduction. Chivitchian won the fight by unanimous decision as all three judges scored the fight 20–18.

In the quarter finals, Chivitchian faced Jonathan Brookins. Brookins was able to throw Chivitchian to the mat, which forced Chivitchian to try to stand up. Brookins then got hooks in and worked for a rear naked choke, eventually sealing it soon after, eliminating Chivitchian from the competition.

=== Ultimate Fighting Championship ===
Chivitchian made his UFC debut at The Ultimate Fighter: Team GSP vs. Team Koscheck Finale against Kyle Watson and lost by unanimous decision (30–27, 30–27, 29–28). He along with Aaron Wilkinson was released from the promotion.

== Mixed martial arts record ==
Professional record breakdown
9 matches	8 wins	1 loss
By knockout	1	0
By submission	5	0
By decision	2	1
Draws	0	

Res.	Record	Opponent	Method	Event	Date	Round	Time	Location	Notes
Win	8–1	Dominique Chisem	Submission	Xplode Fight Series - Summer Fight Night 3	June 21, 2013	2	1:10	Twentynine Palms, California, United States	
Win	7–1	Tony Lewis	Submission (rear-naked choke)	Gladiator Challenge - Battleground	March 24, 2013	1	0:40	San Jacinto, California, United States	
Win	6–1	Preston Scharf	Decision (split)	Lights Out Promotions - Chaos at the Casino	May 5, 2012	3	5:00	Inglewood, California, United States	
Loss	5–1	Kyle Watson	Decision (unanimous)	The Ultimate Fighter 12 Finale	December 4, 2010	3	5:00	Las Vegas, Nevada, United States	
Win	5–0	Marcos Gonzalez	Decision (split)	NFAMMA - Resurrection	December 18, 2009	3	3:00	Ventura, California, United States	
Win	4–0	Sergio Salcido	Submission (armbar)	Long Beach Fight Night 6	October 18, 2009	1	1:28	Long Beach, California, United States	
Win	3–0	Frank Baldivia	Submission (rear-naked choke)	California Xtreme Fighting	March 26, 2009	1	1:28	El Monte, California, United States	
Win	2–0	Noe Rodriguez	TKO (punches)	California Xtreme Fighting	January 29, 2009	3	0:14	El Monte, California, United States	
Win	1–0	Timothy Morris	Submission (armbar)	Kage Kombat 14	April 5, 1999	1	1:38	Los Angeles, California, United States	

=== Mixed martial arts exhibition record ===
Exhibition record breakdown		
3 matches	2 wins	1 loss
By knockout	0	0
By submission	0	1
By decision	2	0

Res.	Record	Opponent	Method	Event	Date	Round	Time	Location	Notes
Lose	2-1	(United States) Jonathan Brookins	Submission (rear-naked choke)	The Ultimate Fighter: Team GSP vs. Team Koscheck		1	2:05	Las Vegas, Nevada, United States	Quarter-finals
Win	2-0	(United States) Dane Sayers	Decision (unanimous)	The Ultimate Fighter: Team GSP vs. Team Koscheck		2	5:00	Las Vegas, Nevada, United States	Preliminary bout
Win	1-0	(United States) Toby Grear	Decision (unanimous)	The Ultimate Fighter: Team GSP vs. Team Koscheck		2	5:00	Las Vegas, Nevada, United States	Elimination bout
