= Tony Halme =

Finnish boxer and politician (1963–2010)

- Born: Tony Christian Halme; January 6, 1963; Helsinki, Finland
- Died: January 8, 2010 (aged 47); Helsinki, Finland
- Spouse: Katja Talus (m. 1998; div. 2005)
- Professional wrestling career
- Ring names: The Viking; Finland Hellraiser Thor; Finland Thor; Royal Viking; Tony Halme; Ludvig Borga
- Billed height: 6 ft 3 in (191 cm)
- Billed weight: 275 lb (125 kg)
- Billed from: Helsinki, Finland
- Trained by: Brad Rheingans; Gene LeBell; Gokor Chivichyan; Masa Saito; Verne Gagne
- Debut: 1989
- Retired: December 20, 1997

Member of the Finnish Parliament for Helsinki
- In office 2003–2007

Personal details
- Party: Independent
- Other political affiliations: True Finns (2003–2007)

Tony Christian Halme (January 6, 1963 – January 8, 2010) was a Finnish politician, athlete, author, actor, singer. He was a member of the Finnish Parliament from 2003 to 2007 as an independent elected on the True Finns party list. Halme was also known by the pseudonym Viikinki, which he used while appearing in Gladiaattorit, a Finnish version of the TV game show Gladiators, in the 1990s.

He was also a professional wrestler best known for his appearances with Catch Wrestling Association (CWA), New Japan Pro-Wrestling (NJPW) and World Wrestling Federation (WWF) under the ring name Ludvig Borga; a mixed martial artist and the first fighter from the Nordic countries to ever compete in the Ultimate Fighting Championship (UFC); and a professional boxer.

During his time in CWA, he was an accomplished main eventer, who headlined many events for the company including the company's flagship event Euro Catch Festival three times.

== Early life ==
Tony Halme spent his childhood in Lauttasaari, Helsinki. His father left the family when Tony was six months old. His older brother – who was five years older than Tony – assumed the role of father figure. Halme only heard from his father a couple of times during his life. His mother was an alcoholic with a constant revolving door of male partners. As an adult, Halme considered his brother to be his only true friend. In the mid-1970s, Tony, his mother and brother moved to Soukka, Espoo. Halme attended kansakoulu and a oppikoulu. He later attended a Swedish-language school and studied at the electrician line at the Strömberg School of Engineering. However, he dropped out of the latter after two years. At the age of 16, Halme left his mother's home and moved in with his uncle to Kannelmäki.

Athletic from a young age, he actively participated in sports such as handball, football and ice hockey. He also began power training and weightlifting in his late teens after watching his brothers, who were on the Finnish national team. Aged 17, he had won a silver medal at the Finnish Bodybuilding Championship. He also worked a wide variety of jobs, including fishmonger, gatekeeper, glass cutter, singer, page, stuntman, TV and radio presenter, and coach. He later enlisted in the Finnish army and continued his training with the Finnish military sports team. After leaving the army, he became involved in boxing and worked as a bouncer in bars.

Halme developed a fascination with the United States after seeing Martin Scorsese’s film Taxi Driver at the age of 12, Halme also had a dream to get to the Gold's Gym and see it. He left Finland to live in Los Angeles in the 1980s and lived there for 15 years. He resumed bodybuilding in the US also and began to take anabolic steroids regularly. He worked as a bodyguard for the music group Cheap Trick and musician Gene Simmons, and also as an actor, professional wrestler and a boxer.

== Professional wrestling career ==
=== Early career (1989–1990) ===
Halme was trained by Verne Gagne as a powerhouse professional wrestler. In 1990, he wrestled in New Zealand losing to Tom Magee.

=== Universal Wrestling Federation (1990) ===
He made his debut for Herb Abrams's Universal Wrestling Federation (UWF) on October 29, 1990 as The Viking. In his first match, he defeated The Patriot, not to be confused with Del Wilkes, but a no name wrestler with a mask. He then went on to defeat Kevin Benjamin.

=== New Japan Pro-Wrestling (1990–1993) ===
On October 25, 1990, Halme made his debut for the Japanese promotion New Japan Pro-Wrestling (NJPW), defeating The Soul Taker in what was billed as a "boxer vs. wrestler" match. Halme was brought in as an outsider and billed as a professional boxing champion with his matches billed as Mixed martial arts matches. He was instantly pushed as a big deal, scoring wins over the likes of Scott Norton, Vader and most notably Shinya Hashimoto on December 26, 1990. Halme was main eventing shows regularly as he was pushed as the biggest star of a crew that included the likes of Bobby Eaton, Chris Benoit, Dean Malenko, Eddy Guerrero and Fit Finlay. Despite Halme not getting over with NJPW fans, the company was doing strong business during his push.

On April 30, 1991, Halme defeated Masashi Aoyagi in a boxer versus karate match. He remained undefeated in NJPW until September 23, 1991, when he was defeated by Shinya Hashimoto in their third match against each other in front of 18,000 fans at the Yokohama Arena. While Halme's matches with Hashimoto were not considered quality matches, he has been credited with helping Hashimoto take his career to another level as the win made Hashimoto look like a "real fighter" as opposed to a professional wrestler. Halme's "boxer versus wrestler" gimmick was ended on October 18, 1991, when he was defeated by Vader.

In 1992, Halme was teamed in matches with Scott Norton, Brad Armstrong, Bam Bam Bigelow and Barry Windham. He also competed in the NJPW Super Grade Tag League II teaming with Masahiro Chono, together scoring 8 points and finishing fourth overall. The tournament was won by Shinya Hashimoto and Riki Choshu. On November 22, 1992, Halme and Norton won the IWGP Tag Team Championship from The Steiner Brothers (Rick and Scott). However, the next night, Halme and Norton were forced to face each other with separate tag team partners with Halme and Ron Powers losing to Norton and TNT.

On December 14, Halme and Norton lost the IWGP Tag Team Championship to the Hell Raisers (Hawk Warrior and Power Warrior). On January 4, 1993, at Fantastic Story in Tokyo Dome (in North America aired on PPV as WCW/New Japan Supershow III), Halme was pinned by Ron Simmons. On February 16, 1993, Halme teamed up with Monsieur Rambo for the IWGP Tag Team Championship against the Hell Raisers, but lost.

Behind the scenes, Halme started having problems with Hawk Warrior and Scott Norton. It also came out that Halme had knocked out Norton in a legitimate street fight, though some claimed this was the result of a sucker punch by Halme. Fearing that Norton would be looking for retribution on Halme, NJPW officials took a secret vote on what to do with the two. Afterwards, Halme started losing matches more regularly and eventually left the promotion in June 1993. His last match took place on June 17, when he and The Barbarian lost to John Tenta and Haku.

=== World Wrestling Federation (1993–1994) ===
On Superstars aired on July 24, Halme debuted in the World Wrestling Federation (WWF) as Ludvig Borga, a heel Finn who appeared in a series of vignettes castigating Americans for their perceived deficiencies in issues such as environmental laws and their educational system. His singlet was adorned with the Finnish flag, and his entrance music was Maamme, the country's national anthem. After an initial streak of squash victories over jobbers, Borga defeated former Intercontinental Champion Marty Jannetty at SummerSlam.

Borga was immediately pushed to main event status as he entered a feud with the federation's top babyface, "Made in the USA" Lex Luger. On the October 30, 1993 edition of Superstars (filmed September 28), Borga had the biggest win of his career when he ended Tatanka's undefeated streak of nearly two years, dominating him throughout their match and ultimately knocking him out with a steel chair while the referee was distracted by Mr. Fuji at ringside. In a mockery of Luger's past "Narcissist" gimmick, Borga pinned Tatanka with one finger. At Survivor Series, Borga participated in the main event, teaming up with Yokozuna, Quebecer Jacques and Crush as the "Foreign Fanatics" against "All-Americans" Lex Luger, The Undertaker and The Steiner Brothers. Borga and Luger were the final two remaining participants and Borga was eliminated by Luger after a running forearm smash. On December 14, Borga pinned Intercontinental Champion Razor Ramon at a house show, but the win was overturned and the match resumed because Razor's foot was on the bottom rope. Borga pinned Razor again after Shawn Michaels hit Razor with a title belt, but the decision was reversed and Borga disqualified.

On January 17, 1994, Halme injured his ankle in a match with Rick Steiner, forcing the WWF to cancel future plans for the Borga character that included a scheduled appearance at the 1994 Royal Rumble and a proposed WrestleMania X match against Earthquake, Borga was replaced by Adam Bomb who was defeated in seconds. Halme left the company soon after.

=== Return to Universal Wrestling Federation (1994) ===
After leaving the WWF, Halme returned to UWF for Blackjack Brawl as the Finland Hellraiser Thor against Bob Orton Jr. in a double disqualification.

=== Fighting Network Rings (1994–1997) ===
Halme returned to Japan in August 1994, this time working for Fighting Network Rings. During his debut, he defeated Thomas Lurosi by knockout. That Fall, he participated in a Mega Battle Tournament where he defeated Dimitri Petkov and Tarial Bitsadze before losing to Akira Maeda in the third round.

In 1995, lost twice to Dick Vrij and once to Volk Han.

He would lose to Mitsuya Nagai on January 24, 1996.

His final match with RINGS was a loss to Dick Vrij on April 22, 1997.

=== Catch Wrestling Association (1995–1997) ===
Halme wrestled as Ludvig Borga for Catch Wrestling Association (CWA) in 1995. On December 20, Borga won the World Heavyweight Championship, his first and only singles championship, by defeating Rambo at the 1995 Euro Catch Festival. Borga held the title for over a year, including a major title defense against August Smisl at the Euro Catch Festival in July. He then lost the title back to Rambo at Euro Catch Festival on December 21. His final match for the CWA was a boxing match against Tony Richardson, which he won by knocking out Richardson in the fourth round.

== Mixed martial arts ==
After retiring from professional wrestling in 1997, Halme went on to fight in the RINGS and Ultimate Fighting Championship, though without appreciable success, notably a 56-second submission loss to Randy Couture at UFC XIII.

== Political career ==
In the early 2000s, Halme met Veikko Vallin, who convinced Halme that he should run for Finnish parliament. Vallin became Halme's campaign manager and edited a book called Viikingin voimaopas, which was used to finance the election campaign. Halme became a member of the Finns Party and entered parliament in the 2003 parliamentary elections. During his parliamentary career, Halme raised controversies. The day after the elections, Halme referred to President Tarja Halonen as a lesbian in a radio interview. Halme stated that if a lesbian can be president of Finland and he can be a member of Parliament, anything seems possible. A huge uproar ensued as much of the Finnish media treated the statement as a personal attack on Halonen; Halonen herself made no comment. Halme later apologized, stating that he was sorry that the statement had been interpreted as an insult and that he had been under the genuine impression that Halonen was a lesbian. Halme opted not to run for re-election in 2007 due to health issues.

Halme was also elected to the City Council of Helsinki in the 2004 municipal elections, but announced he would not participate in the council's activities. His term officially ended in 2008.

== Personal life ==
Halme began his compulsory military service on October 1983, at the military base of Pioneeripuisto in Koria, Finland. Halme received several travel bans because he did not return from vacation on time and was also guilty of assault and battery.

Halme had a Schutzstaffel tattoo on his calf; the WWF made him put tape over it when he wrestled.

In 1993, Halme divorced his American wife, Adriana Estrada, whom he had met in the U.S. in 1989. With the help of the marriage, Halme got a green card for the United States. From 1998 to 2005, he was married to Katja Talus.

During his years in the U.S., Halme was convicted of firearm offenses in the 1990s, and in February 1999, he was in the San Pedro detention center, Los Angeles, for two weeks before he was deported from the U.S.

On July 4, 2003, a handgun was fired inside Halme's apartment. No one was injured, but the gun was unlicensed. Halme was subsequently hospitalized, as he had only days before been in a boxing match and was using prescription painkillers, but his blood had additionally contained trace amounts of amphetamines, while a police search of his House of Parliament office turned up illegal steroids. Halme claimed that somebody had put the amphetamines into his drink without his knowledge. In January 2004, his trial was broadcast live on television by the MTV3 digital television channel. Halme received a four-month suspended sentence and a fine, but continued to serve as Member of Parliament. In 2006, he was convicted for driving while impaired.

In early March 2006, Halme was involuntarily committed to a mental hospital, reportedly due to delirium caused by excessive alcohol use. Earlier in 2006 he had been diagnosed with alcohol-related cirrhosis and acute pancreatitis. After spending almost the entire year of 2006 on sick leave, he went on disability pension at end of the Parliamentary term.

In December 2009, Halme told a newspaper that he was suffering from impairment of his short-term memory and had trouble remembering anything, but was still trying to write a book on his political career.

== Death ==
On January 8, 2010, two days after his 47th birthday, Halme died from a self-inflicted gunshot wound, from an unlicensed handgun. His body was found two days later at his home in Helsinki, Herttoniemi.

== Filmography ==
Year	Title	Role	Notes
1990	Lionheart	Security guard	
1991	The Master Demon	Viktor	
1994	Death Match	Han's #1 Bodyguard	
1995	Zhong Guo long		
1995	Fist of the North Star	Kemp	
1995	Die Hard with a Vengeance	Roman	
1996	American Tigers	Dettman	
1998	Whatever It Takes	Opponent	
2001	Ponterosa	Mauri	
2003	Kohtalon kirja	the Commander	(final film role)

== Other media ==
Halme authored five books and recorded one album called Mestarit salilla. Halme had a modest film career starring in Finnish movies Ponterosa and Kohtalon kirja, and in 1995 had small roles overseas in Die Hard with a Vengeance and Fist of the North Star. Halme was also cast in a minor role in the 1997 blockbuster film Titanic but had to withdraw due to a filming delay.

In 1993, Halme's professional wrestling persona was part of the Japanese wrestling video game Shin Nippon Pro Wrestling: Chou Senshi in Tokyo Dome for Super Famicom (Super Nintendo Entertainment System).

In 2022, a Finnish documentary film Viikinki (dokumenttielokuva) explored Tony Halme's entire life.

Halme was featured on Vice Media's Dark Side of the Ring season 6 broadcast in April 2025.

- Books
  - Jumala armahtaa, minä en (1998) (Title translation: God Has Mercy, I Don't)
  - Tuomiopäivä (2001) (Title translation: The Judgment Day)
  - Viikingin voimaopas (2003) (Title translation: The Viking's strength guide)
  - Kovan päivän ilta (2003) (Title translation: A Hard Day's Night)
  - Testamentti (2010, posthumously) (Title translation: The Testament)
  - Tony Halme. Uho, tuho ja perintö (2024) (Title translation: Tony Halme. Bluster, destruction and legacy)
- Albums
  - Mestarit salilla (Title translation: The champions at the gym) (2001)
- Singles
  - "I Am Ironman" (1998)
  - "Viikinki" (Title translation: "The Viking") (1999)
  - "Mä oon tällainen" (Title translation: "I am like this") (2000)
  - "Painu pelle hiiteen" (Title translation: "Sod off, clown") (2001)
  - "Isätön poika" (Title translation: "The fatherless son") (2002)

== Championships and accomplishments ==
- Catch Wrestling Association
  - CWA World Heavyweight Championship (1 time)
- New Japan Pro-Wrestling
  - IWGP Tag Team Championship (1 time) – with Scott Norton
- Pro Wrestling Illustrated
  - PWI ranked him #145 of the top 500 singles wrestlers in the PWI 500 in 1993

== Professional boxing record ==
19 fights	13 wins	6 losses
By knockout	10	5
By decision	3	0
By disqualification	0	1

No.	Result	Record	Opponent	Type	Round, time	Date	Location	Notes
19	Win	13–6	(Kenya) Chris Sirengo	UD	6	29 Nov 2002	Töölö Sports Hall, Helsinki, Finland	
18	Loss	12–6	(United States) Garing Lane	RTD	4 (6), 3:00	13 Oct 2001	Parken Stadium, Copenhagen, Denmark	
17	Win	12–5	(Russia) Almaz Gismejev	RTD	3 (8), 2:00	20 Feb 2001	Ice Hall, Helsinki, Finland	
16	Loss	11–5	(France) Yacine Kingbo	KO	2 (12), 3:00	3 Oct 2000	Ice Hall, Helsinki, Finland	
15	Win	11–4	(Finland) Mika Kihlström	KO	4 (10), 1:18	17 Apr 2000	Ice Hall, Helsinki, Finland	Won Finnish heavyweight title
14	Win	10–4	(Hungary) Ferenc Deák	KO	1, 2:59	22 Nov 1999	Ice Hall, Helsinki, Finland	
13	Loss	9–4	(Mexico) Agustin Corpus	KO	3, 1:38	6 Sep 1999	Ice Hall, Helsinki, Finland	
12	Win	9–3	(United States) Iran Barkley	SD	12	19 Apr 1999	Ice Hall, Helsinki, Finland	Won vacant WBF (Federation) Americas heavyweight title
11	Win	8–3	(United States) Ken Woods	KO	2, 1:07	16 Nov 1998	Ice Hall, Helsinki, Finland	
10	Loss	7–3	(Finland) Mika Kihlström	TKO	5 (10), 1:57	14 Sep 1998	Ice Hall, Helsinki, Finland	Lost Finnish heavyweight title
9	Win	7–2	(United States) Terry Armstrong	KO	1, 1:37	16 Mar 1998	Ice Hall, Helsinki, Finland	
8	Win	6–2	(Finland) Jukka Järvinen	KO	1 (10), 2:22	29 Sep 1997	Ice Hall, Helsinki, Finland	Won Finnish heavyweight title
7	Win	5–2	(United States) Paul Genick	KO	1, 0:17	6 Sep 1997	(United States) Tropworld Casino and Entertainment Resort, Atlantic City, New Jersey, US	
6	Loss	4–2	(Finland) Jukka Järvinen	DQ	3 (10), 2:54	9 Sep 1996	Ice Hall, Helsinki, Finland	For vacant Finnish heavyweight title; Halme disqualified for repeated headbutts
5	Win	4–1	(United States) Robert Swenson	KO	1, 2:28	26 May 1996	Urheilutalo, Helsinki, Finland	
4	Loss	3–1	(United States) Patrick Freeman	KO	4 (4), 2:55	27 Apr 1996	(United States) The Aladdin, Paradise, Nevada, US	
3	Win	3–0	(United States) Tony Messenger	TKO	1, 1:27	4 Mar 1996	Helsinki, Finland	
2	Win	2–0	(United States) Archie Perry	PTS	5	26 Jun 1995	(United States) Great Western Forum, Inglewood, California, US	
1	Win	1–0	(United States) Bradford Powell	KO	1 (4), 0:55	10 Jun 1995	(United States) Caesars Palace, Paradise, Nevada, US	

== Mixed martial arts record ==
Professional record breakdown
5 matches	1 win	4 losses
By knockout	1	2
By submission	0	1
By decision	0	1

Res.	Record	Opponent	Method	Event	Date	Round	Time	Location	Notes
Loss	1–4	Randy Couture	Submission (rear-naked choke)	UFC 13: Ultimate Force	May 30, 1997	1	0:56	Augusta, Georgia, USA	
Loss	1–3	Dick Vrij	TKO (doctor stoppage)	Rings - Extension Fighting 2	April 22, 1997	1	2:42	Japan	
Loss	1–2	Mitsuya Nagai	Submission	Rings - Budokan Hall 1996	January 24, 1996	1	8:58	Tokyo, Japan	
Loss	1–1	Dick Vrij	KO	Rings - Budokan Hall 1995	January 25, 1995	1	2:55	Tokyo, Japan	
Win	1–0	Tariel Bitsadze	KO	Rings: Battle Dimensions Tournament 1994	October 23, 1994	1	N/A	Tokyo, Japan	

== See also ==
- List of premature professional wrestling deaths
