= JaQuan Lyle =

American basketball player

Ja'Quan Lyle
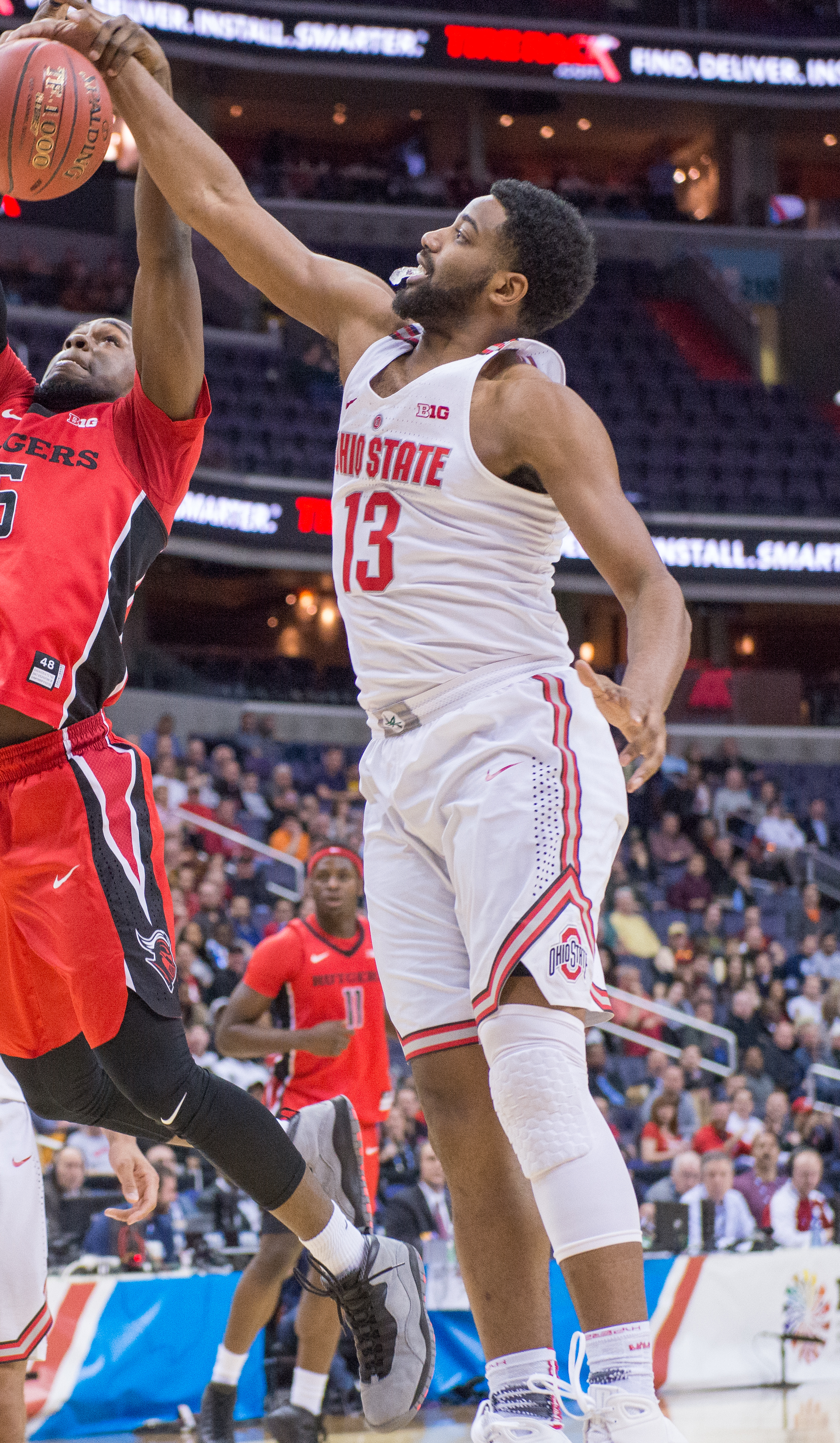
- Lyle with Ohio State in 2017

Free agent
- Position: Point guard / shooting guard

Personal information
- Born: February 24, 1996 (age 30)
- Listed height: 6 ft 5 in (1.96 m)
- Listed weight: 205 lb (93 kg)

Career information
- High school: Benjamin Bosse (Evansville, Indiana); Huntington Prep (Huntington, West Virginia); IMG Academy (Bradenton, Florida)
- College: Ohio State (2015–2017); New Mexico (2019–2020)
- NBA draft: 2020: undrafted
- Playing career: 2020–present

Career history
- 2020: Kolossos Rodou
- 2021: Cañeros del Este

JaQuan Lyle (born February 24, 1996) is an American professional basketball player. He played college basketball for the Ohio State Buckeyes and the New Mexico Lobos.

== High school career ==
Lyle played for Benjamin Bosse High School in Evansville, Indiana for three years. As a junior, he averaged 27 points, 13.4 rebounds and 6.8 assists per game, earning Second Team All-State honors from the Associated Press. For his senior season, Lyle transferred to Huntington Prep School in Huntington, West Virginia. He played a postgraduate year at IMG Academy in Bradenton, Florida. Lyle averaged 16 points per game before suffering a season-ending torn meniscus that required surgery.

=== Recruiting ===
Lyle held college basketball scholarship offers from Indiana, Illinois and Xavier as a freshman in high school. On June 26, 2013, he committed to play college basketball for Louisville. Lyle later decommitted, and on March 19, 2014, he committed to Oregon. After not being cleared by the National Collegiate Athletic Association (NCAA) and being removed from the roster, he switched his commitment to Ohio State on January 30, 2015. Formerly a five-star recruit, Lyle was a consensus four-star recruit at the end of his high school career.

College recruiting
Name	Hometown	School	Height	Weight	Commit date
JaQuan Lyle; PG	Huntington, West Virginia	IMG Academy	6 ft 5 in (1.96 m)	215 lb (98 kg)	Jan 29, 2014
JaQuan Lyle; PG	Recruit ratings: Rivals: 247Sports: ESPN: (87)				
Overall recruit ranking: 247Sports: 55 ESPN: 42
Note: In many cases, Scout, Rivals, 247Sports, On3, and ESPN may conflict in their listings of height and weight.; In these cases, the average was taken. ESPN grades are on a 100-point scale.; Sources: "2014 Team Ranking". Rivals.

== College career ==
Lyle entered his freshman season at Ohio State as a replacement for D'Angelo Russell, who left for the NBA. On January 10, 2016, he scored a season-high 29 points in an 85–60 loss to Indiana. On January 13, Lyle posted a triple-double of 16 points, 12 rebounds and 11 assists in a 94–68 win against Rutgers. As a freshman, Lyle averaged 11.2 points, 4.7 rebounds and 4.2 assists per game, though he struggled with shooting and decision-making. On January 1, 2017, he scored a sophomore season-high 26 points in a 75–70 loss to Illinois. Lyle left the team on April 11 and averaged 11.4 points and 4.6 assists per game as a sophomore. On May 13, he was arrested in Evansville on misdemeanor charges of public intoxication, criminal mischief to a vehicle and disorderly conduct, before being released on $150 bond.

On August 4, 2017, Lyle announced that he would transfer to New Mexico. After sitting out one season due to NCAA transfer rules, he missed his entire next season with a ruptured Achilles tendon suffered during practice. Lyle was placed in a leading role for New Mexico when he returned in his senior season. On November 13, 2019, he scored a career-high 31 points, including 20 in the second half, in a 93–78 win over Green Bay. He scored 31 points again while recording six assists in an 80–78 victory over Boise State. On January 29, 2020, Lyle was suspended for two games after renting out an Airbnb for a party that was the site of a shooting. As a senior, Lyle averaged 14.9 points, 4.2 rebounds and 4.6 assists per game, leading his team in scoring and assists. He was a two-time Mountain West Player of the Week and was an All-Mountain West Honorable Mention selection by the media.

== Professional career ==
On August 16, 2020, Lyle signed his first professional contract with Kolossos Rodou of the Greek Basket League. On November 23, 2020, Lyle parted ways with the Greek club. In two games, he averaged 14.5 points, 2.5 rebounds, and 2.5 assists per game. On August 30, 2021, Lyle signed with Cañeros del Este of the Liga Nacional de Baloncesto.

Lyle was selected in the second round of the 2021 NBA G League draft with the 51st overall pick by the Santa Cruz Warriors.
