= Gary Chivichyan =

Armenian-American professional basketball player

Free agent
- Position: Guard

Personal information
- Born: July 17, 1996 (age 30) Los Angeles, California
- Listed height: 6 ft 4 in (1.93 m)
- Listed weight: 200 lb (91 kg)

Career information
- High school: Middlebrooks Academy (Los Angeles, California)
- College: Idaho State (2015–2018); Pacific (2018–2020)
- NBA draft: 2020: undrafted
- Playing career: 2021–present

Career history
- 2021: Stockton Kings
- 2021: Agua Caliente Clippers
- 2022: Agua Caliente Clippers
- 2023: Seattle Super Hawks
- 2023-: Homenetmen Beirut

Gary Chivichyan (born July 17, 1996) is an Armenian-American professional basketball player. In 2021, he became the first Armenian to be drafted to the NBA, selected with the 7th pick in the second round of the 2021 NBA G League draft. Chivichyan was also the first Armenian nominated for an ESPN ESPYS award. He played college basketball for the Pacific Tigers under former NBA star Damon Stoudamire and attended Idaho State University, both Division I programs where he received full athletic scholarships.

== College career ==
Nicknamed the "Armenian Sniper", he was one of the most prolific long-range shooters in Idaho State history, ranking fourth all-time in made three-point field goals (175) and three-point attempts (433), while finishing seventh all-time with a 40.4 three-point field goal percentage. He sank 62 three pointers in 2018–19 while shooting 41.1 percent from beyond the arc, and averaged 2.1 made three-pointers per game, while shooting 41.8 percent from the field for his career, and 70.3 from the free throw line.

Chivichyan was ranked sixth in the West Coast Conference in threes per game (1.88) and fourth on the team with a .387 three-point percentage while with the Tigers. He was the second leading scorer on a deep 13 man roster team and made 32 appearances as a tiger while shooting 38.3 percent from the floor. Known for his timely perimeter shooting, he sank a deep three to force a third overtime in an instant classic against Saint Mary's (1/4) as part of a season-high 19-point performance.

== Professional career ==
=== Stockton Kings (2021) ===
After going undrafted in the 2020 NBA draft, Chivichyan was selected 35th overall by the Lakeland Magic in the 2021 NBA G League draft and subsequently traded to the Iowa Wolves. However he was waived on November 4. On November 22, he signed with the Stockton Kings, but was waived on December 6 after one game.

=== Agua Caliente Clippers (2021) ===
Three days later, he was claimed off waivers by the Agua Caliente Clippers. He was then waived on January 30, 2022.

=== Return to Agua Caliente Clippers (2022) ===
On February 23, 2022, Chivichyan was reacquired via available player pool by the Agua Caliente Clippers. He was then later waived on February 28, 2022.

=== Lebanese Basketball League with Homenetmen Beirut (2023-) ===
Following his G League tenure, Chivichyan signed with a team in the Lebanese Basketball League (LBL), widely regarded as the premier professional basketball league in the Middle East. He competed in the Dubai International Championship, where he played alongside notable players such as Dwight Howard and Andray Blatche. Chivichyan delivered a standout performance in the tournament, leading all players in three-pointers made in a single game (8) and finishing with 26 points. In the 2024–25 season, Chivichyan returned to the LBL, averaging over 16 points per game while shooting above 40% from three-point range and 58% from inside the arc. His shooting efficiency and scoring ability established him as one of the league's top perimeter threats. He earned a selection to the LBL All-Star Game, further solidifying his reputation as one of the most effective shooters in the region.

== National team career ==
Chivichyan plays for the Armenia national basketball team.

== Career statistics ==
Idaho State University (BIG SKY) - Head Coach Bill Evans

- Freshmen of the year runner up
- Fourth all time in 3PT FG made
- Top 50 in NCAA TS%
- 40%+ 3PT For Career
- Led Idaho State to its first winning season in over a decade

Pacific University (WCC) - Head Coach Damon Stodaumire

- Top 10 in WCC 3PT Made ‘2020
- Second Leading Scorer on team
- Led Pacific to most wins in regular season (23 wins)
