= The Odd Get Even =

Studio album by Shadowfax
- Released: April 17, 1990
- Recorded: August 1989, Alpha Studios, North Hollywood, CA; Amigo Studios, North Hollywood
- Genre: New-age, jazz
- Length: 43:42
- Label: Private Music
- Producer: Robert Margouleff and Shadowfax

Shadowfax chronology
Folksongs for a Nuclear Village (1988)	The Odd Get Even (1990)	Esperanto (1992)

Professional ratings
Review scores
Source	Rating
Allmusic	link

The Odd Get Even is the seventh studio album by new-age/jazz group Shadowfax.

== Track listing ==
1. "Oasis" (David Lewis) – 5:07
2. "One Winter Morning" (Chuck Greenberg) – 4:10
3. "1001 Nights" (Charles Bisharat) – 4:25
4. "A Pause in the Rain" (Greenberg) – 3:53
5. "Her Dress Hangs There" (Stuart Nevitt, G. E. Stinson) – 5:12
6. "Changing of the Guard" (Bisharat) – 3:32
7. "Boomerang" (Lewis) – 4:15
8. "The Odd Get Even" (Nevitt, Stinson) – 3:32
9. "Sujata" (Stinson) – 5:23
10. "One Heart" (Phil Maggini) – 4:13

== Personnel ==
- Charles Bisharat – electric MIDI violin, viola, Oberheim Matrix-1000, Kawai K1R, Yamaha TX-81Z
- David Lewis – synclavier, Kawai K1 II, Kawai K1 R, Kawai K5, Roland Super Jupiter, Roland D-50, Roland D-550, Roland Axis, Yamaha TX802, Yamaha TX7, Yamaha DX7, E-mu Emax, Ensoniq VFX, grand piano, synthesizers
- Stuart Nevitt – drums, cymbals, ewe drums, Ensoniq EPS, DrumKAT programming; om chimes, Bushman rattles, Virginia rain shaker, tbilat, angklung, Ethiopian shaman rattles, Nigerian metal shakers, sampled tabla, udu, caxixis, bass drum
- G. E. Stinson – guitars, mbira, angklung, Moroccan tambourine, voice
- Chuck Greenberg – Lyricon, soprano saxophone, C Concert, alto and wood flutes
- Phil Maggini – electric basses, fretless bass

=== Additional personnel ===
- John Bergamo – tabla on 1, percussion on 7
- John Bisharat – cello on 10
- Robert Margouleff, Brant Biles – recording and mixing Engineer

== Charts ==
Chart (1990)	Peak position
US Top New Age Albums (Billboard)	3
