= 31st Annual Grammy Awards =

1989 US music awards ceremony

- Date: February 22, 1989
- Location: Shrine Auditorium, Los Angeles
- Hosted by: Billy Crystal
- Most awards: Bobby McFerrin (4)
- Most nominations: Tracy Chapman (6)

Television/radio coverage
- Network: CBS

The 31st Annual Grammy Awards were held on February 22, 1989, at Shrine Auditorium, Los Angeles. They recognized accomplishments by musicians from the previous year. This was also the first Grammy Awards Ceremony with a separate rap section.

Album of the Year went to George Michael for Faith, and Song of the Year went to Bobby McFerrin for "Don't Worry, Be Happy".

== Presenters ==
- The Manhattan Transfer - Best Pop Vocal Performance Female
- Vanessa Williams & Huey Lewis - Best Pop Vocal Performance Duo or Group
- Kool Moe Dee & Karyn White - Best R&B Vocal Performance Male
- Steve Winwood & Randy Travis - Best New Artist
- Ruben Blades - Best Mexican American Performance
- Henry Mancini & Olivia Newton-John - Song of the Year
- Jody Watley & Michael Hutchence - Best Rock Vocal Performance Female
- Quincy Jones & Gloria Estefan - Album of the Year
- Lita Ford & Alice Cooper - Best Hard Rock/Metal Performance
- Natalie Cole & David Sanborn - Best Jazz Vocal Performance Male
- Herb Alpert & Teddy Pendergrass - Record of the Year

== Performers ==
Artist(s)	Song(s)
Whitney Houston	"One Moment in Time"
The Manhattan Transfer	"She's the Most"
Luther Vandross	"She Won't Talk to Me"
Sinéad O'Connor	"Mandinka"
Linda Ronstadt	"Rogaciano El Huapanguero"
Bobby McFerrin & Billy Crystal	A capella and jokes
Melissa Etheridge	"Bring Me Some Water"
Dan Seals	"Addicted"
K. T. Oslin	"Hold Me"
Lyle Lovett and His Large Band	"She's Hot to Go"
Buck Owens & Dwight Yoakam	"Streets of Bakersfield"
Take 6	"If We Ever Needed the Lord Before (We Sure Do Need Him Now)"
Ronald Winans Family & Friends Choir	"Gotta Keep Dancin'"
Toni Childs	"Don't Walk Away"
Leontyne Price	"Tu? Tu? Piccolo Iddio!" (from Madama Butterfly by Giacomo Puccini)
Dizzy Gillespie	
Sarah Vaughan	"So Many Stars"
Metallica	"One"
Itzhak Perlman	
Tracy Chapman	"Fast Car"

== Award winners ==
=== General ===
Record of the Year

- Don't Worry, Be Happy - Bobby McFerrin
  - Linda Goldstein (producer)
- Fast Car - Tracy Chapman
  - David Kershenbaum (producer)
- Giving You The Best That I Got - Anita Baker
  - Michael J. Powell (producer)
- Man In The Mirror - Michael Jackson
  - Michael Jackson & Quincy Jones (producer)
- Roll With It - Steve Winwood
  - Tom Lord-Alge & Steve Winwood (producers)

Album of the Year

- Faith - George Michael
  - George Michael (producer)
- ...Nothing Like The Sun - Sting
  - Neil Dorfsman & Sting (producers)
- Roll With It - Steve Winwood
  - Tom Lord-Alge & Steve Winwood (producers)
- Simple Pleasures - Bobby McFerrin
  - Linda Goldstein & Bobby McFerrin (producers)
- Tracy Chapman - Tracy Chapman
  - David Kershenbaum (producer)

Song of the Year

- Don't Worry, Be Happy - Bobby McFerrin
  - Bobby McFerrin (songwriter)
- Be Still My Beating Heart - Sting
  - Sting (songwriter)
- Fast Car - Tracy Chapman
  - Tracy Chapman (songwriter)
- Giving You The Best That I Got - Anita Baker
  - Anita Baker, Randy Holland & Skip Scarborough (songwriters)
- Piano In The Dark - Brenda Russell
  - Scott Cutler, Jeff Hull & Brenda Russell (songwriters)

Best New Artist

- Tracy Chapman
- Take 6
- Vanessa Williams
- Rick Astley
- Toni Childs

=== Blues ===
- Best Traditional Blues Recording
  - Willie Dixon for Hidden Charms
- Best Contemporary Blues Recording
  - The Robert Cray Band for Don't Be Afraid of the Dark

=== Children's ===
- Best Recording for Children
  - Ry Cooder (producer & composer), Mark Sottnick (producer) & Robin Williams for Pecos Bill

=== Classical ===
- Best Orchestral Recording
  - Robert Woods (producer), Louis Lane, Robert Shaw (conductors) & the Atlanta Symphony Orchestra for Rorem: String Symphony; Sunday Morning; Eagles
- Best Classical Vocal Soloist Performance
  - Emerson Buckley (conductor), Luciano Pavarotti & the Symphony Orchestra of Amelia Romangna for Luciano Pavarotti in Concert
- Best Opera Recording
  - Christopher Raeburn (producer), Georg Solti (conductor), Plácido Domingo, Dietrich Fischer-Dieskau, Siegmund Nimsgern, Jessye Norman, Eva Randová, Hans Sotin, & the Vienna State Opera Orchestra for Wagner: Lohengrin
- Best Choral Performance (other than opera)
  - Robert Shaw (conductor) & the Atlanta Symphony Orchestra & Chorus for Verdi: Requiem & Operatic Choruses
- Best Classical Performance - Instrumental Soloist(s) (with orchestra)
  - Carlo Maria Giulini (conductor), Vladimir Horowitz & the La Scala Opera Orchestra for Mozart: Piano Concerto No. 23
- Best Classical Performance - Instrumental Soloist (without orchestra)
  - Alicia de Larrocha for Albéniz: Iberia, Navarra, Suite Espagnola
- Best Chamber Music Performance
  - David Corkhill, Evelyn Glennie, Murray Perahia & Georg Solti for Bartók: Sonata for Two Pianos & Percussion
- Best Contemporary Composition
  - John Adams (composer), Edo de Waart (conductor) & the Orchestra of St. Luke's for Adams: Nixon in China
- Best Classical Album
  - Robert Woods (producer), Robert Shaw (conductor) & the Atlanta Symphony Orchestra & Chorus for Verdi: Requiem & Operatic Choruses

=== Comedy ===
- Best Comedy Recording
  - Robin Williams for Good Morning Vietnam

=== Composing and arranging ===
- Best Instrumental Composition
  - Mike Post (composer) for "The Theme from L.A. Law"
- Best Song Written Specifically for a Motion Picture or Television
  - Phil Collins and Lamont Dozier (songwriters) for "Two Hearts" performed by Phil Collins
- Best Album of Original Instrumental Background Score Written for a Motion Picture or Television
  - David Byrne, Cong Su, and Ryuichi Sakamoto (composers) for The Last Emperor
- Best Arrangement on an Instrumental
  - Roger Kellaway (arranger) for "Memos From Paradise" performed by Eddie Daniels
- Best Instrumental Arrangement Accompanying Vocal(s)
  - Jonathan Tunick (arranger) for "No One Is Alone" performed by Cleo Laine

=== Country ===
- Best Country Vocal Performance, Female
  - K.T. Oslin for "Hold Me"
- Best Country Vocal Performance, Male
  - Randy Travis for Old 8x10
- Best Country Performance by a Duo or Group with Vocal
  - The Judds for "Give a Little Love"
- Best Country Vocal Collaboration
  - k.d. lang & Roy Orbison for "Crying"
- Best Country Instrumental Performance (orchestra, group or soloist)
  - Asleep at the Wheel for "Sugarfoot Rag"
- Best Country Song
  - K.T. Oslin (songwriter) for "Hold Me"
- Best Bluegrass Recording (vocal or instrumental)
  - Bill Monroe for Southern Flavor

=== Folk ===
- Best Traditional Folk Recording
  - Don DeVito, Harold Leventhal, Joe McEwen & Ralph Rinzler (producers) for Folkways - A Vision Shared: A Tribute to Woody Guthrie & Leadbelly performed by various artists
- Best Contemporary Folk Recording
  - Tracy Chapman for Tracy Chapman

=== Gospel ===
- Best Gospel Performance, Female
  - Amy Grant for Lead Me On
- Best Gospel Performance, Male
  - Larnelle Harris for Christmas
- Best Gospel Performance by a Duo or Group, Choir or Chorus
  - The Winans for The Winans Live at Carnegie Hall
- Best Soul Gospel Performance, Female
  - Aretha Franklin for One Lord, One Faith, One Baptism
- Best Soul Gospel Performance, Male
  - BeBe Winans for "Abundant Life"
- Best Soul Gospel Performance by a Duo or Group, Choir or Chorus
  - Take 6 for Take 6

=== Historical ===
- Best Historical Album
  - Bill Levenson (producer) for Crossroads performed by Eric Clapton

=== Jazz ===
- Best Jazz Vocal Performance, Female
  - Betty Carter for Look What I Got!
- Best Jazz Vocal Performance, Male
  - Bobby McFerrin for "Brothers"
- Best Jazz Vocal Performance, Duo or Group
  - Take 6 for "Spread Love"
- Best Jazz Instrumental Performance Soloist (On a Jazz Recording)
  - Michael Brecker for Don't Try This at Home
- Best Jazz Instrumental Performance, Group
  - Roy Haynes, Cecil McBee, David Murray, Pharoah Sanders & McCoy Tyner for Blues for Coltrane: A Tribute to John Coltrane
- Best Jazz Instrumental Performance, Big Band
  - Gil Evans for Bud and Bird performed by Gil Evans & the Monday Night Orchestra
- Best Jazz Fusion Performance
  - Yellowjackets for Politics

=== Latin ===
- Best Latin Pop Performance
  - Roberto Carlos for Roberto Carlos
- Best Tropical Latin Performance
  - Rubén Blades for Antecedente
- Best Mexican-American Performance
  - Linda Ronstadt for Canciones de Mi Padre

=== Musical show ===
- Best Musical Cast Show Album
  - Stephen Sondheim (composer & lyricist), Jay David Saks (producer), & various artists for Into the Woods

=== Music video ===
- Best Concept Music Video
  - "Weird Al" Yankovic, Jay Levey (director), Susan Zwerman (producer) for Fat
- Best Performance Music Video
  - U2, Meiert Avis (director), Ben Dossett, Michael Hamlyn (producers) for Where The Streets Have No Name

=== New Age ===
- Best New Age Performance
  - Shadowfax for Folksongs for a Nuclear Village (Band members: Charles Bisharat, Chuck Greenberg, David Lewis, Phil Maggini, Stuart Nevitt, G. E. Stinson).

=== Packaging and notes ===
- Best Album Package
  - Bill Johnson (art director) for Tired of Runnin' performed by The O'Kanes
- Best Album Notes
  - Anthony DeCurtis (notes writer) for Crossroads performed by Eric Clapton

=== Polka ===
- Best Polka Recording
  - Jimmy Sturr for Born to Polka

=== Pop ===
- Best Pop Vocal Performance, Female
  - Tracy Chapman for "Fast Car"
- Best Pop Vocal Performance, Male
  - Bobby McFerrin for "Don't Worry, Be Happy"
- Best Pop Performance by a Duo or Group with Vocal
  - The Manhattan Transfer for Brasil
- Best Pop Instrumental Performance (Orchestra, Group Or Soloist)
  - David Sanborn for Close Up

=== Production and engineering ===
- Best Engineered Recording, Non-Classical
  - Tom Lord-Alge (engineer) for Roll With It performed by Steve Winwood
- Best Engineered Recording, Classical
  - Jack Renner (engineer), Robert Shaw (conductor) & the Atlanta Symphony Orchestra for Verdi: Requiem & Operatic Choruses
- Producer of the Year, (Non-Classical)
  - Neil Dorfsman
- Classical Producer of the Year
  - Robert Woods

=== R&B ===
- Best R&B Vocal Performance, Female
  - Anita Baker for "Giving You the Best That I Got"
- Best R&B Vocal Performance, Male
  - Terence Trent D'Arby for Introducing the Hardline According to Terence Trent D'Arby
- Best R&B Performance by a Duo or Group with Vocal
  - Gladys Knight & the Pips for "Love Overboard"
- Best R&B Instrumental Performance (Orchestra, Group or Soloist)
  - Chick Corea for "Light Years"
- Best Rhythm & Blues Song
  - Anita Baker, Randy Holland & Skip Scarborough (songwriters) for "Giving You the Best That I Got" performed by Anita Baker

=== Rap ===
Best Rap Performance

- "Parents Just Don't Understand" – DJ Jazzy Jeff & The Fresh Prince
- "Supersonic" – J. J. Fad
- "Wild Wild West" – Kool Moe Dee
- "Going Back to Cali" – LL Cool J
- "Push It" – Salt-n-Pepa

=== Reggae ===
- Best Reggae Recording
  - Ziggy Marley & the Melody Makers for Conscious Party

=== Rock ===
- Best Rock Vocal Performance, Female
  - Tina Turner for Tina Live in Europe
- Best Rock Vocal Performance, Male
  - Robert Palmer for "Simply Irresistible"
- Best Rock Performance by a Duo or Group with Vocal
  - U2 for "Desire"
- Best Rock Instrumental Performance (Orchestra, Group or Soloist)
  - Carlos Santana for Blues for Salvador
- Best Hard Rock/Metal Performance Vocal or Instrumental
  - Jethro Tull for Crest of a Knave

=== Spoken ===
- Best Spoken Word or Non-musical Recording
  - Jesse Jackson for Speech by Rev. Jesse Jackson

== Trivia ==
- The Rap Field was added to the Grammy Awards in 1989.
- Sinéad O'Connor painted the logo of the hip hop group Public Enemy on her head to protest the first-ever Best Rap Performance award being conferred off-screen.
- The Best Metal/Hard Rock award was also added this year, and Jethro Tull infamously won the award over the heavily favored Metallica.
