= The Dreams of Children =

Studio album by Shadowfax
- Released: October 1984
- Genre: New-age, jazz
- Length: 36:45
- Label: Windham Hill
- Producer: Chuck Greenberg

Shadowfax chronology
Shadowdance (1983)	The Dreams of Children (1984)	Too Far to Whisper (1986)

Professional ratings
Review scores
Source	Rating
AllMusic	3/5 stars
The Rolling Stone Jazz Record Guide	3/5 stars

The Dreams of Children is the fourth studio album by new-age group Shadowfax, the third for Windham Hill Records.

== Track listing ==
1. "Another Country" (Chuck Greenberg) – 4:20
2. "Snowline" (Greenberg) – 4:30
3. "The Big Song" (David C. Lewis, G. E. Stinson) – 4:00
4. "The Dreams of Children" (Greenberg) – 4:50
5. "Word from the Village" (Stinson) – 4:40
6. "Kindred Spirits" (Stinson) – 4:15
7. "Shaman Song" (Phil Maggini) – 5:20
8. "Above the Wailing Wall" (Stinson) – 4:50

== Personnel ==
- G. E. Stinson – 6- and 12-string guitar, effects vocals
- Chuck Greenberg – Lyricon, tenor saxophone, soprano saxophone, stone flute
- Phil Maggini – bass
- Stuart Nevitt – drums, percussion, boobams
- Jamii Szmadzinski – violin, baritone violin
- David C. Lewis – Yamaha DX7, Memorymoog, Steinway grand piano

=== Additional personnel ===
- Morris Dollison – vocal on 5, guitar on 1
- Michael Spiro – bàtá drums on 1, crotales on 1 2, caxixi on 1, bells on 2, chimes on 2
- Hara Lambi A. – vocal on 8
- Adam Rudolph – shekere on 5 7, talking drums on 5, clay pots on 7, caxixi on 7, turtle shell on 7, fra fra bell on 7 8, berimbau on 7, clay drums on 8, angklung on 8, cowbells on 8, rattles on 8

== Charts ==
Chart (1984)	Peak position
Billboard 200	126
Billboard Top Jazz Albums	10
