= Esperanto (Shadowfax album) =

Studio album by Shadowfax
- Released: 15 September 1992
- Genre: New-age, jazz
- Length: 45:03
- Label: Earthbeat!
- Producer: Chuck Greenberg and Harry Andronis

Shadowfax chronology
The Odd Get Even (1990)	Esperanto (1992)	Magic Theater (1994)

Professional ratings
Review scores
Source	Rating
AllMusic	link

Esperanto is the eighth studio album by new-age/jazz group Shadowfax. It was nominated for the Grammy Award for Best New Age Album in 1993, losing out to Enya's Shepherd Moons.

The cover art is by Mimi LaPlant.

== Track listing ==
1. "The Return of the Nairobi Trio" (Chuck Greenberg) – 5:12
2. "Neither Here Nor There" (Armen Chakmakian, Greenberg) – 5:31
3. "Foundwind" (Phil Maggini) – 5:02
4. "Moonskater" (Greenberg, Chakmakian) – 4:19
5. "Tropico Blue" (Greenberg) – 3:54
6. "Tanah Lot" (Maggini) – 5:07
7. "Duet for Shar" (Maggini) – 5:44
8. "Include Me Out" (Stuart Nevitt, Eric Gabriel) – 4:46
9. "Blue in the Face" (Nevitt) – 5:28

== Personnel ==
- Chuck Greenberg – Lyricon and WX-7 wind synthesizers, soprano saxophone, C-Concert, alto, Chilean, Indian and African flutes, bass clarinet
- Stu Nevitt – drums, cymbals, DrumKAT Controller Axis – E Pedal, Ensoniq EPS & EPS 16+ Samplers, Kawai XD-5 & K4 Modules, sampled & synthesized talking drum on "Neither Here Nor There", balafons on "Include Me Out"; tbilat, castanets, tambourine, Bushman dance rattles and hand claps
- Phil Maggini – electric bass, additional keyboards
- Armen Chakmakian – grand piano, Korg M1, Roland U-20, Ensoniq EPS 16+, Roland D-50

=== Additional personnel ===
- L. Shankar – vocals on 6, double violin on 6
- Emil Richards – dumbek on 1 6, flapamba on 1 5 6, pipe gamelan on 1 6, Moroccan tambourine on 1, sampled bass marimba on 3, udu on 5, kendang on 6, hand claps on 6, crotales on 6, sampled bass marimba on 6 and bass boobams on 6
- Cash McCall – guitar on 9
- Ramon Yslas – congas on 2 3 8, shekere on 2, udu on 2, triangle on 2, bongos on 3, hand percussion on 8

== Charts ==
Chart (1992)	Peak position
US Top Contemporary Jazz Albums (Billboard)	20
