= Shadowdance (Shadowfax album) =

Studio album by Shadowfax
- Released: November 1, 1983
- Recorded: 1983
- Genre: New-age, jazz
- Length: 37:50
- Label: Windham Hill Records
- Producer: Chuck Greenberg

Shadowfax chronology
| Shadowfax (1982) | Shadowdance (1983) | The Dreams of Children (1984) |

Professional ratings
Review scores
| Source | Rating |
|---|---|
| Allmusic | 4/5 stars |
| The Rolling Stone Jazz Record Guide | 3/5 stars |

Shadowdance is the third studio album by new-age group Shadowfax, the second for Windham Hill Records.

== Track listing ==
1. "New Electric India" (G. E. Stinson) – 5:12
2. "Watercourse Way" (Chuck Greenberg, Stinson) – 5:06
3. "Ghost Bird" (Stinson) – 5:04
4. "Shadowdance" (Greenberg) – 5:20
5. "Brown Rice/Karmapa Chenno" (Don Cherry) – 4:18
6. "Distant Voices" (Stinson, Greenberg) – 3:46
7. "A Song for My Brother" (Stinson) – 9:04

== Personnel ==
- G. E. Stinson – 6- and 12-string guitar, vocal on 5
- Chuck Greenberg – Lyricon, tenor saxophone, flute
- Phil Maggini – bass
- Stuart Nevitt – drums, percussion, vibraphone
- Jared Stewart – piano synthesizers
- Jamii Szmadzinski – violin, baritone violin, alto psaltry

=== Additional personnel ===
- Emil Richards – gamelan gongs on 4, bass flapamba on 4, metal and bamboo angklung on 4, wood block, marimba on 4, Chinese water cymbals on 1, kangjeera on 1, percussion conductor on 4
- Michael Spiro – conga on 5, shekere on 5, guiro on 5, hand percussion on 2 5
- Michael Lehocky – percussion on 4 5
- Adam Rudolph – tabla on 5

== Charts ==
| Chart (1983) | Peak position |
|---|---|
| US Top LPs & Tape (Billboard) | 145 |
| US Jazz LPs (Billboard) | 13 |
