= Shadowfax (album) =

Studio album by Shadowfax
- Released: 1982
- Recorded: May–June 1982, Studio America, Pasadena, CA
- Genre: Jazz, new-age
- Length: 34:49
- Label: Windham Hill Records
- Producer: Chuck Greenberg

Shadowfax chronology
Watercourse Way (1976)	Shadowfax (1982)	Shadowdance (1983)

Professional ratings
Review scores
Source	Rating
Allmusic	4.5/5 stars
The Rolling Stone Jazz Record Guide	3/5 stars

Shadowfax is the second album by Shadowfax, and the band's first for Windham Hill Records. Saxophonist Chuck Greenberg was introduced to Windham Hill CEO Will Ackerman by Ackerman's cousin Alex de Grassi. The band was signed to a record deal in early 1982.

== Track listing ==
1. "Angel's Flight" – Chuck Greenberg 4:05
2. "Vajra" – G.E. Stinson 4:26
3. "Wheel of Dreams" – G.E. Stinson & Chuck Greenberg 4:51
4. "Oriental Eyes" – Phil Maggini 4:59
5. "Move the Clouds" – G.E. Stinson 3:11
6. "A Thousand Teardrops" – Chuck Greenberg 4:21
7. "Ariki (Hummingbird Spirit)" G. E. Stinson & Chuck Greenberg – 3:18
8. "Marie" – G.E. Stinson 5:57

== Personnel ==
- G. E. Stinson – 12-string acoustic guitar, 6-string acoustic guitar, piano
- Chuck Greenberg – Lyricon, soprano saxophone
- Phil Maggini – bass
- Stuart Nevitt – drums, percussion

=== Additional personnel ===
- Emil Richards – windchimes on 1, bells on 1, contra bass marimba on 2 7, rhythm log on 2, bell tree on 2, tambourine on 2, vibes on 3, crotales on 3, kelon vibes anvil on 4, gong on 4, conga on 7, Thai vibes on 7, percussion ensemble arrangement
- Alex de Grassi – 12 string acoustic guitar on the right channel on 2
- Bruce Malament – Fender Rhodes on 4
- Jamii Szmadzinski – violin on 5 8, baritone violin on 5 8
- Scott Cossu – piano on 6

== Charts ==
Chart (1983)	Peak position
US Billboard Jazz Albums	19
