= Too Far to Whisper =

Too Far To Whisper

Studio album by Shadowfax
- Released: 1986
- Recorded: February 1986
- Genre: New-age, jazz
- Length: 41:43
- Label: Windham Hill Records
- Producer: Chuck Greenberg

Shadowfax chronology
The Dreams of Children (1984)	Too Far To Whisper (1986)	Folksongs for a Nuclear Village (1988)

Professional ratings
Review scores
Source	Rating
Allmusic	(no review)

Too Far To Whisper is the fifth studio album by new-age group Shadowfax, the fourth and final for Windham Hill Records.

== Track listing ==
1. "Too Far To Whisper" (G. E. Stinson) – 4:36
2. "What Goes Around" (Stinson) – 4:29
3. "China Blue" (Phil Maggini) – 4:11
4. "The Orangutan Gang (Strikes Back)" (David C. Lewis) – 3:53
5. "Road To Hanna" (Charlie Bisharat) – 4:08
6. "Streetnoise" (Greenberg) – 4:17
7. "Slim Limbs Akimbo" (Stuart Nevitt) – 4:03
8. "Tsunami" (Lewis) – 4:40
9. "Maceo" (Maggini) – 4:01
10. "Ritual" (Greenberg, Maggini, Stinson) – 3:44

== Personnel ==
- Chuck Greenberg – ocarina, soprano saxophone, tenor saxophone, wood flute, Lyricon
- Charlie Bisharat: violin, electric violin
- Phil Maggini: Electric bass, vocals
- Stuart Nevitt: percussion, drums, gong, marimbas, timbales, xylophone, balafon, vibes, octoban
- G. E. Stinson: guitar, vocals, tamboura, mbira
- David C. Lewis: synthesizer, piano, keyboards, Moog synthesizer

=== Additional personnel ===
- Adam Rudolph: percussion, conga, drums, tabla, batá, talking drum, bird calls, gudu gudu
- Morris Dollison: guitar, vocals
- Emil Richards: synthesizer, percussion, drums, gong, marimbas, steel drums, angklung, synthesized percussion, log drums, cabasa
- Hara Lambi A.: vocals, background vocals

== Charts ==
Chart (1986)	Peak position
US Billboard 200	118
US Top Jazz Albums (Billboard)	24
