= Shadowfax =

The name Shadowfax may refer to:

- Shadowfax (Middle-earth), a fictional horse ridden by Gandalf the wizard in J. R. R. Tolkien's Lord of the Rings
- Shadowfax (band), a new age/electronic musical group
  - Shadowfax (album), an album by this group
- Mount Shadowfax, a mountain in British Columbia
