= Watercourse Way =

Studio album by Shadowfax
- Released: 1976 / 1985
- Recorded: November 1975 / May 1985
- Length: 41:41
- Label: Passport/ABC, Windham Hill (1985 reissue)

Shadowfax chronology
| Watercourse Way (1976) | Shadowfax (1982) |

Watercourse Way is the debut album by Chicago progressive rock/new-age band Shadowfax, released in 1976 on Passport Records (and subsequently re-released by Windham Hill in 1985).

== Track listing ==
1. "The Shape of a Word" (G. E. Stinson) – 7:29
2. "Linear Dance" (Stinson) – 5:51
3. "Petite Aubade" (Chuck Greenberg, Stinson) – 5:59
4. "Book of Hours" (Doug Maluchnik) – 6:37
5. "Watercourse Way" (Greenberg, Stinson) – 6:04
6. "Song for My Brother" (Stinson) – 9:41

== Personnel ==
Shadowfax

- G. E. Stinson – 12-string acoustic guitar, classical guitar, electric guitar, sitar, vocals
- Chuck Greenberg – Lyricon, soprano saxophone, flute, oboe, recorder, bass clarinet
- Doug Maluchnik – piano, synthesizer, harpsichord
- Phil Maggini – double bass, electric bass, bells
- Stuart Nevitt – drums, percussion, tabla
