= Chuck Greenberg =

Chuck Greenberg may refer to:

- Chuck Greenberg (musician) (1950–1995), American musical artist, composer and producer
- Chuck Greenberg (businessman) (born 1961), American sports attorney and former minority owner of the Texas Rangers baseball team
