= Adam Rudolph =

American jazz composer and percussionist

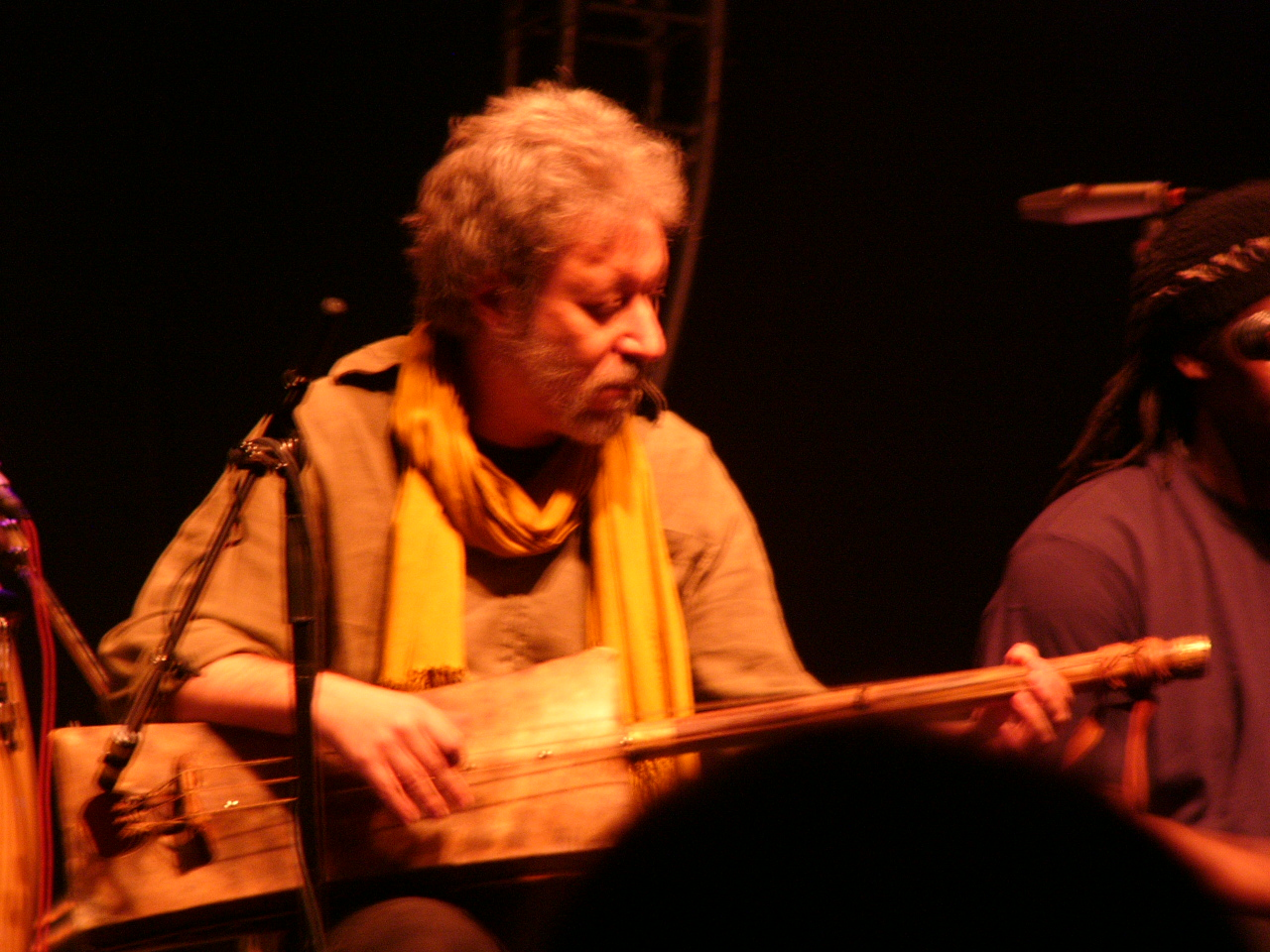
- Adam Rudolph and his Moving Pictures perform in 2006.

Background information
- Born: September 12, 1955 (age 71); Hyde Park, Chicago, Illinois
- Genres: World fusion, African music
- Occupation: Musician
- Instrument: Percussion
- Label: Meta

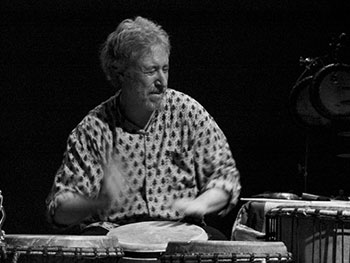
Adam Rudolph

Adam Rudolph (born September 12, 1955) is a jazz composer and percussionist performing in the post-bop and world fusion media.

Rudolph grew up in the South Side of Chicago among jazz and blues musicians. In 1988 he met jazz musician Yusef Lateef, and the two would go on to collaborate and perform together for the next 25 years. In 1992 Rudolph helped found the band Adam Rudolph’s Moving Pictures, “a malleable group of improvisers“, as Jazz Times described it. He has been the artistic director of and composer for Hu: Vibrational with Hamid Drake, Vashti International Percussion Ensemble and Go: Organic Orchestra. He has performed as half of the Wildflowers Duo with Butoh dance innovator Oguri.

Rudolph has released several albums as leader and has also recorded with musicians Sam Rivers, Omar Sosa, Wadada Leo Smith, Pharoah Sanders, Bill Laswell, Herbie Hancock, Foday Musa Suso, and Shadowfax.

== Discography ==
=== As leader ===
- Adam Rudolph's Moving Pictures (Flying Fish, 1992)
- Skyway (Soul Note, 1994)
- Contemplations (Meta, 1997)
- 12 Arrows (Meta, 1999)
- Go: Organic Orchestra: 1 (Meta, 2002)
- Web of Light (Meta, 2002)
- Dream Garden (Justin Time, 2008)
- Yeyi (Meta, 2010)
- Both/And (Meta, 2011)
- Merely a Traveler On the Cosmic Path (Meta, 2012)
- Glare of the Tiger (Meta, 2017)
- Focus and Field (Meta, 2020)
- Autumn Moon Meditation (Meta, 2024)

=== As co-leader ===
With Build an Ark

- Peace with Every Step (Kindred Spirits, 2004)
- Dawn (Kindred Spirits, 2007)

With Eternal Wind

- Eternal Wind (Flying Fish, 1984)
- Terra Incognita (Flying Fish, 1987)
- Wasalu (Flying Fish, 1988)

With Hu Vibrational

- Boonghee Music 1 (Eastern Developments, 2002)
- Beautiful Boonghee Music 2 (Soul Jazz, 2004)
- Universal Mother Boonghee Music 3 (Soul Jazz, 2006)
- The Epic Botanical Beat Suite Boonghee Music 4 (Meta, 2015)
- Timeless Boonghee Music 5 (Meta, 2023)

With Yusef Lateef

- Live in Seattle (YAL, 1999)

With Mandingo Griot Society

- Mandingo Griot Society (Flying Fish, 1978)
- Mighty Rhythm (Flying Fish, 1981)

With Bennie Maupin

- Symphonic Tone Poem for Brother Yusef (Strut, 2022)

With Universal Quartet

- The Universal Quartet (Blackout Music, 2009)
- Light (ILK Music, 2013)

=== As sideman ===
With Jon Hassell

- City: Works of Fiction (Opal, 1990)
- Dressing for Pleasure (Warner Bros., 1994)
- Seeing Through Sound (Ndeya, 2020)

With Bill Laswell

- Kauai: The Arch of Heaven (Metastation, 2014)
- Against Empire (M.O.D. Reloaded, 2020)

Dave Liebman

- The Unknowable (RareNoise, 2018)
- Chi (RareNoise, 2019)

With Yusef Lateef

- Tenors of Yusef Lateef and Archie Shepp (YAL, 1992)
- The African-American Epic Suite for Quintet and Orchestra (ACT, 1994) – rec. 1993
- The World at Peace (Meta, 1997)[2CD] – rec. 1995
- Beyond the Sky (YAL/Meta, 2000)
- A G.I.F.T. (A Goodness Inwardness Forgiving Tolerance) (YAL, 2000)
- Live at Luckman Theater (YAL, 2001)
- Towards the Unknown (Meta, 2010) – rec. 2009
- Voice Prints (Meta, 2013) – rec. 2008

With Shadowfax

- Shadowdance (Windham Hill, 1983)
- The Dreams of Children (Windham Hill, 1984)
- Too Far to Whisper (Windham Hill, 1986)

With Wadada Leo Smith

- Compassion (Meta, 2006) – rec. 2002
- Najwa (TUM TUM, 2017) – rec. 2014

With others

- Fred Anderson, The Missing Link (Nessa, 1984) – rec. 1979
- Bob Belden, Puccini's Turandot (Blue Note, 1993)
- Joseph Bowie, Good Medicine (Defunkt Music, 2013) – rec. 2011
- Henry Brant, The Henry Brant Collection Vol. 2 (Innova, 2004)
- Norman Connors, Passion (Capitol, 1988)
- Hamid Drake, Karuna (Meta, 2018)
- Hassan Hakmoun, Gift of the Gnawa (Flying Fish, 1991)
- Herbie Hancock, Jazz Africa (NEC Avenue, 1987)
- Hue and Cry, Remote (Circa, 1988)
- Sam Rivers, Vista (Meta, 2004)
- Ned Rothenberg, Overlays (Moers Music, 1991)
- Pharoah Sanders, Spirits (Meta, 2000)
- Claudia Schmidt, Claudia Schmidt (Flying Fish, 1979)
- Paul Shapiro, Shofarot Verses (Tzadik, 2014) – rec. 2013
- Avery Sharpe, Extended Family II Thoughts of My Ancestors (JKNM, 1995) – rec. 1994
- Antonio Pinho Vargas, Selos E Borboletas (EMI, 1991)
