= Magic Theater =

Studio album by Shadowfax
- Released: 1994
- Recorded: June–July 1993
- Genre: New-age, jazz
- Length: 48:34
- Label: Earthbeat!
- Producer: Chuck Greenberg and Harry Andronis

Shadowfax chronology
Esperanto (1992)	Magic Theater (1994)	Live (1995)

Professional ratings
Review scores
Source	Rating
AllMusic	4/5 stars

Magic Theater is the tenth studio album by the new-age/jazz group Shadowfax.

== Track listing ==
1. "Imaginary Islands" (Chuck Greenberg) – 4:23
2. "Hey! Your Hat's On Backwards" (Stuart Nevitt) – 4:52
3. "Secret Gathering" (Armen Chakmakian) – 5:06
4. "Ebony Wind" (Greenberg) – 4:38
5. "Castaneda's Boogie" (Phil Maggini) – 5:54
6. "Baker's Dozen" (Greenberg) – 4:46
7. "Night Passage" (Chakmakian) – 3:44
8. "Remembrance" (Maggini) – 3:53
9. "How Much Does Zimbabwe?" (Nevitt) – 4:54
10. "The Spirit Door" (Maggini) – 6:24

== Personnel ==
- Armen Chakmakian – keyboards, piano, synthesizer
- Chuck Greenberg – alto flute, Lyricon, soprano saxophone, tenor saxophone, woodwind
- Phil Maggini – bass guitar, upright bass, flute, fretless bass, keyboards, vocals
- Stuart Nevitt – bass guitar, electric bass, cymbals, drums, electric drums, snare drum, percussion, sound effects, vocals

=== Additional personnel ===
- Andy Abad – acoustic guitar, electric guitar
- Aaron Gross – dumbek
- Danny Heines – acoustic guitar, electric guitar, lap steel guitar
- Glenn Morrison – flugelhorn
- Ramon Yslas – bongos, chimes, congas, percussion, shaker, sound effects
