= Armen Chakmakian =

American jazz musician

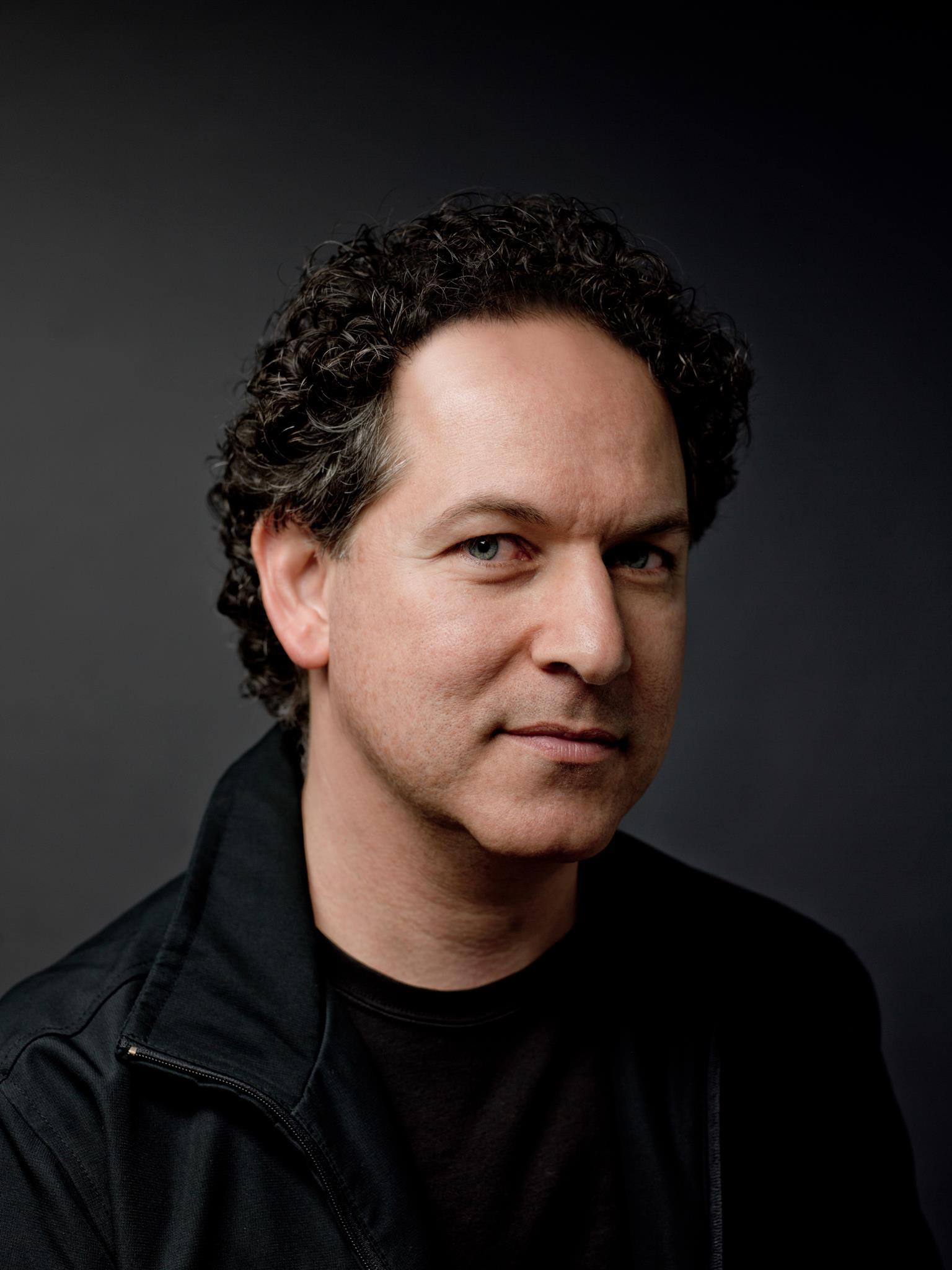
Armen Chakmakian

Armen John Chakmakian (born February 11, 1966 in Glendale, California) is an American musician, composer, recording artist, and producer. Formerly the keyboardist for the GRAMMY® award-winning band Shadowfax, their 1992 CD, Esperanto was nominated for a Best New Age Album GRAMMY® Award. He has released two solo albums on his label TruArt Records: Ceremonies (1998); Caravans (2004). Two tracks from Ceremonies, "Gypsy Rain" and "Distant Lands", also appear on the famed "Buddha Bar" and "Buddha Bar IV" compilation albums, respectively.

Armen's albums also feature oud player, violinist and composer John Bilezikjian, duduk master Djivan Gasparyan and former Windham Hill acoustic guitarist Alex De Grassi. In 2006 Armen toured South America with Cirque du Soleil's show, Saltimbanco and in 2017 he toured South America again as keyboardist and background vocalist with Roger Hodgson.

Currently, he composes music for television, performs his own concerts as well as performs for other artists and productions.

== Discography ==
- 1998 Ceremonies (TruArt Records)
- 2004 Caravans (TruArt Records)

=== With Chuck Greenberg ===
- 2018 Into The Blue (single, Greenberg Music)

=== With Shadowfax ===
- 1992 Esperanto (EarthBeat Records)
- 1994 Magic Theater (EarthBeat Records)
- 1995 Shadowfax Live (Sonic Images)

With Big E and the Wild Hairs

- 2024, Southern Star (independently released)

== See also ==
List of Armenian-Americans
