= MalletKAT =

Digital percussion instrument

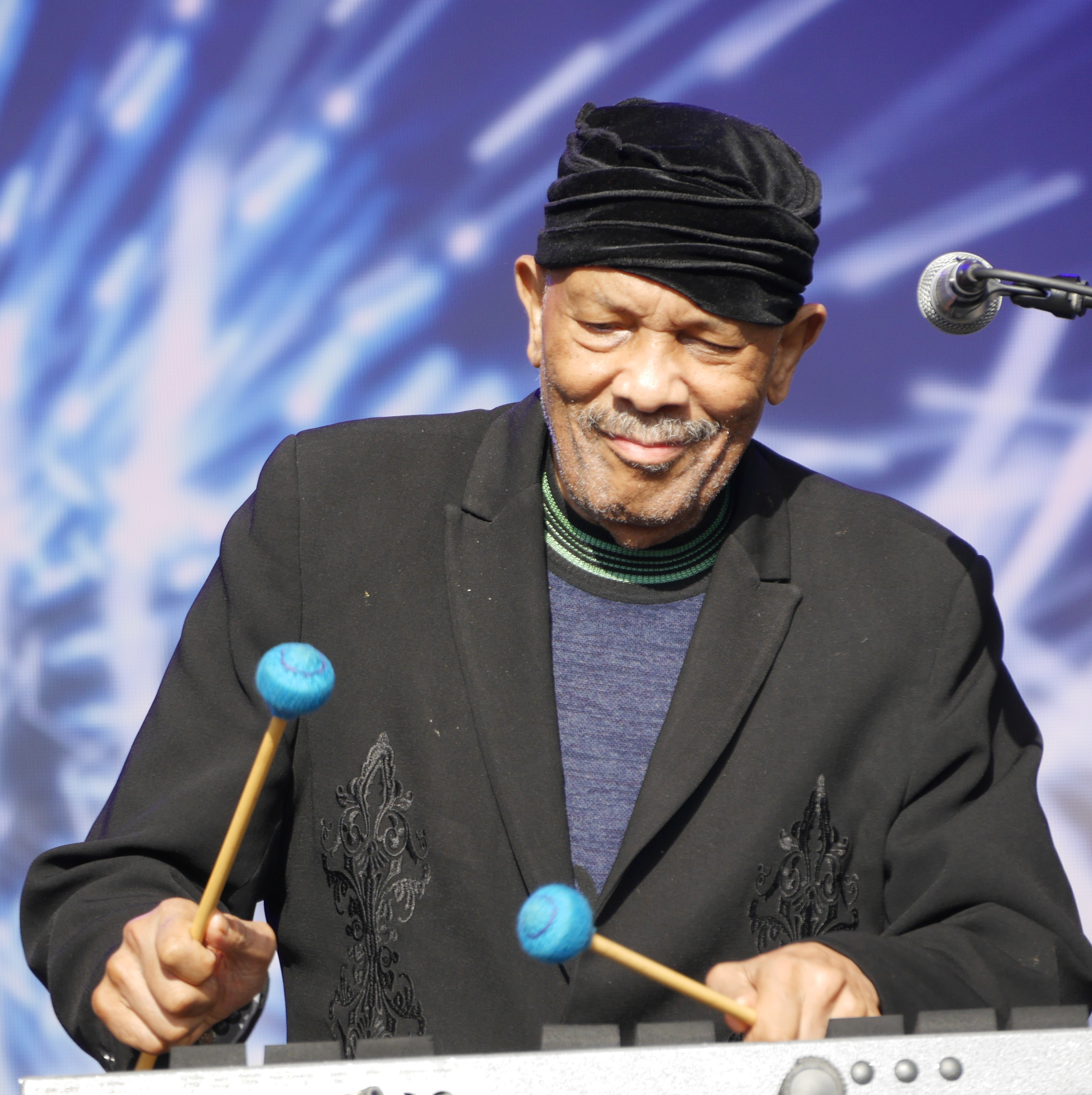
Roy Ayers playing a MalletKAT (2019)

The MalletKAT is a musical instrument in a class of MIDI percussion controllers which also includes the DrumKAT, DK10, and TrapKat.

== Description ==
The Control Surface is a velocity-sensitive gum-rubber pad that has force-sensing resistors (FSR) which detect and convert mechanical energy into electrical signals. The trigger pads are laid out like a conventional marimba. The MalletKAT is made by the company Alternate Mode. Alternate Mode also makes the DrumKAT, DK-10, TrapKAT, and the PanKAT. The MalletKAT is a MIDI controller which can be directed to a sound module and to an amp or to a computer with a MIDI interface if needed. Pedals are also provided with the MalletKAT.

== Controller ==
The MalletKAT comes in three main models: the MalletKAT Express, the MalletKAT Pro and the MalletKAT Grand. Neil Peart, the drummer from the rock band Rush, used a MalletKAT Express. The Controller's FSR technology allows it to be extremely sensitive to any touch, and can recognize damping, tapping, etc. Performers can program the MalletKAT by depressing an "Edit" footswitch and then choosing functions to edit based on text written beneath the pads. They can then use pads marked "Increment," "Decrement," "Forward," and "Backward" to change settings.

== Sound source ==
The sound source provides the sound for the MalletKat. One sound source commonly used is a Sound Module. The Sound Module is a MIDI device which the malletkat gets directed to via a MIDI cable. One can also use a computer instead of a sound module.

== See also ==
- Marimba Lumina, a specialized MIDI control device
- Moonlight Feels Right (marimba solo)
