= Emil Richards =

American vibraphonist and percussionist (1932–2019)

- Born: Emilio Joseph Radocchia; September 2, 1932; Hartford, Connecticut, U.S.
- Died: December 13, 2019 (aged 87)
- Genres: Jazz; classical; rock
- Occupations: Musician; collector
- Instruments: Vibraphone; percussion

Emil Richards (born Emilio Joseph Radocchia; September 2, 1932 – December 13, 2019) was an American vibraphonist and percussionist.

== Biography ==
=== Early life ===
Richards was born in Hartford, Connecticut to Italian immigrant parents who ran a meat market.

=== Musician ===
Richards began playing the xylophone aged six. In High School, he performed with the Hartford Symphony Orchestra. He studied with Al Lepak at the Hartt School of Music in Hartford, graduating in 1952. After being drafted, he belonged to an Army band in Japan and played with Toshiko Akiyoshi. He cited Lionel Hampton as his first and biggest influence on vibraphone.

In 1954, Richards moved to New York City, where he played with Charles Mingus, Ed Shaughnessy, and Ed Thigpen while doing studio recordings for Perry Como, the Ray Charles Singers, and Mitchell Ayres. For about three years, he was a member of a group led by George Shearing, then moved to Los Angeles and worked with Don Ellis and Paul Horn. He led his own band, the Microtonal Blues Band, and spent time with composer and inventor Harry Partch. As a sideman, he accompanied George Harrison on tour and recorded with Frank Sinatra, Frank Zappa, Doris Day, Judy Garland, Nelson Riddle, Steely Dan, and Sarah Vaughan.

Richards worked often as a studio musician for movies and television. His credits include playing bongos on the theme song for the television program Mission: Impossible. Other television work included finger snaps for the Addams Family theme, and xylophone work for the opening theme of The Simpsons. He led a band with Joe Porcaro, and he released a solo album, The Wonderful World of Percussion. His mallet pupils included Morten Grønvad, Stan Levey and Bo Wagner. Richards died on December 13, 2019.

=== Collector ===
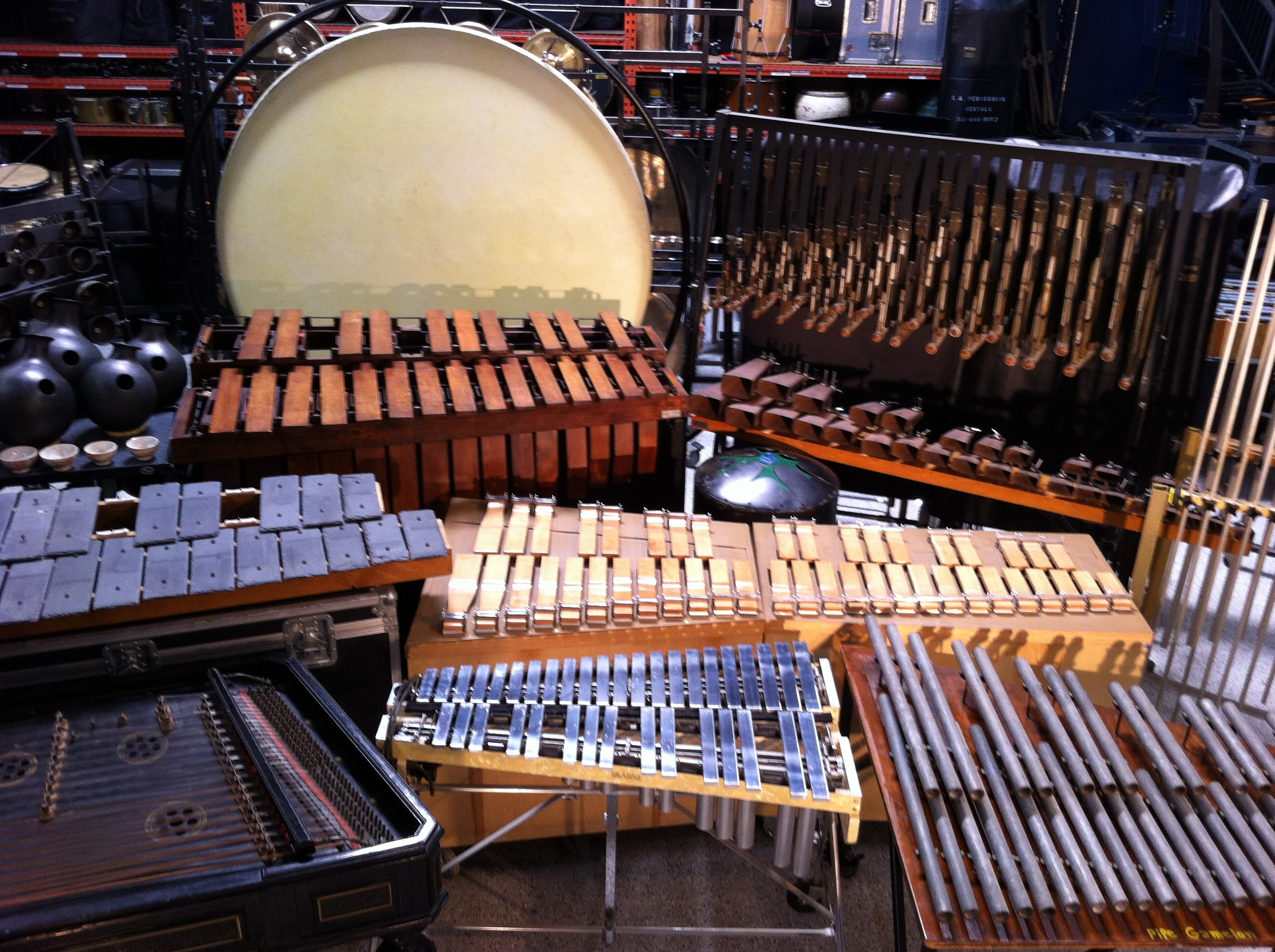
Percussion instruments from the Emil Richards Collection

In 1962, Richards went on a worldwide tour with Frank Sinatra to raise money for poor children. The tour increased Richards's fascination with ethnic percussion instruments. During his career, he collected over 350 instruments, many of them more common in the East than the West. Richards wanted his instruments to continue to be heard in recordings and other performances and to remain together as much as possible. The Emil Richards Collection includes common percussion, such as xylophone and marimba and exotic, such as the angklung, bulbul tarang, chimta, flapamba, jal tarang, janggu, lujon, mbira, and pakhavaj.

In 1992, he gave sixty-five instruments to the Percussive Arts Society museum in Lawton, Oklahoma. He was a member of the Society's Hall of Fame. Part of the collection was sold to Los Angeles Percussion Rentals. Many instruments were restored and are used in recordings and other performances in Los Angeles. LAPR works with Odd Art Fabrications to custom design and fabricate instruments and hardware such as chromatically tuned wood blocks and chromatically tuned bell plate.

== Discography ==
=== As leader ===
- Yazz Per Favore (Del-fi, 1961)
- New Sound Element Stones (Uni, 1967)
- New Time Element (Uni, 1967)
- Cosmic Sounds with the Zodiac (Elektra, 1967)
- Journey to Bliss (Impulse!, 1968)
- Spirit of 1976/Live at Donte's (Impulse!, 1969)
- Wonderful World of Percussion (Interworld, 1994)
- Luntana (Interworld, 1996)

With The Surfmen

- The Sounds of Exotic Island (Somerset, 1960)
- Hawaii (Somerset, 1960)

=== As sideman ===
With Louis Bellson

- Ecue (Ritmos Cubanos) (Pablo, 1978)
- Prime Time (Concord Jazz, 1978)
- Louie Bellson Jam (Pablo, 1979)

With Alessi Brothers

- Alessi (A&M, 1976)

With Frank Capp

- Percussion in a Tribute to Henry Mancini (Kimberly, 1961)
- Percussion in a Tribute to Glenn Miller (Kimberly, 1963)
- Percussion in a Tribute to Lawrence Welk (Kimberly, 1963)
- In a Tribute to the Dorsey Brothers (Kimberly, 2010)
- In a Tribute to Count Basie (Kimberly, 2014)

With Rosemary Clooney

- That Travelin' Two-Beat (Capitol, 1965)

With Nat King Cole

- Nat King Cole Sings/George Shearing Plays (Capitol, 1962)
- Let's Face the Music! (Capitol, 1964)

With George Duke

- I Love the Blues, She Heard My Cry (MPS, 1975)
- Liberated Fantasies (MPS, 1976)
- From Me to You (Epic, 1977)

With Michael Giacchino

- The Incredibles (Walt Disney, 2004)
- Ratatouille (Walt Disney, 2007)
- Coco (Walt Disney, 2017)
- Spider-Man: Homecoming (Sony, 2017)
- War for the Planet of the Apes (Sony, 2017)

With George Harrison

- Dark Horse (Apple, 1974)
- Thirty Three & 1/3 (Dark Horse, 1976)
- George Harrison (Dark Horse, 1979)

With Paul Horn

- Something Blue (HiFi Jazz, 1960)
- The Sound of Paul Horn (Columbia, 1961)
- Profile of a Jazz Musician (Columbia, 1962)
- Impressions of Cleopatra (Columbia, 1963)
- Jazz Suite on the Mass Texts (RCA, Victor, 1965)

With James Newton Howard

- Off Limits (Varese Sarabande, 1988)
- Grand Canyon (RCA, 1991)
- Outbreak (Varese Sarabande, 1995)
- Waterworld (MCA, 1995)

With Quincy Jones

- The Hot Rock OST (Prophesy, 1972)
- Roots (A&M, 1977)
- The Color Purple (Qwest, 1986)
- Basie & Beyond (Qwest, 2000)

With Roger Kellaway

- The Roger Kellaway Cello Quartet (A&M, 1971)
- Come to the Meadow (A&M, 1974)
- Nostalgia Suite (Discwasher, 1978)

With Stan Kenton

- Artistry in Jazz (Capitol, 1972)
- Stan Kenton Conducts the Los Angeles Neophonic Orchestra (Capitol, 1965)
- Hair (Capitol, 1969)
- Kenton's Christmas (Capitol, 1970)
- New Horizons Volume 1 (Tantara, 2014)
- New Horizons Volume 2 (Tantara, 2014)

With Julie London

- Julie...At Home (Liberty, 1960)
- All Through the Night: Julie London Sings the Choicest of Cole Porter (Capitol, 1965)

With Henry Mancini

- The Hawaiians (United Artists, 1970)
- Symphonic Soul (RCA Victor, 1975)
- The Jazz Sound from Peter Gunn (Fresh Sound, 1994)

With Harry Partch

- The World of Harry Partch (Columbia, 1969)
- Delusion of the Fury (Sony, 1999)
- Harry Partch: A Portrait (New World, 2015)

With Shorty Rogers

- Bossa Nova (Reprise, 1961)
- Jazz Waltz (Reprise, 1962)
- The Fourth Dimension in Sound (Warner Bros., 1962)
- An Invisible Orchard (RCA, 1997)

With Lalo Schifrin

- More Mission: Impossible (Paramamount, 1969), featured in a chimes solo on "Self-Destruct"
- Rock Requiem (Verve, 1971)
- Gypsies (Tabu, 1978)
- Rush Hour 2 (Varese Sarabande, 2001)
- Rush Hour 3 (Varese Sarabande, 2007)

With Shadowfax

- Shadowfax (Windham Hill, 1982)
- Shadowdance (Windham Hill, 1983)
- Too Far to Whisper (Windham Hill, 1986)
- Folksongs for a Nuclear Village (Capitol, 1988)
- Esperanto (EarthBeat!, 1992)

With George Shearing

- In the Night (Capitol, 1958)
- Latin Lace (Capitol, 1958)
- Shearing On Stage! (Capitol, 1959)
- On the Sunny Side of the Strip (Capitol, 1960)
- The Shearing Touch! (World Record Club, 1964)
- Satin Affair (World Record Club, 1967)

With Frank Sinatra

- Ring-a-Ding-Ding! (Reprise, 1961)
- Sinatra's Swingin' Session!!! (Capitol, 1961)
- Sinatra Swings (Reprise, 1961)
- Come Swing with Me! (Capitol, 1961)
- Sinatra and Strings (Reprise, 1962)
- Point of No Return (Capitol, 1962)
- Sinatra and Swingin' Brass (Reprise, 1962)
- The Concert Sinatra (Reprise, 1963)
- It Might as Well Be Swing (Reprise, 1964)
- Sinatra Sings Days of Wine and Roses, Moon River, and Other Academy Award Winners (Reprise, 1964)
- Softly, as I Leave You (Reprise, 1964)
- 12 Songs of Christmas (Reprise, 1964)
- My Kind of Broadway (Reprise, 1965)
- That's Life (Reprise, 1966)
- Strangers in the Night (Reprise, 1966)
- Cycles (Reprise, 1968)
- My Way (Reprise, 1968)
- A Man Alone (Reprise, 1969)
- Sinatra & Company (Reprise, 1971)
- Ol' Blue Eyes Is Back (Reprise, 1973)
- Some Nice Things I've Missed (Reprise, 1974)
- She Shot Me Down (Reprise, 1981)
- Duets (Capitol, 1993)

With The Manhattan Transfer

- The Spirit of St. Louis (Atlantic, 2000)

With L. Subramaniam

- Fantasy Without Limits (Trend, 1980)
- Blossom (Crusaders, 1981)
- Indian Express (Milestone, 1983)
- Spanish Wave (Milestone, 1983)
- Salaam Bombay! (DRG, 1988)

With Frank Zappa

- Lumpy Gravy (Verve, 1967)
- Orchestral Favorites (Discreet, 1979)
- Läther (Rykodisc, 1996)

With Hans Zimmer

- Broken Arrow (Milan, 1996)
- The Thin Red Line (RCA Victor, 1999)
- The Last Samurai (Elektra, 2003)

With others

- Francisco Aguabella, Dance the Latin Way (Fantasy, 1962)
- Toshiko Akiyoshi & Lew Tabackin Big Band, March of the Tadpoles (RCA, 1977)
- Laurindo Almeida, Virtuoso Guitar (Crystal Clear, 1977)
- Herb Alpert, Just You and Me (A&M, 1976)
- Herb Alpert, Rise (A&M, 1979)
- Paul Anka, Rock Swings (Verve, 2005)
- Attitudes, Good News (Dark Horse, 1977)
- Klaus Badelt, Pirates of the Caribbean: The Curse of the Black Pearl (Walt Disney, 2003)
- Klaus Badelt, Pirates of the Caribbean (Walt Disney, 2007)
- The Beach Boys, The Beach Boys with the Royal Philharmonic Orchestra (Capitol, 2018)
- Bee Gees, Saturday Night Fever (RSO, 1977)
- Hal Blaine, Psychedelic Percussion (Dunhill, 1967)
- Blondie, Autoamerican (Chrysalis, 1980)
- Pat Boone, Great! Great! Great! (Dot, 1961)
- Terence Boylan, Suzy (Asylum, 1980)
- Brass Fever, Brass Fever (Impulse!, 1975)
- Les Brown, The Explosive Sound of Les Brown and His Band of Renown Swingin' the Masters! (Columbia, 1963)
- Michael Bublé, Call Me Irresponsible (Reprise Records, 2007)
- Bobby Caldwell, Solid Ground (Polydor, 1991)
- Vanessa Carlton, Be Not Nobody (A&M, 2002)
- Leonard Cohen, Death of a Ladies' Man (Columbia, 1977)
- Sam Cooke, Ain't That Good News (RCA Victor, 1964)
- Les Crane, Desiderata (Warner Bros., 1971)
- Marshall Crenshaw, Jaggedland (429 Records, 2009)
- Dick Dale, Summer Surf (Capitol, 1964)
- Bobby Darin, Venice Blue (Capitol, 1965)
- Bobby Darin, Bobby Darin Sings The Shadow of Your Smile (Atlantic, 1966)
- Sammy Davis Jr. & Count Basie, Our Shining Hour (Jazz Heritage, 1979)
- Dion DiMucci, Born to Be with You (Collectables, 1975)
- Dolenz, Jones, Boyce & Hart, Dolenz, Jones, Boyce & Hart (Capitol, 1976)
- João Donato, A Bad Donato (Blue Thumb, 1970)
- Donovan, Slow Down World (Epic, 1976)
- The Doors, Other Voices (Elektra, 1971)
- Duane Eddy, Duane Eddy (Capitol, 1987)
- Danny Elfman, MIB2 (Sony, 2012)
- Danny Elfman, Epic (Sony, 2013)
- David Essex, Be-Bop the Future (Mercury, 1981)
- Mimi Fariña & Tom Jans, Take Heart (A&M, 1971)
- Victor Feldman, The Venezuela Joropo (Pacific Jazz, 1967)
- Jerry Fielding, Near East Brass (Command, 1967)
- Ella Fitzgerald, Ella Fitzgerald Sings the Harold Arlen Songbook (Verve, 1961)
- Sam Fletcher, Sam Fletcher Sings "I Believe In You" (Vee-Jay, 1964)
- Dominic Frontiere, On Any Sunday (Bell, 1971)
- Ted Gärdestad, Blue Virgin Isles (Polar, 1978)
- Marvin Gaye, Let's Get It On (Tamla, 1973)
- Lowell George, Lightning-Rod Man (Bizarre, 1993)
- Bob Gibson, Bob Gibson (Capitol, 1971)
- Dizzy Gillespie, The New Continent (Limelight, 1965)
- Jackie Gleason, The Now Sound... for Today's Lovers (Capitol, 1968)
- Jerry Goldsmith, Along Came a Spider (Varese Sarabande, 2001)
- Glen Gray, Sounds of the Great Bands! (Capitol, 1958)
- Kathe Green, Kathe Green (Prodigal, 1976)
- Josh Groban, Illuminations (Reprise, 2010)
- Dave Grusin, Cinemagic (GRP, 1987)
- Lani Hall, Hello It's Me (A&M, 1974)
- Cyril Havermans, Cyril (MGM, 1973)
- Lee Hazlewood, Something Special (Light in the Attic, 1968)
- Neal Hefti, Jazz Pops (Reprise, 1962)
- Jermaine Jackson, Let's Get Serious (Motown, 1980)
- Maurice Jarre, Gorillas in the Mist (MCA, 1988)
- Pete Jolly, Seasons (A&M, 1970)
- Michael Kamen, The Three Musketeers (Hollywood, 1993)
- Michael Kamen, 101 Dalmatians (Walt Disney, 1996)
- Barney Kessel, Contemporary Latin Rhythms (Reprise, 1963)
- Jean King, Sings for the In-Crowd (Hanna-Barbera, 1966)
- John Klemmer, Touch (ABC, 1975)
- Irene Kral, Wonderful Life (Mainstream, 1965)
- Irene Kral, Kral Space (Catalyst, 1977)
- Diana Krall, Christmas Songs (Verve, 2005)
- Queen Latifah, The Dana Owens Album (A&M, 2004)
- Peggy Lee, Blues Cross Country (Capitol, 1962)
- Peggy Lee, Sugar 'n' Spice (Capitol, 1962)
- Peggy Lee, Make It with You (Capitol, 1970)
- Carly Simon, Playing Possum (Elektra, 1975)
- Nils Lofgren, Cry Tough (A&M, 1976)
- Harvey Mandel, Baby Batter (Janus, 1971)
- Barry Manilow, This Is My Town: Songs of New York (Decca, 2017)
- Shelly Manne, Daktari (Atlantic, 1967)
- Hugh Masekela, Hugh Masekela's Latest (Uni, 1967)
- Dave Mason, Split Coconut (CBS, 1975)
- Lonette McKee, Lonette (Sussex, 1974)
- Carmen McRae, I Am Music (Blue Note, 1975)
- Mike Melvoin, Keys to Your Mind (Liberty, 1966)
- Sérgio Mendes, Brasil '88 (Elektra, 1978)
- Bette Midler, Bathhouse Betty (Warner Bros., 1998)
- Liza Minnelli, Gently (Angel, 1996)
- Joni Mitchell, Mingus (Asylum, 1979)
- The Monkees, The Monkees Present (Colgems, 1969)
- The Monkees, Instant Replay (Colgems, 1969)
- Hugo Montenegro, Process 70 (Time, 1962)
- Chris Morris, Christopher Morris Band (MCA, 1977)
- Alphonse Mouzon, The Man Incognito (Blue Note, 1976)
- Maria Muldaur, Waitress in a Donut Shop (Reprise, 1974)
- Gerry Mulligan, The Age of Steam (A&M, 1972)
- Sammy Nestico, This Is the Moment (Fenwood Music, 2002)
- Juice Newton, Quiet Lies (Capitol, 1982)
- Harry Nilsson, Sandman (RCA Victor, 1976)
- Jeffrey Osborne, Stay with Me Tonight (A&M, 1983)
- Jimmy and Carol Owens, The Witness (Light, 1978)
- Freda Payne, Payne & Pleasure (ABC, 1974)
- Van Dyke Parks, Jump! (Warner Bros., 1984)
- Stu Phillips, A Touch of Modern (MGM, 1956)
- Steve Porcaro, Metro (Walt Disney, 1997)
- Gregory Porter, Nat King Cole & Me (Blue Note, 2017)
- John Powell, Mr. & Mrs. Smith (Recall, 2005)
- Don Preston, Vile Foamy Ectoplasm (Muffin, 1993)
- Joshua Radin, Underwater (Mom + Pop, 2012)
- Helen Reddy, Ear Candy (Capitol, 1977)
- Emitt Rhodes, The American Dream (A&M, 1970)
- Howard Roberts, Jaunty-Jolly! (Capitol, 1967)
- Robbie Robertson & Alex North, Carny (Warner Bros., 1980)
- Tommy Roe, We Can Make Music (ABC, 1970)
- Linda Ronstadt, Winter Light (Elektra, 1993)
- Willie Ruff, The Smooth Side of Ruff (Columbia, 1968)
- Buffy Sainte-Marie, Sweet America (ABC, 1976)
- Mongo Santamaría, Afro Roots (Prestige, 1989)
- Diane Schuur, Music Is My Life (Atlantic, 1999)
- Clifford Scott, Lavender Sax (World Pacific, 1964)
- Tom Scott, The Honeysuckle Breeze (Impulse!, 1967)
- Tom Scott, Great Scott! (A&M, 1972)
- Ravi Shankar, Charly (World Pacific, 1968)
- Ravi Shankar, Shankar Family & Friends (Dark Horse, 1974)
- Judee Sill, Heart Food (Asylum, 1973)
- Nancy Sinatra, Boots (Reprise, 1966)
- The Singers Unlimited, Just in Time (Pausa, 1978)
- Joanie Sommers, The Voice of the Sixties! (Warner Bros., 1961)
- Joanie Sommers, Softly, the Brazilian Sound (Warner Bros., 1964)
- Phil Spector, Back to Mono 1958–1969 (Abkco, 1991)
- The Surfers, Tahiti (HiFi, 1960)
- Gábor Szabó, Wind, Sky and Diamonds (Impulse!, 1967)
- Bob Thiele, Gábor Szabó & Tom Scott, Light My Fire (Impulse!, 1967)
- Mel Tormé, Comin' Home Baby! (Atlantic, 1962)
- Vinx, Rooms in My Fatha's House (I.R.S., 1991)
- Wendy Waldman, Wendy Waldman (Warner Bros., 1975)
- Mary Wilson, Mary Wilson (Motown, 1979)
- Nancy Wilson, Guess Who I Saw Today (Capitol, 2005)
- Richard "Popcorn" Wylie, Extrasensory Perception (ABC, 1974)
- Daniel Valdez, Mestizo (A&M, 1974)
- David Werner, Imagination Quota (RCA Victor, 1975)
- Gary Wright, Headin' Home (Warner Bros., 1979)

== Bibliography ==
- Richards, Emil (1972). World of percussion; a catalog of 300 standard, ethnic, and special musical instruments and effects. Gwyn Pub. Co.
- Richards, Emil (2009). Mallet Chord Studies – Chord Voicings and Arpeggio Patterns for Vibraphone and Marimba. Hal Leonard Corporation. ISBN 978-1423469919.
- Richards, Emil (2009). Sight Reading for Mallets. Hal Leonard Corporation. ISBN 978-1423469902.
- Richards, Emil (2009). Melody & Rhythm Permutations. Hal Leonard Corporation. ISBN 978-1423469926.
- Richards, Emil (2009). Exercises for Mallet Instruments. Hal Leonard Corporation. ISBN 978-1423469896.
- Richards, Emil (2013). Wonderful World of Percussion: My Life Behind Bars. BearManor Media. ISBN 978-1593932657.
