= Roupen Altiparmakian =

Roupen Altiparmakian Ռուբէն Ալթըփարմաքեան Ρουπέν Ἀλτιπαρμακιάν
- Genres: Greek Rembetika, Armenian folk songs
- Occupation: musician
- Instruments: violin, oud
- Years active: late 1930s to 1990s

Roupen Altiparmakian (Armenian: Ռուբէն Ալթըփարմաքեան Rubēn Altëparmakean, in Greek: Ρουπέν Ἀλτιπαρμακιάν Roupén Altiparmakián; b. in Adana, Ottoman Empire on May 28, 1919 - d. in New York City, US, on March 13, 1999) was an Armenian master of the violin and oud.

== Career ==
When he was a child, Altiparmakian's family moved to Athens, Greece. He got his first violin from his father when he was eight years old. His studies of music at the Conservatory of Athens were interrupted by World War II. He escaped to the mountain villages of Greece, and earned his living by the playing violin. His fame grew, and he got an opportunity to collaborate with other Greek musicians, and even appeared in a number of films with his violin.

In 1962, he moved to New York City, where his career really took off. He performed with many of the Armenian, Greek and Turkish singers of the day, and recorded his first album, "Armenian Love Songs", in 1965. Famed French-born Armenian-American singer Onnik Dinkjian appeared as the lead vocalist on the album, with Roupen playing oud and providing occasional backup vocals, playing violin on a few numbers, as well as writing and/or arranging all the pieces. Altiparmakian has a unique musical style and rhythm that has earned him a respected reputation.

His song "Hey Valla" originally released on the album "Armenian Love Songs" became a standard in the repertoire of Armenian-American kef bands (dance bands which play for weddings and other ethnic functions). It was covered on recordings by Richie Berberian with Mal Barsamian, John Bilezikjian, Robert Takoushian, Robert Chilingirian, Ara Topouzian, and Mike Gostanian among others. His song "Lucy" was covered by Adiss Harmandian without however, giving Roupen songwriting credit.

The albums "Armenian Kef Songs" and "Oud Taxims" were released after his death by his family. They were compiled from unreleased, studio, but mostly homemade recordings, that Roupen recorded at home.

== Albums ==
- Armenian Love Songs
- Oud Taxims – The Lost Treasures
- Roupen's Armenian Kef Songs
