= John Bilezikjian =

Armenian-American musician (1948–2015)

- Born: John Bilezikjian; February 1, 1948; Los Angeles, California, United States
- Died: January 19, 2015 (aged 66) Mission Viejo, California, United States
- Genre: Folk
- Occupations: Musician, composer, entertainer
- Instruments: Oud, mandolin, violin/viola, ukulele, keyboard, balalaika, clarinet, bass guitar, recorder, percussion, vocals
- Label: Dantz Records

John Bilezikjian (February 1, 1948 in Los Angeles – January 19, 2015) was an Armenian-American musician and composer. Most renowned as an oud master, he also played the violin, mandolin and dumbek. He was also a traditional and contemporary singer singing in Armenian, but also in Turkish, Neo-Aramaic, and English. He was known for his contributions to world music as a solo act and in collaborations with renowned artists. He established his own record company, Dantz Records in Laguna Hills, California making many recordings, and appearing in tens of film soundtracks.

Collaborations included Leonard Cohen in Recent Songs (1979) after touring with him on his live concerts, resulting in Cohen Live album in 1994 and The Smokey Life Tour recorded in 1979. He played oud in Cohen's 1988 album I'm Your Man. In 1992, he collaborated with British singer Robert Palmer in the latter's album Ridin' High, where he played oud and dumbek in "Want You More". In 1997, he recorded with Mexican singer Luis Miguel in the latter's album playing mandolin in Romances and in 1994 with Plácido Domingo in De Mi Alma Latina and in 1999 in Por Amor.

In 2002, he joined the world music band Brothers of the Baladi recording in their album Hope. He also played with the Armenian-American musician Armen Chakmakian and singers Roupen Altiparmakian and Andy Madadian

He played with many orchestras including The Los Angeles Philharmonic Orchestra, The Los Angeles Mandolin Orchestra, The Pacific Palisades Symphony. In 2005 he played with the Boston Pops Orchestra as featured soloist, marking the first time the oud was heard in a solo capacity with that orchestra on its stage. He later appeared as a bouzouki soloist with The Pasadena Pops Orchestra. He has played in recordings by Alberto Mizrahi, Brothers of the Baladi, Steve Young, David Such, Radim Zenkl.

He died on January 19, 2015, from kidney disease aged 66.

== Discography ==
(Selective)

- 1995: Music from the Armenian Diaspora
- 1999: Tapestry of the Dance
- 2007: Atlantis
- 2008: All-Time Armenian Favorites
- 2009: Sounds of the Middle East
- 2012: Pomegranate

Live

- America's Oud Virtuoso Recorded in Concert Live at the Wilshire Ebell Theatre in Los Angeles

Collaborations

- 1992: Sephardic Songs of Love and Hope Canticas Sephardis de Amor y Esperansa (Gordon Lustig, John Bilezikjian & Judy Frankel)
- 2002: The Music of "La Danse Orientale" – John Bilezikjian and Aziz Khadra

== Books ==
- 2006: John Bilezikjian, Hal Leonard Oud Method (plus accompanying CD) (by Hal Leonard Corporation)
