= Folksongs for a Nuclear Village =

Studio album by Shadowfax
- Released: March 30, 1988
- Recorded: Powertrax, Hollywood, California
- Genre: New-age, jazz
- Length: 45:23
- Label: Capitol
- Producer: David Kershenbaum and Harry Andronis

Shadowfax chronology
Too Far to Whisper (1986)	Folksongs for a Nuclear Village (1988)	The Odd Get Even (1990)

Professional ratings
Review scores
Source	Rating
Allmusic	link

Folksongs for a Nuclear Village is the sixth studio album by new-age/jazz group Shadowfax, their first for Capitol Records. It won the Grammy Award for Best New Age Album in 1989.

"Folksong for a Nuclear Village" was a 1982 dance performance choreographed by Louise Durkee of Seattle in that city.

The cover artwork is a piece by Michael McMillen called Nel Mezzo Del Cammin Di Nostra Vita, which is the opening line from The Divine Comedy, meaning, in English, "In the middle of our life's journey."

== Track listing ==
1. "The Firewalker" (Chuck Greenberg) – 4:54
2. "We Used to Laugh" (Greenberg) – 4:07
3. "Solar Wind" (David C. Lewis) – 5:08
4. "Behind Green Eyes" (Phil Maggini) – 5:17
5. "Lucky Mud" (Stuart Nevitt) – 4:40
6. "Madagascar Cafe" (Nevitt, G. E. Stinson) – 3:06
7. "Against the Grain" (Charles Bisharat) – 3:42
8. "No Society" (Bisharat) – 4:16
9. "Elephant Ego" (Lewis) – 5:00
10. "Folksong for a Nuclear Village" (Maggini, Stinson) – 5:13

== Personnel ==
- Chuck Greenberg – Lyricon, tenor saxophone, soprano saxophone, alto, wood and clay flutes, double ocarina
- Stuart Nevitt – cymbals, drums, E-mu SP-12/Pad 8 programming, gongs, timbales, caxixi, shakers, boobams, bamboo zither, shaman rattles, Bushman dance rattles, sampled dundago, clappers, kiwi drums, Moroccan clay drums, tambourines, bendir, gankogui, talking drum, log drums, congas
- G. E. Stinson – electric and acoustic guitars, mbiras, accordion
- Charles Bisharat – electric violin, violin, Yamaha DX7 synthesizer
- David C. Lewis – Yamaha DX-7, Yamaha TX-7, Memorymoog synthesizer, E-mu Emax, sampled grand piano, Yamaha QX-I sequencer, Oberheim DX stretch drum machine
- Phil Maggini – bass, fretless bass, string bass, Roland D-50 synthesizer, baby grand piano, bowed waterfone

=== Additional personnel ===
- John Bergamo – tabla (3)
- Emil Richards – marimba (1, 8), flapamba (1, 7), bass marimba (3, 6), jay call (3), E-11 sampled wind chimes (5), marimba (5), boobams (5), gamelan gongs (5), metal angklung (5), dumbeg (6), clappers (6), shekere (6), bamboo stamping tubes (7), angklung (7), primitive toms (7, 8), woodblock marimba (8), E-11 sampled didjeridu (10), bull roar (10), daka di bello (11), whistle (11)
- Haralambi A. - sampled talking drum (9)
- Michael Spiro – percussion (2, 7, 9), conga (2, 7, 9)

== Charts ==
Chart (1988)	Peak position
US Billboard 200	168
Billboard Top Contemporary Jazz Albums	10
Billboard Top New Age Albums	9
