= Jamii Szmadzinski =

American electric violinist

Jamii Szmadzinski is an American electric violinist who was a member of the band Shadowfax and Human Drama.

Szmadzinski was born in Michigan, United States, and at the age of 14 earned a scholarship to Interlochen Arts Academy, He went on to Boston Conservatory for composition and performance studies. He also attended Berklee College of Music in Boston and Film scoring studies at UCLA.

Szmadzinski has produced, composed, arranged and performed for several feature films Kickboxer, Street Justice, Bloodsport, Country, Tender Mercies, The Stray; was concert master for Solo (new AFI film); and a number of television movie credits which include The Mae West Story, Beauty & The Beast, Coweta County and others as a featured soloist. He was Associate Music Producer of the award-winning series Portrait of America. Music Producer for Digital Domain in Asia and Record Producer for the legendary Chinese Rock Band "Black Panther.Apple's initial ad campaign was co-composed and performed by Szmadzinski. Other commercial projects include American Express, 3M products, Pizza Hut, AT&T and Holiday Health Spas with Cher.
