= Tbilat =

Moroccan percussion instrument

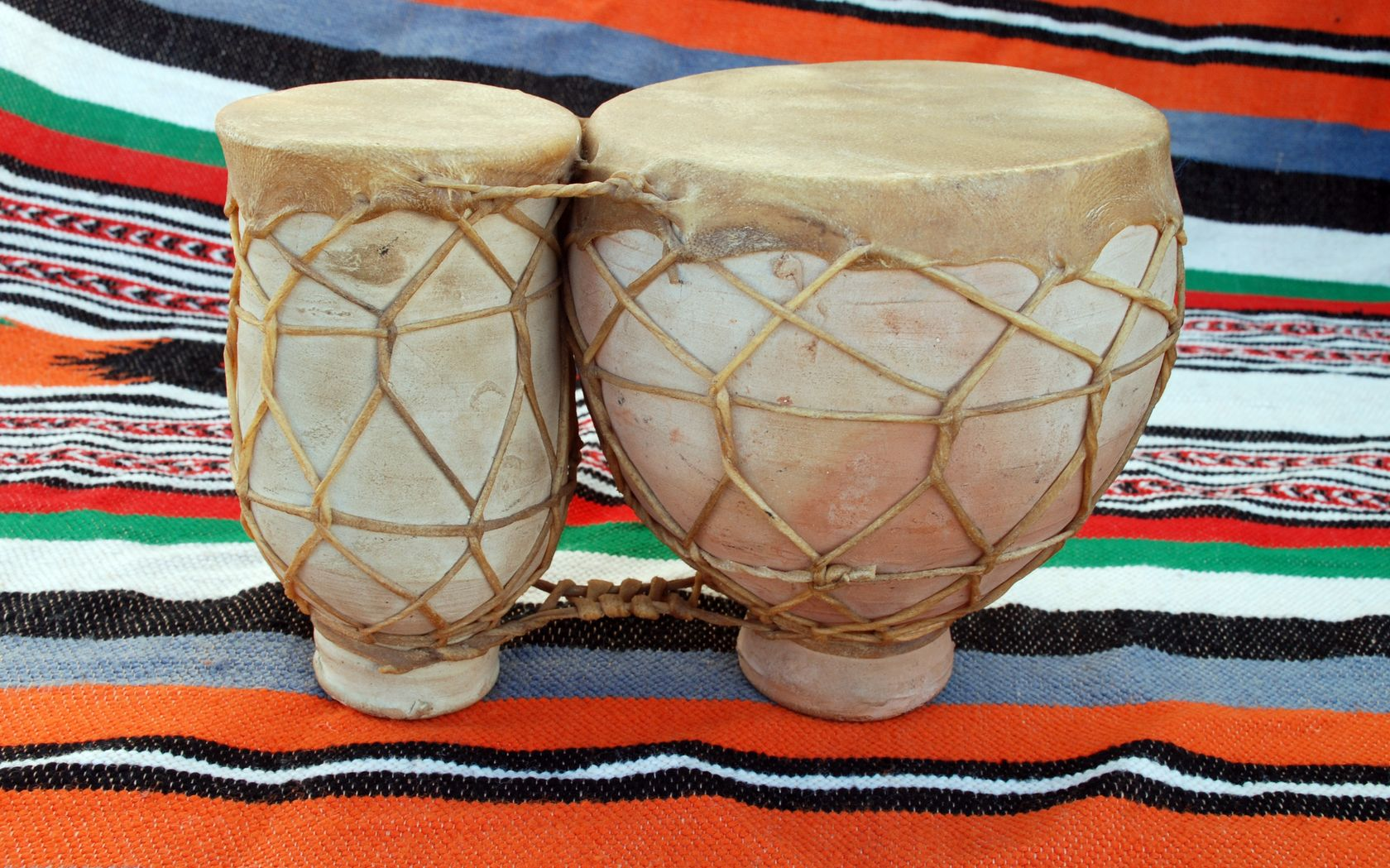
Tbilat

The tbilat is a percussion instrument from Morocco which resembles bongos and tabla. It consists of a pair of decorated pottery drums of different sizes. The skinheads are stretched by plaited gut cords. This membranophone is placed on the ground between the legs and is played with both hands.
