= DrumKAT =

Series of MIDI percussion controllers

The DrumKAT is in a class of MIDI percussion controllers which also includes the DrumKAT Turbo, DrumKAT EZ (discontinued), DrumKAT DK10, TrapKAT and MalletKAT. DrumKAT was first produced by KAT, Inc (Chicopee, MA). The current manufacturer is Alternate Mode, Inc (also of Chicopee, MA).

== Description ==
The control surface has 10 velocity-sensitive gum-rubber pads with force-sensing resistors (FSR) which detect and convert mechanical energy into electrical signals.
