= David C. Lewis (musician) =

American musician (1940–2021)

- Born: 1953; Seattle, Washington, US
- Died: January 3, 2021 (aged 67–68) Agua Dulce, California, US
- Genres: Pop; pop rock; soft rock; rock
- Instrument: Keyboards
- Years active: 1978–2021
- Formerly of: Ambrosia; Shadowfax; Missing Persons

David C. Lewis (January 3 1953 – June 7, 2021) born in Seattle, Washington, was an American multi-instrumentalist best known as the keyboardist and composer with the American soft-rock band Ambrosia and the group Shadowfax.

== Career ==
David Cutler Lewis was born in Seattle, Washington. He began classical piano lessons at age 5, and while in primary and junior high school, he also played the trumpet and French horn.

Lewis relocated to California when he was 19 and enrolled at the California Institute of the Arts, continuing his studies in modern, classical, and jazz piano. His studies also included the sitar, African dance, and multimedia that combined modern dance and theatre. He also studied on the Buchla, one of the first synthesizers.

After graduating from CalArts, Lewis played in a number of Californian bands before joining the soft-rock group Ambrosia from 1978 until 1983, and from 1984 he performed with the band Shadowfax until 1990. He won a Grammy with Shadowfax for "Best New Age Performance" for Folksongs for a Nuclear Village in 1988. He rejoined Ambrosia for another four years when the band reunited in 2005.

Lewis played and recorded with several artists such as Edgar Winter, Billy Preston, Al Stewart, Stephan Bishop, Gary Wright, Terry Sylvester of The Hollies, John Ford Coley, The Doobie Brothers, Heart, and Michael Hedges. Throughout his career, he has opened and shared billing with well-known industry giants like Chick Corea, Miles Davis, Stevie Ray Vaughan, Boston, Foreigner, Kansas, Styx, Rush, Hall & Oats, and several others.

Lewis resided in Agua Dulce, California, until his death from brain cancer in 2021. Upon his death, co-founder and primary songwriter for Ambrosia, David Pack, referred to Lewis as "Ambrosia's musical Swiss Army Knife. He could do it all."
