= Shadowfax (band) =

American new-age/electronic music group (1972–1995)

- Photo by Sam Emerson

Background information
- Origin: Chicago, Illinois, U.S.
- Genres: Chamber jazz; new-age; electronic; blues; progressive rock
- Years active: 1972–1995
- Labels: Passport/ABC; Windham Hill; Capitol; Private Music; Earthbeat! Sonic Images
- Past members: See "Members"

Shadowfax was a new-age/electronic musical group formed in Chicago in the early 1970s and best known for their albums Shadowfax and Folksongs for a Nuclear Village. In 1989, they won the Grammy for Best New Age Performance for Folksongs for a Nuclear Village. In 1993, they were nominated for the Grammy for Esperanto.

The group formed in 1972 and disbanded after 1995 when lyricon player and leader Chuck Greenberg died of a heart attack. Having lost their signature sound, Shadowfax's members went on to other projects.

The group took its name from Gandalf the Grey's horse Shadowfax in J. R. R. Tolkien's The Lord of the Rings.

== Members ==
- Chuck Greenberg – lyricon, saxophone, flute (1974-1995)
- Armen Chakmakian – keyboards (1990-1995)
- David Lewis – keyboards (1984-1990)
- G. E. Stinson – guitars (1974-1990)
- Charlie Bisharat – electric violin (1986-1990)
- Phil Maggini – double bass, bass guitar, vocals (1974-1995)
- Stuart Nevitt – drums, percussion (1974-1995)
- Doug Maluchnik - acoustic grand, Baldwin & Rhodes, ARP 2600, Minimoog, Oberheim, digital sequencer, harpsichord, chamberlin

=== Additional musicians ===
- Emil Richards – percussion (1982-1992)
- Ramon Yslas – percussion
- Andy Abad – guitars
- Doug Maluchnik – keyboards
- Jared Stewart – keyboards (1983)
- Jamii Szmadzinski - electric violin (1983-1986)
- Jerry Goodman – violin

== Discography ==
- 1976 – Watercourse Way (re-mixed and partially re-recorded 1985)
- 1982 – Shadowfax
- 1983 – Shadowdance
- 1984 – The Dreams of Children
- 1986 – Too Far to Whisper
- 1988 – Folksongs for a Nuclear Village
- 1990 – The Odd Get Even
- 1991 – What Goes Around - The Best Of Shadowfax
- 1992 – Esperanto
- 1994 – Magic Theater
- 1995 – Live
- 2019 – Live at the Wise Fools Pub 1978
- 2019 – The Lost Years

== Notes ==
- Greenberg, Joy (2006) A Pause in the Rain ISBN 1-60145-018-4
- Larkin, Colin (1995) The Guinness Encyclopedia of Popular Music ISBN 1-56159-176-9
- Yurochko, Bob (1993) A Short History of Jazz ISBN 0-8304-1595-5
