= Lyricon =

Electronic wind instrument

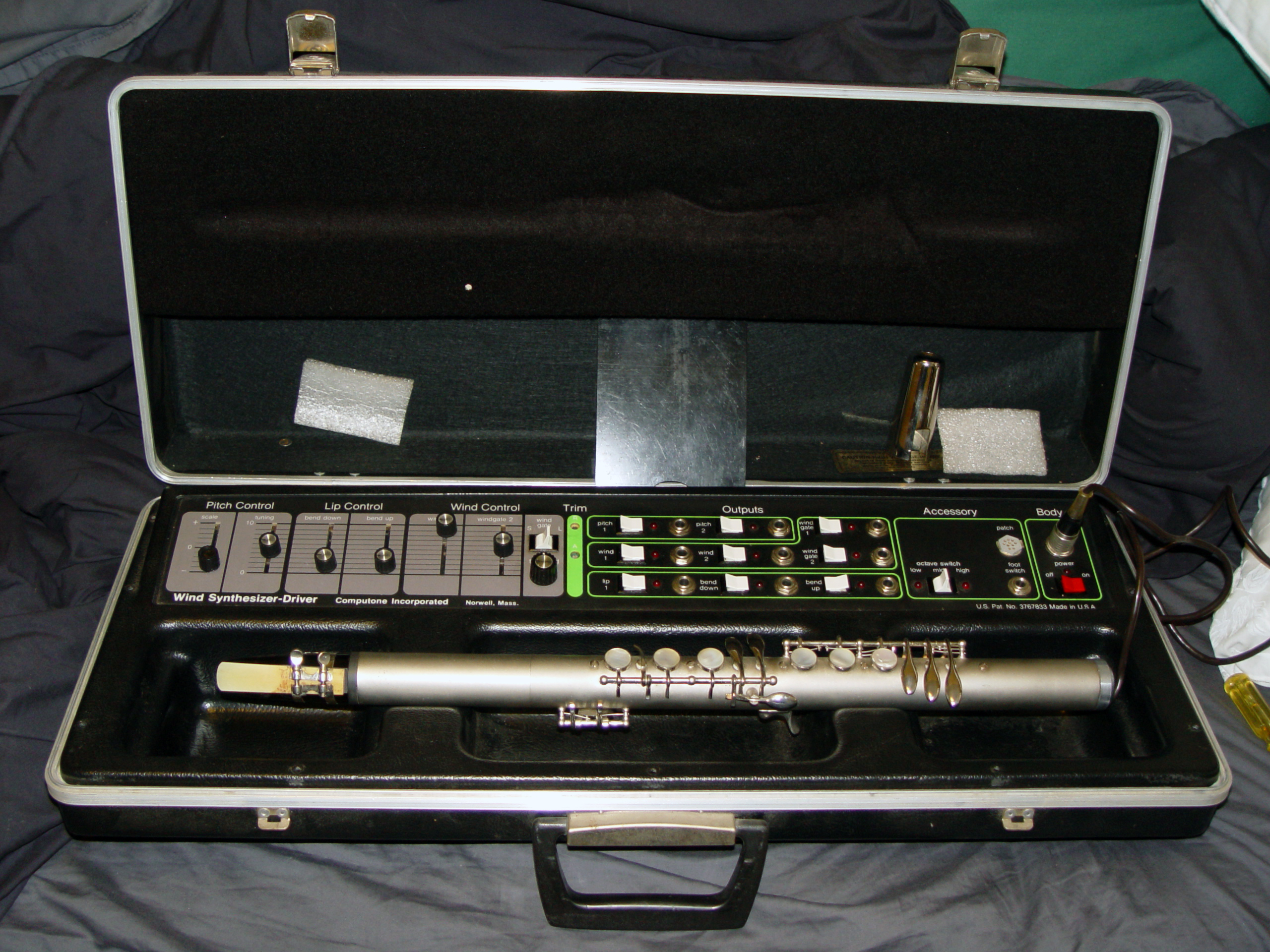
Computone Wind Synthesizer Controller (essentially a Lyricon II without synthesizer)

The Lyricon is an electronic wind instrument invented by Bill Bernardi and produced by Computone Inc. in small numbers from 1974 until roughly 1980. It was the first wind controller, and predated MIDI and widespread use of digital synthesizers. Three models were developed: the Lyricon I, Wind Synthesizer Driver, and Lyricon II.

== History ==
The Lyricon was invented by Bill Bernardi (and co-engineered by Roger Noble and with the late Lyricon performer Chuck Greenberg of Shadowfax), filed for patent on October 5, 1971, by Computone Inc., patented under #US3767833 October 23, 1973, and manufactured by Computone Inc. in Massachusetts in the early 1970s. The first Lyricon was completed in 1974, with Tom Scott being the first customer for the instrument.

The Lyricon was available in two designs, the first being somewhat silver and resembling a soprano saxophone and the latter, black and resembling an alto clarinet. Using a form of additive synthesis, the player was allowed to change between types of overtones with a key switchable between fundamentals of G, Bb, C, Eb, and F (allowing the instrument to be used to play transposed parts written for saxophones, trumpets, etc.) and an octave range that could be switched between low, medium, or high. The instrument also had controls for glissando, portamento, and "timbre attack" (a type of chorusing). The Lyricon used a bass clarinet mouthpiece, with a sprung metal sensor on the (non-vibrating) reed that detected lip pressure. Wind pressure was detected by a diaphragm, which moved and changed the light output from an LED, which was in turn sensed by a photocell to give dynamic control. The Lyricon I was originally priced at $3,295 which was quite expensive for the time, also probably one of the reasons why the instrument was sold only in small numbers.

Two additional remodeled Lyricons were engineered over time. The first was the "Wind Synthesizer Driver", which had control voltage outputs for lip pressure, wind pressure and pitch, to control the VCA and VCF and pitch of an external analog synthesizer. The second was the "Lyricon II", which included a two-oscillator synthesizer. All Lyricons used the same saxophone-style fingering system, with two octave keys above the left-hand thumb rest. The Wind Synthesizer Driver and the Lyricon II also had a transposition footswitch feature, where a foot pedal could be used to transpose the entire range up or down one octave. None of the Lyricons were engineered to use MIDI (which was introduced in 1982, while Yamaha started to develop their WX7 MIDI wind instrument), although external MIDIfication modules were produced by JLCooper and STEIM. The design of the Lyricon controller was later borrowed to form the basis for Yamaha's WX-series MIDI wind controllers.

Approximately 200 units of the Lyricon I were handmade and approximately 2000 units of the driver and Lyricon II were manufactured. However, since Computone went out of business in 1980 and Bernardi died in 2014, the number of functioning instruments has greatly reduced as few people have the know-how to repair them and spare parts are hard to obtain.

Prominent examples of a Lyricon's sound can be heard in Tom Scott's intros to Steely Dan’s 1977 song "Peg" and Michael Jackson's song "Billie Jean". Additionally, Gerry Rafferty's song "Night Owl" features Raphael Ravenscroft using the instrument. Takeshi Itoh, the saxophonist of T-Square, also makes frequent use of the Lyricon, which was used frequently in T-Square's compositions in the 1970s and 1980s.

== Prominent Lyriconists ==
- Ian Anderson
- Jay Beckenstein
- Richard Elliot
- Kenny G
- Chuck Greenberg
- Steve Jolliffe
- Roland Kirk
- Michał Urbaniak
- Yusef Lateef
- Andy Mackay
- Bennie Maupin
- Dan Michaels
- Lenny Pickett
- Jonas Kullhammar
- Courtney Pine
- Raphael Ravenscroft
- David Roach
- Tom Scott
- James Senese
- Wayne Shorter
- Bruno Spoerri
- Pedro Eustache
- John L. Walters
- Dallas Smith
- Charles "Prince Charles" Alexander
- Chris Wood
- Takeshi Itoh

== Notes ==
- Greenberg, Joy (2006) "A Pause in the Rain" ISBN 1-60145-018-4
- Ingham, Richard (1998) The Cambridge Companion to the Saxophone ISBN 0-521-59666-1
- Search For Expression’ by John L. Walters Sound on Sound magazine, September 1987
