= Chuck Greenberg (musician) =

American musician

- Born: March 25, 1950; Chicago, Illinois, U.S.
- Died: September 4, 1995 (aged 45) Santa Cruz, California, U.S.
- Genres: New-age; electronic
- Occupations: Musician; composer; producer
- Instrument: Lyricon
- Years active: 1970s–1995
- Label: Windham Hill
- Website: chuckgreenberg.wordpress.com

Chuck Greenberg (March 25, 1950 – September 4, 1995), born in Chicago, Illinois, was an American musician, composer, and producer.

He began his musical career in the Midwest, including a backup-band tour with the Bee Gees, then relocated to Los Angeles, California, in 1978. Through Greenberg's band Shadowfax, first formed in 1972, his success as a producer and musician was marked by a series of recordings, with Alex De Grassi and William Ackerman, beginning in 1982 on the Windham Hill label. Shadowfax won a Grammy in 1988 for Best New Age Performance for Folksongs for a Nuclear Village. This ground-breaking work combined elements of jazz, rock, folk, and world music.

His work on the lyricon, the first electronic wind controller, which he helped develop with engineer Bill Bernardi, became the signature sound of Shadowfax.

In live performances, Greenberg appeared as a featured artist at Carnegie Hall, the Montreux Jazz Festival, the Ravinia Festival, the Greek Theater, Wolf Trap, Red Rocks Ampitheatre, and the Universal Theater, among other venues. His final work was a live Shadowfax recording and full-length concert in Santa Cruz, California, in 1995.

He died aged 45 on Santa Cruz Island, on September 4, 1995, after suffering a heart attack, leaving a wife and three sons.

== Discography ==
- From a Blue Planet (1991)
