= List of Armenian composers =

This is an alphabetical list of Armenian composers.

== A ==
- Ruben Aharonyan (born 1947)
- Rolf Agop (1908–1998)
- Alain Altinoglu (born 1975)
- Charles Amirkhanian (born 1945)
- Robert Amirkhanyan (born 1939)
- Izabella Arazova (born 1936)
- Alexander Arutiunian (1920–2012)
- Sahan Arzruni (born 1943)
- Sergei Aslamazyan (1897–1978)
- Artur Avanesov (born 1980)
- Khachatur Avetisyan (1926–1996)
- Artemi Ayvazyan (1902–1975)

== B ==
- Arno Babajanian (1921–1983)
- Vahram Babayan (born 1948)
- Edvard Baghdasaryan (1922–1987)
- Sergey Balasanian (1902–1982)
- Sargis Barkhudaryan (1887–1973)
- Sarkavag Berdaktsi (16th century)
- Eve Beglarian (1958-present)
- Hampartzoum Berberian (1905–1999)
- Schahan Berberian (1891–1956)
- Cathy Berberian (1925–1983)
- Gilbert Biberian (1944–2023)

== C ==
- Gayane Chebotaryan (1918–1998)
- Levon Chaushian (1946–2022)
- Geghuni Hovannesi Chitchian (born 1929)
- Loris Ohannes Chobanian (1933–2023)
- Tigran Chukhajian (1837–1898)

== D ==
- Harutiun Dellalian (1937–1990)
- Yeghia Dndesian (1834–1881)
- Vyacheslav Dobrynin (1946-2024)
- Paghtasar Dpir (1683–1768)
- Ohan Durian (1922–2011)

== E ==
- Alexey Ekimyan (1927–1982)
- Kemani Tatyos Ekserciyan (1858–1913)
- Stéphan Elmas (1862–1937)
- Angelo Ephrikian (1913–1982)

== G ==
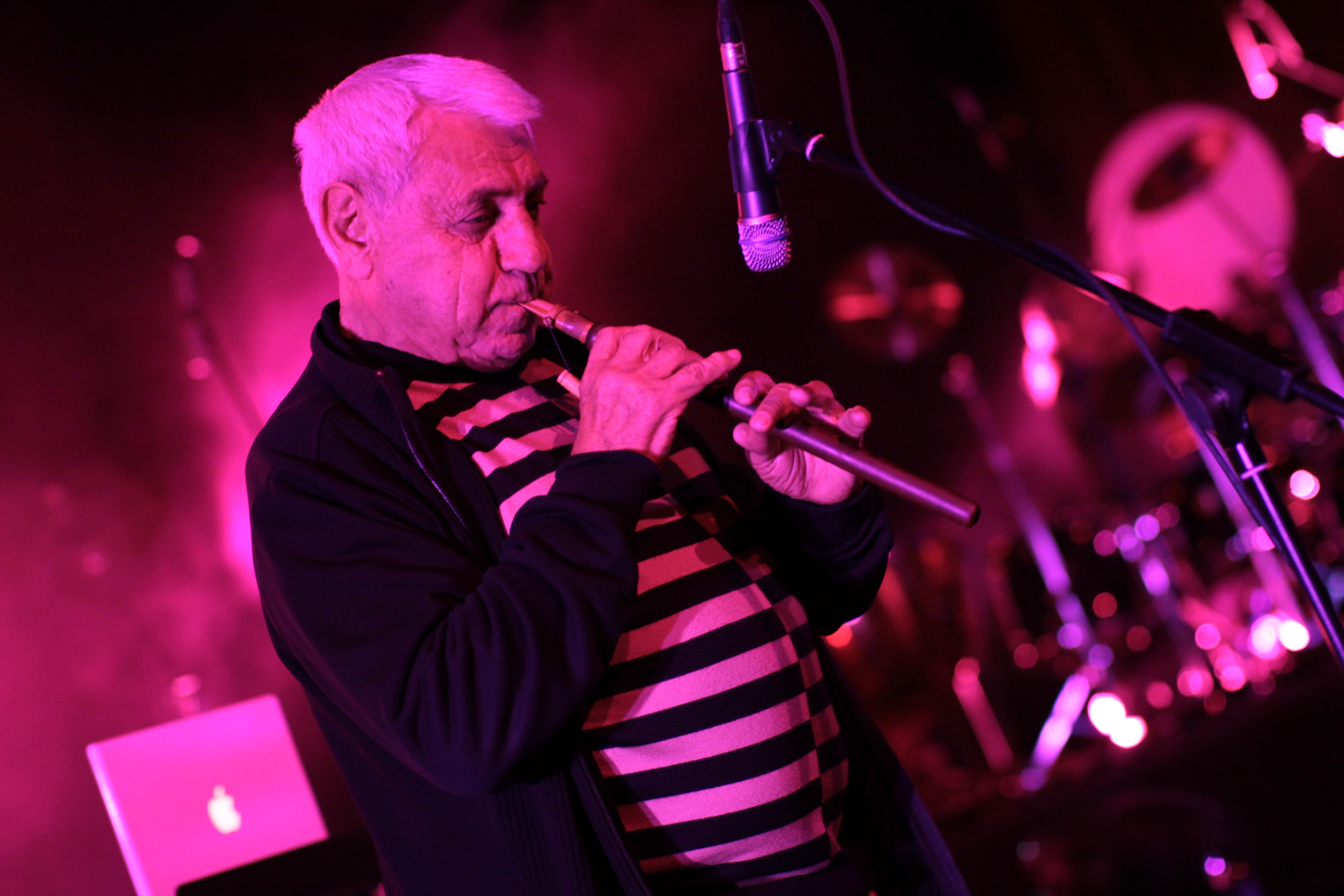
Djivan Gasparyan

- Nicol Galanderian (1881–1944)
- Georgy Garanian (1934–2010)
- Georges Garvarentz (1932–1993)
- Djivan Gasparyan (1928–2021)
- Koharik Gazarossian (1907–1967)
- Anoushavan Ter-Ghevondyan (1887–1961)
- Hambarsoom Grigorian (1893–1975)

== H ==
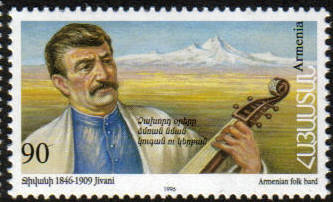
Jivani

- Varoujan Hakhbandian (1936–1977)
- Tigran Hamasyan (born 1987)
- Harutyun Hanesyan (1911–1987)
- Eduard Hayrapetyan (born 1949)
- Alan Hovhaness (1911–2000)
- Edgar Hovhannisyan (1930–1998)
- Gagik Hovunts (1930–2019)

== J ==
- Jivani (1846–1909)
- Mihail Jora (1891–1971)

== K ==
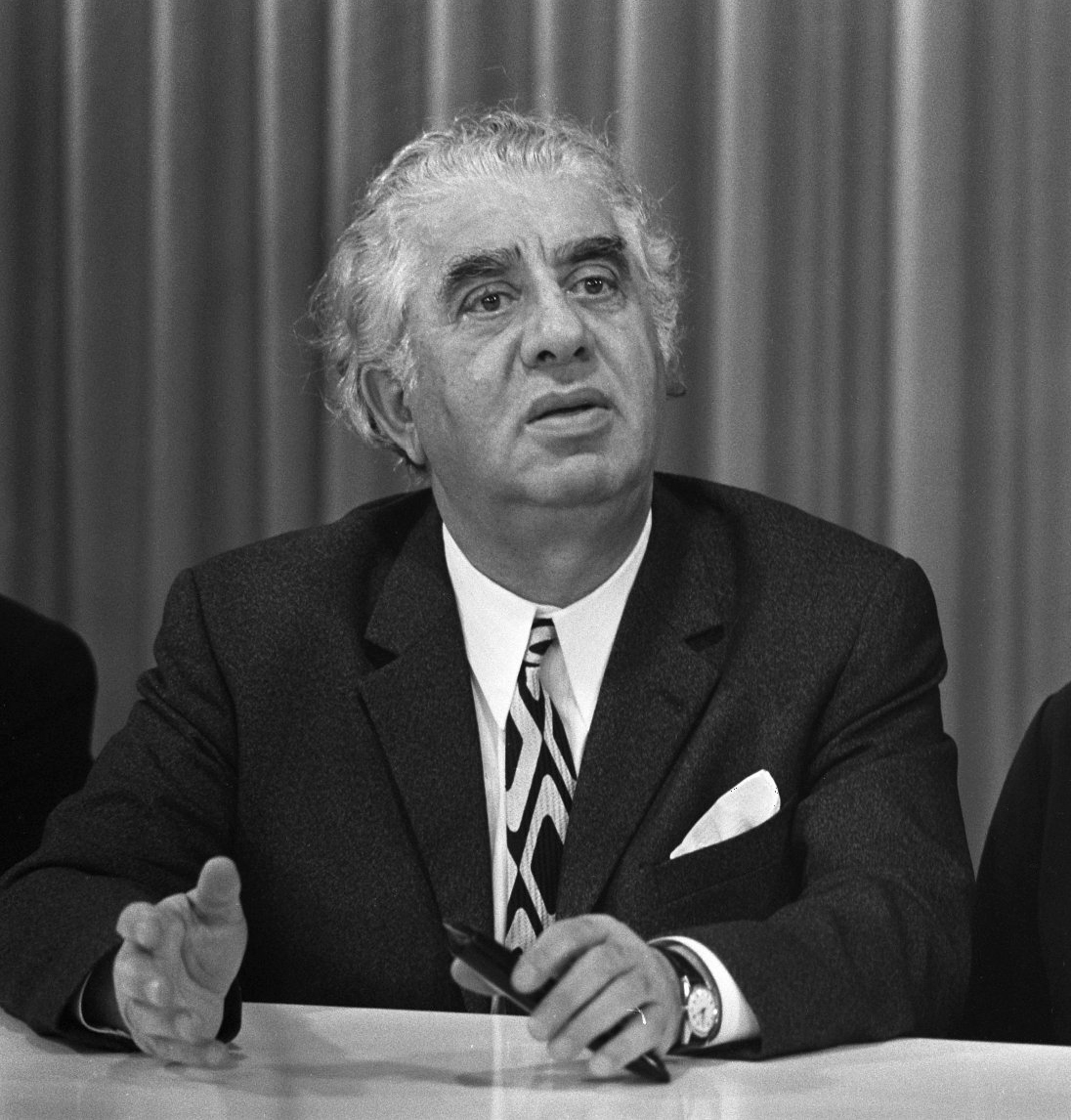
Aram Khachaturian

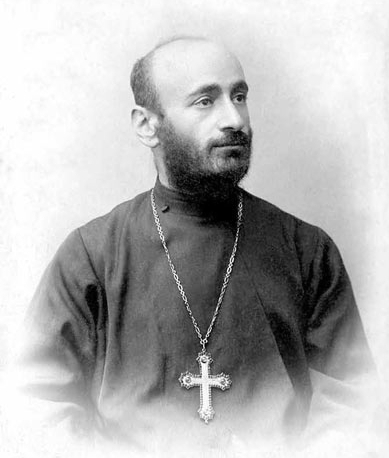
Komitas

- Krikor Kalfayan (1873–1949)
- Sirvart Kalpakyan Karamanuk (1912–2008)
- Andrey Kasparov (born 1966)
- Yuri Kasparov (born 1955)
- Rita Kassabian (born ?)
- Aram Khachaturian (1903–1978)
- Karen Khachaturian (1920–2011)
- Khosrovidukht (lived in 8th century)
- Adam Khudoyan (1921–2000)
- Komitas (1869–1935)
- Mary Kouyoumdjian (1983-present)

== L ==
- Hampartsoum Limondjian (1768–1839)

== M ==
- Edgar Manas (1875–1964)
- Tigran Mansurian (1939)
- Edward Manukyan (born 1981)
- Mekhitar of Ayrivank (13th century)
- Aleksandr Melik-Pashayev (1905–1964)
- Romanos Melikian (1883–1935)
- Spiridon Melikyan (1880–1933)
- Hrachya Melikyan (1947–2006)
- Karol Mikuli (1821–1897)
- Edvard Mirzoyan (1921–2012)
- Stanisław Moniuszko (1819–1872)
- Georgi Movsesyan (1945–2011)
- Vano Muradeli (1908–1970)
- Vazgen Muradian (1921–2018)

== N ==
- Nerses IV the Gracious (1102–1173)
- Sayat-Nova (1712–1795)

== O ==
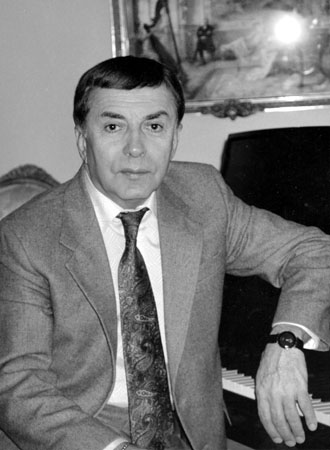
Konstantin Orbelyan

- Konstantin Orbelyan (1928–2014)

== P ==
- Stepan Papelyan (1875–1960)
- Boris Parsadanian (1925–1997)
- Krzysztof Penderecki (1933–2020)
- Konstantin Petrossian (born 1946)
- Michel Petrossian (born 1973)

== R ==
- Stepan Rostomyan (born 1956)

== S ==
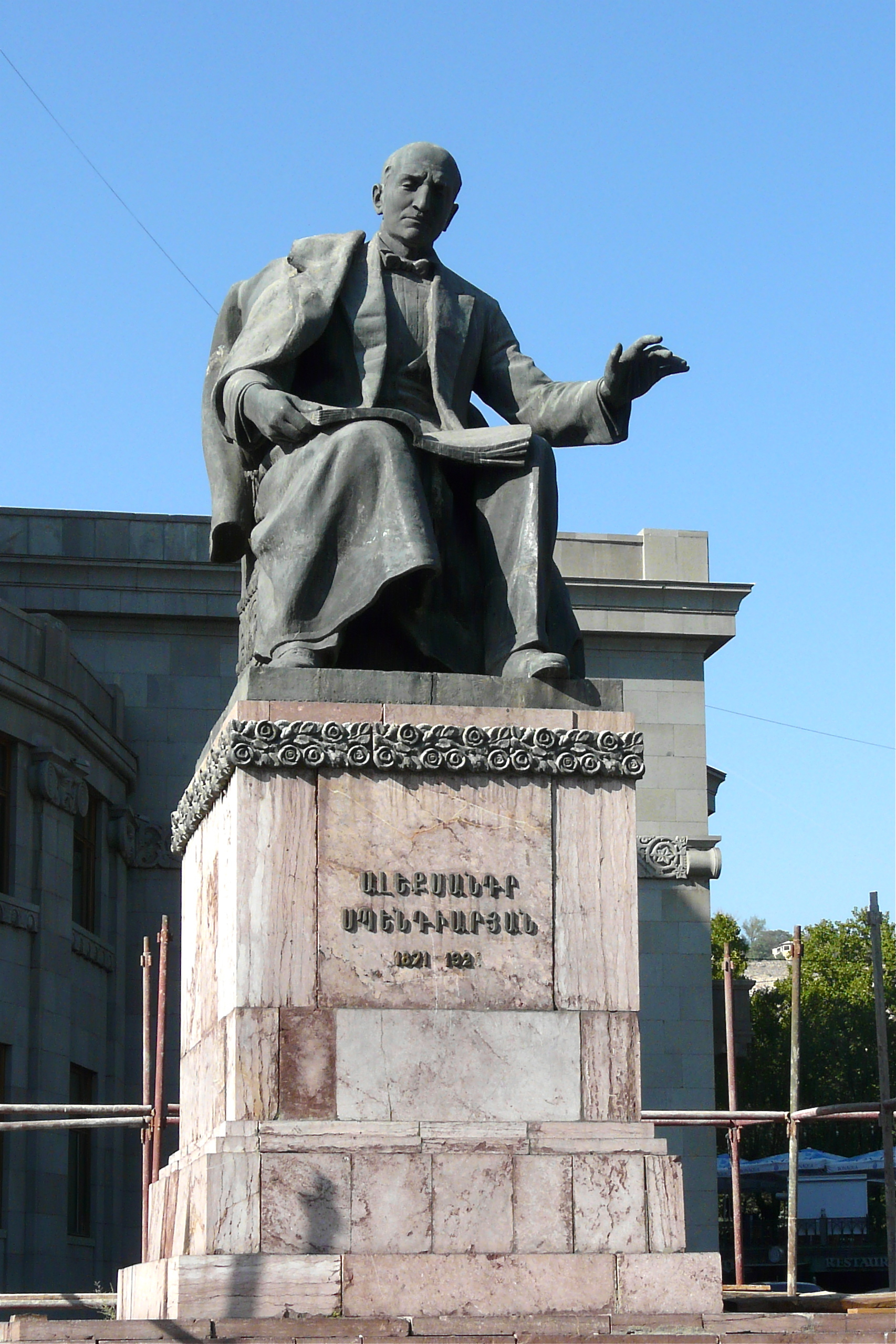
Alexander Spendiaryan

- Sahakdukht (lived in 8th century)
- Vardan Sardaryan (born 1962)
- Ruben Sargsyan (1945–2013)
- Vahram Sargsyan (born 1981)
- Ashot Satyan (1906–1958)
- Ghazaros (Lazar) Saryan (1920–1998)
- Aram Satian (born 1947)
- David Satian (born 1979)
- Vache Sharafyan (born 1966)
- Petros Shoujounian (born 1957)
- Matei Socor (1908–1980)
- Alexander Spendiaryan (1871–1928)
- Vahagn Stepanyan (born 1985)
- Grikor Suni (1876–1939)

== T ==
- Mikael Tariverdiev (1931–1996)
- Khachatur of Taron (d. 1184)
- Ohannes Tchekidjian (born 1929)
- Avet Terterian (1929–1994)
- Alicia Terzian (born 1934)
- Armen Tigranian (1879–1950)
- Nikoghayos Tigranian (1856–1951)
- Loris Tjeknavorian (born 1937)
- David Tukhmanov (born 1940)
- Onno Tunç (1948–1996)

== W ==
- William Weiner (born 1955)

== Y ==
- Grigor Yeghiazaryan (1908–1988)
- Makar Yekmalyan (1856–1905)

== See also ==
- Chronological list of Armenian classical composers
- List of American musicians of Armenian descent
