= List of Armenian classical composers =

== Medieval ==
- Khosrovidukht (8th century)
- Sahakdukht (8th century)
- Nerses IV the Gracious (c. 1102 – 1173)
- Mekhitar of Ayrivank (c. 1230 – c. 1300)

== Baroque ==
- Paghtasar Dpir (1683–1768)

== Classical era ==
- Hampartsoum Limondjian (1768–1839)

== Romantic ==
- Karol Mikuli (1819–1897)
- Dikran Tchouhadjian (1837–1898)
- Makar Ekmalyan (1856–1905)
- Nikoghayos Tigranian (1856–1951)
- Kemani Tatyos Ekserciyan (1858–1913)
- Stéphan Elmas (1862–1937)
- Komitas (1869–1935)
- Alexander Spendiaryan (1871–1928)
- Edgar Manas (1875–1964)
- Grikor Suni (1876–1939)
- Armen Tigranian (1879–1950)
- Romanos Melikian (1883–1935)
- Sargis Barkhudaryan (1887–1973)

== Modern/Contemporary ==
- Anton Mailyan (1880–1942)
- Nicol Galanderian (1881–1944)
- Schahan Berberian (1891–1956)
- Sergei Aslamazyan (1897–1978)
- Artemi Ayvazyan (1902–1975)
- Aram Khachaturian (1903–1978)
- Kurken Alemshah (1907–1947)
- Koharik Gazarossian (1907–1967)
- Grigor Yeghiazaryan (1908–1998)
- Sirvart Kalpakyan Karamanuk (1912–2008)
- Gayane C'ebotaryan (1918–1998)
- Ghazaros (Lazar) Saryan (1920–1998)
- Karen Khachaturian (1920–2011)
- Alexander Arutiunian (1920–2012)
- Arno Babajanian (1921–1983)
- Adam Khudoyan (1921–2000)
- Edvard Mirzoyan (1921–2012)
- Edvard Baghdasaryan (1922–1987)
- Boris Parsadanian (1925–1997)
- Khachatur Avetisyan (1926–1996)
- Garbis Aprikian (1926–2024)
- Konstantin Orbelyan (1928–2014)
- Geghuni Hovannesi Chitchian (born 1929)
- Avet Terterian (1929–1994)
- Edgar Hovhannisyan (1930–1998)
- Iosif Andriasov (1933–2000)
- Loris Ohannes Chobanian (1933–2023)
- Izabella Arazova (born 1936)
- Tigran Mansurian (born 1939)
- Sahan Arzruni (born 1943)
- Levon Chaushian (1946–2022)
- Aram Satian (born 1947)
- Vartan Adjemian (born 1956)
- Vache Sharafyan (born 1966)
- Artur Avanesov (born 1980)
- Vahram Sargsyan (born 1981)

== See also ==
- List of Armenian composers
