= List of American musicians of Armenian descent =

This is a list of famous Armenian American musicians. For other famous Armenian Americans, see List of Armenian Americans.

- Adiss Harmandian – pop singer
- Alan Hovhaness – among the most prolific of 20th-century composers
- Albert Asriyan – violinist, composer, arranger and band leader
- Anahid Ajemian – violinist
- Angel Deradoorian – experimental rock singer-songwriter, multi-instrumentailist, producer. She is known for her work with Dirty Projectors
- Ani Kavafian – classical violinist
- Anita Darian - soprano - vocalist - The Lion Sleeps Tonight
- Ara Babajian – drummer and member of Leftöver Crack and The Slackers
- Ara Berberian – operatic bass singer
- Ara Dinkjian – oudist
- Armand Tokatyan – operatic tenor
- Armen Anassian – violinist
- Armen Chakmakian – composer
- Armen Donelian – jazz pianist
- Armen Nalbandian – jazz pianist, and composer
- Armen Ra – artist and performer
- Armenian Jazz Sextet – group playing Armenian music
- Arto Tunçboyacıyan - musician
- Beatrice Ohanessian – pianist, notable for being Iraq's first concert pianist and first female composer
- Berj Zamkochian – organist
- Bruce Nazarian – Producer, Recording Artist, Studio Musician, Composer, Lyricist. Two Billboard chart appearances as lead vocalist.
- Cathy Berberian – composer, mezzo-soprano singer, and vocalist
- Charles Amirkhanian – composer
- Cher – pop singer-songwriter
- Clint Bajakian – video game composer and musician
- Daron Malakian – singer-songwriter, multi-instrumentalist, and record producer, lead guitarist, songwriter, and occasional vocalist of the Grammy Award-winning metal band System of a Down. He placed 30th in Guitar World's List of The 100 Greatest Heavy Metal Guitarists of All Time
- Dennis Agajanian – Christian musician
- Derek Sherinian – among the elite rock keyboardists in the world
- Dianne Goolkasian Rahbee – classical composer
- Duane Betts – singer-songwriter and guitarist
- Edward Manukyan – composer
- Eleanor Barooshian – singer-songwriter
- Eve Beglarian – composer
- Gracie Terzian - singer-songwriter, jazz ukulele player
- Grikor Suni – composer
- Gerard Jirayr Svazlian – violinist
- Greg Jehanian – bassist and backing vocalist, member of indie rock band mewithoutYou
- Haig Mardirosian – concert organist, composer, and conductor
- Haroutioun Hovanes Chakmakjian – composer
- Harry Babasin – jazz bassist
- Ida Kavafian – classical violinist and violist
- Ivan Galamian – influential violin teacher of the twentieth century
- Jeff Atmajian – arranger and orchestrator
- Jeff Manookian - composer and conductor
- John Berberian – oudist
- John Dolmayan – songwriter, drummer, and member of System of a Down
- John Herald – folk and bluegrass songwriter, solo and studio musician, and one-time member of The Greenbriar Boys trio
- Kallen Esperian – lyric soprano
- Karine Poghosyan - pianist
- KÁRYYN - composer and electronic musician
- Kim Kashkashian – violist
- Konstantin Orbelyan, Jr. – pianist, and conductor of State Academic Chamber Orchestra of Russia
- Levon Ambartsumian – violinist and conductor
- Lucine Amara- soprano
- Maro Ajemian – pianist
- Michael Gulezian – composer and Fingerstyle guitarist
- Michael Omartian – singer-songwriter, keyboardist, and music producer
- Ontronik Khachaturian – singer-songwriter, multi-instrumentalist, record producer, and drummer member of System of a Down
- Paul Motian – jazz drummer, percussionist and composer of Armenian extraction
- Peter Dombourian – music educator, and conductor
- Raffi Besalyan - pianist
- Richard Hagopian – oudist, violinist, and clarinet
- Richard Yardumian – classical music composer
- Ross Bagdasarian, Sr. – pianist, singer, and songwriter
- Roupen Altiparmakian- violinist and oudist
- Şahan Arzruni – pianist, composer, and ethnomusicologist
- Serj Tankian – rock singer–songwriter, multi-instrumentalist, record producer, poet, philosopher and a political activist, best known as the lead vocalist, songwriter, keyboardist, and occasionally live rhythm guitarist of the Grammy Award-winning rock band, System of a Down
- Shavo Odadjian – songwriter, multi-instrumentalist, music video director/editor, music producer, and artist/painter, best known as the bassist and occasional songwriter of the Grammy Award-winning rock band, System of a Down
- Sib Hashian – drummer and member of the rock band Boston
- Stephanie Nakasian – jazz vocalist and voice teacher
- Sylvie Vartan – singer
- Tamar Kaprelian – singer
- Tonio K – singer/songwriter
