= Anton Mailyan =

Armenian composer (1880–1942)

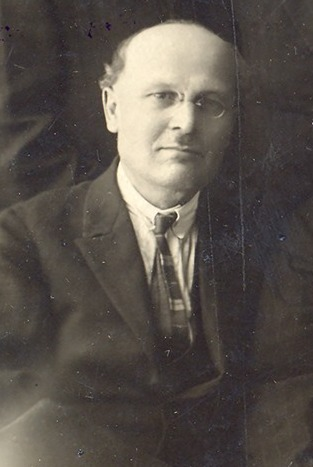

Background information
- Born: March 16 (28), 1880; Tbilisi, Caucasus Viceroyalty of the Russian Empire
- Died: April 20, 1942 (aged 62) Baku, Azerbaijan SSR, Soviet Union
- Genres: Classical music, opera, ballet, comedy
- Occupations: composer, prose writer, librettist, conductor, folklorist
- Years active: 1905–1942

Anton Mayilyan (Armenian: Անտոն Մայիլյան, 1880–1942) was an Armenian Soviet composer, musical and public figure, prose writer, librettist, conductor, teacher, folklorist and Honored art worker of Azerbaijani SSR.

== Biography ==
He was born on March 28, 1880, in the city of Tbilisi. There he graduated from the Nersisian School and studied at the teacher's seminary in Tbilisi from Makar Yekmalyan and H. Kara-Murza. Then in 1900–1903 he studied at the Tbilisi Musical College in the composition class of N. D. Nikolaev.

He began his career as a composer in 1905. In 1906, he taught singing at the Tbilisi teacher's seminary. From 1906 he lived and worked in Baku, where in 1908 he created the first working choir here.

In 1910-1917, he published in Baku the monthly Armenian magazine Tatron yev yerazhshtutyun (Theatre and Music). On the pages of the magazine, questions of the development of the music of the East were developed. During the World War I he constantly participated in charity evenings organized by Armenians in Baku. So in 1915 he took part in the second Armenian charity evening in favor of refugees called Even or Odd. Armenian folk songs were performed in the evening, the song Kele-kele performed to the music of Anton Mayilyan was especially successful.

In 1918-1919 he continued to teach music in Tbilisi for years and since 1920 he was again in Baku. From 1925 he headed the musical section of the Baku House of Armenian Art. He also collected musical folklore of the peoples of the Caucasus and Transcaucasia and was the author of literary works (the novel Armen, 1900; the stories The Orphan, 1897, Sad Moments, 1900).

In 1930, he was awarded the honorary title Honored art worker of the Azerbaijan SSR and on April 17, 1938, he was awarded the Order of the Badge of Honour.

He died on April 20, 1942, in Baku and was buried on April 24 at the Armenian cemetery in Baku.

== Awards ==
- Honored art worker of the Azerbaijan SSR (04/17/1930)
- Order of the Badge of Honour (1938)

== Works ==
=== Music ===
- Khatabala by G. Sundukian, Uncle Baghdasar by H. Baronian, In 1905 by J. Jabbarly, Othello by W. Shakespeare and Don Quixote by Miguel de Cervantes.

=== Operas ===
- The Tale of Grandmother Gulnaz by G. Aghayan (1906), Beautiful Spring (1925), Bone of Happiness (1926), Playful Mikich by H. Tumanyan (1926), Zizik (1926), Frog (1926), The Wizard, the Rose and the Worm (1928).
- Gulli (on his own libretto, 1930).
- Safa (libretto by Mammed Said Ordubadi, 1933; first production at the Azerbaijan State Academic Opera and Ballet Theater, 1939), dedicated to the struggle of Armenian and Azerbaijani peasants against the feudal lords in the 18th century.

=== Musical dramas ===
- Gikor (to his own libretto, after H. Tumanyan, 1923)
- Sari Sumbul (to own libretto, 1923)
- Mignon (on his own libretto, for children, 1923).

=== Musical comedies ===
- The English Bridegroom (on his own libretto, 1919).
- Tmblach Hagan (on his own libretto, 1929).
- Tmblach Hagan in Paris (on his own libretto, 1929).
- Molla Nasreddin (1940).

=== Ballet ===
- Indian Beauty (based on Nizami's poem Haft Peykar, 1941).

== See also ==
- Makar Yekmalyan
- Hovhannes Tumanyan
- List of Armenian composers

== Sources ==
- Atayan, Robert (1956). Armenian composers. — Yerevan.
- Manukyan M. Anton Mailyan. Life and activity. — Yerevan: Hayastan, 1965. — 83 p.
- Azerbaijan Soviet Encyclopedia. Vol. 6. 1982. — p. 303
- Маїлян Антон Сергійович // Shevchenko encyclopedia: — Vol. 4: M—Pa : in 6 vols. / Gol. ed. M. G. Zhulynskyi. — Kyiv: Institute of Literature named after T. G. Shevchenko, 2013. — p. 22.
