= Tigranyan =

Tigranyan, or alternatively Tigranian, or Dikranian in Western Armenian (Armenian: Տիգրանյան) is an Armenian surname, coming from the given name Tigran or Western Armenian Dikran. Notable people with the surname include:

- Armen Tigranian or Tigranyan or Dikranian (1879–1950), Armenian music composer and conductor
- Armen Tigranyan (born 1985), Armenian football (soccer) player
- Nikoghayos Tigranian (1856–1951), Armenian composer, ethnomusicologist and pianist
