= Hrachya Melikyan =

Armenian composer

- Born: Hrachya Melikyan; 8 May 1947 (age 79); Yerevan, Armenia
- Died: March 6, 2006 (aged 58) Yerevan, Armenia
- Genres: Modern Classical, Soundtrack
- Occupations: Composer, Film composer
- Instruments: Piano, keyboard, Clarinet
- Years active: 1968–2006
- Website: hrachyamelikyan.com

Hrachya Melikyan (Armenian: Հրաչյա Մելիքյան, Armenian pronunciation: [hrɑːtʃja melikˈjɑːn]; May 8, 1947 – March 6, 2006) was an Armenian music composer and film composer. Hrachya Melikyan synthesized world music developments and national music particularities, forging his own characteristic and distinctive musical style. The majority of his compositions are instrumentals, including symphonic, chamber, as well as ensemble compositions. Melikyan also composed numerous choir compositions, romances, pieces for different instruments, as well as music to films including The Ingenious Peasant. He was a member of the Union of Composers and Musicologists from 1972 and the Vice President of the Union of Composers and Musicologists of Armenia from 1991 until his untimely death in March 2006.

== Early life ==
Hrachya Melikyan was born on May 8, 1947, in Yerevan, Armenia, to an attorney and an accountant. Hrachya, his brother and sisters excelled in their studies at school. As his siblings aspired towards engineering and physics, Hrachya's dream was to study musical. Early on while in elementary school, he bought a guitar with the pocket money he had been saving for some time and began to play. Shortly after, he also began playing the accordion (self-taught). The last years in secondary school he was actively involved with the school's music group, acting as a conductor and playing the accordion. In 1962 his determination brought him to a music school at the age of 15 – being accepted to a music school at this age was unusual - where he started playing the clarinet (class of Lavchyan). He finished school in two years vs. the traditional five, then continued his studies in the Yerevan State Music College where he was enrolled on the clarinet track while also studying composing under the guidance of Professor Emin Aristakesyan. His father was not in favor of his son pursuing a musical career. To please his family, Hrachya was simultaneously preparing for entrance exams to the law faculty of the Yerevan State University. However, one day he came home and announced his acceptance to the Yerevan State Conservatory. In 1967, at the age of 20, he entered the composition department of the Yerevan State Conservatory, class of USSR People's Artist, Professor Edvard Mirzoyan. As Mirzoyan admitted, "I have to confess that he was one of my favorite students during my lengthy teaching career. Working with him was a pleasure for me."

== Student years ==
During his student years he took up the study of various woodwind instruments. He mastered playing the piano so well that he performed not only his own pieces but also the compositions of his fellow composers. Arno Babajanyan, a renowned Armenian composer and pianist advised him more than once to seriously consider a career of a pianist, a piece of advice he did not follow.

Melikyan was actively composing in his student years already. His Sonata for the Clarinet and Piano won a prize at the 3rd All-Union competition of Young Composers. His works composed during his student years were published by the Conservatory and were performed in Yerevan, Tbilisi, Baku, Kiev and other capitals of the former Soviet republics.

== Musical style ==
Hrachya Melikyan was an Armenian contemporary composer associated with the generation of the 1960s and 1970s. His artistic style developed through the interaction of Armenian and international musical practices, combining elements of contemporary world music with Armenian national musical traditions.

Ghazaros (Lazar) Saryan in his reference letter, dated July 1, 1972, for Melikyan to be accepted as a member of the Union of Composers, wrote "His style is interesting and distinctive/original. He principally avoids accepted means of expression. In his quest for new means of expression and new constructions he has achieved considerable success."

In 1972, the young composer was accepted to the Union of Composers and Musicologists of Armenia. In 1991, Melikyan became the Responsible Secretary of the Union and served in that position until his death in March 2006. In 1995 he established "Archesh" publishing house at the Union of Composers. From the time he took up an administrative position in the Union until his last days he played a significant role in promoting his fellow composers' compositions through organizing concerts and publishing their works.

== Compositions ==
The first compositions that brought him recognition were String Quartet #1 and the sonata for clarinet and piano – both written during his years as a student. The latter won the III prize in the contest of young Soviet composers, held in Moscow in 1969.

Shortly after 1969, the chamber genre became the core of his compositions. The composer's wish to get out of the limits of the traditional chamber genre was obvious. It is enough to attentively look through the list of compositions to see beside the traditional string quartets, quartets for woodwinds (1972, 1974), trios of non-traditional composition for clarinet, violin and piano (1980), for violin, viola and cello, with vibraphone in part four (1990). The composition of two quintets is also noteworthy – three flutes, cello and piano (1984), flute, oboe, clarinet, bassoon and horn (1988), etc. In the 1990s Melikyan composed an octet for oboe, two clarinets (A, B), two trombones, and piano. The variety of compositions of the composer is indicative of his special interest to bring to light the different tones of instrumental timbres that complement one another.

In compositions for piano, string instruments and woodwinds, the composer singles out the woodwinds. In this context, Hrachya Melikyan's place among the Armenian composers is exceptional not only by the quantity of compositions for woodwind instruments, but also by the variety of timbral characters. And the fact that the clarinet was the first musical instrument he played, which opened the music world to him, played a significant role.

The composer's interest was not limited by genres of chamber music – concerto, quintet, quartet, trio, sonata, sonatina, pieces, etc. The opera "Alien Blood or End of Absurdity" (1989–1991) was composed by the commission of the opera house in Łódź, Poland. However, due to social and political situation at the time it was not performed and has still not been performed. The Oratorio Bells (1986), lyrics by Armenian poets, who died during the Great Patriotic War, dedicated to the 40th anniversary of the Great Patriotic War (won prizes in Republic contests), "Maddened Crowds" (1969), lyrics by Eghishe Charents, are inspired with patriotic motives.

Among his compositions are also dedications, including trios dedicated to Dmitri Shostakovich, Arno Babajanyan. Twelve elegiac duets for cello and piano dedicated to John Asatrian. Without direct reference to the particular style of the composer, Hrachya Melikyan recreates the atmosphere characteristic of the dedicatee.

Melikyan also composed music for 8 Armenian films: Orchestra Went Along the Street, short (1976), Blue Lion (1979), Visit, short (1979), Day, Awaited so Long, short (1980), Snowdrops and Edelweiss (1981), We Shall Meet Again (1984), The Ingenious Peasant, animation (1984).

A few days before his death, Melikyan traveled to Dilijan and stayed at the Composers' Resort House, where he worked on his "String Quartet No. 5", dedicated to the memory of the Armenian composer Ghazaros Saryan. The work was completed shortly before his death and was first performed soon afterward. The quartet differs stylistically from many of his earlier works in its comparatively peaceful character.

The day before his death, he signed a contract for publication of his Twelve Pieces for Cello and Piano and the String Quartet with Editions Bim, a Swiss Publishing Company. The works were published in Switzerland in 2010.

== Main compositions ==
=== Opera ===
- Alien Blood or End of Absurdity (libretto by Marina Toumas), 1989–1991

=== Ballet ===
- Samson, 1983–1984

=== Oratorio ===
- Bells, 1985–1986, (themes from folk and patriotic songs)

=== Vocal-symphonic poems ===
- Enigma, symphonic poem, 1997
- Monument to the Hero, lyrics by Armenian poets who lost their lives at the Great Patriotic War (1941–1945), 1985
- Ode of Love, a symphonic poem for a dramatic soprano with the orchestra, 1971
- Maddened Crowds, lyrics by Yeghishe Charents, Yerevan, 1969

=== Concertos ===
- In Memoriam Concerto-Epitaph for cello and orchestra, dedicated to the 90th anniversary of the Armenian Genocide, 2005
- Concerto-Dedication for piano and orchestra, dedicated to the centennial of Aram Khachatryan, 2003
- Lord the Savior, by words of prophet Isaia, a concerto for ensemble of soloists dedicated to the 1700_{th} anniversary of adoption of Christianity in Armenia (piccolo, flute, clarinet (in B), 2 horn (F), 2 trumpet (B), trombone, tuba, percussion, piano, solo soprano and choir), 2001
- #2 for 8 performers, Voice of the Crying in the Desert for oboe, two clarinets (A, B), two trombones, and piano, 1995, dedicated to the 80th anniversary of the Armenian Genocide
- #1 for 8 performers, 1974 (published by Soviet Composer, Moscow, 1983)

for cello with chamber orchestra #2, 1995 for bassoon with chamber orchestra, 1990

- Concerto-Song for cello with chamber orchestra #1, dedicated to Medea Abrahamyan, 1989
- Concerto-Dreams for violin with chamber orchestra, 1987, 2004 (2nd edition)
- Concerto-Pastorale for piano and chamber orchestra, 1985

=== Chamber-instrumental music ===
==== Sextet ====
- 6 Miniatures for Brass (2 trumpet (B), 2 horn (F), trombone and tuba), 2002

==== Quintets ====
- #1 for flute, oboe, clarinet (B), bassoon and horn (F), 1990
- Deserted Cell for three flutes, cello and piano, 1988

==== Quartets ====
- String Quartet #5, dedicated to the memory of Ghazaros Saryan, 2005
- String Quartet #4, 1996
- String Quartet #3, 1990
- String Quartet #2, 1972
- String Quartet #1, 1969 (published by Sovetakan Grogh, Yerevan, 1983)

==== Quartets for the wood-wind ====
- #1, 1974 (published by Soviet Composer, Moscow, 1978)
- #2, 1972

==== Trio ====
- #3 for violin, viola and cello (with vibraphone in part 4), 1990
- #2 for violin, cello and piano, dedicated to the memory of Arno Babajanyan, 1989
- #1 for clarinet, violin and piano, dedicated to the memory of D. D. Shostakovich, 1980 (published by Soviet Composer, Moscow, 1984)

==== Sonatas ====
- for violin and piano #2, 1992
- for bassoon and piano, 1987
- for violin and piano #1, 1982 (published in Yerevan, 1983)
- for flute and piano, 1979 (published by Soviet Composer, Moscow, 1981)
- #2 for piano, 1978 (published in Yerevan, 1989)
- for oboe and piano, 1972 (published by Soviet Composer, Moscow, 1975)
- #1 for piano, 1968 (published in Yerevan, 1984)
- for clarinet and piano, 1968 (published by Soviet Composer, 1976)
- for viola and piano, 1968 (published in Yerevan, 1974)

==== Sonatinas ====
- Three Virtuoso Sonatinas for Piano, 1983 (published in Yerevan, 1984)
- for clarinet and piano, 1983 (published by Soviet Composer, Moscow, 1985)

==== Pieces ====
- 4 preludes for violin ensemble, 1986
- Twelve pieces for cello and piano, 1985 (published in Yerevan, 2000)
- Grace, twelve etudes-miniatures for bassoon solo," 1976 (published by Soviet Composer, Moscow, 1982)
- In the World of Fairy Tales twenty-four piano pieces, 1971–1971 (published in Yerevan, 1976)

=== Original movie soundtracks ===
- Orchestra Went Along the Street, short (1976)
- Blue Lion (1979)
- Visit, short (1979)
- Day, Awaited so Long, short (1980)
- Snowdrops and Edelweiss (1981)
- We Shall Meet Again (1984)
- The Ingenious Peasant, animation (1984)

Above listed are compositions that represent the composer’s works. Melikyan also composed numerous choir compositions, romances, pieces for different instruments...

== Awards and prizes ==
In 2005 Melikyan became the Laureate of the State Prize, a biannual prestigious prize awarded by the President of Armenia to prominent people representing Armenian culture (only one person gets the award in each respective area – music, art, literature, theater and cinematography). The Prize was awarded for three concertos – In Memoriam Concerto-Epitaph for cello and orchestra, dedicated to the 90th anniversary of the Armenian genocide, 2005; Concerto-Dedication for piano and orchestra, dedicated to the centennial of Aram Khachatryan, 2003; and Concerto-Dreams for violin with chamber orchestra, 1987, 2004 (2nd edition).

In 1995, Melikyan became a laureate of the prize of the "Best Cello Concerto" contest, sponsored by "HOVARTZ" (USA) and the Union of Composers and Musicologists of Armenia.

In 1969, the composer became a laureate of the prize of the young composers of the Soviet Union, since then he was repeatedly a laureate of different Republic contests.
