= Şahan Arzruni =

Armenian-Turkish pianist, composer and lecturer (1943–2026)

- Շահան Արծրունի
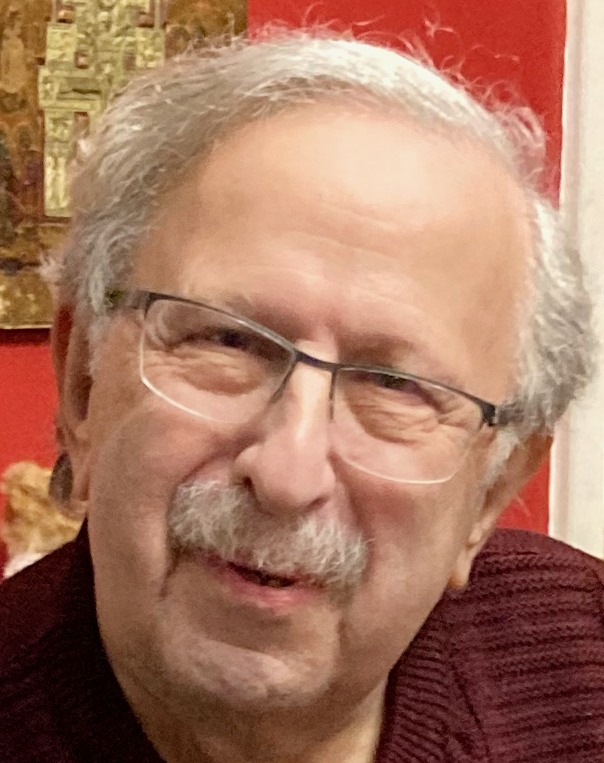
- Arzruni in 2026
- Born: 8 June 1943; Istanbul, Turkey
- Died: 21 October 2026 (aged 83); New York City, U.S.
- Education: Istanbul University State Conservatory; Juilliard School
- Occupations: Classical pianist; Music producer; Writer
- Awards: Movses Khorenatsi medal
- Website: www.sahanarzruni.com

Şahan Arzruni (Turkish: [ʃaˈhan aɾzɾuˈni]; Armenian: Շահան Արծրունի; 8 June 1943 – 21 October 2026) was a Turkish-Armenian pianist, music producer, musicologist and music pedagogue who was based in New York. He researched traditional Armenian music and played the works of Armenian composers, including women, introducing Armenian music to international audiences.

== Early life and education ==
Arzruni (also transliterated as Artsruni), whose family name belongs to an ancient Armenian nobility, was born in Istanbul, Turkey, on 8 June 1943. His father was Stepan Jirayr Arzruni, and mother Maryam Kalpak. Composer Sirvart Kalpakyan Karamanuk was his maternal aunt who encouraged Arzruni to play the piano at the age of four; he appeared publicly at the age of five. He received his general education at Esayan and Getronagan Armenian Lyceums. He studied at the Istanbul Municipal Conservatory (now Istanbul University State Conservatory), piano with Ferdi Statzer and harmony with Raşit Abed.

He moved to New York City in 1964 to study further at the Juilliard School of Music on a scholarship from the Calouste Gulbenkian Foundation. There his principal teachers were Sascha Gorodnitzki in piano, Felix Galimir in chamber music, Joseph Bloch in piano literature, and Hall Overton in composition. Arzruni graduated from Juilliard, earning his Bachelor of Science degree in 1967 and a Master of Science degree in 1968. Arzruni also pursued doctoral studies at New York University.

== Career ==
Arzruni was interested in the musical roots of his Armenian heritage. He researched traditional Armenian music, recording an anthology of Armenian piano music on three LPs as well as co-producing instrumental and vocal Armenian music on eight LPs. He delivered papers and organized symposia for Columbia University, Harvard University, and University of Michigan at Ann Arbor. He was the author of books and a contributor of articles for both academic journals and several editions of the New Grove Dictionary and the Dictionary of the Middle Ages.

He was named a Steinway artist, and performed on an 1869 historic Steinway piano from the collection of the Metropolitan Museum of Art for the first of the museum's centennial celebrations. In 2001, Arzruni gave a lecture on Armenian liturgical chants in Washington, D.C., invited by the Library of Congress.

Arzruni performed with Victor Borge, in the role of straight man in Borge's concerts starting with the late 1960s, and appeared with Borge at the 1980 Royal Variety Show where they performed Borge's classic comedic arrangement for piano duo of Liszt's Hungarian Rhapsody No. 2. They appeared together for around ten years.

Arzruni played recitals for the benefit of Armenian charity causes. He focused on music by Armenian composers such as Komitas, Aram Khachaturian, Alan Hovhaness, Arno Babajanyan, Tigran Mansuryan, and Alexander Arutiunian. He appeared in television and radio broadcasts, such as The Tonight Show Starring Johnny Carson, The Mike Douglas Show and a number of PBS specials. He recorded for European radio networks, including the BBC. Arzruni performed at the White House, as well as courts in London, Copenhagen and Stockholm. In 2008, he was awarded "Honorary Professorship" from Yerevan Komitas State Conservatory in Armenia. In 2015, he was awarded the Presidential Movses Khorenatsi medal, the Republic of Armenia's highest cultural award.

In 2017 he began to travel to Armenia, supported by the Fund for Armenian Relief, to visit more than 50 places, also in the Republic of Artsakh, visiting music schools, conducting master classes and playing benefit concerts. During the COVID-19 pandemic, Arzruni curated a series of mini-concerts online, "Together for Armenia," to help Armenia financially.

Arzruni recorded for Musical Heritage Society, New World Records, Good Music Composers Recordings, Hearts of Space, Philips, Varèse Sarabande, Positively Armenian, Kalan Müzik, and AGBU.

== Personal life ==
Arzruni was based in New York City.

Arzruni died at his home in Manhattan on 21 October 2026, at the age of 83.

== Awards ==
- Movses Khorenatsi medal, 2015
- Honorary Professorship, Yerevan Komitas State Conservatory, 2008
- Order of St. Sahak and St. Mesrob, 1996
- Steinway Artist, 1994
- Renaissance Medal, 1993
- Juilliard Scholarship, 1968, 1967, 1966, 1965, 1964.
- Calouste Gulbenkian Foundation Scholarship, 1965, 1964

== Discography ==
=== Performer ===
- By Women: Piano Works by Armenian Women Composers (2024, AGBU)
- Alan Hovhaness: Selected Piano Compositions (2019, Kalan)
- Hommage: Piano Works by Early Armenian Composers (2014, Kalan)
- Komitas: Complete Works for Piano (2011, Kalan) OCLC 1277512091
- Edvard Mirzoyan: Poem, Album For My Granddaughter (2004, Charents Museum of Literature and Arts, Yerevan, Armenia)
- Childhood Memories (2001, New World Records) OCLC 1244895935
- Midnight, works by Chopin (1995, Good Music) OCLC 36304009
- Hovhaness: Visionary Landscapes (1991, Hearts of Space)
- Louise Talma: Three Bagatelles, Kaleidoscopic Variations (1987, CRI) OCLC 872379298
- An Anthology of Armenian Piano Music / 3 LPs (1979, Musical Heritage Society)
- Jerome Moross: Sonata for Piano Duet and Strings (1979, Varèse Sarabande Records)
- Haydn: Complete sonatas for piano with violin (1977, Musical Heritage Society)
- Toccatas (1974, Musical Heritage Society)
- Béla Bartók: For Children (1974, Musical Heritage Society)
- Dmitri Kabalevsky: Children's Pieces (1973, Musical Heritage Society)
- Aram Khachaturian: Children's Album I & II (1972, Musical Heritage Society)

=== Producer ===
- Armenian Composers in Asia Minor (2008, Kalan) OCLC 949576229
- Sirvart Kalpakyan Karamanuk: Memories of Love / 2 CDs (2005, Charents Museum of Literature and Arts)
- Sirvart Kalpakyan Karamanuk: Children's Songs (2003, Charents Museum of Literature and Arts)
- Sirvart Kalpakyan Karamanuk: Choral Music (2001, Albany Records)
- Makar Yekmalian: Divine Liturgy (2002, Diocese of Armenian Church of America [Eastern])
- Nikol Galanderian: Children's Songs (2001, Fund for Armenian Relief)
- Koharik Gazarossian: A Memorial Album (1997, private)
- A Survey of Armenian Music / 8 LPs – Co-producer (1987, Positively Armenian)
- Komitas: A Centenary Album / 2 LPs – Artistic Director (1970, Komitas Centennial Committee)

== Writings ==
- Քրիստափոր Կարա-Մուրզայի կեանքը կը վերածուի լաւ պատմուած զրոյցի [The Life of Kristapor Kara-Murza Evolves into an Effective Story] (in Armenian). Istanbul: Jamanak, 14 June 2014. p. 3.
