= Nikoghos Tahmizian =

Greek-Armenian historian

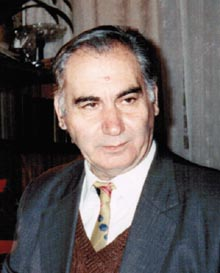
- Born: May 9, 1926; Athens, Greece
- Died: August 30, 2011 (aged 85); Pasadena, California
- Resting place: Hollywood Hills, California, United States
- Education: St. Petersburg State Conservatory
- Occupation: Musicologist
- Years active: 1960–2003
- Spouse(s): Svetlana Tahmizian, pianist
- Children: Tigran Tahmizean, composer Jivan Tahmizian, sound editor (filmmaking)

Nikoghos Tahmizian (Armenian: Նիկողոս Թահմիզյան, also spelled: Nikogos Tahmizyan; May 9, 1926 – August 30, 2011) was an Armenian musicologist, theorist and historian. His professional accomplishments were to decipher neumes (khaz) of Armenian church music, analyze the musical theory of old Armenia and research the life and works of Armenian composers from medieval times to modern era.

Tahmizian's discoveries in the area of the medieval Armenian notational system open a door to understanding and interpreting the liturgical chants (sharakan) of the period. His book Modern Neumology (2003) summarizes his forty years of research in the field. Several dozen neumatic symbols have now been revealed, defined, categorized and interpreted as a result of his work.

A page from medieval Armenian manuscript illustrating neumatic notation.

His research into the musical heritage of Armenia revealed and explained the most crucial periods in the history of Armenian music and its famous representatives. He brought to life the musical contributions of Mesrop Mashtots (5th century), Sahak Partev (Isaac of Armenia, 4th/5th century), Movses Khorenatsi (5th century), Gregory of Narek (Grigor Narekatsi, 10th century), Nerses Shnorhali (12th century), Sayat-Nova (18th century), Makar Yekmalian (19th century), Dikran Tchouhadjian (19th century), Komitas (early 20th century) and others. His work placed an overall historical perspective of the musical development in Armenia from 5th to 20th Centuries. He categorized the period from ancient times to the 12th century as an ascending era, and the timeframe from 13th to 18th centuries as a period of creative decline.

He also conducted extensive research into the theory of Armenian music from the pagan era to the church music of the 8th century A.D. In his defining book entitled 'Theory of Music in Ancient Armenia' (published in Armenia, 1977, in Russian) he interpreted and classified the modal system used during this period. He also analyzed the metric and rhythmic constructs and their formational significance. He explained the uniqueness of the Armenian oktoechos and shed light upon the conceptual and aesthetical issues of the medieval music of Armenia. Moreover, he brought into focus the specific characteristics of the Armenian modes as compared and contrasted with Persian, Arabic, Turkish, as well as Greek, Russian and Caucasian modal systems.

Throughout his career, Tahmizian published over a dozen books and around two hundred articles and essays in Armenian, Russian, English, French and Polish. He has also delivered over 60 academic lectures in universities and conservatories throughout the former Soviet Union, as well as London (1978), Rome (1981), Tokyo (1985), Paris (1989), San Francisco (1990) and New York City (1993). He contributed to the Russian Music Encyclopedia (published from 1973 to 1982 in Moscow, six volumes, in Russian), and the Armenian Soviet Encyclopedia (published from 1974 to 1987 in Yerevan, thirteen volumes, in Armenian).

== Biography ==
Tahmizian was born in Athens, Greece on May 9, 1926. He received elementary education at the local Armenian school, followed by high school at the Melkonian Educational Institute in Cyprus on a merit-based scholarship. After graduation in 1945, being recognized as a promising young musical scholar, he received a fully funded fellowship for a seven-year academic course at the Music Conservatory of Brussels, Belgium.

The "Repatriation Movement", however, initiated by the government of post-war Armenia, changed his plans. Along with over one hundred thousand Armenians (scattered around the globe as a direct result of the 1915 Genocide) he moved to Soviet Armenia in 1946. In September of that year, he was admitted and started his education at the Romanos Melikian Musical College of Yerevan, graduating in 1950. From 1950 to 1956 he attended the Musicology Department of the Yerevan Komitas State Conservatory. He completed his graduate studies with a thesis on 13th-century Armenian monk Hovhannes Erznkatsi's views on music theory. From 1947 to 1956 Tahmizian worked at the Yerevan Opera House occupying the chair of third French horn in the orchestra.

From 1956 to 1960 he completed his post-graduate studies at St. Petersburg State Conservatory under the mentorship of renowned music scholar Christopher Kushnarev. It was here that he met his future wife Svetlana Nikitina (later Svetlana Tahmizian), a musician studying with the famous pianist and organist Isay Braudo. From 1960 to 1990 he was a senior researcher at Mashtots Institute of Ancient Manuscripts (Matenadaran) in Yerevan, Armenia. During the same period he actively collaborated with the Composers' Union of Armenia, Yerevan Komitas State Conservatory and the Armenian National Academy of Sciences. Tahmizian defended his dissertation for doctoral candidacy in 1962 on the history of Armenian music from 5th to 8th centuries A.D. In 1980 he obtained an honorary doctorate degree presenting the publication of his monumental work "Theory of Music in Ancient Armenia."

In 1984 he was awarded an honorary title for his accomplishments in musical arts by the government of Armenia. In 1987 he was granted professorship of musical sciences by the music history department of the Yerevan Komitas State Conservatory.

From 1990 to 2011 he resided in Pasadena, California. He became a US citizen 1995. During this time he continued his research and involvement in Armenian music history. He published five books and a dozen articles. He also lectured in various US cities.

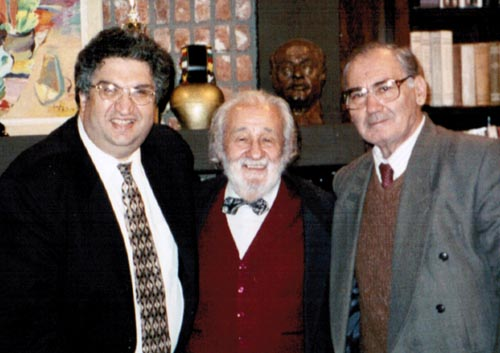
Nikoghos Tahmizian (right) with conductors Ohan Durian and Vatche Barsumian

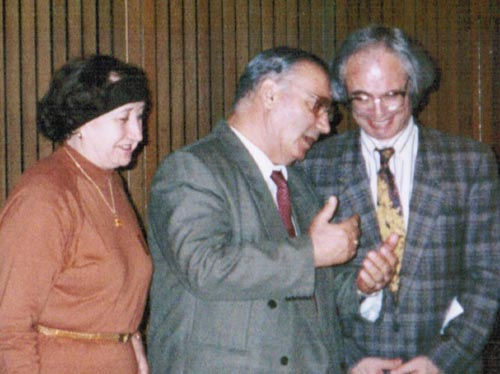
Nikoghos Tahmizian (center) with his wife Svetlana and composer Tigran Mansurian

== Books ==
- Tamburist Harutin, 18th Century, A Manual of Eastern Music (translation from Armenian-lettered Turkish into Russian, foreword and commentaries by N. Tahmizian), Yerevan, 1968, with a summary in English.
- Nerses Shnorhali (Nerses IV the Gracious 12th Century), Composer and Musician, Yerevan, 1973, in Armenian with a summary in French.
- The Theory of Music in Ancient Armenia (until the 10th Century), Yerevan, 1977, in Russian with a summary in English.
- Makar Yekmalian (Makar Yekmalian, 19th Century), Life and Works, Yerevan, 1981, in Armenian.
- Music in Ancient and Medieval Armenia (a brochure in three languages – Armenian, Russian, English), Yerevan, 1982.
- Voskeporik – Pearls of Armenian Art Song (Anthology Reflecting the Unity of Armenian Poetry and Music from 5th to 20th Centuries), Compiled and Edited by N. Tahmizian, Yerevan, 1982, foreword in Armenian, Russian and English.
- Grigor Narekatsi (Gregory of Narek, 10th Century) and Armenian Music from 5th to 15th Centuries, Yerevan, 1985, in Armenian with a summary in English.
- Music in Armenian Cilicia (1080 to 1375 A.D.), Lecturer's Manual, Yerevan, 1989, in Armenian.
- Hakobos Aivazian (19th to 20th Centuries) – A Manual of Eastern Music, translation from Western Armenian into Russian, foreword and commentaries by N. Tahmizian, Yerevan, 1989, with an English summary. ISBN 5-8080-0110-2
- Voskeporik – Pearls of Armenian Art Song – Revised and Extended Version, Drazark Press, Pasadena, CA, 1994.
- Komitas (Komitas Vardapet and the Musical Legacy of the Armenian People, in Armenian, Drazark Press, Pasadena, CA, 1994.
- Sayat-Nova and the Armenian Minstrel Tradition, in Armenian, Drazark Press, Pasadena, CA, 1995.
- Tigran Chukhajian – Life and Work, in Armenian, Drazark Press, Pasadena, CA, 1999.
- Modern Neumology, in Armenian, Drazark Press, Pasadena, CA, 2003

== Articles and publications ==
- A Page from Early Medieval Armenian Musical Theory, (in Armenian), Banber Matenadarani publication, Yerevan, 1960 v. 5.
- Pages from the Early Medieval Armenian Musical Aesthetics, (in Armenian), Armenian National Academy of Sciences, Yerevan, 1961, v. 2.
- The Study of Sound in Ancient and Medieval Armenia, (in Armenian), Banber Matenadarani publication, Yerevan, 1962, v. 6.
- On the Melodies of Sayat-Nova's Armenian Language Songs, (in Armenian), Armenian National Academy of Sciences, Yerevan, 1963, v. 10.
- Pages from the Medieval Armenian Musical Aesthetics, (in Armenian), Etchmiadzin publication, Armenia, 1963, v. 11.
- Mesrop Mashtots and the Art of Armenian Sacred Music, (in Armenian), Banber Matenadarani publication, Yerevan, 1964, v. 7.
- An Analytical Survey of the Ancient and Medieval History of Armenian Music until 19th Century, Lraber Journal of the Academy of Sciences of Armenia, Yerevan, 1970 v. 10, 1971 vv 1, 5, 9, in Armenian.
- Monodische Denkmaler Alt – Armeniens. Die Tradition Der Armenischen Psalmodie, Beitrage Zur Musikwissenschaft Publishing, Berlin, 1970, v. 1 (German).
- Les Anciens Manuscrits Musicaux Armeniens et Les Questions Relatives a Leur Dechiffrement, Revue des Études Arméniennes journal, 1970, v. 7 (French).
- Mutual Links between Armenian and Byzantine Music in the Early Middle Ages (in Polish), Muzyka Journal, Poland, 1977, v. 1.
- Position and Significance of Music in the System of Professional Arts in Medieval Armenia (5th to 15th Centuries, (in English), a publication of the Academy of Sciences of Armenia, Yerevan, 1978.
- David the Invincible (David Anhaght) and the Armenian Musical Culture, (in English), a publication of the Academy of Sciences of Armenia, Yerevan, 1980.
- The Monumental-Decorative Style in the Armenian Professional Music of the 10th to 15th Centuries, (in French), a publication of Terzo Simposio Internazionale Di Arte Armena, Venezia, 1981.
- On the Unity of the Poetic Text and Music in the Armenian Hymnal, (in French), Revue des Études Arméniennes journal, 1983, Paris, v. 17.

== Honors and titles ==
- Honorary Doctorate in Musicology, 1980, Academy of Sciences of the USSR, Moscow, USSR
- Accomplished Fellow of Arts, Academy of Sciences of Armenia, 1984, Yerevan, Armenia
- Honorary Professor, Komitas State Conservatory of Armenia, 1987, Yerevan, Armenia
