= Armenian Jazz Sextet =

Musical group

The Armenian Jazz Sextet was an Armenian-American musical group who had a minor national hit in the United States with the song "Harem Dance" in 1957.

== History ==
The group was started in 1954, by a group of six Detroit, Michigan natives who were of Armenian descent. It was formed for the purpose of performing at Armenian dances and weddings. A friend of the group gave them an opportunity to make a record, and they waxed two original compositions, "Harem Dance", an instrumental, and "Pretty Girl", a vocal. At a local performance a Detroit disc-jockey asked the group if they had any records, and they provided a copy of their record. Upon receiving airplay the disc proved highly popular locally among teenagers, and Kapp Records bought the master and distributed it nationally across the United States.

=== Chart success ===
Released on Kapp single 181, the "Harem Dance" was reviewed by Billboard as a "swingin' original weirdy" that would draw disk jockey attention. The record entered the Billboard Hot 100 on April 29, 1957, and remained for six weeks, peaking at number 67. The record performed exceptionally well in disparate regions of the United States, as it was among the top 10 sellers in Boston, Detroit, and Los Angeles. Ralph Marterie recorded a cover version on Mercury Records re-titled "Shish-Kebab".

At the time the group was receiving national exposure it was a regular Thursday night feature at Haig's Bar in Detroit.

== Instrumentation and personnel ==
The instrumentation used by the group was a combination of American and Armenian. They used clarinet and saxophone on the American side, but used the Armenian instruments oud, two dumbags, and a tambourine.

The group consisted of:

- Eddie Arvanigian
- Aram Manougian
- Arthur Melkonian
- Berge Minisian
- Tom Minisian
- Cory Tosoian
