= Izabella Arazova =

Armenian composer

Izabella Arazova (born 25 September 1936) is an Armenian composer.

== Biography ==
Izabella Konstantinovna Arazova (Arazian) was born in Rostov-na-Donu, Russia SFSR, Soviet Union. She studied music at Melikyan Music College from 1955 to 1958, composition with Orest Yevlakhov at the Leningrad Conservatory from 1961 to 1963, and composition with Edvard Mirzoyan at the Yerevan Conservatory from 1964 to 1967. After completing her studies, she taught orchestration, composition and harmony at the Pedagogical Institute in Yerevan until 1990. In 1967 she became a member of the Armenian Composers' Union.

Arazova's works have been performed in Armenia, Russia, Estonia, Ukraine, the United States, Japan, France and Switzerland. She has resided in Yerevan since 1942.

== Works ==
Selected works include:

- String Quartet no.1, 1965
- Polyphonic Choruses (S. Kaputikyan), 1966
- Concerto for Orchestra 1967
- 6 Allegories (V. Grigoryan), 1v, pf, 1969
- Elegy, vc, pf, 1969
- Triptych, symphony (Kaputikyan), chorus, orch, 1972
- 3 yaponskikh stikhotvoreniy (3 Japanese poems from the Middle Ages), 1v, pf, 1979
- 5 Retrospections, pf, 1983
- Sonata no.1, vc, 1983
- Sonata no.2, vc, pf, 1984
- Perpetuum mobile, vc, pf, 1985
- Sonata, pf 1985
- Sonata no.3 'Sonata-Mystery', vc, pf, 1987
- The World is Just a Dream (Japanese poems from the Middle Ages), 1v, pf, 1988
- Sonata, vn, pf 1991
- String Quartet no.2, 1991
- Quattro, 4 vc, 1995
- Prayer, orch, 1996
