= Grigor Yeghiazaryan =

Soviet Armenian composer (1908–1988)

- Գրիգոր Եղիազարյան
- Born: December 21, 1908; Blur, Erivan Governorate, Russian Empire
- Died: November 4, 1988 (aged 79); Yerevan, Armenian SSR
- Resting place: Central Cemetery Tokhmakh
- Other name: Grigory Yegiazaryan

Grigor Yeghiazaryan (Armenian: Գրիգոր Եղիազարյան), also known as Grigory Ilyich (Yegiayevich) Yegiazaryan (Russian: Григорий Ильич (Егиаевич) Егиазарян; December 21, 1908 (Note: Old Style: December 8, 1908) − November 4, 1988), was a Soviet Armenian composer. After a childhood spent amidst the Armenian genocide, Yeghiazaryan joined the Red Army in 1921, playing in regimental bands until 1929. He enrolled in the Moscow Conservatory in 1930, where his teachers included Reinhold Glière and Nikolai Myaskovsky. Upon graduation, he taught and lectured in the Armenian SSR; first in Leninakan, then Yerevan. As composer, teacher, and functionary, he established himself as a crucial figure in Armenian musical culture of the mid-20th century.

== Biography ==
=== Early life ===
Yeghiazaryan was born to an Armenian peasant family in the village of Blur, Erivan Governorate, Russian Empire (today Enginalan, Iğdır Province, Turkey), on December 21, 1908. His family fled to Yerevan in 1918 as a result of the Armenian Genocide, in the course of which two of his brothers and three of his sisters died from starvation. While on an expedition foraging for food, he heard the sound of a nearby military band in a regiment of the 11th Red Army. When the bandmaster saw the sight of the young Yeghiazaryan, he took pity and offered him a position, which he accepted. The income and rations he earned as a member of the regiment saved him from the deprivation that had killed his siblings. As a result, he considered the arrival in Armenia of the Red Army in 1920 the formative event of his life. "For the first time, after the privations and misfortunes endured by the Armenian people, there was hope for salvation and we could finally live in peace", he told an interviewer for Soviet Music in 1984.

=== Student years ===
Yeghiazaryan joined the Red Army in 1921, whereupon he was stationed in Tiflis, Georgian SSR. There he befriended another regimental musician, Konstantin Ivanov. Together they traveled to Moscow to pursue music studies and join another band. Yeghiazaryan remained in the Red Army until 1929. Composition was not an interest for him until 1930, when he transferred from a music academy to the Moscow Conservatory. There he first came under the tutelage of Reinhold Glière; his classmates included Tikhon Khrennikov and Nikolai Budashkin. Glière encouraged Yeghiazaryan to develop himself away from imitation of Alexander Scriabin and, instead, turn to Armenian folklore. This direction was buoyed by his subsequent composition teacher, Nikolai Myaskovsky, as well as his assistants, Vissarion Shebalin and Nikolai Chemberdzhi.

On the occasions when Myaskovsky was too ill to teach, he was substituted by Sergei Prokofiev. It was during one of these classes that Yeghiazaryan presented his "Dance" for violin and piano to Prokofiev. Although he praised its melodies, he suggested to Yeghiazaryan that he discontinue further work on the score in order to allow himself to mature artistically. This comment led to a creative crisis, which coincided with ongoing debates as to how to develop the emerging music from the non-Russian Soviet republics. It also led to numerous reworkings of "Dance", which culminated in a final version entitled Concert-Poem for violin and orchestra that was composed in 1981 for Ruben Aharonyan. Another incident occurred during an open audition of new works by conservatory students, during which Yeghiazaryan was harshly criticized for his perceived modernism by the rector, Bolesław Przybyszewski. Yeghiazaryan viewed the matter humorously in retrospect, but at the time he recalled that he was not able to sleep for fear that he would be expelled from the conservatory.

=== Maturity ===
After graduating from the Moscow Conservatory in 1935, Yeghiazaryan moved to Leninakan in the Armenian SSR, where he taught and lectured at the Leninakan State Music College. He accepted an invitation from the Yerevan Conservatory in 1938 to join its faculty. He succeeded Khristofor Kushnaryov and Vardges Talyan in the composition department.

In 1944, Yeghiazaryan's symphonic poem Armenia was performed at the Festival of Music of the Transcaucasian Republics in Tbilisi, where it was considered the highlight work. Between 1954 and 1960, Yeghiazaryan was the rector of the Yerevan Conservatory. Altogether, he taught at the institution for 35 years. Among his students were Alexander Achemyan, Emin Aristakesyan, Gevorg Armenyan, Edvard Baghdasaryan, Geghuni Chitchyan, Edgar Hovhannisyan, and Eduard Khaghagortyan. As composer, teacher, and functionary, Yeghiazaryan was an influential figure in Armenian musical culture.

In addition to his teaching duties, Yeghiazaryan also served as chairman of the Armenian SSR Union of Composers from 1952 to 1955. The musicologist Izabella Yeolyan speculated that Yeghiazaryan's bureaucratic work may have been one of the reasons for his limited compositional output. Although his music was well known within the Armenian SSR, it was rarely performed elsewhere in the Soviet Union.

=== Death ===
Yeghiazaryan died on November 4, 1988, in Yerevan.

== Legacy ==
Upon his death, many of Yeghiazaryan's manuscripts were dispersed among various institutions and individuals. Their state of preservation has generally been poor. In 2018, the Armenian State Symphony Orchestra retrieved and digitized a number of manuscripts, which they performed that year at a festival dedicated to the composer's music and legacy.

== Musical style ==
From early in his career, Yeghiazaryan prioritized composing orchestral music which depicted aspects of Armenian life and culture. His brilliantly orchestrated music is often based on the songs of Komitas and Armenian folk music, such as the sari. Yeolyan considered Yeghiazaryan to be a successor to Komitas. His major achievement is considered to be the advancement of Armenian orchestral music. With its use of variation and programmatic elements, his music continues the traditions of Alexander Spendiaryan.

He acknowledged the importance in his music of folk melodies, but warned that composers cannot allow their own characters to be subsumed by them. He cited the contrasting examples of Mikhail Glinka and Sergei Prokofiev as two composers who found inspiration in folk music, while retaining their individuality.

Yeghiazaryan was appreciative of modernism and the need to seek new ideas, he told Soviet Music, though he was critical of polystylism; a technique that he said reduced a composer to dependency on their source material.

== Works ==
Yeghiazaryan's works include:

- Sazandar, for piano (1935)
- In Memory of Komitas, for piano (1936)
- Rhapsody, for orchestra (1939)
- Armenia, symphonic poem (1942)
- Violin Concerto (1943)
- Ballet Fragments, for orchestra (1946)
- Suite on Themes by Komitas, for orchestra (1948)
- To the Sunrise, for orchestra (1952)
- Sevan, ballet (1958)
- Hrazdan (based on a poem by Hovhannes Shiraz), symphony (1960)
- Preludes, for piano (1962, 1968)
- The Lake of Dreams, ballet (1968)
- Ara the Handsome and Semiramis, ballet (1982)

== Awards ==
- People's Artist of the Armenian SSR (1961)
- State Prize of the Armenian SSR (1971)
- People's Artist of the USSR (1977)
