= Yeghia Dndesian =

Armenian musician and musical reformer

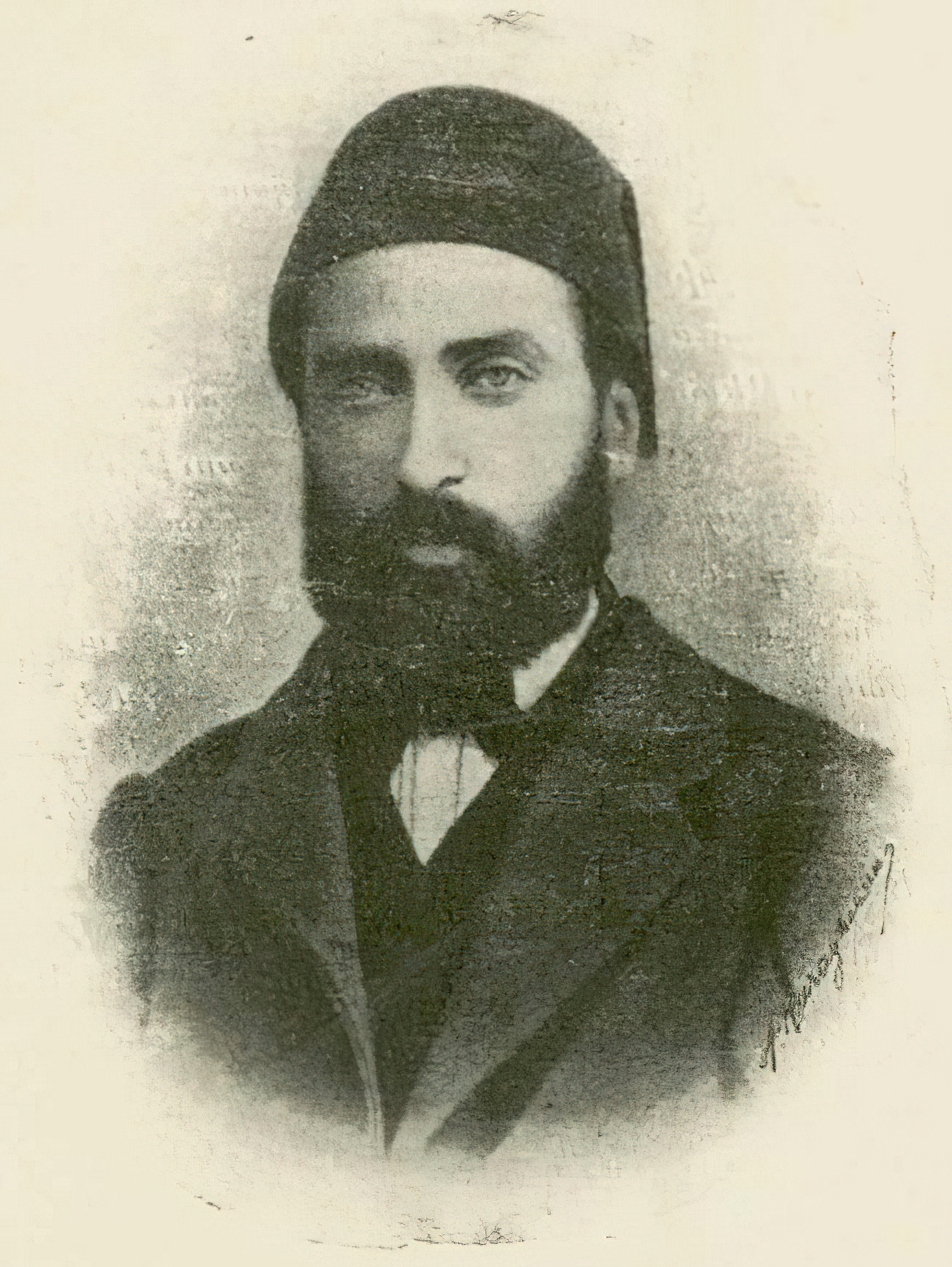

Yeghia Dndesian (born Istanbul, Ottoman Turkey 1834 - died Constantinople, Ottoman Turkey 1881) was an Armenian musician and musical reformer.

== Work ==
Yeghia Dndesian was among the cultivators of the Sharagan musical style and notation used throughout Armenian churches and religious services. He was instrumental in resurfacing much of the lost information of ancient Armenian music. In April 1873, a committee consisting of priests, clergymen, and scribes arrived in Constantinople to gather, revise, or recompose Sharagan melodies in order to preserve them for notation. Dndesian was chosen as a member of the committee along with Nigoghos Tashjian, and Aristakes Hovannesian (1812-1878). After putting much work, Dndesian eventually published a five volume book in 1871 entitled Sharagan Tzainakryal or Sharagan Notations.
