= Levon Chaushian =

Soviet and Armenian composer (1946–2022)

Levon Alexandri Chaushian (also transliterated Chaushyan; Armenian: Լևոն Ալեքսանդրի Չաուշյան, Russian: Левон Александрович Чаушян, 10 May 1946 – 17 February 2022) was a Soviet and Armenian composer.

== Life and career ==
He was born in 1946 in Yerevan. In 1969 he graduated from the Yerevan Komitas State Conservatory, majoring in composition in the class of Edvard Mirzoyan. In 1970 he studied piano with Georgi Sarajev. In 1972 he graduated from the post-graduate studies.

He participated in many music festivals and got numerous diplomas. In 1988 his string quartet N 3 performed at the International Festival in Leningrad.

From 1986 to 1991 he was the vice-president of the Armenian Composers' Union. Since 1994, he has served as the chairman of the Armenian Composers Assembly, established by him.

His works were performed in the US, Belgium, France, Switzerland, Hungary, Portugal, Bulgaria, Greece.

Chaushian died on February 17, 2022, at the age of 75.
