= Adam Khudoyan =

Armenian composer (1921–2000)

Adam Geghami Khudoyan
- Born: 21 February 1921; Yerevan, Armenia
- Died: 2000 (aged 78–79); Yerevan, Armenia
- Known for: Composer

Adam Geghami Khudoyan (Russian: Адам Худоян, 21 February 1921, Yerevan, Armenia - 2000, Yerevan) was an Armenian composer, awarded by the Renowned Activist of the Arts of Armenia official title.

He finished the Yerevan State Conservatory in 1945. He directed the Composer's House of Armenia, was the secretary of the Composer's Union of Armenia. Khudoyan composed three cello sonatas, cello duo sonata and cello nostalgia. In 1961 he wrote "Sonata for Cello Solo No. 1".

Şahan Arzruni wrote: "I personally find strong parallels between Khudoyan's approach to music and that of Mussorgsky. Like Mussorgsky, Khudoyan employed chordal progressions that are unusual, unbounded, even unacceptable to the traditional rules of harmony.
