= Kristapor Kara-Murza =

Armenian composer (1853–1902)

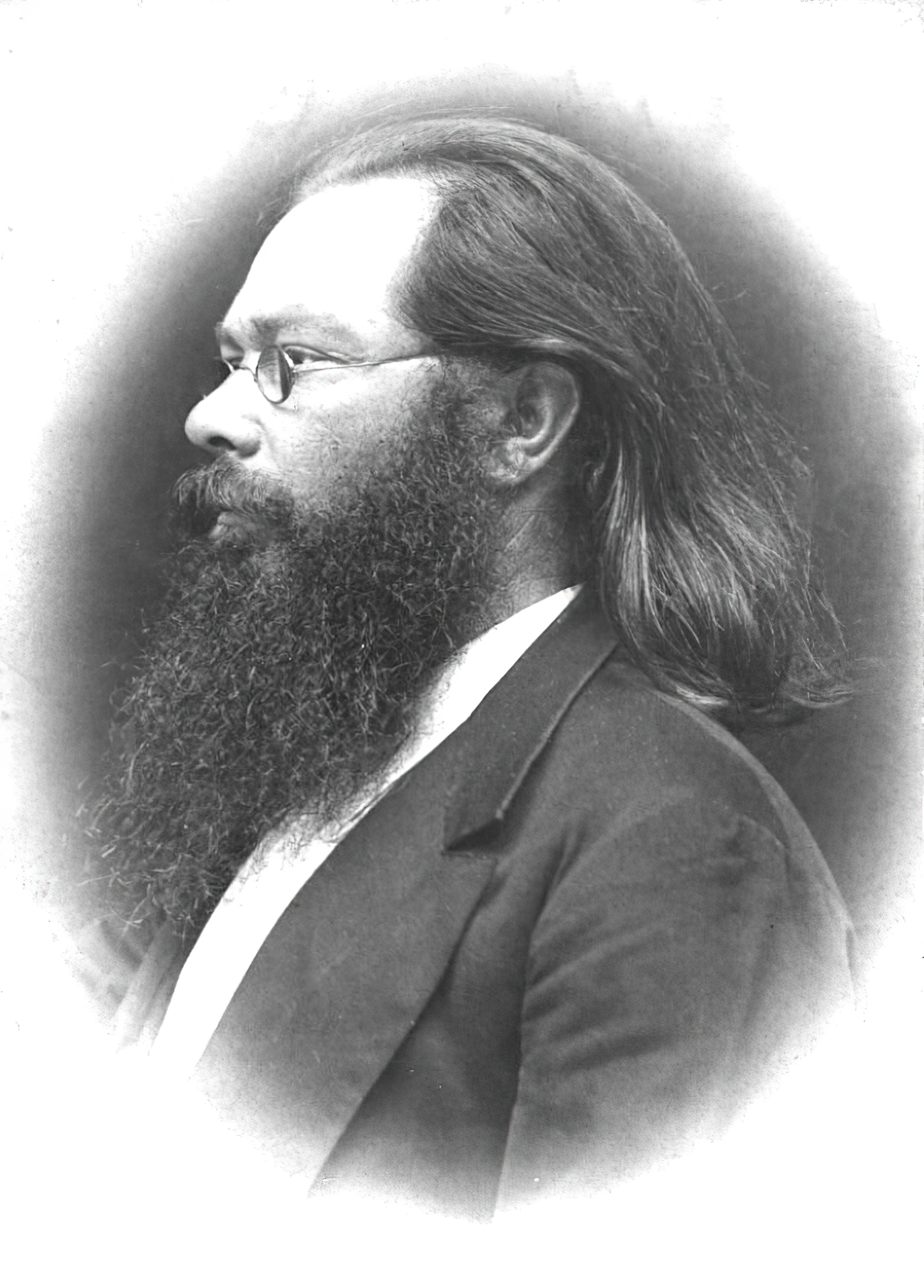
Kristapor Kara-Murza

Kristapor Kara-Murza (sometimes also anglicized Christopher, birth name Khachatur; 1853–1902; Armenian: Քրիստափոր Կարա-Մուրզա) was an Armenian composer.
