= Gayane Chebotaryan =

Armenian composer and musicologist

Gayane Chebotaryan (8 November 1918, Rostov-on-Don–16 January 1998, Moscow) was an Armenian composer and musicologist. She was born in Rostov-on-Don, Russia, and graduated from the Leningrad Conservatory. She studied composition with Christopher Kushnaryan and piano with Moisei Khalfin. In 1947 she took a teaching position with the Yerevan Komitas State Conservatory where she was appointed professor in 1977. She was made an Honored Art Worker of the Armenian SSR in 1965, and published a work on the polyphonic characteristics of Aram Khachaturian in 1969.

As a composer, she was praised, along with other Armenian composers, by Dmitri Shostakovich for "working hard and successfully on new compositions."

== Works ==
Selected works include:

- Piano Concerto
- Piano Trio
- Suite, for orchestra No. 2
- Six Preludes
- Polifonicheskii al'bom dlia iunoshestva. 13 fortepiannykh p'es collection, 1975

Her work has been recorded and issued on CD, including:

- Armenian Piano Trios, Audio CD (September 20, 2004) Et'Cetera, ASIN: B0006Z2LEC
