= Artur Avanesov =

Armenian composer

- Born: December 9, 1980 (age 45); Armenia
- Occupations: Composer, pianist
- Era: Contemporary

Artur Avanesov (Armenian: Արթուր Ավանեսով, Russian: Артур Аванесов, born December 9, 1980, in Moscow, Russia) is an Armenian composer of chamber, choral, vocal, and piano works that have been performed in Armenia and abroad.

== Career ==
Avanesov studied piano at various music schools in Baku, Kapan and Yerevan as a child, and studied music theory at the Alexander Spendiaryan Specialised Music School in Yerevan from 1994 to 1997. He studied composition with Stepan Rostomyan and piano with Elena Abajyan at the Komitas State Conservatory of Yerevan from 2000 to 2002 and earned his doctorate in musicology in 2005.

As a pianist, he has performed with musicians such as Rohan de Saram, Kim Kashkashian, Anja Lechner, Tony Arnold, and many others. His compositions have been performed in many countries including Europe, CIS countries, United States, Japan, Taiwan, Canada, Brazil, and the Middle East.

Among his honours are co-First Prize in the Benjamin Britten competition in Yerevan (2003, for Namu-Amida-Butsu) and co-First Prize in the Ghazaros Saryan competition for vocal music in Yerevan (2004, for Garun a – Spring).

Avanesov has taught composition at the Komitas State Conservatory of Yerevan since 2005.

His writings have appeared in many journals in Armenia and he has served as co-editor of the magazine Musical Armenia since 2002, where he has published articles on the music of Stockhausen and several contemporary Armenian composers. He is also the co-founder of the AUS Contemporary Music Ensemble (formed in 2001), which performs works of young and established composers from Armenia and abroad.

== Major works ==
=== Chamber music ===
- Four Pieces, string quartet, 1996
- Namu-Amida-Butsu, flute, piano, 2001
- ...dies ist ein lied für dich allein... (cellist also sings text by Stefan George; performer must be male), cello, 2003
- webcrossings.ch-am, flute, oboe, bass clarinet, 2004
- ...leise..., clarinet, piano, 2004

=== Choral ===
- Et resurrexit, 12 mixed voices, 1999
- Kyrie eleison, male chorus, 2000
- Christe eleison, soprano, male chorus, 2001
- Te decet hymnus, mixed chorus, 2001
- Requiem æternam, tenor, mixed chorus, 2 flutes ad libitum, 2 oboes ad libitum, piano, timpani, 42 strings, 2002
- Kyrie II, male chorus, 2002
- Lungi da te cor mio (text by Luzzasco Luzzaschi), mixed chorus, 2004
- Miserere, mixed chorus, 2007

=== Vocal ===
- Cinq Haïkaï (texts by Matsuo Bashō, Rinka Ono [Armenian translations]), female voice, piano, 1996
- Two Gazelles of Yeghishe Charents, female voice, flute, oboe, French horn, violin, cello, piano, 2 percussion, 1997
- ...and the moon is like shadow under your feet... (text by Vardan Areveltsi), female voice, piano, 1998 (also version for female voice, 1998)
- Les douze couleurs d'Alleluja, alto, 2002
- ...i have tried to write paradise... (text by Ezra Pound), mezzo-soprano/countertenor, string quartet, 2003
- Garun a (text from a folksong from Armenia), mezzo-soprano, piano, 2003
- Wieder (text by Rose Ausländer), male voice, piano, 2005
- Im Luys – My Light (text from a folk source from Armenia), soprano, violin, 2005
- A Handful of Fire (text from a folksong from Armenia), soprano, piano, 2006
- ...zij lijkt op een vreemde bloem... (text by Krikor Momdjian; pianist also sings and must be male), mezzo-soprano, cello, piano, 2007

=== Piano ===
- Three Preludes, 1996
- Ave Sancta, 1997
- In memoriam T. Takemitsu, 1998
- Et in sæcula sæculorum, 2 pianos, 1999
- Un peu de musique pour S., 2000
- Illa, 1999–2001
- Deux Énigmes, 2002
- Malinconia in fis, 2005
- No lloro, 2005
- Feux follets (cycle), 2007–

=== Harpsichord ===
- Fenstern zu G-dur, 2002
- Musique triste, 2002

=== Film score ===
- Words, Words, Words, 2005 (Raffie Davidian)
