= Vache Sharafyan =

Armenian composer

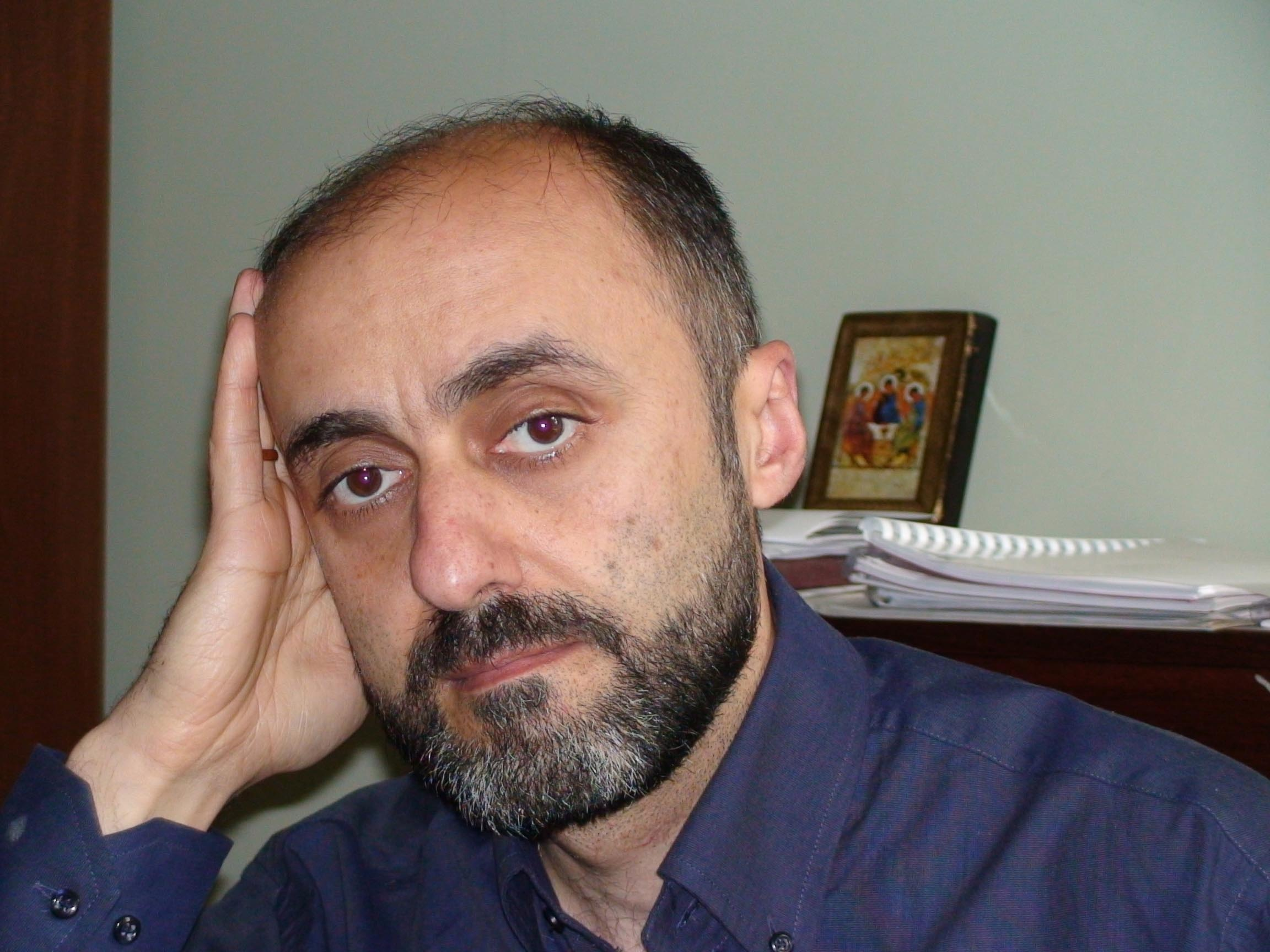
- Born: February 11, 1966

Vache Sharafyan (Armenian: Վաչե Շարաֆյան), (born February 11, 1966, in Yerevan, Armenia) is an Armenian composer of symphonic works, chamber music, choral music and opera. His works include 2 acts opera King Abgar, ballet Second Moon, 2 acts ballet Ancient Gods, one act ballet “the bride of the desert”.

His works have been commissioned or performed by Yo-Yo Ma and "Silk Road Ensemble", Yuri Bashmet and The Ensemble "Soloists of Moscow", The Hilliard Ensemble, Boston Modern Orchestra Project, Dresden Symphony Orchestra, Rostok Philharmonic, The Metropolitan Museum of Art (2018), Soli Deo Gloria Psalm project, Jacaranda on the Edge fest, Estonian National Male Choir, Hover State Chamber Choir, and the Apricus Trio.

== Critical reception ==
The New York Times called his work Adumbrations of the Peacock "a stark, mysterious and ultimately majestic concatenation of broken-bell piano chords, tremulous melodies and quivering textures.".

The Boston Globe said of the commissioned work Sinfonia No. 2 un poco concertante, that it was "complex, deliberate, ultimately captivating".

The Chicago Tribune said of his work for the Silk Road Ensemble that "The seamless evolution of moods and textures—from soft, somber lines made up of pained intervals, to more violent outbursts, back to mournful lines—made it entirely absorbing to the ear and mind."
