= Paghtasar Dpir =

Armenian musician, writer, artist and scientist

Paghtasar Dpir, or Baghdasar Tbir (Armenian: Պաղտասար Դպիր, 7 June 1683 – 1768) was an Armenian poet, musician, scientist, printer, and a luminary of national and educational movements. He is considered a leading figure during the revitalization period of Armenian culture.

== Biography ==
Paghtasar Dpir was born in Istanbul in 1683 to parents who had recently migrated from Kayseri. He was educated in local schools and continued his studies with Bishop Astvatsatur Jughayetsi, Legate of the Armenian Catholicos of Etchmiadzin. In 1741, Paghtasar Dpir was appointed headmaster of the secular school of the Armenian Patriarchate in Kumkapu. Many of his students become leading personalities, such as Simeon I of Yerevan, Catholicos of Etchmiadzin, and the poet Petros Ghapantsi.

== Linguistic contributions ==
Paghtasar Dpir occupies an important position among cultural figures of the late Middle Ages, who believed that Classical Armenian (grabar) must be revitalized and applied as a literary language. They wanted to tie the new literature with the old through the active application of classical Armenian, aspiring to tap into the rich cultural heritage of the Middle Ages. They strove to make Classical Armenian more accessible to the masses through their work without submitting to the vernacular.

In his vernacular writings, Paghtasar Dpir uses the dialect of Istanbul, which, like other Armenian dialects of the time, often loaned words from foreign languages and especially from Turkish.

== Lyric poetry ==
Paghtasar Dpir has made an appreciable contribution to the development of modern Armenian poetry. The themes and temperament of his works is, in general, traditional, yet he frequently infuses ideas of freedom and liberalism. He writes not only about love, as troubadours of his time, but also about social, religious and moral issues. The refinement of his language does not constrain his expressions, but allows him to be honest and passionate.

Researchers of Paghtasar Dpir's works point to the uniqueness of the poem entitled "To Mamona" compared to songs written during that period. Here Paghtasar Dpir exposes the demon's destructive influence of wealth and greed on man. He writes about Mamona from a popular moralistic point of view to repudiate its influence.

Another one of Paghtasar Dpir's well-known songs is "I nnjmaned arkayakan zartir" (Awaken from your royal slumber, 1707), in which he infuses musical themes from modern troubadour and ancient liturgical music. Although it appears to be a love song, it could also be interpreted allegorically as a call to the Armenian nation to awaken from its stupor and to resist foreign rule.

Paghtasar Dpir's musical creativity is clearly influenced by traditional troubadour, religious, as well as contemporary eastern and minstrel music. For his secular and especially for his love songs, he benefits extensively from Armenian national traditional and eastern melodies.

Among his most valuable and important contributions to Armenian lyrical heritage is a series called Taghikner siro yev karotanats (Little Songs of Love and Yearning). His songbook entitled Tagharan pokrik Paghtasar Dpri (Little songbook of Paghtasar Dpir, 1723) was reprinted seven times with additions and revisions.

Paghtasar Dpir has also written Turkish language poems using Armenian letters.

== Educational work ==
In 1741 Paghtasar Dpir was appointed head of the secular school of the Armenian Patriarchate in Kumkapu by Patriarch Hagop Nalian. The school blossomed during his tenure. For many years, Paghtasar Dpir taught Armenian language, grammar, music and other topics. Between 1736 and 1760 he compiled and published a series of textbooks for the instruction of classical and vernacular Armenian language, which remained in use for nearly a century afterwards.

Paghtasar Dpir's most important educational works are Parzabanutiun kerakanutian karcharot yev diurimats (An explanation of grammar, concise and easy to understand, 2 vols., 1736), a grammar of classical Armenian written in that language; Girk kerakanutian (A grammar book, 1760), a grammar of classical Armenian written in vernacular Armenian; Hamarot meknabanutiun tramabanutian (A concise commentary on logic, 1822); Zhamanakagrutiun (Chronology, 1951); and Hamarotutiun patmutian Movses Khorenatsvo (Summary of Movses Khorenatsi's History, unpublished).

== Contributions to printing ==
In the eighteenth century, printing in Istanbul plays an appreciable role in spreading Armenian culture. In the years spanning from 1720 to 1760, Paghtasar Dpir contributes to literary and printing activities. He assembles a series of scientific, comparative armenological works and prepares editorials for historical, philosophical and theological books. He works with publishers such as Astvadzatur Dpir and his successors.

Many Armenian classical historical literary works are published under his supervision, many of them for the first time. Among those are Zenob Glak's Girk patmutian yerkrin tarono (History book of the land of Taron, 1719) and Girk vor kochi harants vark (Book that is called the life or our fathers, 1720), Arakel Siunetsi's Adamagirk (The book of Adam, 1721), Simeon Jughayetsi's Girk tramabanutian (Book of logic, 1728), Grigor Narekatsi's Matian voghbergutian (Book of Sorrow, 1726), Grigor Tatevatsi's Girk hartsmants (Book of Questions, 1729) and Davit Anhaght's Girk sahmanats (Book of definitions, 1731).
