= Sergei Aslamazyan =

Armenian musician (1897–1978)

Sergei Aslamazyan Սերգեյ Ասլամազյան
- Born: 27 January 1897 [O.S. 15 January] Mozdok, Caucasus Viceroyalty, Russian Empire
- Died: September 28, 1976 (aged 79) Moscow, Russian SFSR, Soviet Union
- Genre: Classical
- Occupations: Cellist; Composer
- Instrument: Cello

Sergei Zakari Aslamazyan (Note: Armenian: Սերգեյ Զաքարի Ասլամազյան, romanized: Sergey Zakʻari Aslamazyan; Russian: Сергей Захарович Асламазян, romanized: Sergey Zakharovich Aslamazyan; Sometimes given as Aslamazian) (27 January 1897 [O.S. 15 January] – 27 September 1978) was a Soviet Armenian cellist, composer, People's Artist of Armenian SSR (1945), awarded the Stalin Prize (1946). He was a co-founder and a member of Komitas Quartet from 1925 to 1968. He was the author of quartet versions of Komitas works. From 1947 he was a professor at Moscow State Conservatory.

== Selected works ==
- Melodie for viola and piano
- Suite on Armenian Folk Songs for string quartet (1950)
- Variations on a Theme by Paganini for string quartet (1961)
