= Nicol Galanderian =

Nicol Galanderian

Nicol Galanderian (Armenian: Նիկոլ Գասպարի Գալանդերյան (Note: Classical spelling: Նիկոլ Գասպար Գալանդէրեան); also Nikol Kalanderian; September 7, 1881 – March 2, 1944) was a noted composer of Armenian music known for vocal, choral and children's works with a compositional basis of folk music and urban folksong.

== Life and career ==
Born 7 September 1881 in Akn, historical Armenia – present-day Kemaliye, Turkey – to a shoemaker's family, Nicol Galanderian lost most of his family in the Turkish massacres of 1894-96. Galanderian, his mother Eva and a brother survived and settled in Eastern Armenia.

In 1900 Galanderian began studies under the noted Armenian composer Komitas Vardapet at the Gevorgian Seminary. He studied with Komitas for two years, becoming familiar with Armenian church music and the Armenian notational system. Afterwards, Galanderian studied the violin and guitar on his own and continued to explore music theory. In 1910, he accepted a teaching position in Tiflis, Georgia, and in 1911 began his composing career with his first composition based on a text of Avetik Isahakyan Yerger ou verker ("Songs and Wounds"). With the recognition of his work came an invitation to teach at the Haykazian School (now Davtian School) in Tehran, Iran, where he lived and composed the rest of this life. In Tehran, he organized and conducted the "Goghtan" choir, an Armenian choir that performed many of his works.

In 1913 he wrote a children's opera and, beginning in 1924, many other compositions for children. Many of his works draw upon Armenian poetry and writings. His works draw upon the poetry of Vahan Terian, Hovhannes Toumanian, Avetik Isahakyan and others. His work includes the operas Parvana (a lake in Georgia), Hovik ("Breeze") and Lalvari vors ("Lalvar's Prey"). His compositions and manuscripts are in the archives of the State Museum of Art and Literature in Yerevan, Armenia.

Galanderian continued his career until his death on 2 March 1944, in Tehran.
