= Edvard Baghdasaryan =

Armenian composer (1922–1987)

Edvard Baghdarsaryan (Armenian: Էդուարդ Բաղդասարյան), also spelled as Eduard Baghdasarian (14 November 1922 – 5 November 1987) was an Armenian composer born in Yerevan. He was named an Honored Art Worker of the Armenian SSR in 1963. Baghdasaryan graduated from the Yerevan State Conservatory where he double majored both in piano with Sarajev and in composition with Yeghiazaryan. He did his graduate work in Moscow during 1951–1953. He initially joined the composition faculty of Romanos Melikian Music School and later became a member of the Conservatory. Among his works are Symphonic Poem (1950), Sonata for clarinet and piano (1952), Overture (1953, for symphonic orchestra), Rhapsody for violin and orchestra (1958), 24 Preludes for piano, Շախմատ (Chess, 1960, ballet), Piano Concerto, romances, choral works, incidental music and movie scores. He died on 5 November 1987 in Yerevan.
