= Nikoghayos Tigranian =

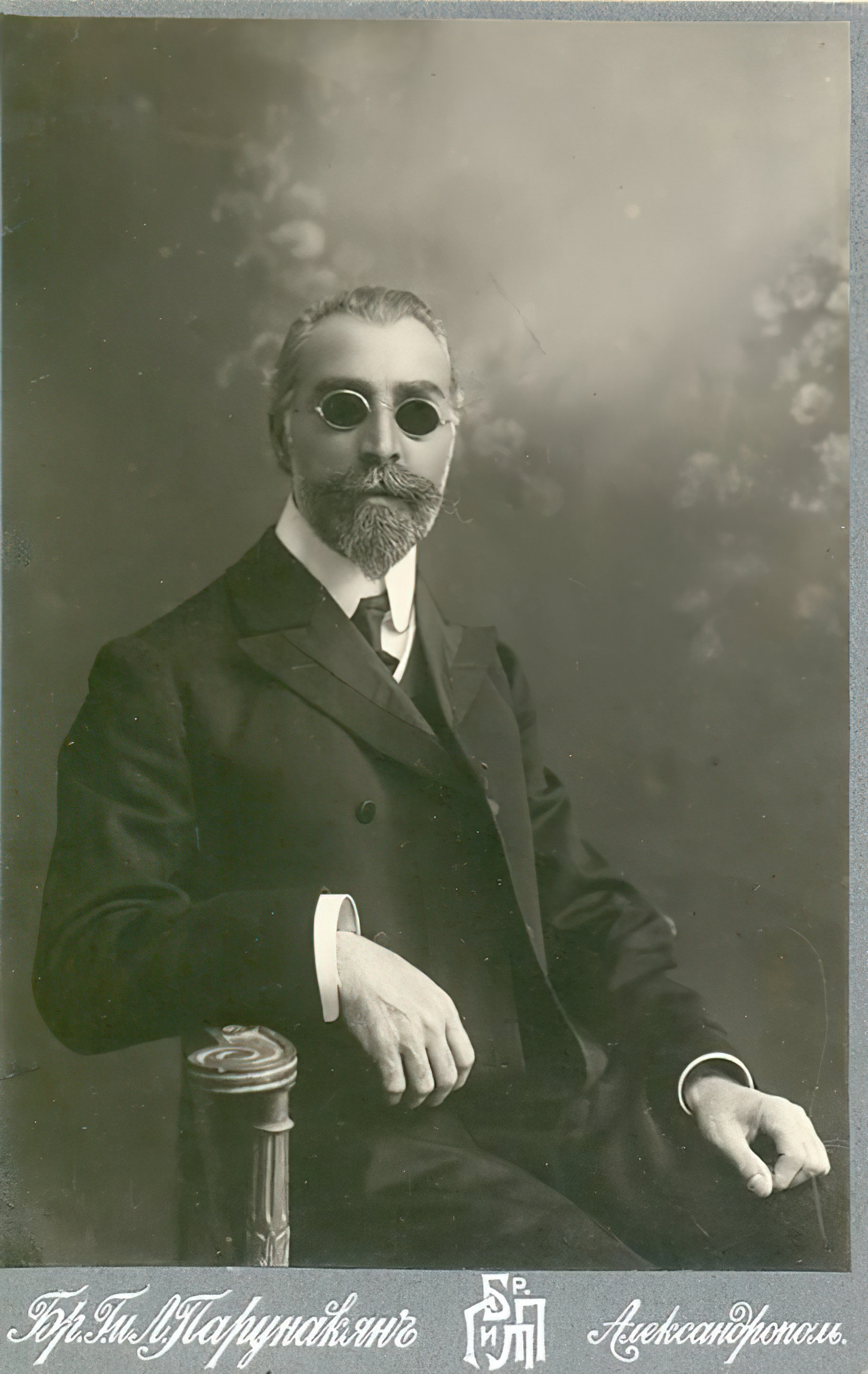

Background information
- Born: Nikoghayos Tigranian; 31 August 1856; Alexandropol
- Died: 17 February 1951 Yerevan
- Genres: Classical music
- Occupations: Composer, pianist, musicologist

Nikoghayos Tigranian (Armenian: Նիկողայոս Թադեւոսի Տիգրանյան; 31 August 1856 in Alexandropol – 17 February 1951 in Yerevan) was an Armenian composer, pianist, musicologist, and sociocultural activist. He introduced the Braille System to Armenia.

== Biography ==
Nikoghayos Tigranian was born in Alexandropol in the Russian Empire (present-day Gyumri, Armenia) to a prominent family. His younger brother Sirakan Tigranian was the foreign minister of the First Republic of Armenia. Hovsep and Ghazar Tigranian, also his brothers, were trustees of Nersisian School.

Nikoghayos lost his sight at the age of 9 as a result of smallpox. His family sent him to Vienna in 1873 to study at the Imperial Royal Institute for the Education of the Blind (1873–1880). He also took piano lessons from Professor Schenner of the Vienna Conservatory (now named University of Music and Performing Arts).

He returned to his homeland in 1880. He gave piano recitals and delivered lectures in Western Europe, Russia and Transcaucasia, and published several articles on Oriental music. In 1893, Tigranian studied composition at the St. Petersburg Conservatory with Rimsky-Korsakov and N.F. Solovyov.

== Music ==
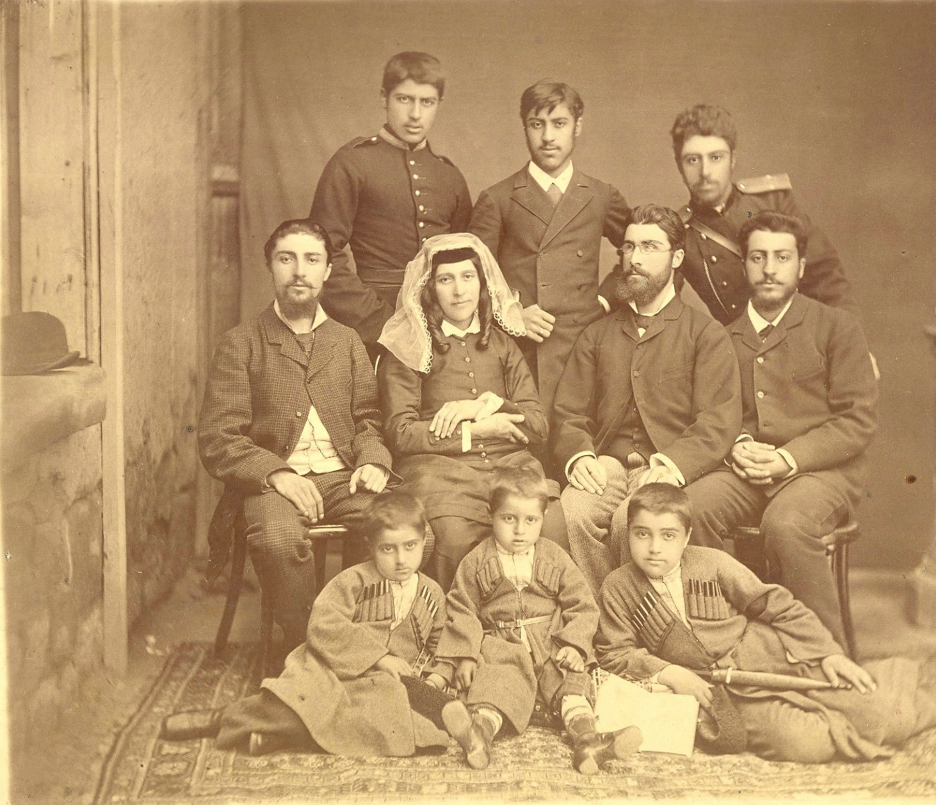
Tigranian family. Second row, second from the right is Nikoghayos.

He collected folk music, particularly mughams, which he used in original works and in various arrangements. He was awarded a bronze medal at the 1900 Paris International Festival as a “pioneer in collecting and featuring Oriental melodies”. It was through his efforts that melodies sung at the turn of the previous century in Transcaucasia by Armenian, Persian and Kurdish peoples were preserved. A number of composers, including Alexander Spendiaryan, Aram Khachaturian, Mikhail Ippolitov-Ivanov, Reinhold Moritzevich Glière, Armen Tigranian, and Sargis Barkhudaryan, have utilized these melodies in their own compositions. Tigranian was the first composer to translate such music into orchestral terms.

In his compositions, Tigranian's motto was to always stay faithful to the spirit of the folk music, to communicate the timbre of folk instruments, and to retain the plasticity of folk dances. His approach became an example to other composers who expanded further Tigranian's ideas and tools.

In 1921, Nikoghayos Tigranian implemented the Braille System for the first time in Armenia at the Gyumri school he founded.

He moved to Yerevan in 1934 where he died in 1951. A collection of his articles, memoires and letters was published in 1981. A street in Yerevan and the Art School of Gyumri are named after him.

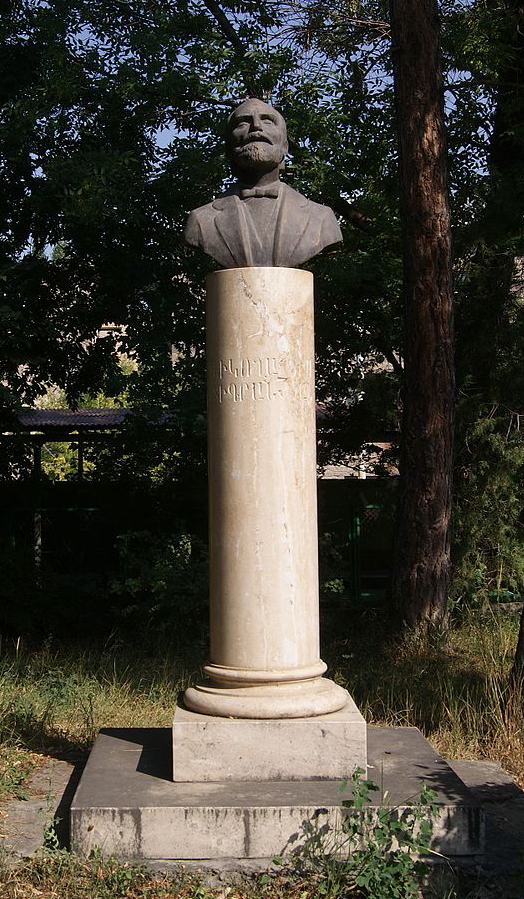
Nikoghayos Tigranyan's bust in Gyumri

== Awards ==
- People's Artist of the Armenian SSR (1933)
- Hero of Socialist Labour (1936)
- Order of the Red Banner of Labour (1939)

== Bibliography ==
- Ruzanna Mazmanyan. Nikoghayos Tigranyan: Ocherk Zhizni i Tvorchestva [Essay on Life and Creativity]. Yerevan: Sovetakan Grokh, 1978.
- Nikoghayos Tigranyan. Hodvatsner, husher, namakner, 1981
- NIKOLAY FADDEEVICH TIGRANOV Oriental Music, Leningrad 1927. Lonigradskiy Gublit e 36130, 31/2 nel. A. - Circulation 1000 The State Academic Printing House. VO, line 9. Book in Russian.
