= Koharik Gazarossian =

Armenian composer and pianist

Koharik Alis Gazarossian (Goharik Alis Łazarosian, Armenian: Գոհարիկ Ղազարոսեան) (21 December 1907 – 29 October 1967) was an Armenian composer and pianist. She was born in Constantinople (Istanbul) and entered the Paris Conservatory in 1926 where she studied with Paul Dukas and Lazare Lévy. After completing her studies, she performed as a concert pianist in Europe and worked as a composer. She died in Paris.

== Life ==
Koharik Alis Gazarossian was born on 21 December 1907 in Istanbul. was an Armenian composer and pianist. She studied the piano with Professor Hege as a child, and composing with Edgar Manas and Rudolph Leibovitch. She entered the Paris Conservatory in 1926, where she studied composition with Paul Dukas and Jean Roger-Ducasse, harmony with Paul Fauchet and piano with Lazare Lévy. Her first piano recital in Paris was in 1934, at the Salle Pleyel. After completing her studies, Gazarossian performed as a concert pianist in Europe and worked as a composer. Gazarossian selected 24 programmes of piano music by other composers, arranged by tonality, which she performed, called well-tempered recitals or 'bien tempere". She also composed 24 piano etudes, which were dedicated to individual people, including pianists Magdi Rufer and Idil Biret, and were completed in 1958. The etudes were praised by Aram Khachaturian.

Her piano music has been described as "gracious, immediate and well-balanced, written with a sense of keyboard flair".

Gazarossian died in Paris on 29 October 1967.

== Legacy ==
Her 24 piano etudes were recorded by pianist Nare Karoyan and released in December 2022. A lecture and concert dedicated to Gazarossian was held at UCLA.

== Works ==
Gazarossian composed piano, chamber and vocal works, and often incorporated liturgical or folk songs into her compositions. Selected works include:

- Sonata for piano
- Etude, no. 9
- Suite for piano
- Quartetto d'Archi
- Tre Canti Populari Armeni
- Preludes - Les Armeniannes

3 pieces for violin and piano:

- "O fille ta mere est morte" (O girl! Your mother is dead), a slow funeral moody piece announcing to the young lady that her mother died.
- "La lune de la nuit" (The moon at night)
- "O fille ton nom est Chuchan" ( O girl! Your name is Chouchan), a very vivid Armenian dance.
