= Grikor Suni =

Grikor Suni Mirzaian
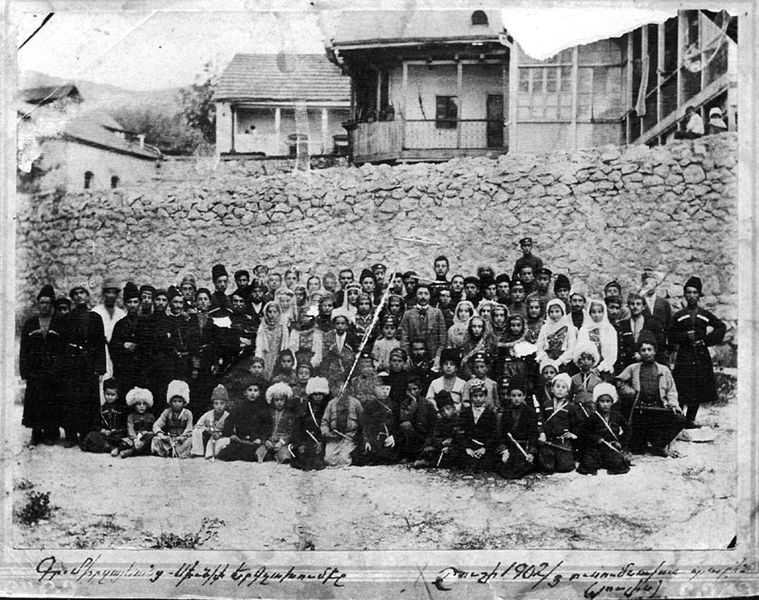
- Grikor Suni with his chorus at Shushi in 1902

Background information
- Born: Grikor Mirzaian; September 10, 1876; Getabek, Elisabethpol Governorate, Russian Empire
- Origin: Armenian
- Died: December 18, 1939 (aged 63) Philadelphia, Pennsylvania, United States
- Occupations: Composer, Choirmaster, Musicologist

Grikor Mirzaian Suni (Armenian: Գրիգոր Միրզայեան Սիւնի; originally Grikor Mirzaian, also Grigor; September 10, 1876 – December 18, 1939) was an Armenian composer and choirmaster.

In his hometown of Shushi, Suni became famous for his musical talents and organized his first concert. This would get him in trouble with Russian authorities forcing his chorus out of Shushi where they went on to spread Armenian cultural music around the world. Suni was an instrumental figure in establishing the national identity of Armenian music and considered one of the many founders of modern Armenian music.

== Biography ==
Grikor Suni came from a family of Armenian meliks (princes) from Syunik. He was the son of the singer and miniaturist Hovhannes Varandetsi and the grandson of the once famous ashug (folk singer) Melik Hovhannes Mirzabekyan. His great grandfather was Ashiq-Bashi (Chief Minstrel) at the court of Fath-Ali Shah. In 1883, he lost his father, who was killed falling from a horse. Suni spent much of his childhood in Shushi where he first started to study music. In Shushi, the future composer became acquainted with the Armenian musical notation system and theory. The young musician received wide recognition in the city and for his beautiful voice he was nicknamed Ghali Bulbul (Armenian: Ղալի Բյուլբուլ, lit. 'nightingale of the Fortress'). (Note: Armenians frequently called Shushi “Ղալի” (Ghali) meaning fortress in the Karabakh dialect.)

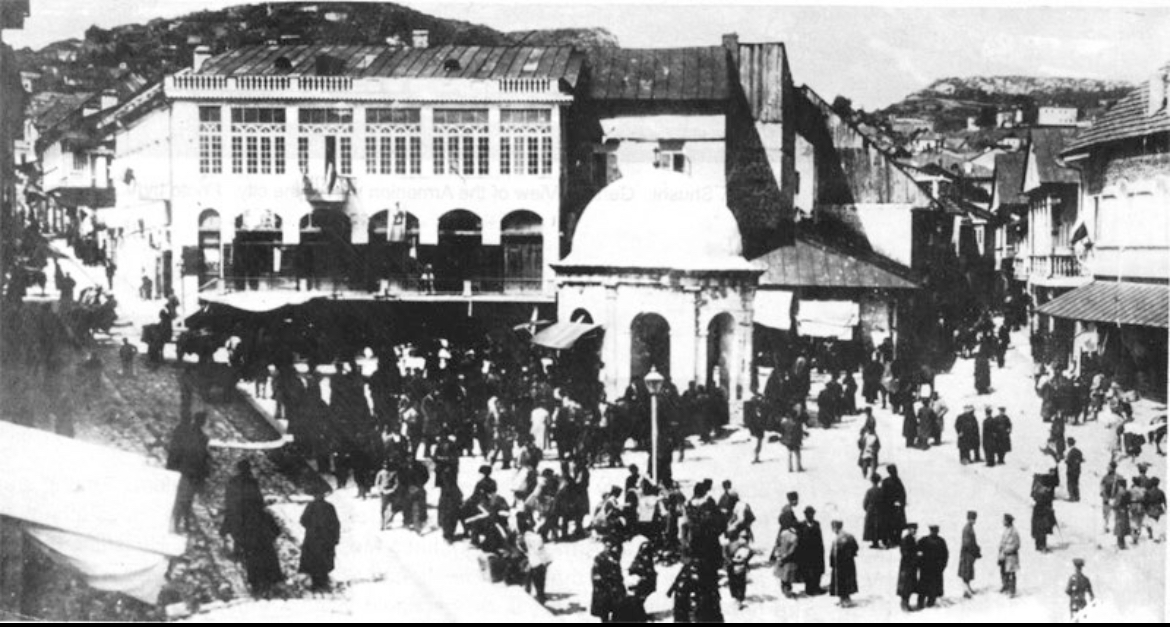
Khandamiryan theater in Shushi where Suni gave his first concert

Originating from a line of musicians, he studied music professionally from 1891 to 1895 at the Gevorgian Academy in Echmiadzin, near Yerevan, with Soghomon Soghomonian (later known as Komitas Vardapet), with whom he became friends and a long-time collaborator. Upon graduating in 1895, he established his choir in his hometown of Shushi. There in the regionally famous Armenian Khandamiryan theater, he gave his first concert with his chorus composed of folk songs he collected from the region. With the money he made from the concert, he moved to St. Petersburg, where he studied music from 1895 to 1904 with Nikolai Rimsky-Korsakov, Alexander Glazunov and Anatoly Lyadov. In St. Petersburg, he released his first collection of Armenian folk songs. In 1904, he moved to Tbilisi where he taught at the Nersisian School until 1908, gathering Armenian folk songs from Turkey and Iran. Suni briefly moved to Erzurum from 1910 to 1914 but returned to Tbilisi where he continued his activities as a composer and music instructor. "In October [1919] the founding of a national conservatory of music was entrusted to Grigor Mirzayan (Suny), and preparations were made for the Republic’s first art exhibit, featuring the works of thirty painters and sculptors, as the nucleus of a national gallery." Following this, he lived periodically in Tehran before returning back to Tbilisi in 1921.

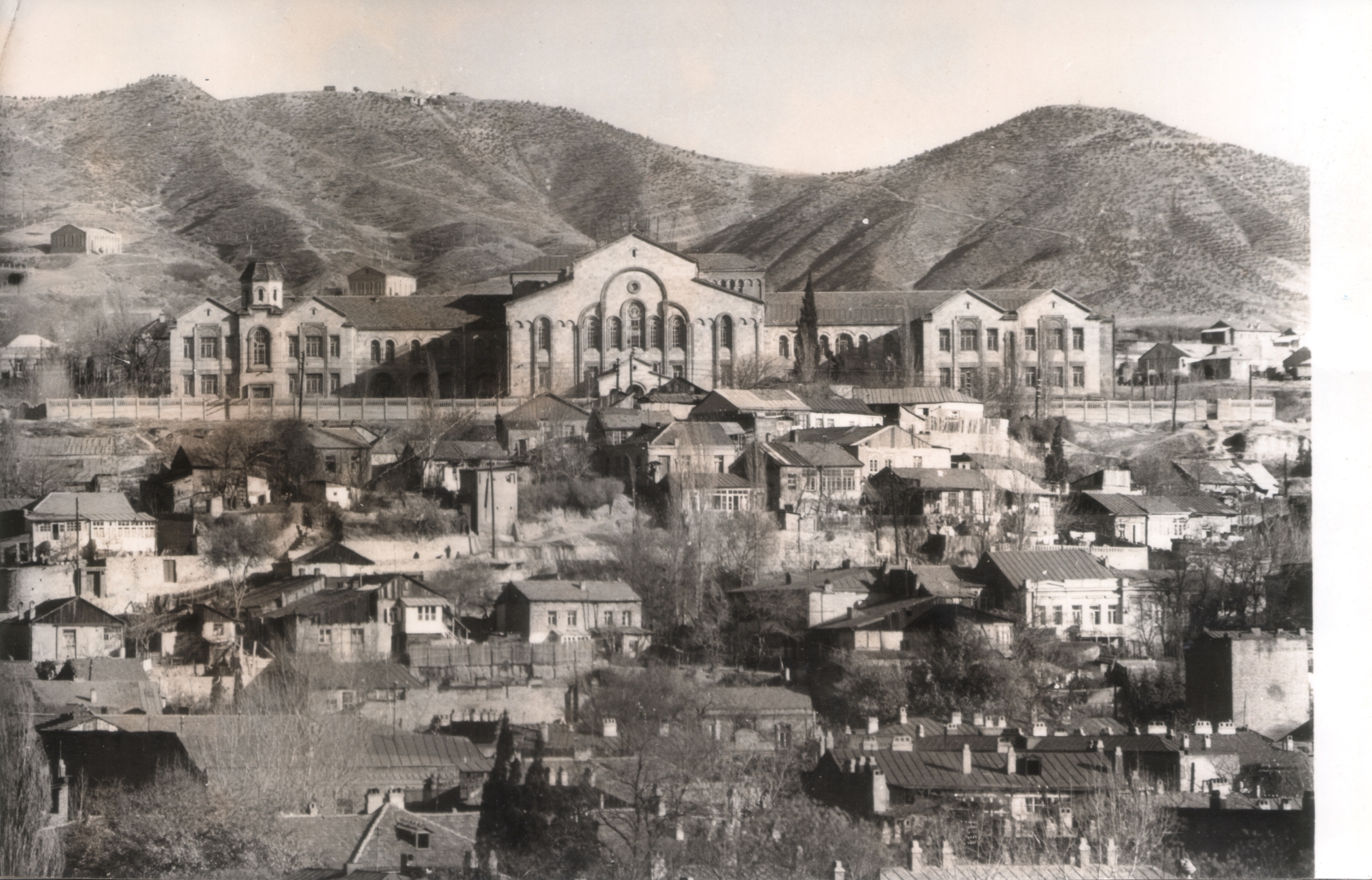
Nersisian school in Tbilisi where Suni was an instructor

Following the Sovietization of Armenia, Suni turned in his entire music library to the Soviet authorities and headed for Constaninople. There he taught at various local Armenian schools and established his own Armenian choir. However in 1923, following the growing Kemalist movement, he moved to the United States, arriving in New York in the fall of 2023 with his family. In 1925, he moved to Philadelphia, establishing a music studio dedicated to traditional Armenian music and continuing his career by judging international music competitions. He continued making music throughout the 1930s until his death in 1939, notably his pro-communist Nor Kyank’i Yergere (Songs of the New Life). Ronald Grigor Suny, Emeritus Professor of political science at the University of Chicago, is a grandson of Grikor Mirzaian Suni.

== Music and legacy ==
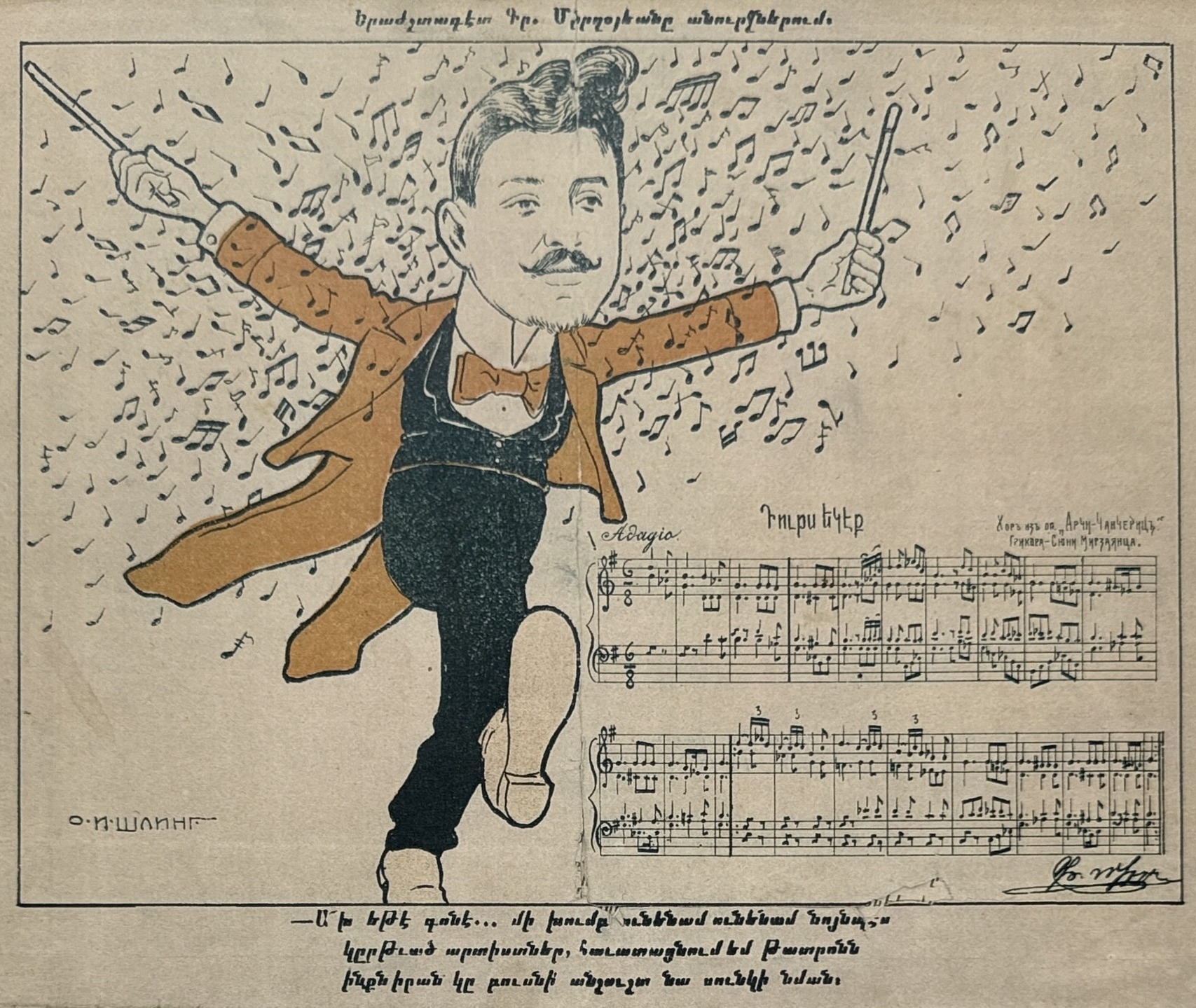
Cartoon of Grikor Suni published in Tbilisi-based Armenian satirical periodical Khatabala

The work of Grikor Suni developed in two directions of Armenian music: folk music and Opera. The music written by Suni - choral works, songs, several operas, symphonic and piano compositions - are examples of Armenian classical music based on the traditions of Armenian folk and the musical culture of the Armenian church. The composer collected Armenian folklore material both in Armenia and in the territory of modern-day Turkey and Iran. His opera Asli and Kyaram is based on Middle Eastern folk legend. In 1907, through the efforts of the Armenian Dramatic Society, the operetta Aregnazan was staged in Tiflis (Tbilisi). Suni's music evoked a lot of folk symbolism such as in his work Alagyaz (Ալագյազ) where he draws a relationship to the melody and the mountainside of the Aragats mountains for which the song is named. His musical works influenced the direction of Armenian music in the early 20th century towards a harmonic and polyphonic style and the construction of Armenian national identity in Armenian music.

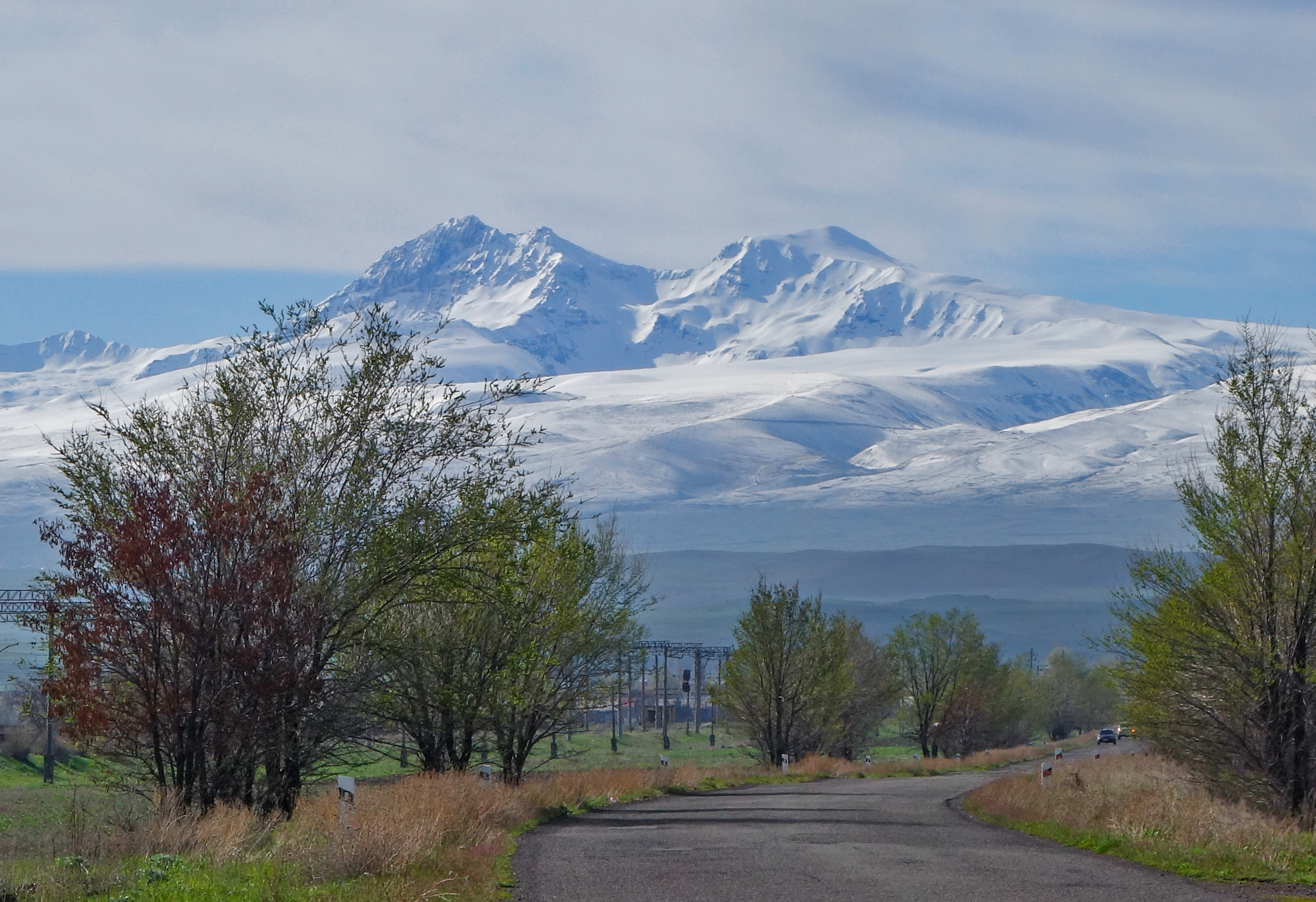
Aragats mountain, the setting of Suni's prolific work Alagyaz

== Political activity ==
Suni was known as an outspoken politician figure during his time. At a young age, Suni was influenced by socialist ideals spreading in the Russian Empire. Initially, Suni was part of the Armenian Revolutionary Federation, the Dashnaktsutyun, which was a socialist party. However, he had a falling out with the Dashnaks and later became an avid spokesperson for the Bolsheviks. Because of this, he was frequently persecuted for the political nature of his works by fellow Armenian nationalists and under constant threat of arrest. Along with the folk songs he collected, he also wrote militaristic songs that had strong communist themes. This would culminate into his eventual exile into the United States where he spent the rest of his life and joined the Armenian communist party of America, the Harajdimakan.

== Selected works ==
- Haykakan zhoghovrdakan yerger [Armenian folksongs]. St. Petersburg. 1904.
- Zhoghovrdakan yerger yev khmberger [Folksongs and choruses]. Yerevan. 1935.
- Hay yerg-pundj [A bouquet of Armenian songs]. folksong arrs. Philadelphia. 1940–47.
