= Makar Yekmalyan =

Armenian composer (1856–1905)

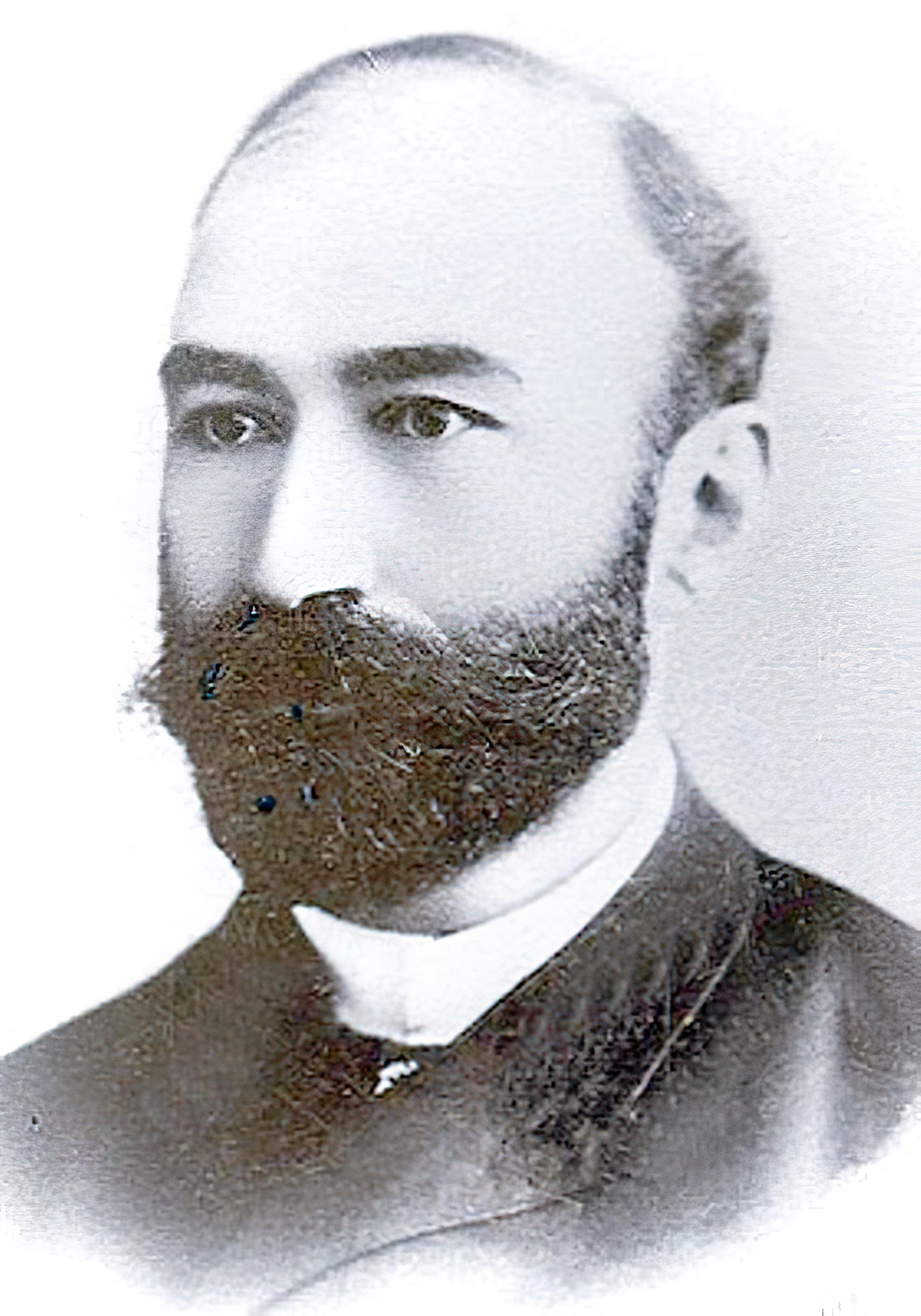
Makar Yekmalyan

Makar Grigori Yekmalyan (also transliterated Ekmalian; in Armenian Մակար Եկմալյան) (2 February 1856, Vagharshapat - 6 March 1905, Tiflis) was an Armenian composer.

== Biography ==
Yekmalyan studied at the Echmiadzin seminary and later in St Petersburg with Nikolai Rimsky-Korsakov. He then taught music in Tbilisi (Tiflis), where he died in 1905.

His most noted composition was the Patarag (in Armenian Պատարագ), the setting of the Armenian Apostolic Church's Divine Liturgy, which he completed in 1892 in several arrangements. Patarag was first published in Leipzig in 1896.

== Bibliography ==
- Nikoghos Tahmizian, Makar Yekmalian - Life and Work (in Armenian), 1981, Sovetakan Grogh Publishing, Yerevan, Armenia.
