= Edvard Mirzoyan =

Armenian composer

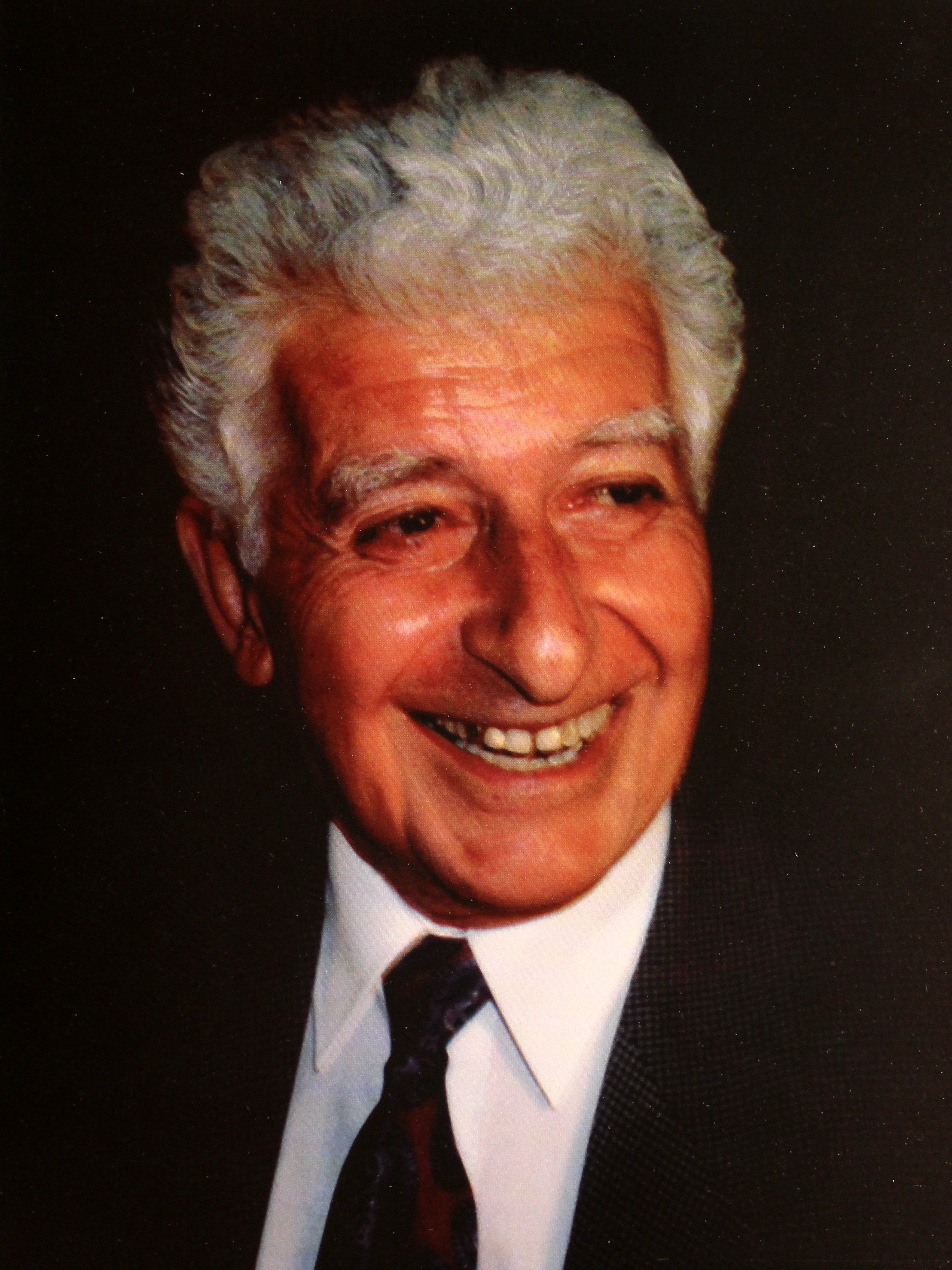
Edvard Mirzoyan

Edvard Mik'aeli Mirzoyan (Armenian: Էդվարդ Միքայելի Միրզոյան; May 12, 1921 – October 5, 2012) was an Armenian composer.

Edvard Mirzoyan was born in Gori, Georgia. He called himself an atheist, but added, "There is only one planet on which people live and are being born. And while it is, it's a miracle. A miracle, every leaf and every bug.... And it all depends on how you are able to enjoy this miracle. Some do not even think that they were born into a miracle."

He is considered one member of the group called "Armenia's Mighty Handful", a reference to the 19th century collective known as the "Mighty Handful." He is also considered an integral part to the "Armenian School" of music composition alongside the composers Arno Babajanian and Alexander Arutiunian.

== Biography ==
Mirzoyan first enrolled in music at the Yerevan Music School named after A. Spendiarov. He would later graduate from the Komitas State Conservatory in 1941 having studied under the Armenian composers Sargis Barkhudaryan and Vardges Talyan (the symphonic poem “Loretsi Sako” forming his graduate thesis work). He would soon be conscripted into the Red Army in 1942, and it is here where he would compose many patriotic and war-related songs.

In 1948, Mirzoyan would begin professorship at Yerevan Conservatory (a.k.a. Komitas State Conservatory of Yerevan), and would become the department head of composition in 1965. In 1952, he would also begin teaching at the R. O. Melikyan Musical College (now the Yerevan State Musical College after Romanos Melikyan).

In the late 1950s, he was elected president of the Armenian Composers’ Union, a position he held until 1991. He also served as the president of the Peace Foundation of Armenia. While president of the Composers' Union, Mirzoyan drove the development and construction of the Composers’ Union Resort in Dilijan, which now bears his name. The resort went on to be one of the most well-known cultural hubs of the Soviet Union.

== Family ==
Mirzoyan's mother and father was Colonial Semyon Alikhanov and Lusya B. Pershangova. His mother was an actress of the Sundukyan Theater and had trained at Yerevan Conservatory in classical singing, although she did not choose to pursue a career. He would be married to Elena (Heghine) Mamikonovna for 50 years.

== Music ==
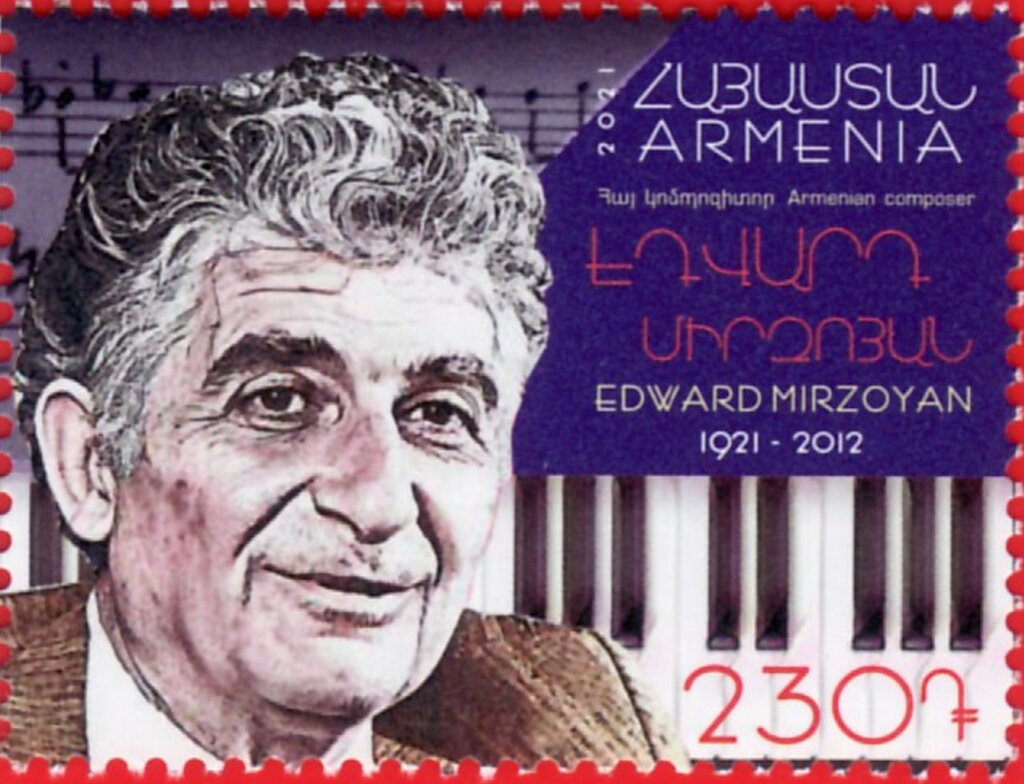
Mirzoyan on a 2021 stamp of Armenia

Mirzoyan's compositional output is relatively small but quite distinguished, combining graceful lyricism with intense drama. With its formal structure and tonal design, his style has been described as Neoclassical, with elements of Armenian folksong always present. Mirzoyan's String Quartet, Cello Sonata, Symphony for Strings and Timpani, and Epitaph for String Orchestra have become notable additions to the repertoire.

Edvard Mirzoyan died on October 5 of 2012, and is buried at the Komitas Pantheon which is located in the city center of Yerevan.

== Filmography ==
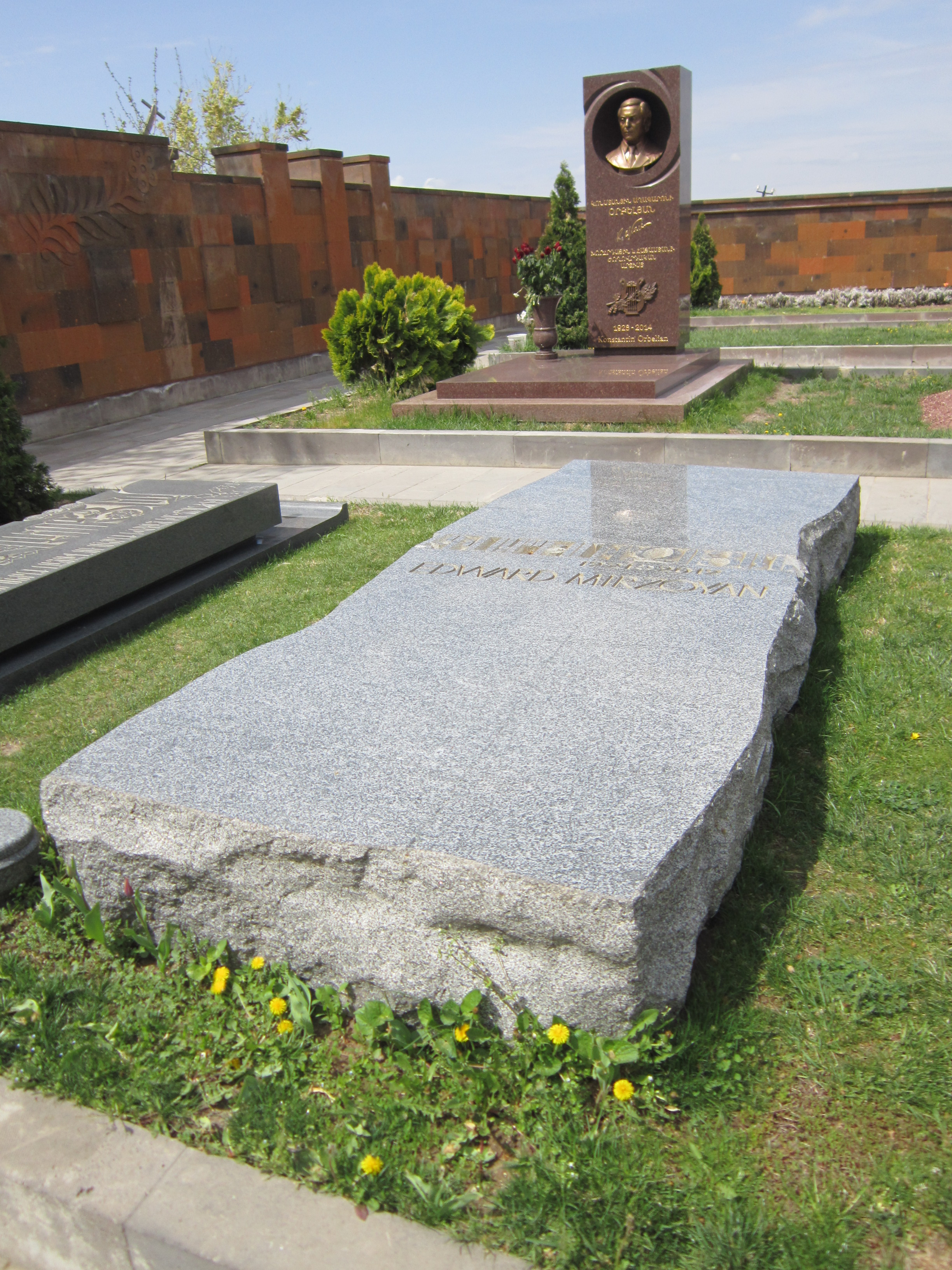
Mirzoyan's tombstone in Komitas Pantheon

- Yot hndik tghaner (Seven Indian Boys, 2007)
- Khachmeruki deghatune (Crossroad's pharmacy, 1988)
- Tasnerku ughekitsner (Twelve Companions, 1962)
- Pluzum (Collapse, 1960)
- Chaos (Chaos, 1973)
