= Sayat-Nova Music School =

Sayat-Nova School of Music
- Սայաթ-Նովայի անվան երաժշտական դպրոց
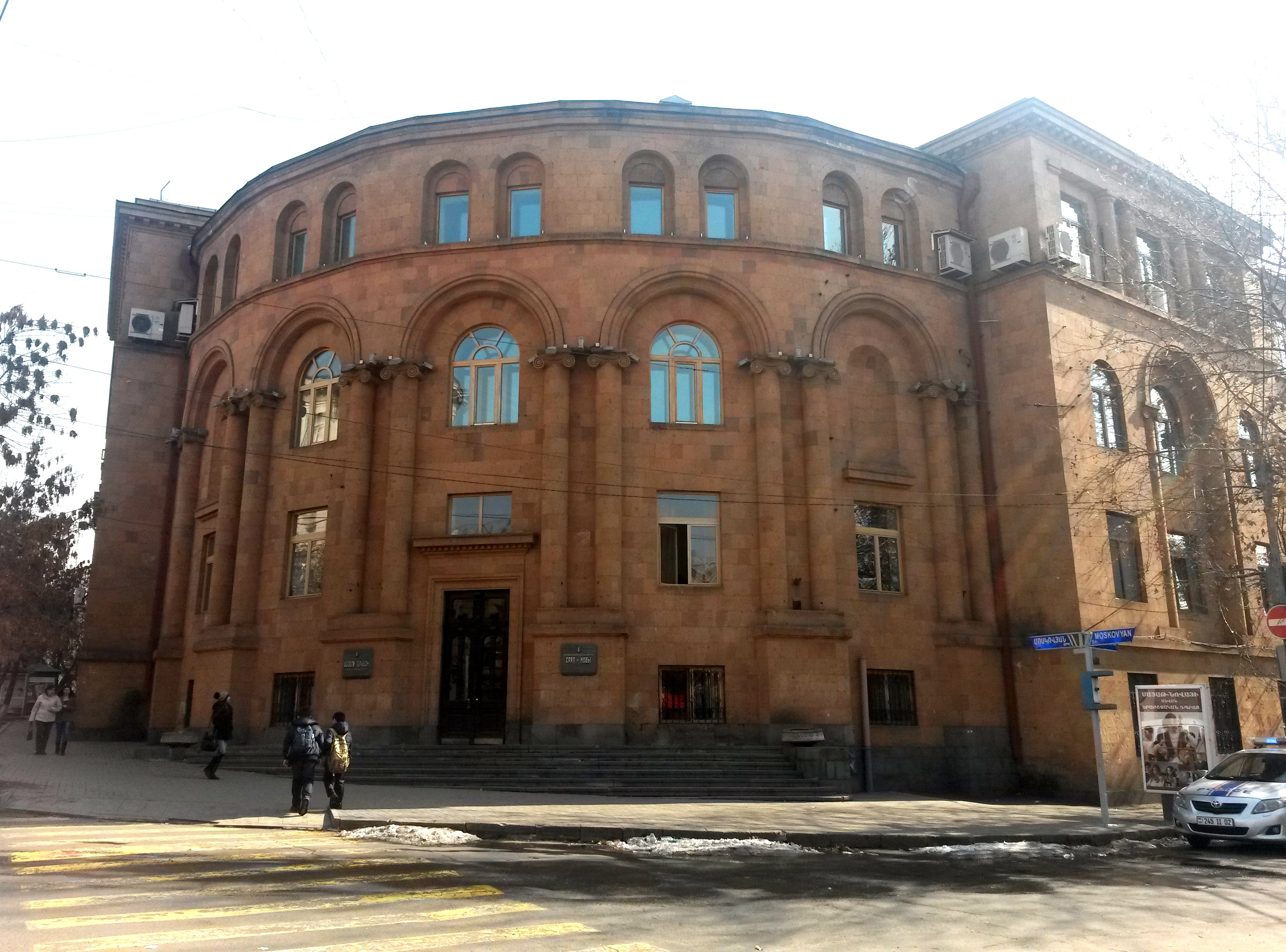

Location
- 46a Mesrop Mashtots Avenue, Kentron District; Yerevan; Armenia

Information
- School type: Music school
- Established: 1934
- Director: Tigran Hekekyan

The Sayat-Nova School of Music (Armenian: Սայաթ-Նովայի անվան երաժշտական դպրոց) is a music education institution in Yerevan, Armenia.

== History ==
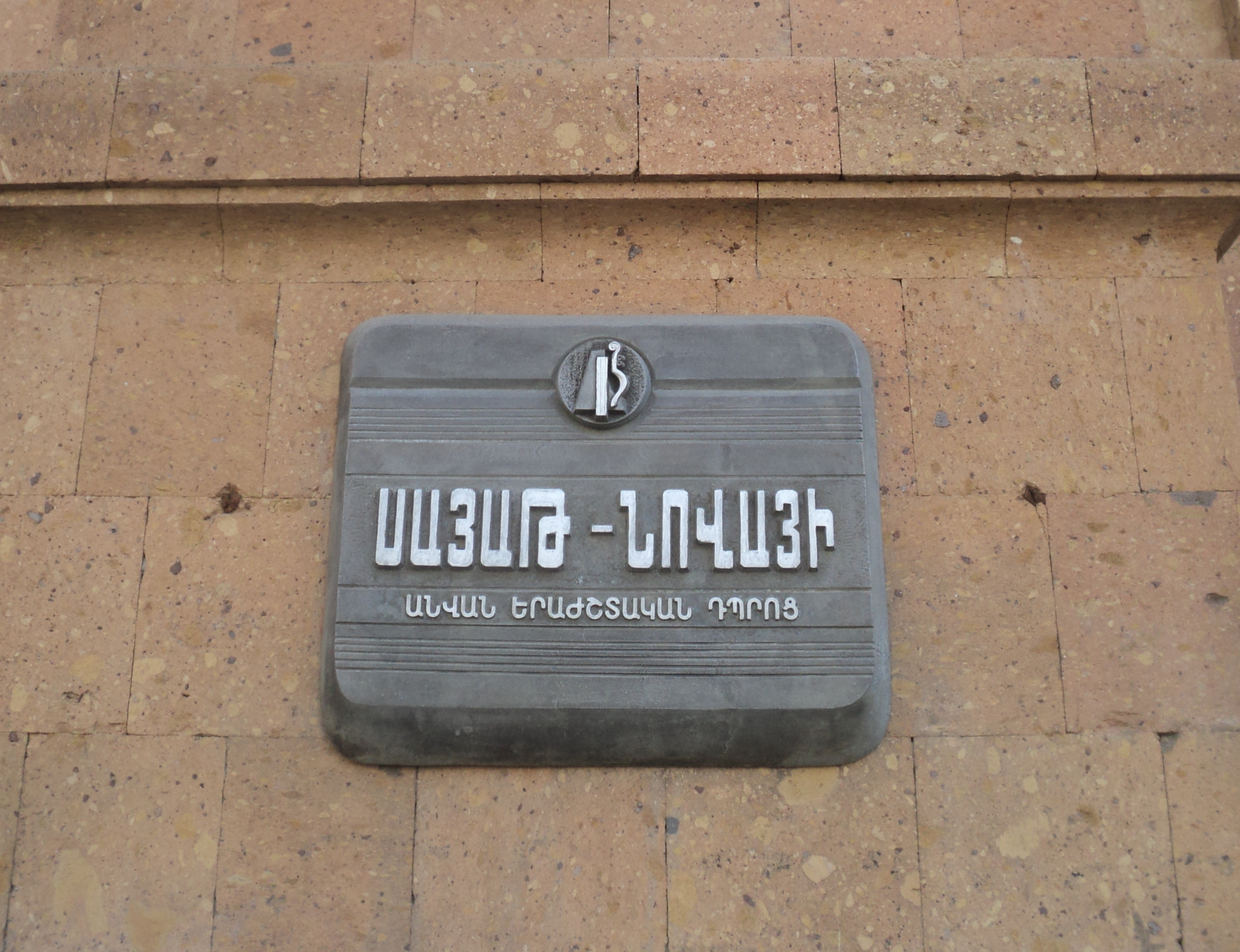
The school nameplate

The school was founded in 1934 by Varduhi Zakaryan as a small musical studio, she became its first director. In 1940, the studio became the third music school in Yerevan and had 200 pupils. In 1944, it was named after the Armenian ashugh Sayat-Nova. The choir and violin classrooms were created in 1970.

Tigran Hekekyan has been Director of the school since 2003.

== Alumni ==
- Eduard Topchjan
- Tigran Hekekyan
- Svetlana Navasardyan
- Barsegh Tumanyan
- Hasmik Papian
- Konstantin Petrossian
- Gagik Hovunts
- Ruben Sargsyan
- Sergei Babayan
- Vartan Adjemian
- Ruben Altunyan
- Arpine Martoyan
- Yuri Davtyan

== See also ==
- Komitas State Conservatory of Yerevan
