= Stepan Rostomyan =

Armenian composer (born 1956)

Stepan Rostomyan Ստեփան Ռոստոմյան
- Born: 4 April 1956 (age 70); Vanadzor, Armenia
- Education: Yerevan Komitas State Conservatory
- Occupation: Composer

Stepan Rostomyan (Armenian: Ստեփան Ռոստոմյան, born 4 April 1956) is an Armenian composer. He is a part of Armenia's contemporary music scene, as well as a composer whose works have been performed and broadcast internationally.

== Biography ==
Rostomyan studied in Yerevan Komitas State Conservatory composition faculty in the classes of Professor Ghazaros Saryan and Avet Terteryan. He became one of the most well known post Soviet Union composers who commissioned pieces for leading soloists and ensembles such as Oleg Kogan, Yuri Bashmet, David Geringas, London Sinfonietta, Ensemble Modern, and the Paragon Ensemble, among others. The Scottish Arts Council funded commissions from Rostomyan four times, and each of the premieres and performances was highly rated according to Herald. Rostomyan has written chamber and symphony works, mono opera, and vocal and instrumental compositions. One of his recent pieces "Tagh of Angels" a triple of Taghs (medieval form of Armenian sacred song) has been numerously performed in Switzerland, the United Kingdom and the United States to high acclaim. Rostomyan has written music to multiple films and theatrical performances. He is a frequent lecturer on Armenian music and culture in international conferences. In 1989 he was invited to work at Glasgow University's electro acoustic music studio and has afterwards established an electronic music department at the Yerevan Conservatory. Students of Rostomyan's class are leading young composers of Armenia who are winners of the first places at prestigious international composing competitions. Mr. Rostomyan is one of "...about 500 leading composers of the second half of our century..." from all over the world whose life and activity are included in the Contemporary Composers reference book from Gale Research International.

== Career ==
- 1980-1984: Music assistant of the Armenian Academic State Choir
- 1988: Professor of composition and orchestral studies at Yerevan State Conservatory
- 1989-1990: Invited to work at the University of Glasgow, Scotland, in the electronic acoustic music studio
- 1990-1992: Head of Music Department of the Yerevan State Academic Theatre of Drama
- 1994-2002: Editor-in-chief of treasure of Armenian medieval music "Sharakan" publication in European notation in six volumes
- 1997: Director of the Armenian center of modern music
- 1999: Founding Director of the Armenian Center for Contemporary Music
- 1999: Member of the American Society of Composers, Authors and Publishers (ASCAP)
- 2000-2002: Chief of Music Department of VEM classical music radio station
- 2000: Founding President and Artistic Director of "Yerevan Perspectives" annual international music festival
- 2001-2002: Artistic Director of "For you, Christian Armenia" and "Pan Christian Culture" international classical and sacred music festivals of the State Commission to celebrate the 1700th anniversary of the proclamation of Christianity as the state religion of Armenia

== Brief list of compositions and main performances ==
- "Tagh of Annunciation" (2008) – for flute, oboe, violin, cello, piano soprano & percussions. Commissioned by Cove Park Artists Residency, UK
- "Tagh of Holy Trinity" (2012) – for flute, oboe, violin, cello, piano soprano & percussions. Commissioned by Dilijan Concert Series, LA, USA. Performed in Los Angeles
- "Entrance" Opera (2002) – for orchestra, folk instruments (duduk, zurna, pku), Scottish bagpipe and Australian didgeridoo. Commissioned by London Sinfonietta and first performed in Yerevan in Sep 2002 by London Sinfonietta, conducted by Diego Masson
- "Tagh of Angels" (2001) – for flute, oboe, violin, cello, piano & soprano. Commissioned and first performed by "Ensemble of Soloists" (Switzerland) in Zürich 20 September 2001
- 2000 - Wrote music for "Khor Virap" theatrical performance and film by Khoren Abrahamyan, commissioned by the government of Armenia and Catholics of all Armenians
- Symphony No. 4 (1998) – commissioned by Paragon Ensemble and the Scottish Arts Council. There are two versions of the symphony. The first one is for the entire symphony orchestra and tapes such as choirs, church bells, percussion and the *Armenian folk instrument duduk. The second version is written for 15 soloists and tapes. The world premiere of the second version of the Symphony was given in The Royal Scottish Academy of Music and Drama by Paragon Ensemble, conducted by David *Davies in Glasgow March 1997. Later it has been performed by different ensembles worldwide. The Symphony's version for the entire symphony orchestra and tapes has been selected for being performed in the Opening Ceremony of the "7th International *Review of Contemporary Music" in Belgrade in 1998 by Belgrade Philharmonic Orchestra, conductor Laurent Cuniot
- Wind Quintet No.2 (1989) – commissioned by Paragon Ensemble and "New Beginnings" festival. The world premiere was given in the "New Beginnings" international festival by Paragon Ensemble Scotland, conducted by David Davies in Glasgow 1989. The Quintet has performed, and been broadcast, internationally. In 2015 the piece was performed and broadcast at Ljubljana Festival, and Emilia Romagna Festival.
- Symphony No. 3(1989) – for chamber ensemble and tapes commissioned by Paragon Ensemble and the "New Beginnings" festival, the world premiere was given in the "New Beginnings" festival, in the Stevenson Hall of The Royal Scottish Academy of Music and Drama by Paragon Ensemble, conducted by David Davies in Glasgow November 1989
- Symphony No. 2 "Lux Aeterna" (1986) - for chamber orchestra and a choir, 2 soloists and numerous church bells
- "Tanca" (1983) – vocal cycle for voice and piano after medieval Japanese poets. First performed in the Composer's Union Congress in Yerevan. The work had great success at the Transcaucasian Composer's festival in Tbilisi (Georgia). Following several performances it was rated as one of the best Armenian compositions
- Symphony No. 1 (1980) – for full symphony orchestra. Won the prize at the Republic Symphony Music Competition. The premiere was given on March 16, 2007 by the Armenian Philharmonic Orchestra conducted by Paul MacAlindin (Scotland/Germany)
- Wind Quintet No. 1(1980) – first performed by Ensemble of soloists of Yerevan State Opera Theater
- Sketches (1980) – for symphony orchestra
- Trio (1979) – for violin, clarinet and piano, first performed by Yerevan Symphonic orchestra soloists in 1980
- String Quartet (1978) -first performed by Yerevan State Conservatory String Quartet
- 2007 - (Documentary film "Armenians of Krim", Moscow, dir. A. Kalyadin)
- 2014 - Feature film "With Autumn in Heart" (dedicated to Leonid Engibarov), Moscow, dir. G. Parajanov)

== Awards ==
- Recipient of the Gold Medal given by the Mayor of Yerevan (Yerevan, 2014)
- In 2009 S. Rostomyan received the title of Meritorious Worker of Arts of Armenia by the order of the President of Armenia Serzh Sargsyan.
- Professor of Composition and Orchestral studies at Yerevan State Conservatory since 1989
- Academic of the International Academy of Sciences of Nature and Society /IASNS/ (2003)
- Vice-President of the Arts Department of IASNS (2005)
- Academic at the European International Academy of Sciences (2006)
- Recipient of Albert Schweitzer Medal (2005, Hanover)
- Recipient of "Peter the First" Medal (2006, Moscow)
- Recipient of Gold Medal on the Ministry of Culture of Armenia (2006)

== Critic's responses ==
"Atmospheric sounds of the Armenian Church music mingled with electronic strings and piano timbres and the acoustic instruments in a slow and solemn movement that reached a searingly intense climax. Those two pieces rate as the most sincere works so far played in the "New Beginnings" Festival."
Janet Beat ("Scotsman", 28 November 1989)

"Rostomyan's Third Symphony-the great popular success of "New Beginnings" - carried its listeners inexorably from its wonderfully atmospheric opening, to the voluptuous, Holywoodish glamour of its heavenly chorus."
Michael Timelty ("Glasgow Herald", 29 November 1989)

"I was most intrigued by the Third Symphony. It is a fascinating work and beautifully composed."
Harold Hagopian (RCA/Victor BMG producer, 2002)

"Stepan Rostomyan's music reflects a synthesis of European and Oriental traditions, In Rostomyan's music one can hear influences of the ancient Armenian monody; it is very coloristic and religious. His Symphony and some miniatures – for example "The Angeles'" Canticles are popular in the West."
Mark Rais ("A Special Issue of Leonardo", USA Volume 24:2, 1991)
