= Robert Amirkhanyan =

Armenian composer and songwriter

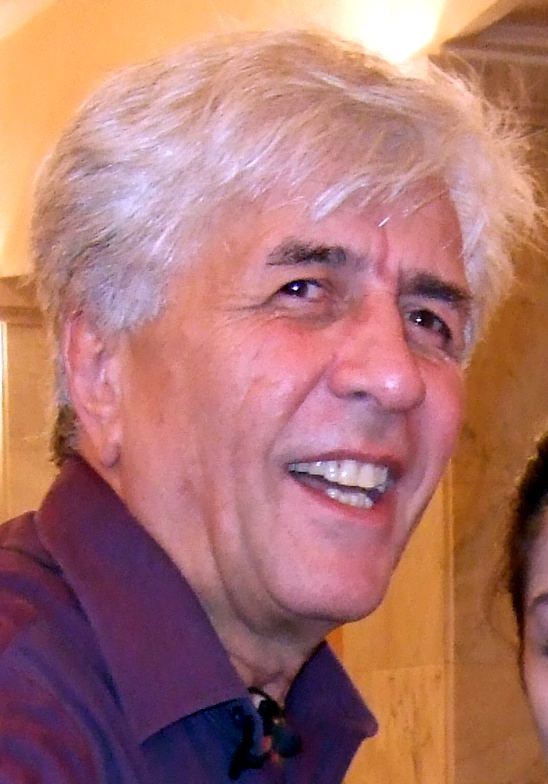

Background information
- Born: November 16, 1939 (age 86); Yerevan, Armenian SSR, Soviet Union
- Occupations: Composer and songwriter
- Instrument: Piano

Robert Babkeni Amirkhanyan (Armenian: Ռոբերտ Բաբկենի Ամիրխանյան; born November 16, 1939) is an Armenian composer and songwriter. He is a professor at the Yerevan State Conservatory. He wrote over 300 songs, vocal series, operettas.

== Career ==
In 1969 Amirkhanyan graduated from the Yerevan State Conservatory, class of Eduard Mirzoyan. From 1969 to 1972 Amirkhanyan was the musical editor of Armenian Radio. From 1991 to 2013, he served as the President of the Union of Composers of Armenia. He is an author of many popular Armenian songs ("Hayreni yerkir", "Hayi achker", "Ding-dong", "Arise!", "Arevot andzrev"), soundtracks of films, animation cartoons, operettas, as well as the first Armenian musical, entitled "The Oriental Dentist". He wrote music for 16 feature films and about 30 animated films. His songs were performed by Raisa Mkrtchyan, Muslim Magomayev, Larisa Mondrus. According to Mir TV, "in the Soviet Union, everyone knew him for his music". Amirkhanyan's "Variations for String Quartet" won the first prize in the Young Composers' Competition of the USSR in 1969. In 1973 Amirkhanyan's song "Where Are You Boys" won the "Best Song" award at the Berlin City World Youth Festival. In 1975 his composition "Autumn Melody" won the 3rd prize at the Sopot International Song Festival. In 2012, he was awarded the State Prize of the Republic of Armenia for his Yerevan Rhapsody. He is the author of a cantata-oratorio, orchestral, piano, choral and vocal music.

From 1999 to 2003 he was a member of the National Assembly of Armenia.

== Awards and prizes ==
- Armenian Music Awards Lifetime Achievement Award (2002)
- Honored Artist of Armenia (1984)
- People's Artist of the Armenian SSR (1987)
- Order of St. Mesrop Mashtots (1998)
- Order of Honor (2017)
- State Prize of the Republic of Armenia (2012)
- Lenin Komsomol Prize (1980) for 1978–1979 song cycles

== Filmography ==
- 1968 – A Drop of Honey, animation
- 1970 – Heghnar's Spring
- 1971 – Pui-Pui Mouse, animation
- 1972 – Hayrik
- 1972 – The Men
- 1974 – Abu-Hasan's Slippers, animation
- 1976 – And Then You Will Come Back...
- 1976 – Blonde Plane
- 1980 – Panos the Clumsy, animation
- 1983 – Wow, a Talking Fish!, animation (a remix of the main motive became a hit in Russia in the 2000s)
- 1984 – In the Blue Sea, In the White Foam, animation
- 1986 – Death of the Mouse, animation
- 1994 – The Axe, animation
