= Maria Abajan =

Armenian–American soprano (born 1950)

Maria Abajan (Armenian: Մարիա Աբաջան; born 1950) is an Armenian-born American soprano and voice teacher. She had an international performance career during the 1980s and 1990s.

== Life and career ==
Maria Abajan was born in 1950 in Yerevan, Armenia. She was educated at the Komitas State Conservatory of Yerevan and the Moscow Conservatory. In 1977 she immigrated with her family to the United States and pursued further studies in music at the University of California, Los Angeles. She was also student of the Merola Opera Program at the San Francisco Opera Center in the summer of 1979. That year she was a finalist in San Francisco Opera Auditions. Around this time she won the San Francisco district division of the Metropolitan Opera National Council Auditions, and subsequently won the Mario del Monaco Competition in Italy and won an international singing competition held in San Luis Potosí, Mexico.

From 1982 to 1986 Abajan was a resident principal soprano with the Mannheim National Theatre. In 1985 she performed both Abigaille in Verdi's Nabucco, and the title role in Puccini's Turandot with the Opéra Royal de Wallonie in Liége. In 1986 she made her United Kingdom debut in the title role of Verdi's Aida with Opera North; taking over the part from ailing Valerie Popova shortly before the production opened at the end of its rehearsal period. John Pryce-Jones conducted this production with a cast that included Seppo Ruohonen as Radamès and Linda Finnie as Amneris. She soon after sang Aida at the Zurich Opera, and at the Municipal Theatre of Santiago in Chile.

In 1987 she repeated the role of Abigaille in Liége, and sang that same role at La Monnaie in Brussels. That same year she appeared at the Strasbourg Opera House as Santuzza in Cavalleria Rusticana. In 1988 she repeated the role of Turandot at the Palais des Sports, Liège. That same year she appeared at the Hamburg State Opera as Elisabeth de Valois in Don Carlos and Leonora in Il trovatore. In the late late 1980s she appeared at the Aalto Theatre in Essen as Amelia in Un ballo in maschera and Tosca. The latter production co-starred José Carreras as Cavaradossi.

In 1990 Abajan performed at the Theatre Royal, Glasgow with the Scottish Opera in the title role of Giacomo Puccini's Tosca with conductor Alexander Gibson. She returned to Liège to perform Santuzza in 1990 and Abigaille in 1991. In 1991-1992 she was committed to the Vienna State Opera where she appeared as Tosca and as Leonora in La forza del destino. In 1993 she reprised the role of Abigaille at the Bregenzer Festspiele, and appeared at the Teatro Real in Madrid as Giorgetta in Il tabarro. In 1995 she gave a recital at the Bovard Auditorium at the University of Southern California. She portrayed Santuzza at the Berlin State Opera (1997) and the Opéra de Nice (1999).

Now retired from the stage, Abajan currently works as a voice teacher.
