= Ruben Sargsyan =

Armenian composer

Ruben Sargsyan Ռուբեն Սարգսյան
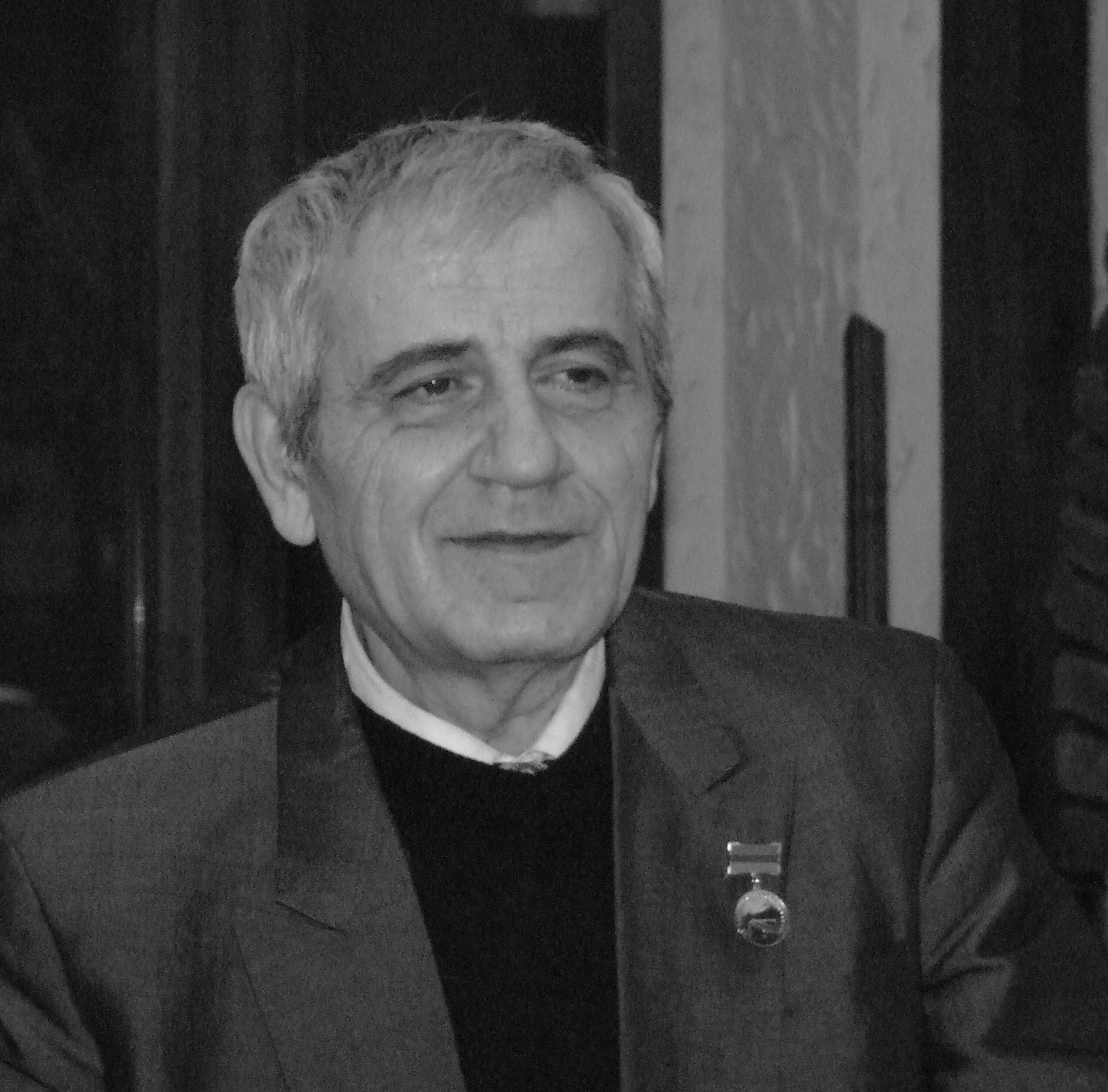
- Ruben Sargsyan, Yerevan, Armenia, 2008

Background information
- Born: November 22, 1945; Yerevan, Armenia
- Died: April 6, 2013 (aged 67) Yerevan, Armenia
- Genres: Classical
- Occupation: Composer

Ruben Sargsyan, also seen as Sarkisyan (Armenian: Ռուբեն Սարգսյան; November 22, 1945 – April 6, 2013), was an Armenian composer, laureate of the State Award of Armenia, professor of the Yerevan Komitas State Conservatory.

== Biography ==
Ruben Sargsyan was born in Yerevan, Armenia, in the family of scientist agronome Suren Sargsyan. He first began to study at the Sayat-Nova Music School, then continued his education at the Romanos Melikian Music College. At the second year of college education he has been recommended and transferred to the music composition class of the Yerevan Komitas State Conservatory, where he studied with professor Ghazaros Saryan. He graduated from the Conservatory in 1972 and became a member of the Composers' Union. In 1973-1985 Ruben Sargsyan has been teaching Music Theory and Solfege at the Yerevan Music School No.10. In 1987-2013 he has taught Music Composition and Modern Composition Technology at the Yerevan Komitas State Conservatory. In 2004 became a Professor of Music. In 1994 Ruben Sargsyan, along with other modern Armenian composers and musicologists, established the Armenian Musical Assembly, non-governmental, non-for-profit organization, intended to promote and support modern Armenian Music worldwide.

== Awards ==
- 2007 - received the State Award of Armenia for his orchestral cycle My coeval.
- 1993 - became a laureate of the national competition The Best Symphonic Composition for his Symphonic Poem.
- 1978 - received the Best Composition of the Year national award for his Cello Concerto No.1

== Selected compositions ==
- Rock-ballet The Invisible Man, libretto based on Herbert Wells novel, 2000
- Symphony No.1 for symphonic orchestra on YouTube, 1986 (Komitas publishing, Yerevan, 2012)
- Symphony No.2, Ironica, for symphonic orchestra, 1989 (Komitas publishing, Yerevan, 2010)
- Symphony No.3, The Chronicle, for symphonic orchestra (published, Komitas publishing, Yerevan, 2005)
- Symphony In modo passacaglia for chamber orchestra, 1984
- Concerto No.1 for Violin and Chamber orchestra, 1983 (published, Sovetakan Grogh publishing, Yerevan, 1989)
- Concerto No.2 for Violin and Chamber orchestra, 1984 (published, Komitas publishing, Yerevan, 2009)
- Concerto No.3 for Violin and Chamber orchestra, 1989
- Concerto No.4 for Violin and Chamber orchestra, 2001 (published, Komitas publishing, Yerevan, 2003)
- Concerto No.1 for Cello and Symphonic orchestra, 1977
- Concerto No.2 for Cello and Chamber orchestra, 1979
- Concerto No.3 for Cello and Chamber orchestra, 1989
- Concerto No.4 for Cello and Chamber orchestra, 1994
- Concerto for Viola and Chamber orchestra, 1992
- Cogitation for cello and chamber orchestra on YouTube(in memory of Gh. Saryan), 2000. (published, Komitas publishing, Yerevan, 2001)
- In memory for Chamber orchestra, celesta and percussion (in memory of Avet Terteryan), 1996 (published, Komitas publishing, Yerevan, 2001)
- Concertino for String orchestra, 1996 (published, Komitas publishing, Yerevan, 2001)
- Elegy for flute and string ensemble, 1998
- Junior concerto for piano and string orchestra, 1983
- String Quartet, 1982, Sovetakan Grogh publishing, 1983
- Trio for Violin, Cello and Piano, 1984, Komitas publishing, 2002
- Sonata for Flute and Piano, 2001
- Sonata for Cello and Piano on YouTube, 1977, Soviet Composer publishing, 1980
- Sonata No.1 for Violin and Piano, 1976, Sovetakan Grogh publishingb, 1982
- Sonata No.2 for Violin and Piano on YouTube, 1978, Soviet Composer publishing, 1984
- Piano sonata, 1980, Sovetakan Grogh publishingb, 1982
- Armenian graphics 5 pieces for piano solo, 1975, Sovetakan Grogh publishingb, 1982
- Cercio declamando for cello solo, 2001, Komitas publishing, 2006
- Nerses Shnorhali poem for flute, piano and reciter, 1975
- A gift to Komitas 7 pieces for piano solo, 1987, Komitas publishing, 2002
- Piano Sonatina No.1, 1968, Sovetakan Grogh publishing, 1985
- Piano Sonatina No.2, 1980
- Piano Sonatina No.3, 1981
- Piano Sonatina No.4, 1987, Komitas publishing, 2000
- Album for the Young for Piano solo, 1983, Komitas publishing, 2000
- Requiem for September for Chamber orchestra, dedicated to the victims of 9/11, 2003
- My coeval cycle for Chamber orchestra (1. Deir ez-Zor survivor's confession on YouTube, 2. All that remains, 3. Return to its circuit on YouTube, 4. Mass for the ghost), 2005–2006, Komitas publishing, 2006, Amrots Group publishing, 2011
- Call the Spring for Flute, Glockenspiel and chamber ensemble, 2007-2009
- Mozart's will for flute, oboe, clarinet in B, fagot, trumpet in B, trombone, timpani and chamber ensemble, 2008
- Black ball for flute, glockenspiel and chamber ensemble, 2007-2009
- Farewell for piano and chamber ensemble on YouTube, in memory of musicologist Irina Tigranova, 2011
- Rhapsody for piano and chamber orchestra on YouTube, 2011
- The death of the Legend for Piano solo, 2012
- String Quartet, in memory of composer Edvard Mirzoyan, 2012

== Links ==
- www.panarmenian.net/rus/culture/news/39564/
- www.armtown.com/news/ru/pan/20091123/39781/
- www.biografija.ru/show_bio.aspx?id=115278
- www.golos.am/index.php?option=com_content&task=view&id=10201&Itemid=53
