= Mansourian =

Mansourian is a surname. Notable people with the surname include:

- Alireza Mansourian (born 1971), Iranian footballer
- Arax Mansourian (born 1946), Armenian singer
- Elaheh Mansourian (born 1991), Iranian wushu athlete
- Tigran Mansurian (born 1939), Armenian musician and composer
