= Juliana Grigoryan =

Armenian operatic soprano

- Born: 1997 or 1998 (age 28–29); Yerevan, Armenia
- Education: Yerevan State Conservatory
- Occupation: Operatic soprano

Juliana Grigoryan (Armenian: Ջուլիանա Գրիգորյան; born 1997 or 1998 (age 28–29) is an Armenian operatic soprano. Born in Yerevan, she studied at the Yerevan State Conservatory, from which she has a Master's degree. Winner of the Grand Prize at the International Stanisław Moniuszko Vocal Competition and the First and Audience prizes at the 2022 Operalia competition, she has performed alongside Plácido Domingo and Andrea Bocelli and under the baton of Riccardo Muti. She made her debut with the Metropolitan Opera in 2024 as Liù, going on to perform there in 2025 and at the Royal Opera House in 2026 as Mimì.
