= Yeritsyan =

Yeritsyan (Armenian: Երիցյան) is an Armenian surname. Notable people with the surname include:

- Nerses Yeritsyan (born 1971), Armenian politician
- Varduhi Yeritsyan (born 1981), Franco-Armenian classical pianist
