= Gevorg Geodakyan =

Armenian musicologist

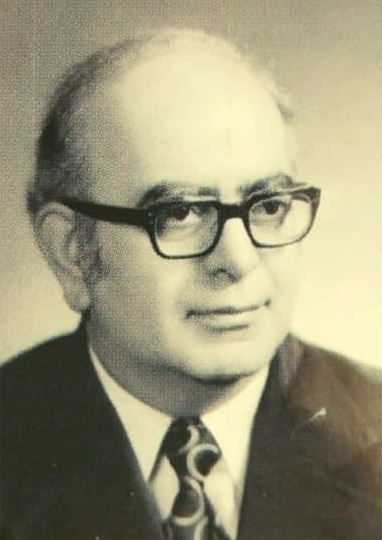
- Born: 12 August 1928; Gyumri, Armenia (then Leninakan, Soviet Union)
- Died: 20 December 2015 (aged 87)
- Education: Yerevan Komitas State Conservatory (1952), Moscow Conservatory (1956)
- Occupation: musicologist

Gevorg Shmavoni Geodakyan (Armenian: Գևորգ Շմավոնի Գյոդակյան; Russian: Гео́ргий Шмаво́нович Геодакя́н, romanized: Georgy Shmavonovich Geodakyan; 12 August 1928 – 20 December 2015) was an Armenian musicologist. He headed the Music Department of the Institute of Arts of the Armenian Academy of Sciences since 1966.

Born in Leninakan (present-day Gyumri), Geodakyan first graduated from the Yerevan Komitas State Conservatory in 1952 and then completed his postgraduate studies at the Moscow Conservatory in 1956. He died on 20 December 2015 at the age of 87.
