= Svetlana Navasardyan =

Armenian pianist (born 1946)

Svetlana Navasardyan Armenian: Սվետլանա Նավասարդյան
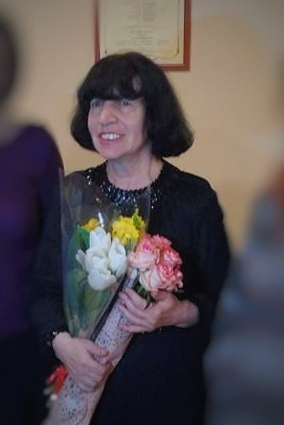

Background information
- Born: October 29, 1946 (age 79); Alaverdi, Armenian SSR, USSR
- Origin: Soviet Union, Armenia
- Genre: Classical
- Occupations: Pianist, Music teacher, Conductor
- Instrument: Piano
- Years active: 1966–present
- Labels: Melodiya, Naxos

Svetlana Navasardyan (Armenian: Սվետլանա Նավասարդյան, also known as Navassardian, born October 29, 1946), is an Armenian classical concert pianist.

A disciple of Vache Umr-Shat and Yakov Zak, she first stood out at the East German musical scene, being awarded prizes at Zwickau's Robert Schumann (1966) and Leipzig's Johann Sebastian Bach Competition (1968). She later became a prizewinner at the Queen Elisabeth Music Competition (1972) and at the inaugural edition of the Sydney International Piano Competition (1977). She has performed at an intercontinental level.

Navasardyan was distinguished as People's Artist of the Armenian SSR in 1984 and was awarded an Armenian SSR State Prize four years later. She is a professor at the Komitas State Conservatory of Yerevan.

== Biography ==
From 1965 to 1968, Navasardyan studied at Komitas State Conservatory of Yerevan in Vache Umr-Shat's class. In 1971, she graduated from Moscow State Tchaikovsky Conservatory (student in Yakov Zak's class), and in 1973 from postgraduate studies. In 1966, Navasardyan started performing as a soloist with the Armenian Philharmonic Orchestra. In 1974, Navasardyan began teaching at Yerevan State Conservatory, she became an associate professor in 1981 and professor in 1989.

Her repertoire includes Bach, Scarlatti, Mozart, Haydn, Beethoven, Schubert, Schumann, Chopin, Brahms, Liszt, Rachmaninoff, Prokofiev, Hindemith, Shostakovich, Komitas, Khachaturian, Hovunts, Mansurian's and other's compositions. Her performances are distinguished by a unique interpretation that combines scale, dramatic equipment, power, and poetry. Navasardyan has performed concerts in many countries around the world, joined international festivals in Paris, Granada, and Echternach (Luxembourg), and served as a member of the jury during international competitions.

== Awards ==
- 2nd Trans-Caucasus Piano Competition: 1st prize (1965)
- Robert Schumann International Competition for Pianists and Singers: 2nd prize (1966)
- International Johann Sebastian Bach Competition: 4th prize (1968)
- Lenin Komsomol Prize of Armenia (1970)
- Queen Elisabeth Competition: 5th prize and silver medal (1972)
- Sydney International Piano Competition: 2nd prize (1977)
- Merited Artist of the Armenian SSR (1977)
- Order of the Badge of Honour (1981)
- People's Artist of the Armenian SSR (1984)
- Armenian SSR State Prize (1988)
- Movses Khorenatsi medal (1998)
- Order of St. Mesrop Mashtots (2010)
- Order of Armenian Apostolic Church «St. Sahak and St. Mesrop» (2015)
- Order of Honor (2016)
- Honorary citizen of Yerevan (2021)
- Honorary Academic Artist of the Piano World Academy (2025)
