= Liparit Avetisyan =

Armenian operatic tenor

- Born: 1990; Yerevan, Armenia
- Education: Tchaikovsky Moscow State Conservatory; Komitas State Conservatory of Yerevan
- Occupation: Operatic tenor

Liparit Avetisyan (Armenian: Լիպարիտ Ավետիսյան) is an Armenian operatic tenor. Born in Yerevan in 1990, he studied at the Tchaikovsky Moscow State Conservatory and Komitas State Conservatory of Yerevan. He made his debut at the Royal Opera House as Alfredo during the 2016/17 season.

== Awards ==
- Golden Mask (Best Opera Actor)
- Swallow Music Award
- Honoured Artist of the Republic of Armenia

== Discography ==
- Verdi Otello (Cassio), Antonio Pappano (conductor), Sony, 2020 (Cat: 19439707932)
- Verdi Rigoletto (Duke of Mantua), Antonio Pappano (conductor), Opus Arte (DVD)
- Donizetti L'elisir d'amore (Nemorino), Sesto Quatrini (conductor), Opus Arte (DVD)
