= Siranush Gasparyan =

Armenian dramatic soprano

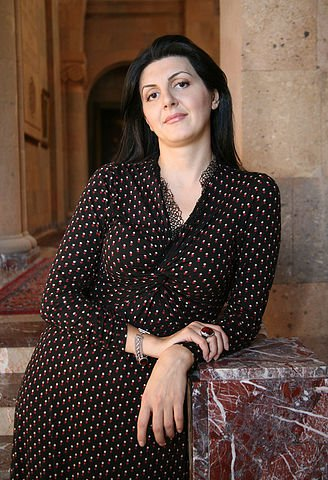
Siranush Gasparyan

Siranush Gasparyan (Armenian: Սիրանուշ Գասպարյան) (born on August 22, 1978, in Sukhum, Georgian SSR, Soviet Union) is an Armenian dramatic soprano.

== Biography ==
Siranush Gasparyan was born in Sukhum in 1978. In 1991 her family moved to Yerevan, Armenia where Siranush graduated from Music High School after Tchaikovsky. In 2002 she got double Master Degree from Fortepiano and Vocal (Opera singing) departments of the Yerevan State Conservatory after Komitas. From 2003 – 2005 she was enrolled in post-graduate vocal course, class of the professor Elena Vardanyan. Since year 2001 Siranush is performing on the stage, participates in singing contents in Armenia and Europe, she is also teaching at the Yerevan State Conservatory.

Gasparyan is a highly regarded performer with the Armenian Philharmonic Orchestra where she has been a top billed soloist. She has performed as a soloist at venues like the Armenian theater and internationally in venues like Days of Armenian Culture 2014 in Stuttgart.

== Key performances ==
- October, 2010, Yerevan, Armenia. Concert with National Chamber Orchestra of Armenia, Conductor Ruben Asatryan. In the program: Vivaldi, Andriessen, Aram Satian
- February, 2010, Yerevan, Armenia. Recital at House of Chamber Music named after Komitas. In the program: Wagner, Beethoven, Mozart, Barber, Medtner, Rachmaninoff, Tchaikovsky
- April, 2009, Yerevan, Armenia. Recital at House of Chamber music named after Komitas (voice and organ). In the program: European and Armenian spiritual music
- October, 2009, Yerevan, Armenia. Concert with Veradznund Chamber Orchestra, Conductor Ruben Asatryan. In the program: Handel
- December, 2009, Ruben Asatryan. Concert with National Chamber Orchestra of Armenia, Conductor Ruben Asatryan. In the program: Symphony No. 2 (Mahler)
