= Gerard Jirayr Svazlian =

- Born: September 19, 1945 (age 80); Alexandria, Egypt
- Occupation: Violinist

Violinist Gerard Jirayr Svazlian was born in Alexandria, Egypt (September 19, 1945) to Armenian parents. After the Second World War, in 1947 his family moved to the Soviet Republic of Armenia, where his father died at age 44. Since his father was an artistic personality, it was his dream to see three of his five children become musicians. Svazlian’s mother chose the violin for Gerard, the cello for his brother, and the piano for his sister; his two oldest sisters became scholars.

Gerard started playing the violin at the age of seven and continued his studies at the prestigious Romanos Melikian Music Institute and Komitas Conservatory. During his school years he taught violin and played in the Yerevan State Opera Orchestra. With his brother and sister, he formed a trio and concertized in the former Soviet Republics, Eastern Europe, and the United States. Svazlian arrived in New York City in 1975, where he played in various orchestras, including the Metropolitan Opera Orchestra. In 1978 he moved to San Francisco where he began a very intense and fruitful career. The same year he married Anahit; he and his wife have two children: Monique and Rosy Svazlian.

Svazlian joined the San Francisco Opera, Ballet, Symphony and Chamber Orchestras while teaching at the San Francisco Conservatory of Music. He has been a tenured member of the San Francisco Opera Orchestra since 1981. Svazlian served as President of the San Francisco Music Teachers’ Association from 1992 - 2002. He was granted the Certificate of Honor by Mayor Willie Brown and an award for Dedicated Leadership from the Music Teachers Association of California, San Francisco.

Svazlian led the effort to stage the world premiere of the first Armenian classical opera, Arshak II, raising one million dollars from the Armenian community for the 2001 performances.
