= Kariné Poghosyan =

Armenian-American pianist

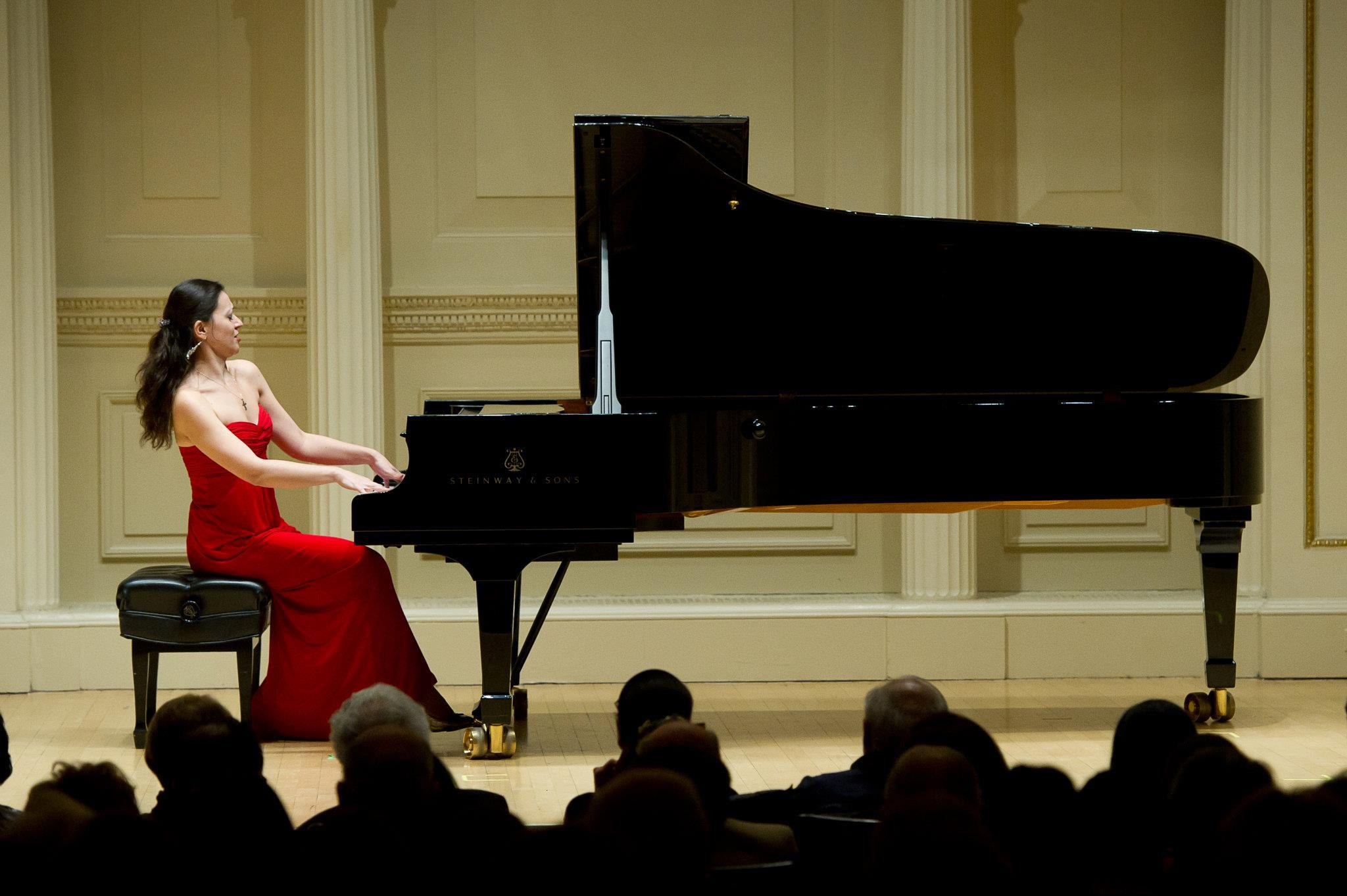
- Kariné Poghosyan performing at Carnegie Hall

Background information
- Origin: Yerevan, Armenia
- Instrument: Piano

Kariné Poghosyan is an Armenian pianist residing in New York City. She made her orchestral debut at the age of 14 playing Beethoven's Piano Concerto No. 1, and her solo Carnegie Hall debut at 23, and has since gone on to win numerous awards as well as perform in some of the world's most prestigious concert halls.

== Biography ==
Poghosyan's music studies began in her native Yerevan, Armenia, in School of the Arts, No. 1, and later in Romanos Melikian College as well as Komitas State Conservatory. Her teachers in Armenia included Irina Gazarian, Vatche Umr-Shat, and Svetlana Dadyan. After moving to the United States in 1998, she received her BM, summa cum laude, from California State University, Northridge, under Professor Françoise Regnat, and her MM and D.M.A. degrees at the Manhattan School of Music, under the late Dr. Arkady Aronov, completing her D.M.A. in a record-breaking two years, with a thesis on Aram Khachaturian for Piano. Ms. Poghosyan is currently based in New York, where she teaches at her alma mater, the Manhattan School of Music on both the collegiate and pre-collegiate faculties. Her most notable student is Charlie Puth whom she taught in the Pre-College.

== Musical career ==
Poghosyan is an avid musician who has been described as "extraordinary" and "larger than life," and has performed in recitals at Carnegie Hall's Weill Recital Hall, Merkin Concert Hall, Steinway Hall, the Trinity Church, Wall Street Concerts at One series, the Beverly Hills Sundays at Two series, the Valley Committee for the Los Angeles Philharmonic, the Bach's Lunch Recital Series in California, the Young Artists International Peninsula Festival in California, and the International Keyboard Institute and Festival in New York.

In the fall of 2007, she organized and performed a three-recital concert series at the Yamaha Piano Salon titled Twentieth Century Piano Sonata. Recently, she helped organize the "Requiem and Resurrection" concert in commemoration of the 95th Anniversary of the Armenian Genocide at the Saint Vartan Armenian Cathedral in New York, where her performance of the Piano Sonata by Khachaturian received a standing ovation and was described as "jaw-dropping." The Armenian Mirror Spectator wrote "The three-movement Khachaturian Sonata—a rarely performed composition—is a real tour-de-force for the virtuoso pianist. Technically pristine, Ms. Poghosyan brought out the driven qualities of the outer movements, and the heart-rending beauty of the middle section."

A foremost interpreter of Khachaturian, Poghosyan "inhabited the music in all its stormy, turbulent depths, shattering staccato and ravishing sensuality, bringing her own unselfconscious sense of fun."

She has appeared as a soloist with numerous orchestras including the New West Symphony, Park Avenue Chamber Symphony Orchestra, Musica Bella Symphony Orchestra, the CSUN Symphony, and the Kokolo Ensemble, and the Greater Newburgh Symphony Orchestra, whose music director Dr. Choe described Ms. Poghosyan as "an audience magnet" and "a born performer." She has participated in the master classes of distinguished artists such as Alicia de Larrocha, Claude Frank, Jon O'Connor, and Jerome Rose.

Poghosyan is the winner of the New West Symphony Discovery Artists Competition, the Thousand Islands International Piano Competition, CSUN Symphony Concerto Competition, the Artists International Auditions and was a top prize winner in the Los Angeles International Liszt Piano Competition, Five Towns Music and Arts Competition, and the Arno Babajanian Piano Competition. Ms. Poghosyan is also the recipient of scholarships from the National Academy of Recording Arts and Sciences, the Glendale Symphony Orchestra, the Armenian Students Association of America, AGBU, and the Jacob and Bronislaw Gimpel Foundation, and Manhattan School of Music.

Her solo CD of Aram Khachaturian's piano works and ballet transcriptions was released in the summer of 2014, on the Naxos label. Her album Rachmaninoff and Stravinsky was released September 14, 2019 on Centaur Records. Her album Folk Themes came out February 3, 2023 on Navona Records.
