= Konstantin Petrossian =

Konstantin Petrossian (Armenian: Կոնստանտին Պետրոսյան; Russian: Константин Петросян; born 12 August 1946 in Yerevan, Armenia) is a composer, pianist and conductor.

Petrossian graduated from the Romanos Melikian Music College and then earned a master's degree in composition and musicology Komitas State Conservatory in Yerevan, where he graduated with a master's degree in composition and musicology. He taught harmony, theory, and chorale arrangement at Romanos Melikian Music College. For many years he was also conductor of the Armenian TV/Radio Orchestra, and director of the Armenian Music Center.

Petrossian is an Armenian composer of symphonic, choral, chamber, instrumental, and vocal music, sound tracks, and theater music. His works are performed, recorded and have been published worldwide. He is a member of the Composers Union of Armenia and is co-chair of its foreign relations department. He was on the Sacred Music Council of the Diocese of the Armenian Church of America (Eastern).

He is director of the Music Center Department for the Composers Union of Armenia, and the vice president of the Armenian Peace Fund. Since 1995 he has been the cultural and music director of Sts. Sahag and Mesrob Armenian Church in Providence, Rhode Island. In April 2006 he presented a special Concert of Armenian Sacred Music at the United Nations in New York City. He is also the president and artistic director of the Armenian Music Festival of Rhode Island, which was organized in 1997.

In 1997 he premiered his opera "Anoush" in concert with Rhode Island Philharmonic Orchestra. He became the music director and conductor of the Erevan Choral Society of Boston in 2009.

He is the conductor of the Armenian Chorale of Rhode Island, and the Armenian Chorale of greater Worcester, Massachusetts. He is also the president and artistic director of the Armenian Music Festival of Rhode Island.

== Awards ==
In 2013 he was awarded the Movses Khorenatsi Medal by the government of Armenia. In June 2014, he received the Armenian Church's Sts. Sahag and Mesrob Medal for distinguished service to the church and to Armenian culture. On September 23, 2022, by the Decree of the President of the Republic of Armenia Vahagn Khachaturyan, on the occasion of the Independence Day of the Republic of Armenia, maestro Konstantin Petrossian was awarded the honorary title of Distinguished Artist of the Republic of Armenia for his merits in the field of art.

== Compositions ==
Orchestral

- Symphonic Poem for Orchestra, 1971
- “Rechitative” for Symphony Orchestra, 1972
- Concert for Chamber Orchestra, 1973
- Variations for Flugelhorn and Orchestra, 1979
- Ballad for Guitar and Orchestra, 1980
- Prelude for Piano and String Orchestra, 1983
- Sonnet for Piano and Orchestra, dedicated to his lovely wife-Janna, 1987
- Three Pieces for Piano and Chamber Orchestra, 1990
- Contemplation for Piano and Orchestra, 1992
- Elegy for Piano and String Orchestra, 1992
- Rhapsody for String Orchestra, 1999
- Fantasy for Guitar and String Orchestra, 2012
- Vocalise for Cello and Symphony Orchestra, 2014

Choral

- Four Folk Songs for an a Cappella Choir, 1987
- “Chimes of the Homeland”, Cycle of 10 Folk Songs for an a Cappella Women's Choir, 2003
- Our New Armenia for Choir and Orchestra, lyrics by Aramayis Sahakyan, 2011

Chamber and solo instruments

- Trio for Flute, Bassoon and Piano, 1964
- String Quartet, 1967
- Woodwind Quintet N1, 1971
- Woodwind Quintet N2, 1987
- “Dialogues” for Violin and Cello, 1987
- Four Miniatures for String Quartet, 1990
- Duets for Guitar and Flutes, 2000
- Trio for Flute, Clarinet and Piano, 2002
- Nocturne for Violin and Piano, dedicated to memory of Edvard Baghdasaryan, 2014
- “Tamzara” for Marimba, 2016
- Vocalise for Oboe and Piano, 2016
- Serenade for Cello and Piano, 2016
- Octet for Trombones, 2017
- “For Lilit”, for Piano, dedicated to Lilit Artemyan, 2017
- Scherzo for Trumpet and Piano, 2019

Sonatas

- Sonata for Violin and Piano, 1965
- Sonata for Solo Viola, dedicated to Yuri Manukyan, 1978
- Sonata for Trombone and Piano, 1984
- Sonata for Trumpet and Piano, 1985
- Sonata for Solo Violin, dedicated to Victor Khachatryan, 1985
- Sonata for Bassoon and Piano, 1986
- Sonata for Clarinet and Piano, 1988
- Sonata for Viola and Piano, 1988
- Sonata for French Horn and Piano, 1997
- Sonata for Flute and Piano, 2004
- Sonata for Oboe and Piano, 2006
- Sonata for Solo Flute, dedicated to Artashes Grigoryan, 2014

Suitas

- Suite for Piano, 1979
- Suite for Flute and Clarinet, 1989
- Suite for Chamber Ensemble, 1996

Vocal cycles

- “In the Language of Nature”, Vocal Cycle for Bariton and Piano, lyrics by Garik Banduryan, 1974
- “The Call of Longing” Vocal Cycle for Soprano and Piano, lyrics by Silva Kaputikyan, 1976
- “Taghs” Vocal cycle for Baritone, Cello, Piano and Percussion instruments, lyrics by Petros Duryan, 1984
- “Monologue” Vocal Cycle for Soprano and Piano, lyrics by Razmik Davoyan, 1985

Compositions for Big Band

- Contemplation for Saxophone and Big Band, 1964
- Spring Sketch for Trumpet and Big Band, 1967
- “Garni” Piece for Big Band, 1976
- “Album Leaf”, for Big Band, 1977
- Awakening, for Big Band, 1978
- “Hot Afternoon”, for Big Band, 1978
- Again Spring, Piece for Trombone and Big Band, 1978
- Concert for Voice and Big Band, 1986
- “Gyumri” Piece for Big Band, dedicated to Hovhannes Avetisyan, 2018

Vocal Compositions

- Impromtu for Voice and Orchestra, 1968
- “My Generation” for Voice and Orchestra, lyrics by Garik Banduryan,1977
- “Cosmos” for Voice and Orchestra, lyrics by Aramayis Sahakyan, 1978
- “Do not Call” for Voice and Orchestra, lyrics by R. Luskene, 1978
- “It’s Time for my Spring” for Voice and Orchestra, lyrics by Kristophor Zakiyan, 1978
- “Faith of Love” for Voice and Orchestra, lyrics by Garik Banduryan, 1978
- “The Magic World” for Voice and Orchestra, lyrics by Alexey Vasilenko, 1979
- “Green May” for Voice and Orchestra, 1980
- “My Kapan” for Voice and Orchestra, lyrics by Garik Banduryan, 1983
- “I Rarely Dreamed of you”, for Voice and Orchestra, lyrics by Lyudmila Govryushina, 1983
- “Armenia” for Voice, Choir and Orchestra, lyrics by Nansen Mikayelyan, 1984
- “Confession” for Voice and Orchestra, lyrics by Arshavir Torosyan, 1984
- “Dream my Love” for Voice and Orchestra, lyrics by Arshavir Torosyan, 1984
- “New Year” for Voice and Orchestra, lyrics by Suren Muradyan, 1985
- “Two Tickets”, for Voice and Orchestra, lyrics by Mikhail Plyatskovski, 1988
- “For Armenian Children for Voice”, Choir and Orchestra, lyrics by Gevorg Karapetyan, 1989
- “Forgotten Light” for Voice and Orchestra, lyrics by NarineHarutyunyan, 1990
- Mother of God for Choir and Symphony Orchestra, lyrics by Archbishop Nerses Pozapalyan, 1991
- “Knights of Vardan” for Voice and Orchestra, lyrics by Arshavir Torosyan,1991
- “Etchmiadzin” for Voice and Piano, lyrics by Hovhannes Hovhannisyan, 1995
- “Heart of our Nation, Ararat”, for Voice, Choir and Symphony Orchestra, lyrics by Arshavir Torosyan, 1997
- “Evening Melody” for Voice, Choir and Symphony Orchestra, lyrics by Rev. Fr. MesropTashchyan, 1998
- Vocalise for Voice, Choir and Orchestra, 2013
- “Haykazyan Nation” for Voice, Choir and Orchestra, lyrics by Gevorg Karapetyan, 2013
- “Love Fairy Tale”, for Voice and Orchestra, lyrics by Nushik Mikaelyan, 2016
- “To the Fighters of Artsakh”, for Voice and Orchestra, lyrics by Arshavir Torosyan, 2017

Music For Movies and Theatrical Presentations

- D/F “Tigran Petrosyan - Champion”, 1963
- D/F “Armenia”, 1966
- “Blue Deers” TV Theatrical Presentation, director – Knarik Sargsyan, 1986
