= Vahram Babayan =

Armenian musician

Vahram Ohani Babayan (born 1948) is a contemporary Armenian composer, pianist, and music theorist. He has composed a variety of music, including opera and ballet, symphonies, chamber music, and vocal compositions.

Babayan graduated from Yerevan State Conservatory. He now serves as Vice President of the Armenian Musical Assembly.

He wrote his first serious composition at the age of 6, and at the age of 9 he wrote a Symphony for String Orchestra. In 1968 Vahram Babayan entered Yerevan State Conservatory after Komitas. In 1972 he graduated from the faculty of piano (class of Professor Vahe Aharonyan), and in 1973: from the faculty of composition (class of Professor Grigor Yeghiazaryan). Since 1973 Vahram Babayan has been a member of USSR Composer's Union. In 1975, during the competition dedicated to the 100th anniversary of A. Isahakyan, V. Babayan was awarded a prize for his Second Symphony based on the poem “Abu-Lala Mahari”. In 1982 he was awarded the title of the laureate of Lenin Komsomol Prize of Armenia. In 2009 he was also a laureate of “Vahan Teqeyan” International Prize awarded by “Teqeyan” Cultural union (for the Leipzig String Quartet). In the same year his composition Hymne for piano and string orchestra was awarded the prize for the best musical composition by the World Armenian Congress and Union of Armenians of Russia. In 2011 Vahram Babayan was awarded the gold medal by the RA Ministry of Culture. V. Babayan composes in all styles: he has written 6 operas: “The Stranger” (1970), “Beethoven’s Letters” (1977), “Hamlet” (1990) “Liramlarim” (2002), “Song about Love and Beauty” (2003), “The Forty Days of Musa Dagh” (2004), 4 ballets: “Pygmalion” (1975), “Pan” (1977), “Towards the Light” (1995, the premiere was in Baltimore, USA, in 1995), “The Little Prince” (1998); 2 oratorios: “Christ Speaks” (1991), “from Christ’s Life” (1995); 9 symphonies: (1964, 1968, 1972, 1977, 1981, 1985, 1988, 1998, 2009); 2 symphonic poems; numerous concerts (5 for piano); 3 chamber symphonies; a symphony for percussive musical instruments, 7 string quartets, a piano quartet, wind quintet, a piano trio, numerous sonatas for different instruments (7 for piano), music for children, etc. Vahram Babayan's works have been presented in 35 countries (the US, Germany, Austria, Finland, England, Japan, Argentina, Italy, France, Switzerland, Hungary, Romania, Russia, etc.) at various prestigious festivals and concerts. Vahram Babayan, being a brilliant pianist, has performed in more than 10 countries. His works are notable for psychological depth, unique world view and philosophy. His early period is characterized by avant-garde standpoint, later the composer is inclined to neo-romantism, and at a more mature stage – to expressionism. Since 1998 music festivals have been organized in Armenia named after Vahram Babayan (the first festival was in 1998 and was dedicated to the 50th anniversary of the composer, the second festival was in 2005 dedicated to the 50th anniversary of his creative activity). Vahram Babayan's works have been published in France, England, Russia and Armenia. He is the author of various articles raising issues related to music. At present the composer is a lecturer at Yerevan State Conservatory after Komitas.
