= Raffi Besalyan =

Raffi Besalyan (Japanese):ラフィ ベサリアン） (Russian: Раффи Бесалян) (Armenian: Րաֆֆի Բեսալյան)
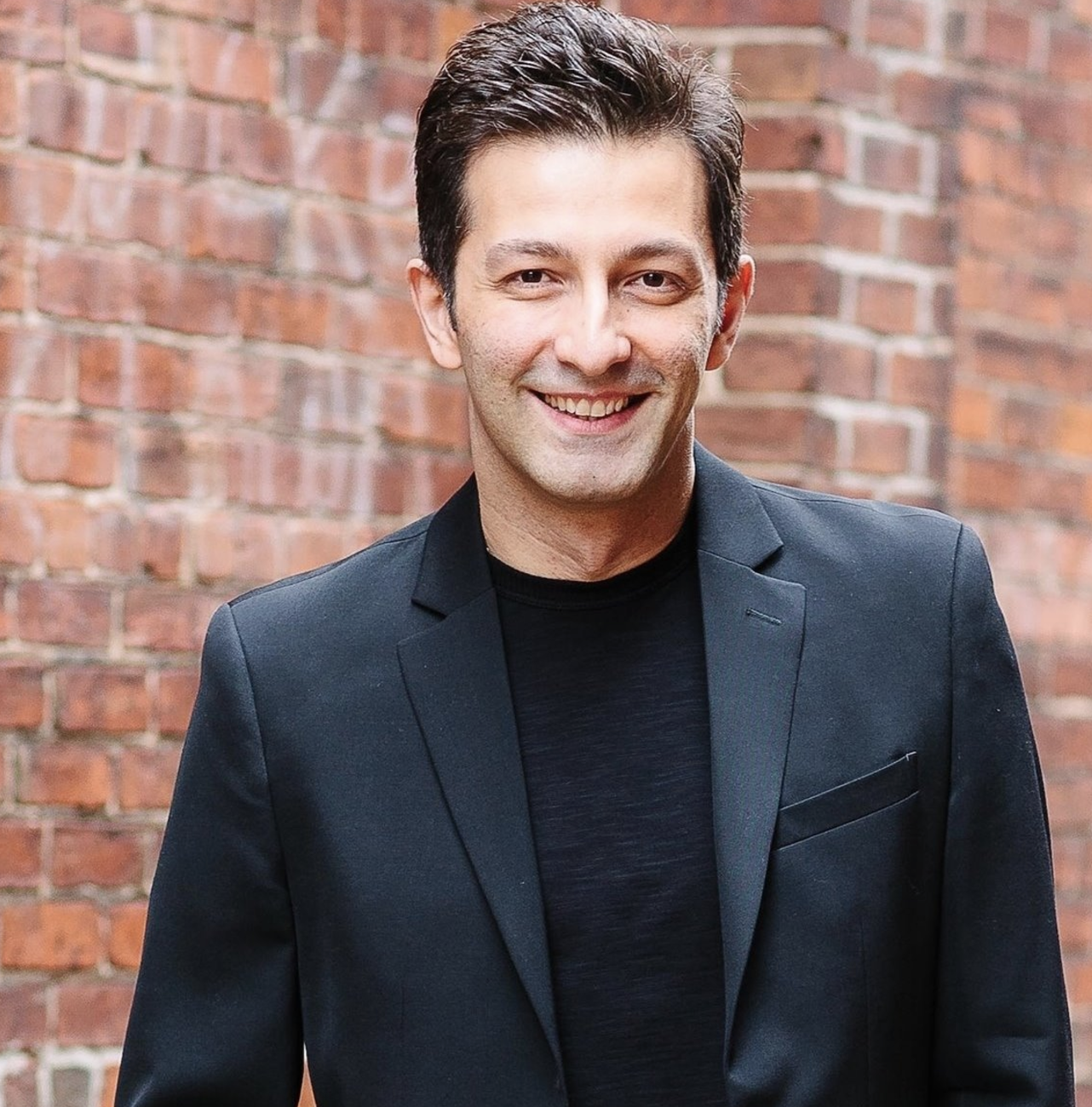

Background information
- Born: Yerevan, Armenia
- Genres: Classical
- Occupations: Concert pianist Educator
- Instrument: Piano
- Website: www.raffibesalyan.com

Raffi Besalyan (Armenian: Րաֆֆի Բէսալյան, born in Yerevan) is an Armenian-American Concert Pianist. Besalyan studied at the Tchaikovsky Special Music School for Gifted Children in Yerevan, and received Bachelor's, Master's, and Doctor of Musical Arts degrees from Yerevan State Musical Conservatory. He received an additional master's degree from Rowan University, and studied at the Manhattan School of Music with legendary American pianist Byron Janis.

Besalyan has won top prizes in several national and international competitions. Among them are MTNA National Competition, Josef Hofmann International Piano Competition, Frinna Awerbuch International Competition, and Artists International Competition in New York.

Besalyan made his New York Recital Debut in Carnegie Hall in 2003 to high critical acclaim. He regularly performs throughout North America, Europe, Russia and Asia. His performances have taken him to a number of prestigious venues, including Carnegie and Merkin Hall (New York City), the Kennedy Center (Washington, D.C.), Orchestra Hall (Chicago), Atlanta Symphony Hall, Moscow Conservatory's Rachmaninoff Hall and Maly Zal (Russia), and Izumi and Phoenix Hall in Japan. Besalyan tours Japan on a yearly basis for adjudication (PTNA, Osaka International Music Competition), master classes, and concerts. He is represented in Japan by Tokyo IMC, MAS management, and is a Guest Artist/Teacher of The Takatsuki Music Teacher's Association of Osaka and Yamaha. He was formerly a professor at Rowan University in New Jersey, University of Wisconsin–Stevens Point. and Georgia State University where he served as the keyboard area coordinator.

== Concert reviews ==
In 1998, Armenian Reporter International, said “Standing ovation and cries of “Bravo” and “Encore” went to pianist Raffi Besalyan... mesmerized the audience with his gracious, delicate yet powerful presentation of Rachmaninoff’s Concerto No.3.”

In a 2008 Chopin Magazine review, critic Senshi Yokohara praised Raffi Besalyan’s performance at Izumi Hall for its "lucid and beautiful sound," expressive interpretations of Rachmaninoff and Liszt, and imaginative renditions of works by Komitas and Gershwin. Yokohara described Besalyan as a “true heir of the Russian pianism tradition, like Horowitz.”

In 2008, Sotokuan Press reviewed the concert at Osaka, Japan and stated:“The flow of Baghdassarian's Prelude instantly changed the color and the air of Izumi Hall. The entire hall was devoured by Besalyan’s glorious touch and crystalline sound...Besalyan was not just playing the piano, he was creating wonderful art, and treated the piano with his love for the music. ”

In 2008, the Tribune Gazette stated: "I attended the piano recital of Armenian-born pianist Raffi Besalyan in Clintonville on April 16. What a splendid interpretation of Russian composer Sergei Rachmaninoff – I was totally mesmerized by Mr. Besalyan’s dynamic performance. The rest of his repertoire, Liszt’s Mephisto Waltz, Chopin’s Etudes and Gershwin’s Rhapsody in Blue were played with extreme perfection, Mr. Besalyan really let “the piano speak.”

In 2014, Detroit Performs did a review and stated: "The maniacal Mephisto Waltz # 1 by Liszt closed the program. Its technical difficulties were negotiated with aplomb, but what a jaw-dropper! Face it, the piece is mostly empty bombast, but it is so much fun, and it displays a pianist’s exceptional skills. Raffi Besalyan has a surfeit of them, stamina and strength foremost in this opus."

== Recordings ==
In 2012 Besalyan established himself as an award-winning recording artist, receiving international accolades for his album “Dance, Drama, Decadence” (IMC Music, Japan). The album received the prestigious Jun-Tokusen Award from The Record Geijutsu, Japan’s leading classical music magazine, and was chosen as the “Classical Album of the Month” by Mainichi Shinbun, one of Japan's largest newspapers. “Dance, Drama, Decadence” was selected as the “Best New Release of the Month” by Tokyo FM, a prominent radio channel, where the CD premiered in its entirety. In addition, Ongaku no Tomo of Japan recommended and archived the CD as a study reference for music students and professors alike.

Fanfare Magazine featured Besalyan in an extensive interview followed by rave reviews of the album, and another glowing review appeared in American Record Guide. Besalyan was also interviewed by Wisconsin Public Radio's Norman Gilliland on The Midday, and Dance, Drama, Decadence was aired on WPR (Madison, WI) and KHPR (Honolulu, HI).

The album features virtuoso works by Rachmaninoff, Liszt, and Ravel and premiere recordings of colorful folkloristic pieces by Armenian composers Komitas and Baghdassarian. Besalyan is also featured on “Bach-Busoni Edition, Vol.I” for Koch International Classics.

Besalyan's first critically acclaimed recording of solo works by S. Rachmaninoff and A. Babajanian for the Grammy Award-Winning record label Sono Luminus entitled "The Return" was released in March 2015, and is distributed by Naxos. “The Return” has been aired on several radio stations across the U.S. and Canada, such as the NPR, WGBH Boston, WRUV Vermont, the SiriusXM Washington D.C., Wisconsin Public Radio, The King FM Seattle, WFMT Chicago, The Grand FM Ontario and CBC Public Radio. WQXR, New York's premiere classical radio station featured the album as the New and Noteworthy Release of September 2015.

In 2021, Besalyan's second solo piano album "The Sound of Black & White" for Sono Luminus was released. The album includes a world premiere recording of Oscar Levant’s jazzy Sonatina. "The Sound of Black & White" was featured on six playlists by Apple Classical Music, and was a nominee for the Album of the Year- Solo Piano on Native DSD, selected by highly qualified reviewers from hundreds submitted by 80 record labels. "The Sound of Black & White" is frequently aired on NPR affiliated radio channels.

== Publications ==
- Eduard Baghdasarian, 24 Preludes for Piano (Edited and with fingerings by Raffi Besalyan); Publisher: Muse Press, Japan; Published on November 29, 2021
