= Avet Terterian =

Armenian composer (1929–1994)

Avet Terterian PAU
- Born: July 29, 1929; Baku, Transcaucasian SFSR
- Died: December 11, 1994 (aged 65); Yekaterinburg, Russia
- Occupation: Composer

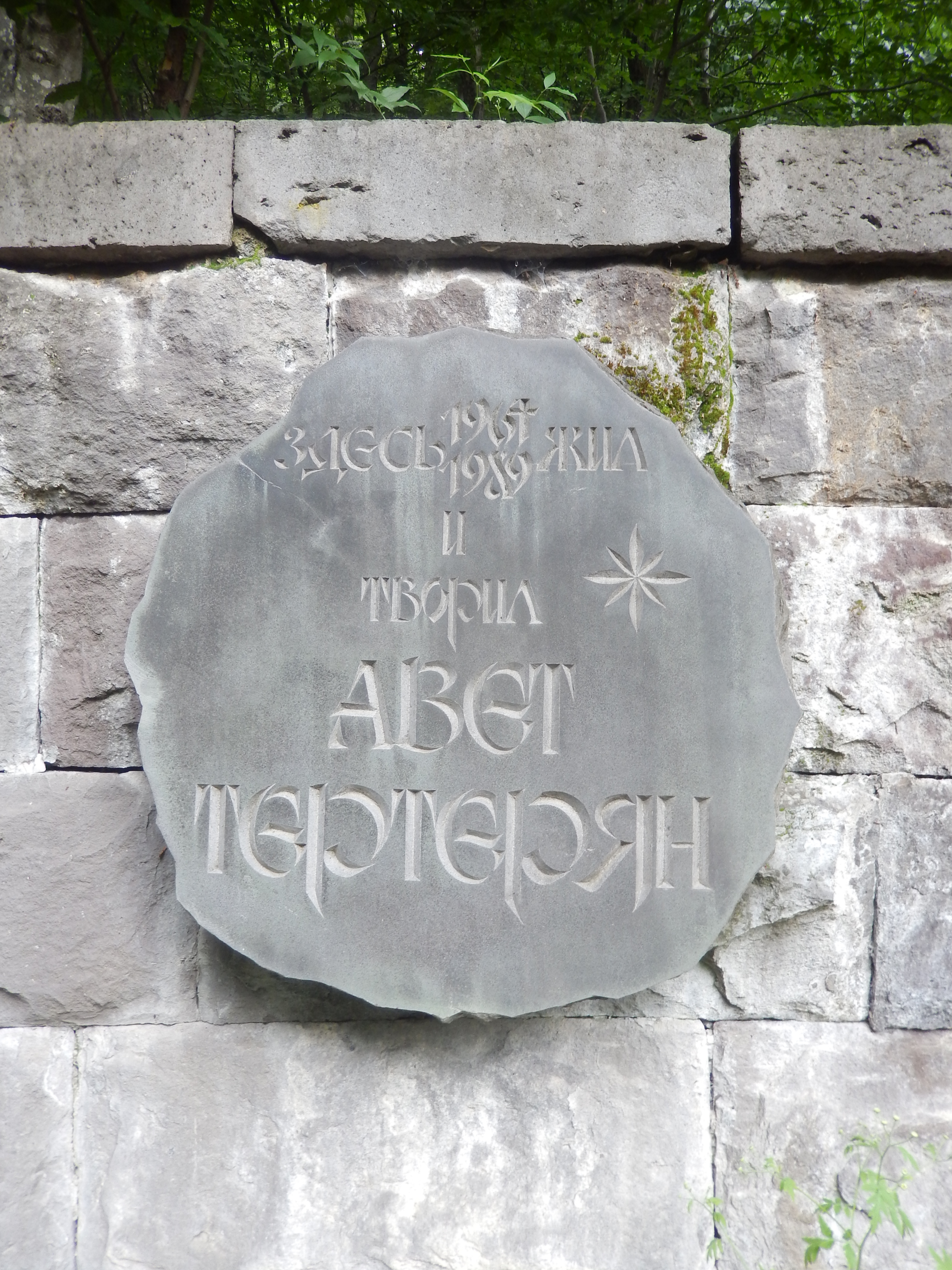
Avet Terteryan Plaque in Dilijan

Alfred Roubenovich "Avet" Terterian (also Terteryan) (Armenian: Ալֆրեդ "Ավետ" Տերտերյան, July 29, 1929 – December 11, 1994) was an Armenian composer, awarded the Konrad Adenauer Prize.

Terterian was a friend and colleague of Giya Kancheli, Konstantin Orbelyan, and Tigran Mansurian. Dmitri Shostakovich praised Terterian as "very talented" and "with great future" in one of his letters, published by his friend Isaak Glikman, having heard a recording of Terterian's works at Armenia's "House of Composers" summer resort in Dilijan, Armenia.

== Life and career ==
Terterian was born in Baku to Armenian parents. He studied at the Music Academy in Baku from 1948, and moved to the Romanos-Melikian Music Academy in 1951. He studied composition at the Komitas State Conservatory in Yerevan from 1952. His works in the late 1950s and early 1960s follow the path of Khachaturian, but his 1967 opera The Ring of Fire announced a change of musical language which included atonality and the use of electronics. Terterian composed eight (completed) symphonies which cover his compositional career from 1969 until his death, several of which are recorded, two operas and several chamber works.

He was Executive Secretary of the Armenian Composers’ Union from 1960 to 1963, and Chairman of the Music Department at the Armenian Cultural Ministry from 1970 and 1974. He joined Yerevan Conservatory as a professor in 1985. In 1989, he moved to the village of Ayrivank, located on the western shore of Lake Sevan, Gegharkunik region of Armenia. In 1991 he was made a People's Artist and in 1993 awarded the Khachaturian Prize.

Yekaterinburg's annual music festival is named after Terterian.

Giya Kancheli's work Styx, written for solo viola, chorus, and orchestra is a farewell to his friends Terterian and Alfred Schnittke, whose names are sung by the choir during the work.

Terterian's son, Dr. Ruben Terterian, was a professor of music in Samborondón, Ecuador, until his death in January 2020; and former prorector at the Komitas State Conservatory of Yerevan.

His most notable student is Vache Sharafyan.

== List of works ==
- 1948 – “The Nightingale and the Rose.” For voice and piano. Words by A. Lushkina. Dedication “Angela Harutyunyan.”
- 1950 – Prelude for piano.
- 1951 – Piece for violin and piano. Dedication “Georgy Adzhemyan”.
- 1953 – “Dnepr”. For bass-baritone and piano. Words by Shevchenko. Russian translation M. Isakovsky, Armenian transition A. Poghosyan.
- 1953 – “The Lonely Tree”. For a mixed choir а cappella. Words by O. Shiraz.
- 1954 – Piece for cello and piano. Dedication: “Medea Abrahamyan”.
- 1954 – “Every night in my garden.” For voice and piano. Words by A. Isahakyan.
- 1954 – “Willow”. For soprano and piano. Words by A. Isahakyan.
- 1955 – Sonata for cello and piano. In three parts
- 1956 – “How nice is here.” Impromptu for voice and piano. Words by Tolstoy.
- 1957 – “Looking through the dates.” For soprano and piano. Words by S. Shchipachev.
- 1957 – “Call, I will come.” For tenor or soprano, and piano. Words by H. Shiraz.
- 1957 – “Motherland”. Vocal-symphonic cycle for soprano, baritone and symphony orchestra. The words of the songs are poems by H. Shiraz (parts 1, 2, 3, 5) and H. Tumanyan (Part 4). In five parts Dedication “Edward Mirzoyan”.
- 1958 – “Songs” For choir and brass band. Words by E. Manucharyan. Dedication “Pupils music boarding school.”
- 1959 – “Pop Song”. For voice and big band.
- 1960 – “The Revolution.” Vocal-symphonic cycle for soprano, baritone and symphony orchestra. The words of the songs are poems by E. Charents. Five parts.
- 1962 – “Come.” For voice and big band. Word by V. Harutyunyan.
- 1962 – “Blue Eyes.” For voice and big band. Words by H. Ghukasyan.
- 1963 – String Quartets. For two violins, viola and cello (C major). In two parts. Dedication “Irina Tigranova”.
- 1963 – “You are the only to know.” For voice and big band. Word by A. Ghukasyan.
- 1964 – “In the golden field.” For baritone and piano. Words by O. Shiraz.
- 1964 – “Maybe tomorrow.” For voice and big band. Words by A. Verdyan.
- 1964 – “I am waiting for you again.” For voice and big band. Words by A. Verdyan.
- 1964 – “Autumn Blues”. For voice and big band. Words by A. Verdyan. Dedication “Anatoliy Nikiforovich Yar-Kravchenko”.
- 1964 – “Go Dance”. For voice and big band. Words by A. Verdyan.
- 1965 – “Lullaby to my city.” For and big band. Words by A. Verdyan.
- 1965 – “I do not believe!” For voice and big band..Words by A. Verdyan.
- 1967 – “Ring of Fire”. Opera in two acts, eight scenes. Libretto by V. Shahnazaryan on a story by B. Lavrenev “Forty first” and verses of E. Charents.
- 1967 – “Sharakan.” For mixed choir and symphony orchestra (Episode from the opera "Ring of Fire").
- 1967 – “How do you know.” For and big band. Words by A. Verdyan.
- 1968 – “A woman with green eyes.” For mezzo-soprano and piano. Words by G. Emin (Russian text: Yevgeny Yevtushenko).
- 1968 – “Pop Song”. For voice and big band.
- 1969 – Symphony. For brass, percussion, piano, organ and bass guitar. In four parts. Dedication: “Ruben Borisovich Terteryan.”
- 1972 – Second Symphony. For full symphony orchestra, male voices and mixed choir. In three parts. Dedication: “Carmen Josephovna Terteryan”.
- 1972 – Symphonic picture № 1. For full symphony orchestra.
- 1974 – “Fanfare”. For wind and percussion instruments.
- 1974 – Music for two pianos, trumpets, percussion and violins. скрипок. В четырех частях. In 4 parts.
- 1975 – Third Symphony. For full symphony orchestra, duduk and zurna. In three parts. Dedication “Herman R. Terteryan”.
- 1975 – Symphonic picture №2. For full symphony orchestra.
- 1975 – Music for winds and percussion instruments, electronic synthesizer and piano.
- 1976 – Fourth Symphony. For full symphony orchestra. Dedication “David Khanjyan.”
- 1977 – “Hymn”. Cantata for mixed choir and symphony orchestra. Words by G. Emin.
- 1978 – Fifth Symphony. For full symphony orchestra, kyamancha and large bells. Dedication “Gennady Rozhdestvensky."
- 1979 – “Monologues of Richard III”. The ballet in two parts. Libretto: H. Kaplanyan and V. Galstyan on Shakespeare’s tragedy Richard III.
- 1981 – Sixth Symphony. For Chamber Orchestra, Chamber Choir and nine phonograms with recording of groups of full symphony orchestra, choirs, harpsichords and large bells. Dedication “Irina G. Tigranova”.
- 1981 – “ A boy and a girl playing” Romance for voice and chamber orchestra. Words by A. Isahakyan.
- 1984 – “The Earthquake”. Opera in two parts. Libretto: Hertha Shteher, Avet Terteryan, based on the novel by Heinrich von Kleist “Earthquake in Chile” (in German).
- 1985 – The choir and a cappella. For a mixed choir a cappella.
- 1987 – Seventh Symphony. For full symphony orchestra, dap and tape recording. Dedication “Alexander Lazarev.”
- 1989 – Eighth Symphony. For full symphony orchestra, two voices (soprano) and phonograms. Dedication “Murad Annamamedov.”
- 1991 – String Quartets №2. For two violins, viola and cello.
- 1994 – Ninth Symphony (unfinished). For full symphony orchestra, choir and tape recordings.

=== Music for films ===
- 1973 – “Chronicle of Yerevan Days”. Feature film. Film-maker F. Dovlatyan. Production studio “Armenfilm” n. Hamo Beknazaryan.
- 1985 – “The rider, who was expected” (“Master thief"). The co-author V. Rubashevsky. Art telefilm in two runs. Directed by D. Kesayants.

Terterian's music was used in many films, including:

- 1988 – “Our Armored Train” (film-maker M. Ptashuk, Minsk, Belarus)
  - "Interpretation of Dreams” (film-maker L. Saakyants, Yerevan, Armenia);
- 1989 – “The creative biography of Ernst Neizvestny and music of A. Terteryan” (film-maker Bondarev, Moscow, USSR);
- 1990 – “Public Enemy” (cond. L. Maryagin, Moscow, USSR);
  - Qamin unaynutyan (Wind of Oblivion)
- 1991 – “Vox Clamantis in Deserto” (Dzayn barbaro ... , film-maker Vigen Chaldranyan, Yerevan, Armenia)
  - “The Way of Kings” (film-maker E. Shiffers, Leningrad, USSR),
  - “Return to the promised land” (film-maker A. Khachatryan, Yerevan, Armenia);
- 1993 – “The old gods” (film-maker A. Kadzhvoryan, Yerevan, Armenia);
- 1993–1995 – film director and journalist T. Paskaleva about events in Nagorno-Karabakh (NKR)
- 1994 – “The Last Station” (film-maker A. Khachatryan, Yerevan, Armenia);
- 1996 – “Our Father” (film-maker A. Kadzhvoryan, Yerevan, Armenia);
- 1996 – “Bread of Rage” (film-maker A. Kadzhvoryan, Yerevan, Armenia);
- 2003 – Vaveragrogh (Documentarist)
- 2005 – Poeti veradardze (Return of the Poet)
- 2009 – “Becoming” (cond. G. Frutyunyan, Yerevan, Armenia), “On the boundary", film-maker A. Khachaturyan, Yerevan, Armenia;
- 2010 – “To Ararat” (cond. T. Khzmalyan, Yerevan, Armenia).

=== As actor ===
- Dzayn barbaro ... (1991)

== Literature ==
- Terteryan, Ruben; Terteryan, Avet (2015). Conversations with Avet Terteryan: = Besedy s Avetom Terterjanom. Ekaterinburg Moskva: TXT. ISBN 978-5-7525-3035-7.
