= Heghine Rapyan =

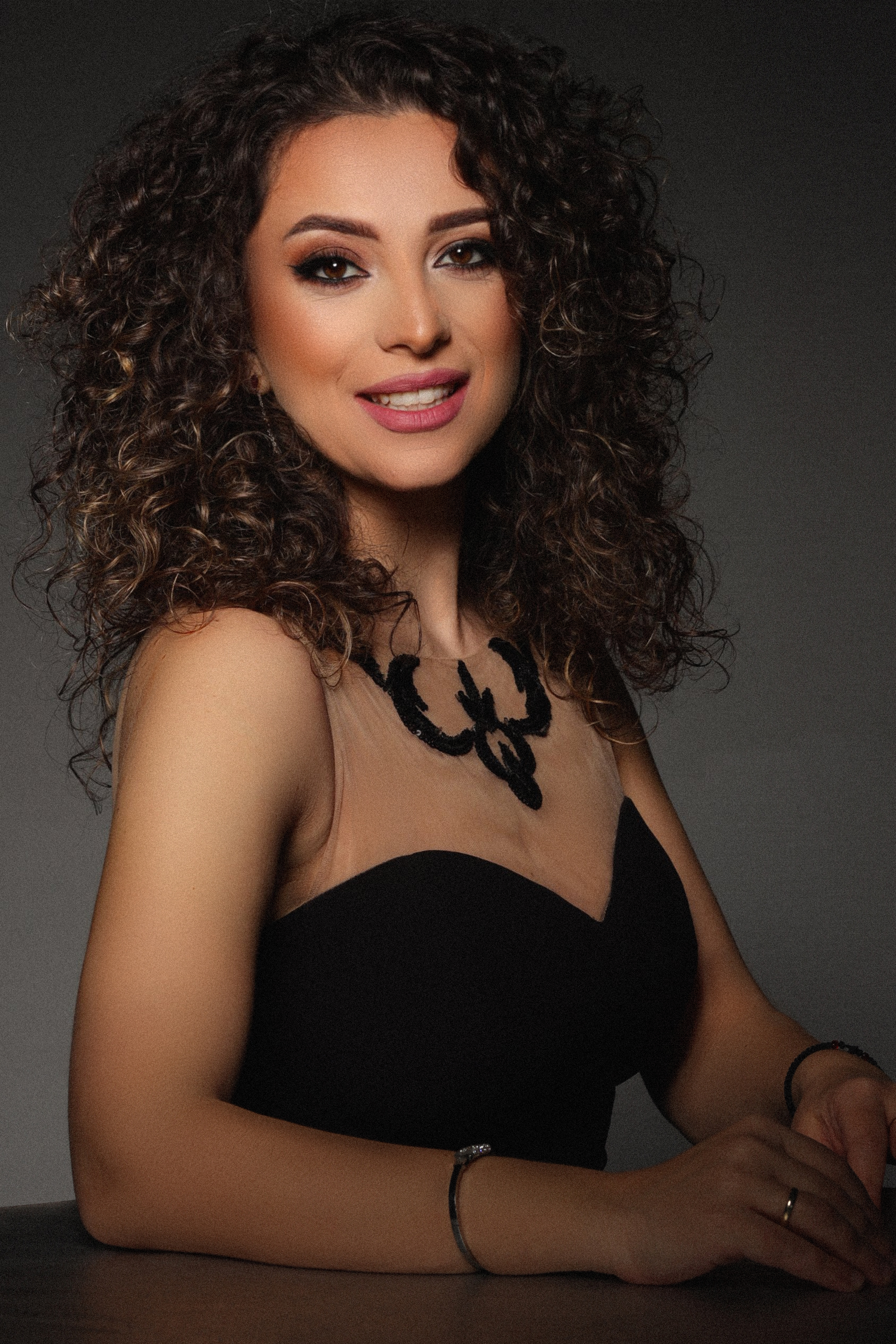

Background information
- Born: April 24, 1985 (age 40); Kamo, Armenian SSR, Soviet Union (now Gavar, Armenia)
- Occupations: Musician, pianist
- Instrument: Piano
- Years active: 1995–present
- Website: piano.am

Heghine Rapyan (born April 24, 1985 in Gavar, Armenia) is a pianist of Armenian origin. She is an honors graduate (diploma with distinction) of the “Komitas” State Conservatory, Yerevan, Armenia and the Mozarteum University Salzburg, Austria.

== Early life and education ==
Born in Gavar, Armenia, Heghine Rapyan demonstrated an early aptitude for music. She began playing the piano at the age of three and received her initial training at the local music school under A. Zagaryan. She later studied with Armen Babakhanian at the Tchaikovsky Music School and the Yerevan State Conservatory, graduating with honors. Seeking to refine her craft, she pursued advanced studies at the Mozarteum University Salzburg, Austria. There, she studied under esteemed professors Peter Lang and Rolf Plagge for piano performance and Imre Rohmann and Tünde Kurucz for chamber music. In 2017, she graduated with distinction, earning a Master of Arts (MA) degree.

At sixteen, Heghine Rapyan embarked on her first international concert tour, performing in Germany, Austria, and the Netherlands. She gained early recognition after winning the Kawai Artist Prize at the Armenian Legacy International Piano Competition in 2001. Her victory at the Stephan Elmas International Piano Competition further cemented her reputation as an emerging talent.

== Performance and Recordings ==
Heghine has performed at prestigious venues, including Megaron Hall in Athens, Thessaloniki Concert Hall, Rudolf-Oetker-Halle in Bielefeld, Theatre Politeama Cicily. She has also captivated audiences across Asia, with performances at the Beijing Concert Hall, Poly Shanghai City Theater, and Shenzhen Concert Hall.

Her latest album, The Soul of Smyrna, was released in April 2023 by Solo Musica/Naxos. The recording received critical acclaim, with BBC Music Magazine describing it as a sensational discovery. The American Record Guide named it the Best CD of 2023.

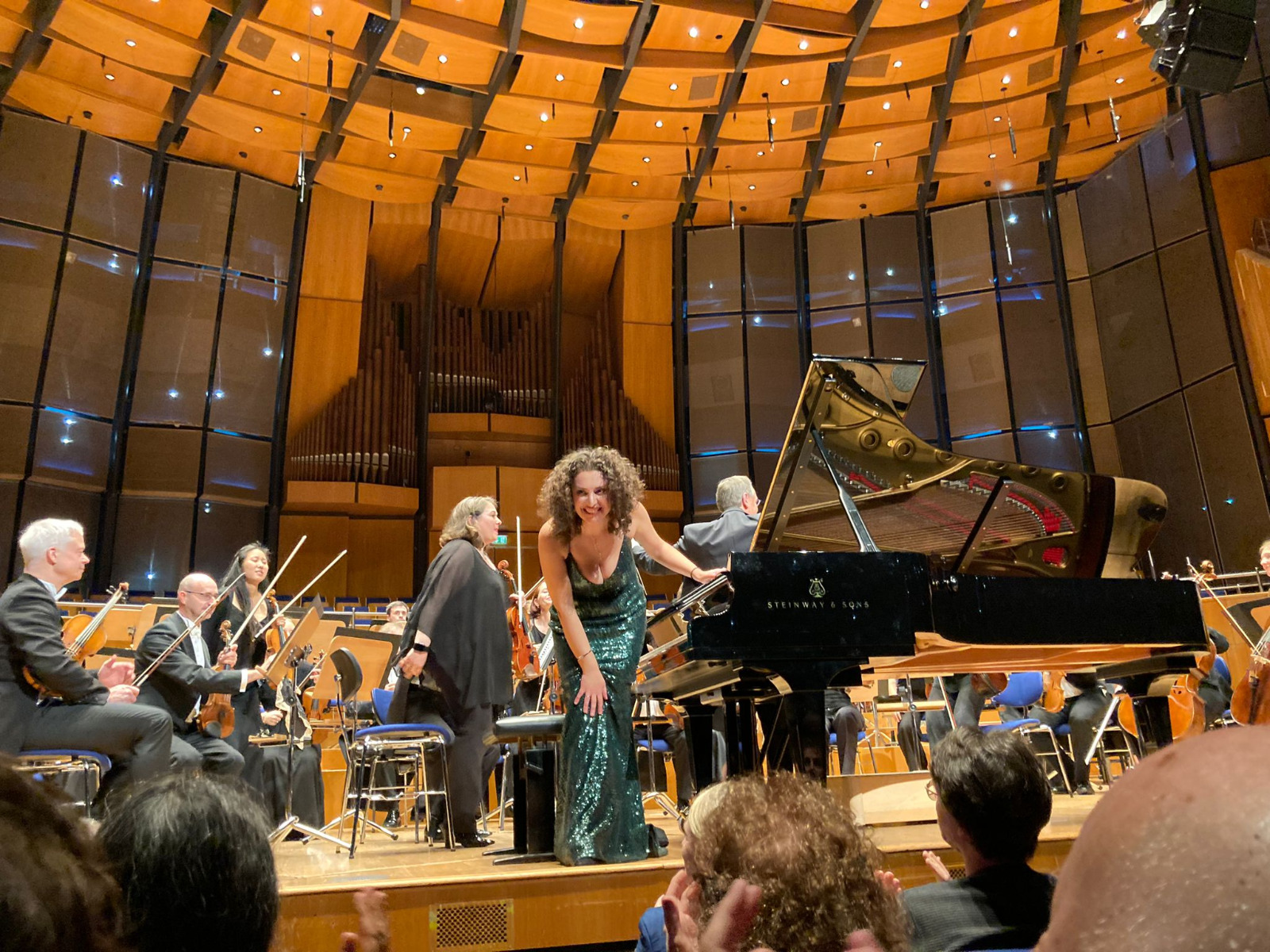
Heghine is performing Florence B. Price's Piano Concerto at the Tonhalle Düsseldorf

Her interpretations have been highlighted in major classical music publications and radio stations EU, including WDR and hr2 in Germany and SRF in Switzerland.

Rapyan has performed as a soloist with renowned orchestras, including the Armenian Philharmonic Orchestra, Armenian National Chamber Orchestra, the Female Symphony Orchestra of Austria, Salzburg University Orchestra, and Camerata Louis Spohr Düsseldorf. Her collaboration with conductor Hisayoshi Inoue led to celebrated performances of Liszt's Piano Concerto No. 2, which was broadcast on Tokyo National Radio. In October 2024, she made her debut at the Tonhalle Düsseldorf, performing Florence B. Price's Piano Concerto.

== Awards and recognition ==
Throughout her career, Heghine Rapyan has received numerous accolades, winning international competitions in Armenia, Italy, and Greece. Notable awards include first prize at the Stephan Elmas International Piano Competition and second price at Maria Cherogiorgou International Piano Competition in Athens.

She has studied under eminent musicians such as Pavel Gililov, Klaus Hellwig, and Jura Margulis. A pivotal moment in her artistic development was her encounter with Austrian pianist Ingrid Haebler, whose mentorship significantly influenced her musical interpretation and style.

In 2008 she was offered a place for Postgraduate study in “Mozarteum” University in Salzburg / Austria, where she studied under the guidance of Prof. Peter Lang and latterly Prof. Rolf Plagge. In addition, since 2011, Heghine has been doing research for the biography of an unknown Austrian woman composer of the late 19th / early 20th century.

She has participated in Masterclasses of Alexander Banduryansky, Jerome Rose, Jura Margulis, Robert Levin, Klauss Hellwig, Ludmil Angelov and Arnulf von Arnim.

Heghine Rapyan has given recitals since 2001 in the Netherlands, Germany, Austria, Italy, Greece, Russia, Armenia and Saudi Arabia and performed as a soloist with the Armenian Philharmonic Orchestra and Armenian National Chamber Orchestra.

She is an award winner of national and international piano competitions in Armenia, Moldavia, Greece and Italy. She is a recipient of the special prize of Kawai “most promising talent” and has received study scholarships.

In 2025, Rapyan made her debut as a composer with the album The Untouchable, presenting a bold and deeply personal artistic statement that expands her musical identity beyond interpretation into original creation. The album features eight compositions for solo piano and digital orchestra.

A formative turning point in Heghine's artistic development came through her close encounter with the legendary Austrian pianist Ingrid Haebler in Salzburg. Following Haebler’s passing, Rapyan is recognized as a cultural inheritor of her.
