= Vardan Sardaryan =

Vardan Sardaryan Վարդան Սարդարյան
- Origin: Armenia
- Occupation(s): composer, music producer, pianist
- Instrument: piano

Vardan Sardaryan (Armenian: Վարդան Սարդարյան; Armenian pronunciation [var’ta:n sar’da’rjan]; born September 29, 1962) is an Armenian composer, music producer and a pianist. His works range from commercial songs and instrumentals to film soundtracks, anthems and large-scale compositions, music for documentaries and TV programs. The composer's music has been used for different openings, competitions, radio and TV commercials, etc. He is the artistic director of two variety bands within the scope of Armenian National Show project.

== Early life ==
Vardan Sardaryan started his career as a pianist at a very early age. When Vardan was 6 years old, he had already written two songs. After studying music in local music school and then music college for 11 years, Vardan was successfully accepted to Yerevan Komitas State Conservatory, where he studied in the class of Honorary Artist of Soviet Armenia, Professor Anna Ambakumyan for the next 5 years. During his studies, he participated in different local and international competitions as a pianist. At the same time, Vardan Sardaryan would attend composition classes and develop his already recognized composing skills. After graduating from the Conservatory, Vardan Sardaryan was invited to work as a school director in Kapan music school. During those years the musician also established his own chamber group “Syune”, which would exclusively perform his own works.

== Music career ==
The year of 1996 was a turning point in Vardan's career when he was invited to work as a Musical Editor at the International Association ‘Dobroye Serdtse’ in Moscow, Russia. He worked with famous Russian singers such as Irina Allegrova, Valery Leontiev, famous Russian composer Alexey Garnizov, “Todes” dance group, famous Russian dancer M. Isambayev, famous Russian actress comedian Clara Novikova (music arrangements for her plays), producer Nerses Hovhannisyan (Mosfilm) and others. Cooperation with these artists helped Vardan gain more experience and take his career as a songwriter/producer/arranger to the next level.

Upon his return to his home country in 1999 he established new connections and received different offers as a composer. He wrote music for “Gavrosh” (a play based on Victor Hugo’s “Les Miserables”) in ‘Patani Handisates’ State Theatre in Yerevan, Armenia. Soon he got a different offer from “Versus” film studio in Yerevan to write music for the documentary “Mistery of Minas” (a film about famous Armenian painter Minas Avetisyan), a project with Ara Shirinyan as the film producer. The composer also signed a contract with Shoghakat TV Company in Yerevan, Armenia as well as “Hayastan” All-Armenian Fund to work as a composer.

In 2004, the design package of Shoghakat TV Company won Grand Prix at PIXEL Festival of Digital Technologies and Computer Art held in Moscow May 24–26. And the credits for original music score for the whole package belong to Vardan Sardaryan. Vardan Sardaryan is also a songwriter (author of more than 100 songs), producer and music arranger.

In the year of 2000, Vardan started working with Armenian singer Mister X as the Music Director for his band. In addition to rehearsals and tours with the band, he was also working on the arrangements for the singer’s studio and concert albums. One of Vardan's songs called “Silence” was later performed by Mister X and recorded in Chicago Recording Company, USA. The song was included in the singer’s album “Silence” and was commercially released in 2008.

In 2006, Vardan Sardaryan established his own recording studio, where he later produced his first album with singer Lilya Barak. He is the author of the majority of the songs and all music arrangements in the album. In the year of 2009 Vardan was signed to the Songbroker Publishing Company as a songwriter. In the upcoming year he signed a publishing deal with ACM record for his song “Stay With Me”.

As of March 2012, Vardan Sardaryan has been working as the artistic director of Armenian National Show project. He is also the music arranger of the show program, including Armenian folk songs and fragments from Aram Khachaturian’s “Gayane” ballet.
