= Stepan Shakaryan =

Armenian composer & pianist (1935–2019)

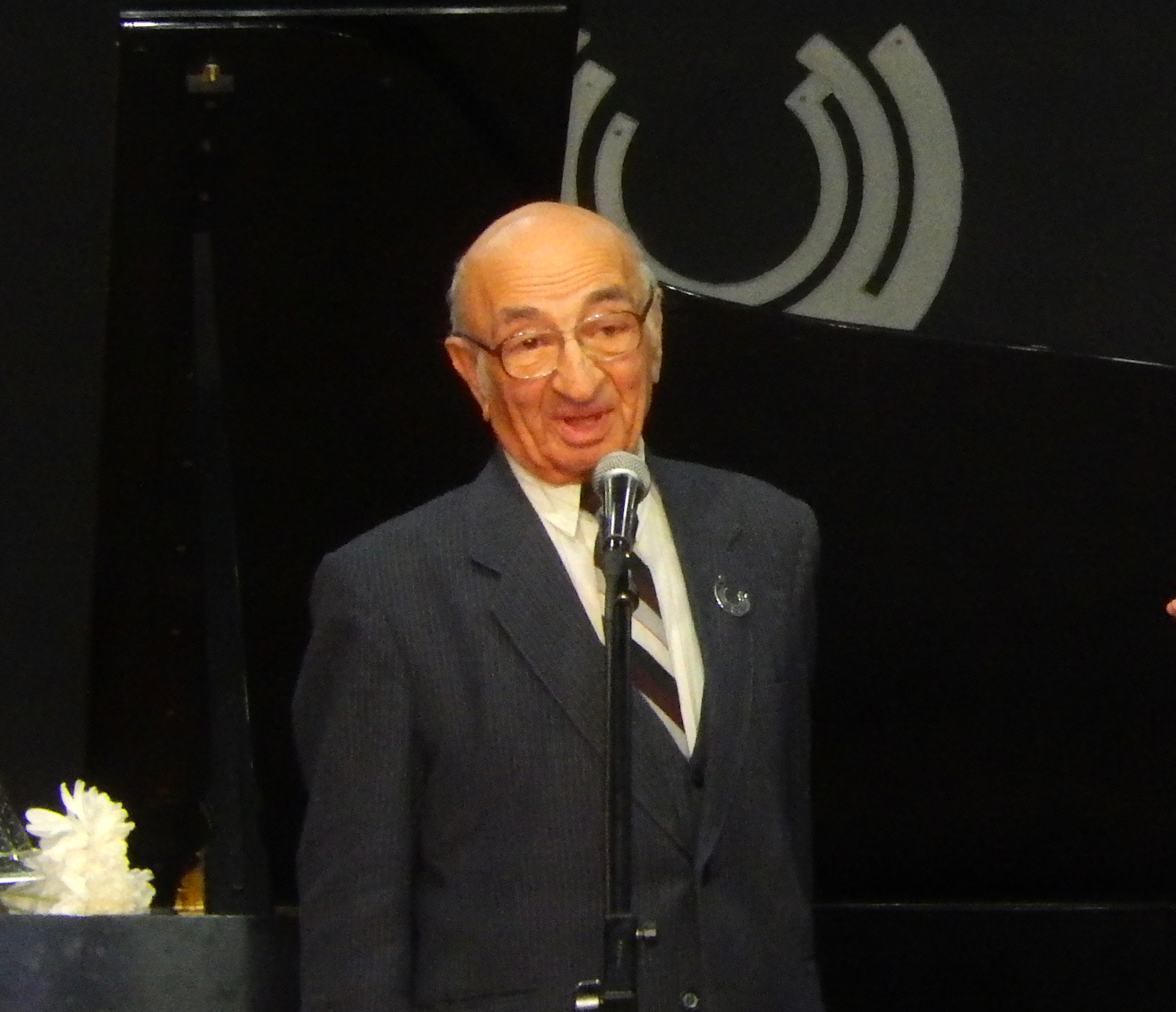
- Born: 23 October 1935; Baku, Azerbaijan SSR, Soviet Union
- Died: 22 June 2019 (aged 83); Yerevan, Armenia
- Citizenship: Armenia
- Education: Gnessin Musical Institute, Yerevan State Conservatory
- Era: 20th-century classical music
- Awards: People's Artist of Armenia (2017)

Stepan Grigori Shakaryan (Armenian: Ստեփան Շաքարյան, 23 October 1935 – 22 June 2019) was an Armenian jazz and classical composer, pianist, People's Artist of Armenia (2017), and professor at Yerevan State Conservatory.

== Biography ==
Stepan Shakaryan was born on 23 October 1935, in Baku, Azerbaijan. In 1952, at the age of 17, he moved to Yerevan, Armenia. 2 years later, at 19 in 1954, Shakaryan entered the Yerevan Komitas State Conservatory. In 1956, Stepan met the Soviet Armenian composer Aram Khachaturian and was transferred to the Moscow Gnesin Institute, then finished Leningrad Conservatory. In 1964, he returned to Yerevan, and in 1965, he won the Yerevan Jazz Festival's Gold medal. Shakaryan was the composer of Sergei Parajanov's "Hakob Hovnatanyan" (1967) and "Pingvinashen" Armenian cartoon.

Shakaryan was the founder, and from 1986 to 1990, the Head of the Soloists Jazz Ensemble of the Radio Committee. Since 1992, he taught at Yerevan State Conservatory. In 2009, Stepan Shakaryan's CD "The Moon on the Mountain" was included in the "Armenian Jazz 70" collection.

== Works ==
=== Symphonic works ===
- Symphony N° 1 (Concert for orchestra, 1961)
- Symphony N° 2 (choreographic symphony, 1965)
- Symphony N° 3 (1975)
- “Festival overture” (1995)
- Symphonic orchestra “Armenia” (1991)
- “Aria” (1982)

=== Chamber works ===
- Theme and Variations (Тема с вариациями) for viola and piano (1959)
- “Poem about Komitas” for string quartet (1965)
- 4 aquarelles for string ensemble (1987)
- Sonata for piano (1963)
- Sonata for piano “Bells” (1982)
- Sonatina for piano (1963)
- Series “Pittoresks” for piano (1983)

=== Choreographic music ===
- Ballet “Jealous” (1965, Yerevan 1992)
- “Aghavnavank” (“Monastery of doves”, 1990)
- “Ripsime” (1998)
- Piece for variety ensemble and jazz

=== Other ===
- “Trio-retro” (piano, violin, violoncello)
- Trio N° 1 (1993)
- Trio N° 2
