= Arax Mansourian =

Armenian soprano singer (born 1946)

- Արաքս Մանսուրյան
- Born: August 1, 1946 (age 80); Beirut, Lebanon
- Citizenship: Armenia; Australia
- Education: Komitas State Conservatory of Yerevan
- Occupations: Classical singer (soprano); singing teacher
- Spouse: Jacob Kiujian
- Children: 2
- Website: arax-mansourian.com

Arax Mansourian (Armenian: Արաքս Մանսուրյան; born August 1, 1946) is an Armenian soprano classical singer. She has served as Professor at the Komitas State Conservatory of Yerevan since 2015. In 2015 she was awarded with the First Degree Medal of Armenia. In 2010, Mansourian was Awarded with the Medal of Komitas by the Ministry of the Diaspora.

== Early life and education ==
Born in Beirut, Lebanon, Arax Mansourian moved with her family to Armenia when she was still an infant, growing up there. She studied at the Romanos Meliqyan College of Music and later graduated from the Komitas State Conservatory, where she was the only performer of modern classical atonal music. During her studies she participated in festivals throughout Russia and elsewhere in the Soviet Union. Soon after graduation, she started to sing at the Yerevan State Opera.

== Career ==
After moving to Australia in the mid-1990s, she started her work with Opera Australia (OA). Her first role with OA was of Liu in Puccini's Turandot; Liu was followed by Santuzza in Mascagni's Cavalleria Rusticana in Melbourne (OA), Sydney Opera House (OA) and Brisbane for Opera Queensland. Then came Tosca in Puccini's Tosca (Opera Queensland), Desdemona in Verdi's Otello (OA), Elisabeth de Valois in Verdi's Don Carlos, Fata Morgana in Prokofiev's Love for Three Oranges (OA Sydney), Katya in Janacek's Katya Kabanova (OA Sydney).

== Personal life and other ventures ==
Mansourian lives with her husband, Jacob Kiujian, in Sydney, Australia. She has two daughters. She teaches and gives vocal masterclasses. Since 2012, Mansourian has worked with the Donate Life children's charity in Armenia, organizing concerts with the proceeds going to the organization.

== Other sources ==
- Arax Mansourian - Armenian National Music
- "Armenia's 'Joan Sutherland' calls Sydney home". The Age. 8 April 2002.
- "AusStage". AusStage.
- "Composers! A call to arms - Arts". www.smh.com.au. 26 March 2004.
- "ABC Classic FM Music Details: Sunday 10 November 2002". Abc.net.au. Archived from the original on 14 December 2015.
- "Sunday Morning - John Haddock and Arax Mansourian -18/04/2004". Abc.net.au. 18 April 2004.
- "Press conference of famous opera singer Arax Mansourian and her three Greek, Chinese and Australian students (photoset) - PanARMENIAN Photo". Panarmenian.net.
- "InReview.702". Operanews.com.
- "2003 Reviews 32 (Theatre/Stage Brisbane Queensland Australia)". Stagediary.com. Archived from the original on 24 September 2015.
- "Music News Australia | AIM Music School". Aim.edu.au.
