= Martin Yeritsyan =

Armenian violinist (1932–2022)

- Born: 31 January 1932; Yerevan, Armenian SSR, USSR
- Died: 20 February 2022 (aged 90) Yerevan, Armenia
- Occupations: Musician winemaker maker of musical instruments
- Instrument: Violin

Martin Shahen Yeritsyan (Armenian: Մարտին Շահենի Երիցյան, 31 January 1932 – 20 February 2022) was an Armenian violinist, maker of musical instruments, luthier and winemaker. He was a professor of the Komitas State Conservatory of Yerevan.

== Biography ==
Son of Shahen Yeritsyan, the founder of winemaking in Armenia, Martin was born in Yerevan, Armenia. He graduated from the Komitas State Conservatory of Yerevan and soon entered the Armenian Philharmonic Quartet as a second violinist. In 1969, as a member of the quartet, he participated in the Queen Elisabeth Competition in Brussels. He toured in France, Italy, Russia and other countries. He taught at the chair of the quartet of the Yerevan Komitas State Conservatory (professor). In 1985 he left for Czechoslovakia, where he worked with the famous winemaker Vladimir Pilarji in his workshop.

Yeritsyan made many different stringed musical instruments, mainly focusing on violins. He wrote in Latin inside the musical instruments: "Martin Yeritsyan, son of Shahen", also indicates "Made in Yerevan" and the year of manufacture.

He died on 20 February 2022, at the age of 90.

== Awards ==
Yeritsyan received many awards and diplomas, including:

- Prize of the Stradivarius International Competition in Italy, 1980
- Medal for Merit, 2020
