= Ara Aloyan =

Armenian writer

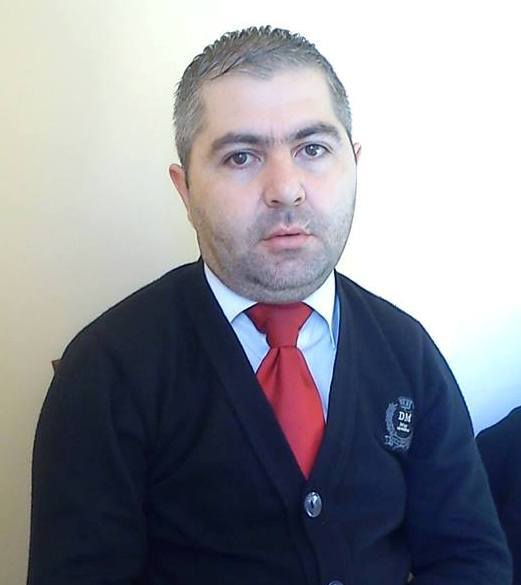
- Born: August 19, 1981 (age 43); Vardenis

Ara Aloyan (Armenian: Արա Ալոյան; born August 19, 1981, Vardenis) is an Armenian poet, writer, musician, pedagogue, journalist, and member of Armenian writers' union of Gegharkunik region.

== Biography ==
Ara Aloyan graduated from Vardenis secondary school after Edvard Poghosyan (1988–1998). He also studied at Vardenis Art School, in the drawing and sculpture department (1990–1995), at Vardenis Music School, in the duduk department (1991–1996), before finally graduating from Komitas State Conservatory of Yerevan (1998–2003).

Since 2007 he has been working as a journalist. He has worked as a journalist, screenwriter and editor in such TV channels as "Yerkir Media", "Hay TV", "TV 5", "Armenia", "Atv" Since 2014 Ara Aloyan has been a director in the news, political and social department at "H3" channel, since March 2016 chief editor and General Deputy Director of "H3" channel. Also he has his own TV programme, called Orva khndir (The matter of a day).

Ara Aloyan's poems have been published in Kanch's digest of the "Hope, belief, love" series and in the "Modern student poetry" digest. His poems have been translated and published in Lebanon, Serbia, Abkhazia, Russia, Iran and several other countries. . He has written four published books of poems:

- Before I Became A Light (2003)
- Don't Become Illuminated (2014)
- Footprints With Watercolor (2015)
- Symphony Of Sorrow And Resurrection (2015)

== Awards ==
- The winner of multiple contests as a musician and poet
- "Ruben Sevak" Literary Award, 1997
- "Write" literary contest winner, 2013
