= Eduard Sadoyan =

Armenian composer

Eduard Sadoyan Էդուարդ Սադոյան
- Born: 22 August 1938; Yerevan, Armenian SSR
- Died: 21 February 2018 (aged 79); Yerevan, Armenia
- Genres: Classical music
- Occupation: Composer
- Years active: 1970s – 2018

Eduard Sadoyan (Armenian: Էդուարդ Սադոյան, 22 August 1932 — 21 February 2018) was an Armenian composer. Honored Art Worker of Armenia (2013).

== Biography ==
Eduard Sadoyan was born on 22 August 1932 in Yerevan, Armenian SSR.

Between 1968 and 1971, he attended the Tchaikovsky Moscow State Conservatory as an auditor, studying under Aram Khachaturian and Sergey Balasanian.

He graduated in 1976 from the composition faculty at the Komitas State Conservatory of Yerevan, under the tutelage of Alexander Arutiunian.

He became a member of the Armenian Composers' Union in 1979.

== Compositions ==
His works encompass a wide array of genres—operas, ballets, symphonies, concertos, string quartets, choral and vocal-instrumental music.

Notable compositions include:

- Symphony «Goyamart» («Struggle for Existence»)
- Symphonietta «Three Words about Armenia»
- Mono-Opera «The Tree of Life»
- Children’s Pieces for Piano (1961-1978)
- Chamber Opera «Memoirs of Princess Maria Volkonskaya» (1978)
- Concerto for Flute and Chamber Orchestra (1981)
- Chamber Opera «Hey, Who’s Here?» (1982)
- Chamber Music with Pantomime: «Bidsstrup’s Caricatures» (1984)
- «Hayrens of Love» for Soprano and Piano (or Ensemble)
- Sonata for Clarinet and Piano (1989)
- Sonata-Monologue for Piano (1989)
- Opera «Saint Gregory the Illuminator» (2003)
- Ballet «Narekatsi - Prayer to God» (2008)
- «Dedication to Arshile Gorky» (Sonata for Piano, Gong and Campana) (2011)
- Children’s Ballet «The Dream of Miracles» (2012)
- Opera «Mashtots» (2014)
- 13 pieces from «Narekatsi: Prayer to God» Ballet, for Piano (2014)
- Concerto for Piano & Strings «Siamanto» (2017-2018)

== Honors ==
- Honored Art Worker of Armenia (2013).
