= Gevorg Sargsyan =

Armenian conductor (born 1981)

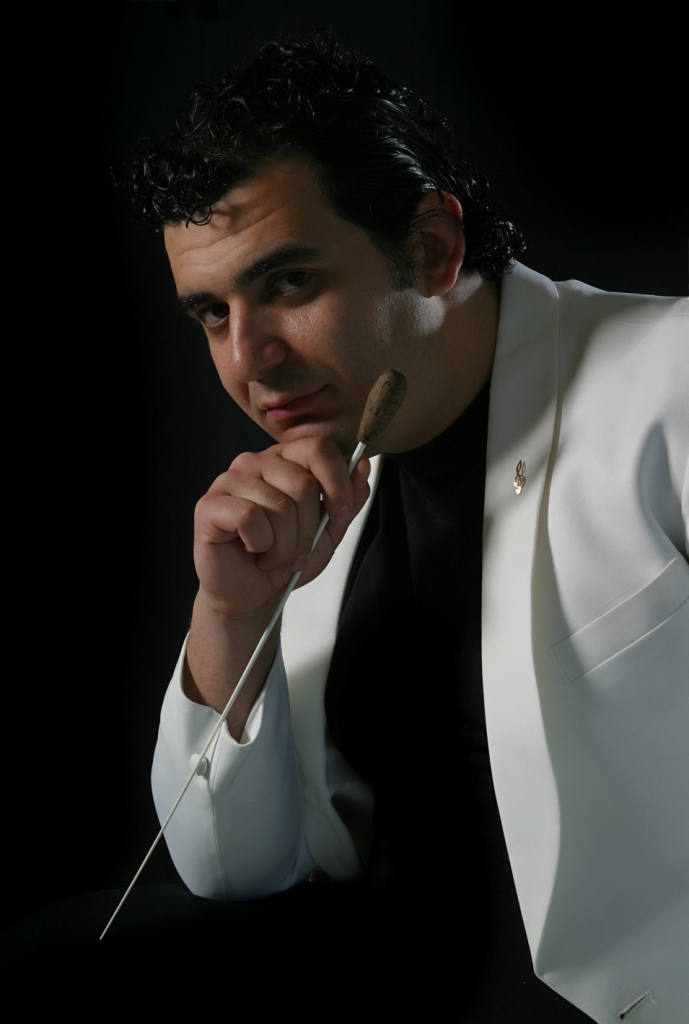
Gevorg Sargsyan

Gevorg Sargsyan (Armenian: Գևորգ Սարգսյան; born October 5, 1981) is an Armenian conductor.

Winner of Sir Georg Solti Foundation grant-award for 2006, Gevorg Sargsyan is one of the most renowned Armenian artists in his generation.

Born in Yerevan, Armenia he made his first steps as a musician as a cellist. In 1999, Gevorg Sargsyan, as an exceptional case, was admitted to the Orchestral Conducting Department of Yerevan Komitas State Musical Conservatory (prof. Yuri Davtyan).

Aged 18, on his first year of studying Sargsyan proved to be an advanced student and was selected by the Yerevan State Conservatory to fill the position of music director and conductor of Conservatory's Symphony Orchestra. In 2002-2003 Gevorg continued his studies at the Konservatorium Wien (Austria) with prof. Max Cencic. He later participated on conducting Master course with Prof. Dominique Rouits (Paris Conservatory) in Italy.

Since 2002, Maestro Sargsyan is an honorary conductor of Yerevan Youth Chamber Orchestra. In 2005, he was appointed as assistant director and conductor of the Armenian National Academic Opera & Ballet Theatre.

Sargsyan's teaching activity includes lessons at the State Conservatory of Armenia, masterclass of orchestral conducting in Valencia, Spain, University of Philippines among others.

Gevorg Sargsyan is a “Master Class” labeled artist of the Armenian Music Center, a leading company in Armenia of producing CDs & DVDs. Recordings of classical masterpieces made by Gevorg Sargsyan are an integral part of Armenian Music Center’s productions.

Sargsyan has performed with numerous concerts in Armenia and overseas. He is currently working and living in Singapore, where he is a Music Director of Madison Academy of Music. He is also now the music conductor of the Strings Ensemble in Singapore Chinese Girls' School.
