= Ghazaros Saryan =

Armenian composer (1920–1998)

- Ղազարոս Սարյան
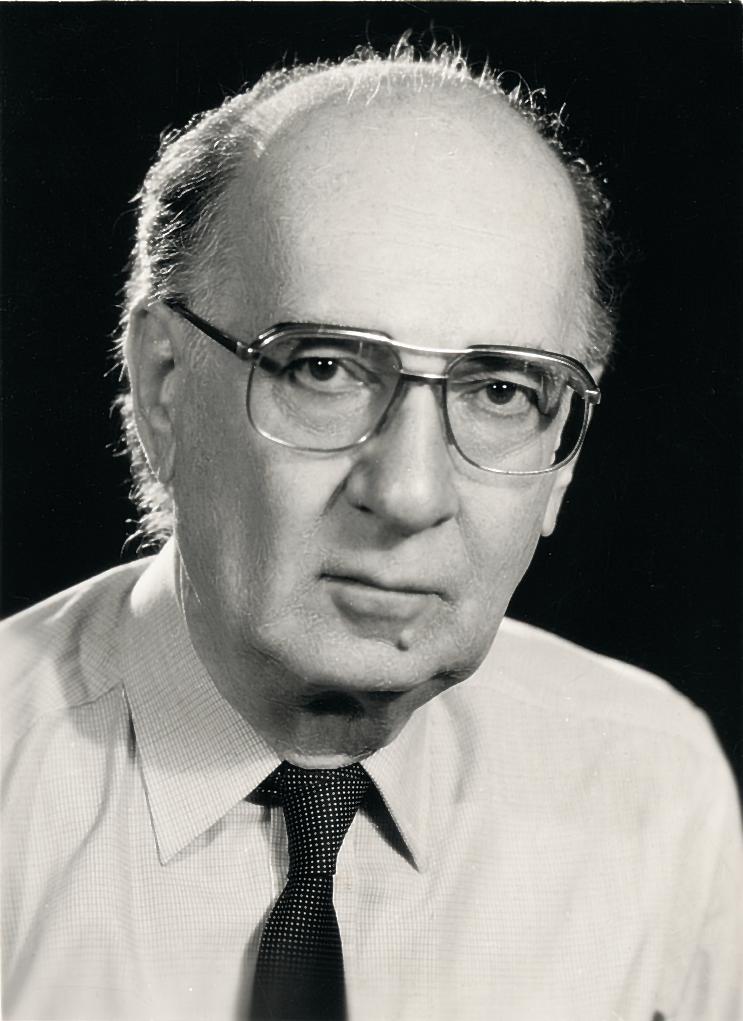
- Saryan in 1965
- Born: 30 September 1920; Rostov-on-Don, Russian SFSR
- Died: 27 May 1998 (aged 77); Yerevan, Armenia
- Occupations: Composer; Educator

Ghazaros (Lazarus) Saryan (Armenian: Ղազարոս Սարյան, Russian: Лазарь Мартиросович Сарьян; 30 September 1920 – 27 May 1998) was an Armenian composer and educator.

== Life and career ==
Ghazaros Saryan was born into a family of distinguished Armenian artists. He was the son of renowned painter Martiros Saryan and the grandson of the prominent writer Ghazaros Aghayan. Musically gifted, Ghazaros attended the Yerevan State Conservatory from 1934 to 1938, where he studied composition with Sargis Barkhudaryan and Vardges Talyan. Afterwards, he travelled to Moscow and enrolled in the composition class of Vissarion Shebalin at the Gnessin State Musical College.

With the outbreak of World War II in 1941, Ghazaros was drafted into the Soviet army and served actively until 1945. Subsequently, he entered the Moscow Conservatory. Among his composition teachers were Dmitri Kabalevsky, Dmitri Shostakovich and Anatoly Nikolayevich Alexandrov. Saryan graduated in 1950.

Upon his return to Armenia, Saryan joined the faculty of the Yerevan Komitas State Conservatory where he taught orchestration. During 1955–56, he was chairman of the Armenian Composers' Union. In 1960, he was appointed rector of the Conservatory, a position he retained until 1986. Saryan taught composition as well, training such Armenian composers as Tigran Mansurian, Rober Altunyan, Vardan Adjemyan and Ruben Sargsyan.

Ghazaros Saryan was essentially a composer of symphonic oeuvre. He also wrote works for chamber music, as well as several film scores.

Saryan received many awards, including the honorary titles People's Artist of the Armenian SSR in 1972 and People's Artist of the USSR in 1991. For his military service he was decorated with the Order of the Red Star.

Saryan's Armenia: Symphonic Panels was performed in 1991 at the Pierre Boulez Contemporary Music Center in Metz, France, and his Passacaglia was presented in 1995 during the Athens Music Festival.

Ghazaros Saryan's manuscripts are deposited at the Martiros Saryan Museum, in Yerevan, Armenia.

== Compositions ==
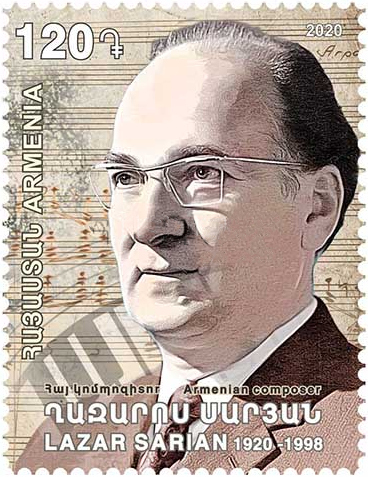
Saryan on a 2020 stamp of Armenia

=== Orchestra ===
- Symphonic Poem, 1950
- Symphonic Images, 1956
- Հանդիսավոր նախերգանք [Festive Overture], 1957
- Adagio and Dance, string orch, 1957
- Serenade, 1959
- Armenia: Symphonic Panels on motifs by Martiros Saryan, 1966
- Vn Concerto, 1972
- Symphony, 1980
- Choreographic Composition, 1987
- Passacaglia, 1994
- Fanfares, 1996
- Andante and Presto, vn, chm orch, 1997

=== Vocal ===
- Սովետական Հայաստան [Soviet Armenia], vocal soloists and chorus, 1950
- Երգ խաղաղության [Peace Song], voice, pf, 1951
- Խաղաղության օրը [Day of Peace] (vocal-symphonic suite), chorus and orch, 1953
- Քեզ եմ երգում, Հայրենիք [Fatherland, I Am Singing of You], voice, pf, 1955

=== Instrumental ===
- Theme with Variations, pf, 1947
- Sonata no. 1, vc, pf, 1948
- String Quartet no. 1, 1949
- Dance, pf, 1955
- Concert Piece, trp, pf, 1962
- Aria and Toccata, vn, pf, 1966
- Պապիկի ժամացույցը [Grandfather's Clock], pf, 1970
- String Quartet no. 2, 1986
- Sonata no. 2, vc, pf, 1989
- 3 Postludes, pf, 1990

=== Romances ===
- Ինչու՞ ուշացար [Why Are You Late?], 1956
- Հինգ քնարական երգեր [Five Lyrical Songs], 1960

=== Film Scores ===
- Փեսատես [Visiting the Groom], 1953
- Մանրունք [Small Change], 1954
- Հովազաձորի գերիները [The Captives of Hovazadzor], 1956
- Առաջին սիրո երգը [The Song of First Love] (composed with Arno Babadjanian), 1958
- 01-99, 1959
- Նրա երազանքը [Her Fantasy], 1959
- Մեր թաղի ձայները [The Voices of Our Neighborhood], 1960
- Մարտիրոս Սարյան [Martiros Saryan], 1965
- Արևային գույների մեղեդին [Melodies of Sunshine], 1979

== Recordings ==
- http://cdbaby.com/cd/lazarsaryan (Chamber Music)
- http://cdbaby.com/cd/lazarsaryan2 (Symphonic Music)
