= David Khanjyan =

Soviet Armenian musician

David Khanjyan Դավիթ Խանջյան
- Born: July 30, 1940; Yerevan, Armenian SSR, Soviet Union
- Died: March 14, 1981 (aged 40) Yerevan, Armenian SSR, Soviet Union
- Genres: Classical
- Occupations: Conductor; Pianist
- Instrument: Singing
- Award: State Prize of the Armenian SSR (1981, posthumously)

David Hakobi Khanjyan (Note: Armenian: Դավիթ Հակոբի Խանջյան, romanized: Davitʻ Hakobi Khanjyan; Russian: Давид Акопович Ханджян, romanized: David Akopovich Khandzhyan) (July 30, 1940 – February 1981) was a Soviet Armenian conductor and pianist.

Khanjian was born in the family of Hakob Khanjian and Tatevik Sazandaryan. He finished the piano department of Yerevan State Conservatory, then entered to conduction department of the same conservatory. Then he studied Hans Swarowsky in the Vienna Music Academy. From 1974 to 1981 he was the Artistic Director and Principal Conductor of Armenian Philharmonic Orchestra.
