= Vartan Adjemian =

Armenian composer

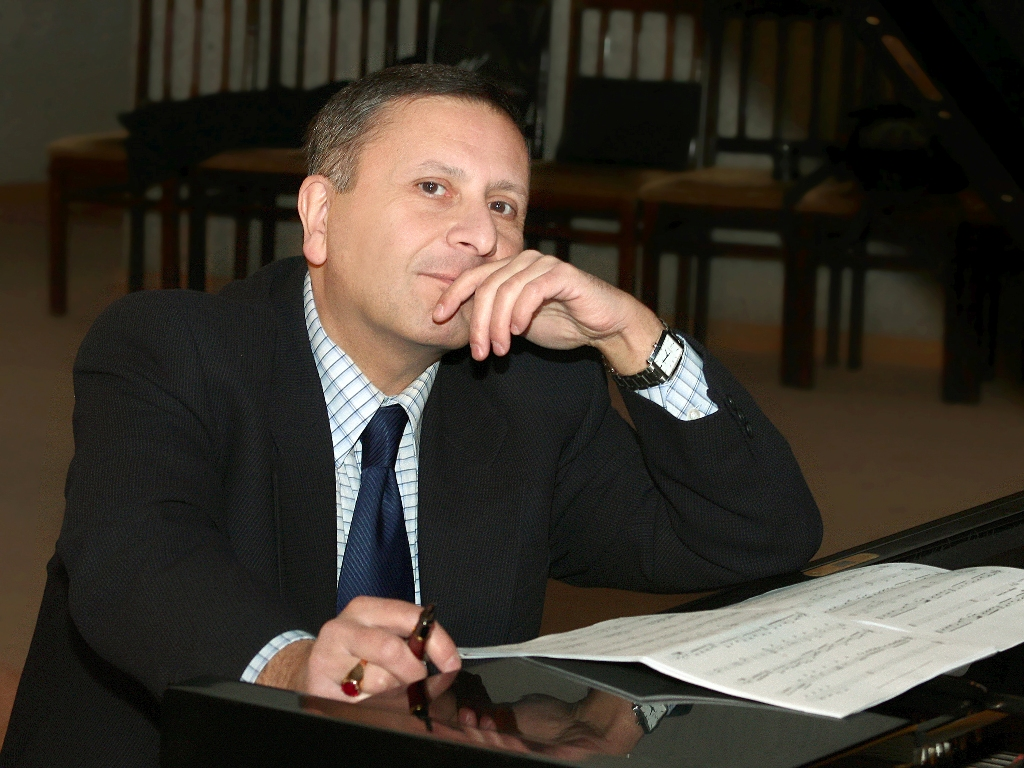
- Vartan Adjemian, 2008
- Born: April 27, 1956 (age 69); Armenian Soviet Socialist Republic
- Occupation: Composer
- Era: Contemporary
- Children: Arus Adjemian, Natella Adjemian

Vartan Adjemian (Armenian: Վարդան Աճեմյան, IPA: [vɑɾˈtʰɑn ɑt͡ʃɛmˈjɑn], Russian: Вартан Аджемян; born 27 April 1956) is an Armenian composer of orchestral, operatic, and chamber music whose works have been performed worldwide.

== Career ==
Adjemian studied composition with prominent Armenian composer Ghazaros Saryan (son of Martiros Saryan) at the Yerevan Komitas State Conservatory from 1973 to 1981.

In 1987, Adjemian was awarded the National Prize of the Armenian SSR (for his Symphony No. 1). His music has been performed in Armenia, Bulgaria, the Czech Republic, Finland, Georgia, Iceland, Poland, Russia, the United Kingdom, Switzerland, and the United States. In 2007, six of his major works were commissioned by BIM Edition (Switzerland). He has been a member of SUISA since 2008.

Adjemian has taught composition at the Yerevan Komitas State Conservatory since 1987 and was appointed a professor in 2001. He has been Head of the Composition Department since 2002.

== Family ==
His grandfather, Vardan Ajemian (1905–1977), was the General Stage Director of the National Theatre of Armenia and his grandmother was Arus Asryan (1904–1987), one of the leading actress of the same theatre. His father, Alexander Adjemian (1925–1987), was a composer, author of seven symphonies, chamber works and popular songs. His daughter is a prominent Armenian pianist.

== Major works ==
=== Orchestral ===
- Symphonic Poem, 1976;
- Concerto (vocalise), soprano, mezzo-soprano, large orchestra, 1981;
- Concerto for Orchestra, 1981;
- Symphony No. 1, 1986;
- Symphony No. 2 (in memoriam Alexander Adjemian), large orchestra, 1989;
- Piano Concerto No. 1 (vocalise), 33 mixed voices, piano, large orchestra, 1991;
- Concerto for cello and large orchestra, 1993;
- Festive Overture, 1995;
- Concerto, flute, large orchestra, 1996;
- Overture in C Major, 22 strings, 2000;
- Faith (song) for large symphonic orchestra and choir, 2001;
- Symphony No. 3 (dedicated to Edvard Mirzoyan), 22 strings, 2002;
- Chants of Spring and Love, soprano and orchestra, 2003;
- Piano Concerto No. 2, piano, big orchestra, 2005
- Adventure for alto saxophone solo, piano and string orchestra, 2004
- Symphony No. 4 (dedicated to the victims of the Genozide) 2015
- Requiem for Chamber Orchestra and Duduk 2023

=== Chamber music ===
- Sonata No. 1, flute, piano, 1975;
- Sonata for alto flute and cello, 1983;
- Sonata No. 2, flute, piano, 1984;
- Trio No. 1, violin, cello, piano, 1987;
- Sonata Fantasy for cello and piano, 1993;
- Sonata for violin and piano, 1995;
- Fantasy for tuba, piano, 1998;
- Eternity poem for voice, violin, cello, piano, 1996;
- Quintet, piccolo, tuba, double bass, piano, vibraphone, 1998;
- String Quartet (in memoriam Lazarus Saryan), 1998;
- Overture in C major, 2000;
- Trio No. 2, violin, cello, piano, 2004;
- Novel for viola and piano, 2007

Blues for 2 tubas, string quartet and piano 2010

=== Vocal ===
- Five Songs (texts by Gurgen Mahari, Vahan Terian) for mezzo-soprano and piano, 1979;
- Ballade (text by Gurgen Mahari) for soprano, string quartet and double bass, 1980;
- Hayastan, Five Songs (text by Hovhannes Shiraz) for mezzo-soprano and piano, 1985;
- Lyric Songs (texts by Hovhannes Hovhannisyan), 1993;
- Eternity (song cycle, vocalise), soprano, violin, cello, piano, 1996;
- The Nights of Artamet, song cycle (texts by Gurgen Mahari), 1996;
- Chants of Spring and Love (Tagհ garnan yev siro) (text by Grigoris Aghtamartsi), soprano, 22 strings, 2002

=== Piano ===
- Three Pieces, 1973;
- Sonata No. 1, 1974;
- Five Pieces, 1975;
- Sonata No. 2, 1975;
- The Bells (Ghoghanjner), poem, 1996;
- Sonata No. 3, 1999;
- Rubato, poem, 2000;
- Frescoes (Vormnankarner) poem, 2001;
- 9 Views (pieces), 2007

=== Opera ===
- The Death of Kikos (2-act comic opera), 1978 (performed in Russian translation by Tamara Demuryan)
- Trdhat (3 acts opera) Opera of Trdat by Vartan Adjemian, with a libretto by Vahan Andreassyan written in 2021, is a powerful three-act opera that intertwines a timeless love story with the epic transformation of Armenia into the world's first nation to adopt Christianity as its state religion under the rule of King Trdat. written in 2021
