= Cavaradossi =

Cavaradossi may refer to:

- Mario Cavaradossi, a character from Tosca, an opera by Giacomo Puccini
- 8945 Cavaradossi, a minor planet
