= Varduhi Yeritsyan =

Varduhi Yeritsyan (born in 1981) is a Franco-Armenian classical pianist.

Born in Yerevan in a family of musicians (her father and mother are pianists), she naturally studied this instrument in a specialized school, from which she graduated at 16 with the first prize. She then entered the Komitas State Conservatory of Yerevan where she studied in particular with Mikhaïl Voskressenski and Victor Merzhanov for there years. In 2002, she moved to France and continued her studies at the Conservatoire de Paris, in Brigitte Engerer's class. She has since played in many concerts, mainly in France, and in Europe.
