= Gagik Hovunts =

Armenian composer (1930–2019)

Gagik Hovunts (1 March 1930 – 1 September 2019) was an Armenian composer, born in Yerevan. He started his music education at the Alexander Spendiaryan Music School. In 1954 he graduated from the Yerevan Komitas State Conservatory, the class of violin with Karp Dombaev, and in 1957 - the class of composition with Grigor Yeghiazaryan. He was a professor at the Yerevan Komitas State Conservatory from 1984 onwards.
