= People's Artist of the Armenian SSR =

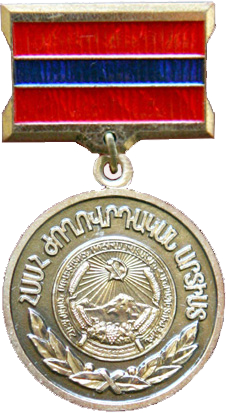
- Awarded for: Outstanding achievements in the performing arts
- Country: Armenian SSR, Soviet Union
- Presented by: Chairman of the Supreme Soviet of the Armenian SSR
- First award: October 23, 1931; 95 years ago

People's Artist of the Armenian SSR (Russian: Народный артист Армянской ССР, Armenian: Հայկական ԽՍՀ ժողովրդական արտիստ), is an honorary title awarded to citizens of the Armenian SSR in the Soviet Union. It is awarded for outstanding performance in the performing arts, whose merits are exceptional in the sphere of the development of the performing arts (theatre, music, dance, circus, cinema, etc.).

== List of recipients (partial list) ==
- Alexander Arutiunian
- Tigran Levonyan
- Djivan Gasparyan
- Khoren Abrahamyan
- Henrik Malyan
- Svetlana Navasardyan
- Konstantin Orbelyan
- Aram Khachaturian
- Frunzik Mkrtchyan
- Zeynab Khanlarova

== See also ==
- People's Artist of the USSR
