= Komitas State Conservatory of Yerevan =

Armenian college of music

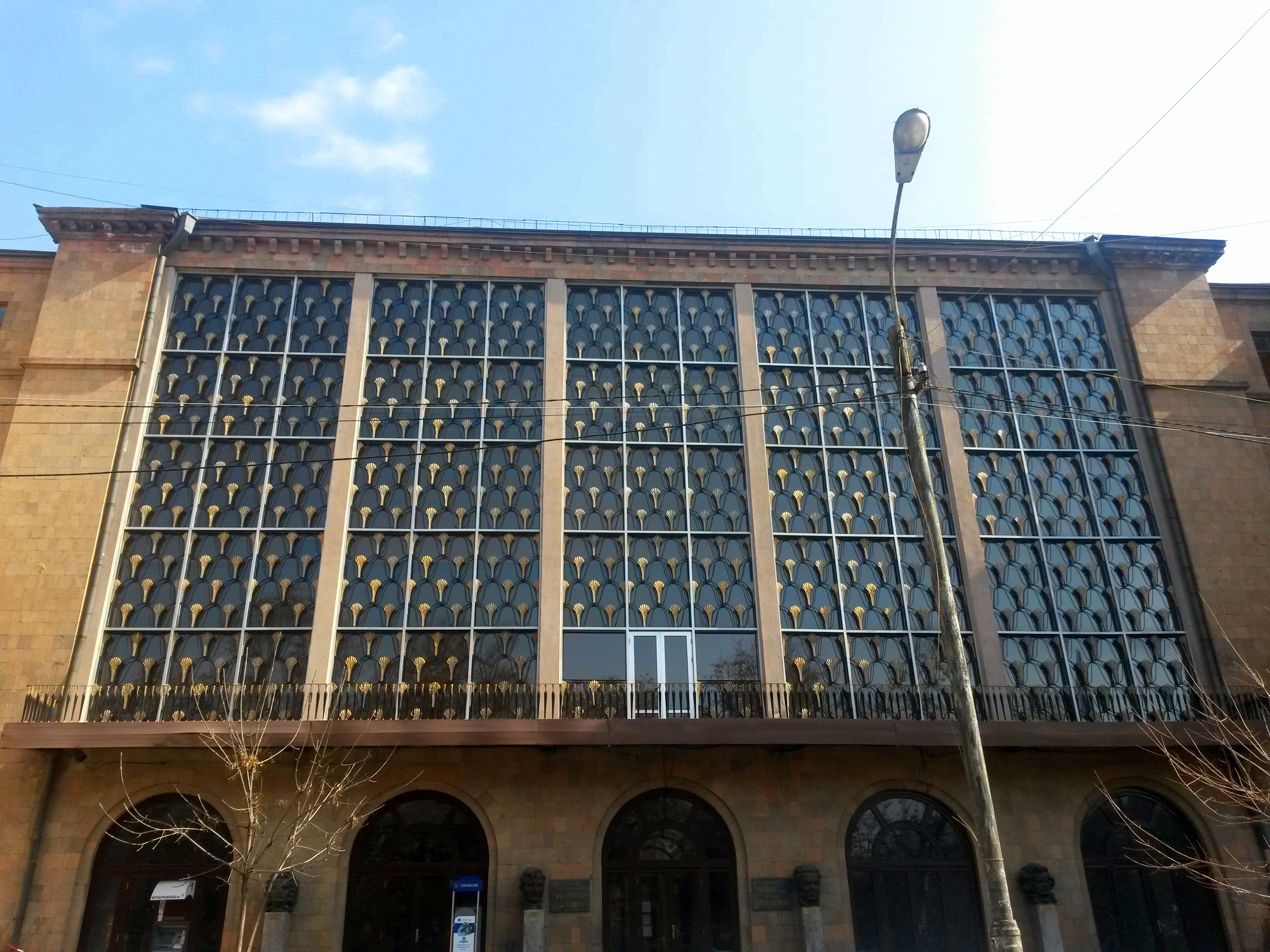
- Type: Public
- Established: 1923; 103 years ago
- Rector: Sona Hovhannisyan
- Location: Yerevan, Armenia; 40°11′13.47″N 44°31′0.88″E
- Campus: Urban
- Website: conservatory.am
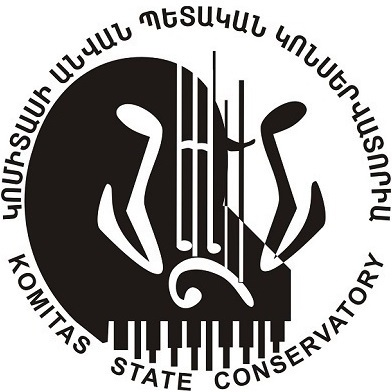

Komitas State Conservatory of Yerevan (Armenian: Երևանի Կոմիտասի անվան պետական կոնսերվատորիա), also known as Yerevan Komitas State Conservatory (YKSC) or Yerevan State Conservatory (YSC), is a state-owned college of music located in Yerevan, Armenia. The institute was founded in 1921 as a music studio. In 1923, it was turned into a higher musical education institution. It is named after Komitas, the founder of the Armenian national school of music.

== Student Council ==
The Student Council is self-governed and is formed of students from different study years, who are chosen in the faculty student meetings. The chairman is chosen by the council members. The Student Council is aimed to defend students' interests, help them to solve their social and life problems and organize their free time. The council provides financial aid, nominal scholarships and removes the study fee fully or partially. The chairman of the council is co-opted to the YSC Rectorate. The students also delegate 25% of the Student Council staff to the Big Council of the YSC.

== Orchestra ==
The YSC has a permanent student symphony orchestra, chamber, and folk instruments orchestras, folklore choir and different chamber ensembles: trios, quartets, a wind sextet, etc.

The Opera Studio with its symphony orchestra and choir is situated in one of the YSC buildings. The Studio has at its disposal the Big Hall with theater stage (275 seats), where the studio participants, both teachers and students: producers, conductors, orchestra musicians and choir singers, stage the operas. All the vocal parts in these operas are performed by the students of the Vocal Department.

There are also three small concert halls in the Conservatory (80-100 seats in each one). They are used for the academic evenings, solo, class, faculty or jubilee recitals, annual session of the Top Student Society, student formal and informal meetings and "skills".

== Rectors ==
- Romanos Melikyan (1923-1924)
- Arshak Adamian (1924-1926)
- Anushavan Ter-Ghevondyan (1926-1930)
- Spiridon Melikyan (1930-1931)
- Snar Snarian (1931-1932)
- Georgiy Hovhannisyan (1932-1933)
- Vardan Samvelyan (1933-1936)
- Konstantin Saradzhev (1936-1937)
- Samson Gasparyan (1937-1940)
- Konstantin Saradzhev (1947-1954)
- Grigor Yeghiazaryan (1954-1960)
- Ghazaros Saryan (1960-1986)
- Edgar Hovhannisyan (1986-1992)
- Tigran Mansurian (1992-1995)
- Armen Smbatian (1995-2002)
- Sergey Sarajyan (2002-2011)
- Shahen Shahinyan (2011-2018)
- Sona Hovhannisyan (2018-)

== Notable alumni ==
- Maria Abajan, soprano
- Medea Abrahamyan
- Vartan Adjemian
- Ara Aloyan
- Tatul Altunyan
- Robert Amirkhanyan
- Vahan Artsruni
- Alexander Arutiunian
- Anzhela Atabekyan
- Robert Atayan
- Khachatur Avetisyan
- Liparit Avetisyan
- Mikael Avetisyan
- Arno Babajanian
- Armen Babakhanian
- Vahram Babayan
- Ani Batikian
- Tsolak Bekaryan
- Raffi Besalyan
- Gayane Chebotaryan
- Levon Chaushian
- Geghuni Chitchian
- Gevorg Dabaghyan
- Siranush Gasparyan
- Gevorg Geodakyan
- Arsen Grigoryan (Mro)
- Gegham Grigoryan
- Alexander Gurgenov
- Tigran Hekekyan
- Gagik Hovunts
- Zakar Keshishian
- David Khanjyan
- Arax Mansourian
- Tigran Mansurian
- Zela Margossian
- Armen Martirosyan
- Tigran Maytesian
- Edvard Mirzoyan
- Armen Movsessian
- Iveta Mukuchyan
- Svetlana Navasardyan
- Hasmik Papian
- Konstantin Petrossian
- Kariné Poghosyan
- Heghine Rapyan
- Stepan Rostomyan
- Eduard Sadoyan
- Vardan Sardaryan
- Gevorg Sargsyan
- Ruben Sargsyan
- Ghazaros Saryan
- Aram Satian
- Stepan Shakaryan
- David Satian
- Vache Sharafyan
- Gerard Jirayr Svazlian
- Nikoghos Tahmizian
- Mikael Tariverdiev
- Eduard Topchjan
- Ara Torosyan
- Anahit Tsitsikian
- Julietta Vardanyan
- William Weiner
- Martin Yeritsyan
- Varduhi Yeritsyan
- Samvel Yervinyan
- Lusine Zakaryan
- Tigran Mkrtchyan
- Vahagn Papayan
- Anahit Papayan

== See also ==
- Sayat-Nova Music School
