= Romanos Melikian =

Armenian composer

Romanos Melikyan
- Born: Romanos Hovakimi Melikian; October 1, 1883; Kizlyar, Russian Empire
- Died: March 30, 1935 (aged 51); Tbilisi, TSFSR, USSR
- Resting place: Komitas Pantheon
- Education: Saint Petersburg Conservatory

Romanos Hovakimi Melikian (Armenian: Ռոմանոս Հովակիմի Մելիքյան; October 1, 1883 – March 30, 1935) was an Armenian composer, conductor, and educator. He played a significant role in the developing Armenian classical music and established Armenian musical institutions such as Komitas State Conservatory of Yerevan, Yerevan Opera Theatre (as one of the founders, and artistic directors), and the Armenian Music Society.

== Early life and education ==
Melikian was born on October 1, 1883, in Kizlyar, Russian Empire (present-day Dagestan, Russia). He received his initial musical education at the Rostov Musical College, graduating in 1905. He moved to Moscow to further his studies, where he studied under renowned musicians such as Mikhail Ippolitov-Ivanov and Boleslav Yavorsky from 1905 to 1907. In 1910, he was accepted to the Saint Petersburg Conservatory, studying composition with Vasily Kalafati and Maximilian Steinberg, and graduated in 1914.

== Career ==
In 1908, at the age of twenty five, Melikian was among the cofounders of "Music League" in Tiflis(now Tbilisi), which later became the Armenian Music Society. He left Tiflis to study at Saint Petersburg Conservatory. After completing his studies, Melikian returned to Tiflis in 1915, but soon after, in 1916, he joined a delegation headed to the province of Van, to provide his assistance to the Armenian population there, following the atrocities committed during the Armenian Genocide.

In 1918, he was appointed as the music director at the Armenian House of Culture in Moscow. By 1920, Melikian divided his time between Tiflis and Yerevan. With support from the Soviet government, he established a music studio in Yerevan in 1921, which later became the Komitas State Conservatory of Yerevan in 1923.

In 1924–1925, he founded a music school in Stepanakert. Returning to Tiflis, he led the music school at the Armenian Art House (Hayartun). From 1926 onwards, Melikian actively promoted the operas of composer Alexander Spendiaryan in Yerevan. In 1933, he co-founded the Armenian Opera and Ballet Theatre in Yerevan and served as its first director.

=== Musical Contributions ===
Melikian was a pioneer of Armenian classical music. He has composed works for choir, solo voice, and piano. His compositions, particularly his romances and song cycles, are highly regarded for their romantic style and incorporation of Armenian folk melodies into the classical music genre. Notable pieces include "Rose," "Autumn," "The Willow," and "Separation." He also played a significant role in preserving and promoting the works of Komitas Vardapet, who was a founding figure in Armenian music.

== Death ==
Romanos Melikian died on March 30, 1935, in Tbilisi. He was laid to rest at the Komitas Pantheon in Yerevan, a cemetery dedicated to Armenian artists and intellectuals.

== Sources ==
- Biography (in Russian)
