= Yerevan Opera Theatre =

Opera house in Yerevan, Armenia

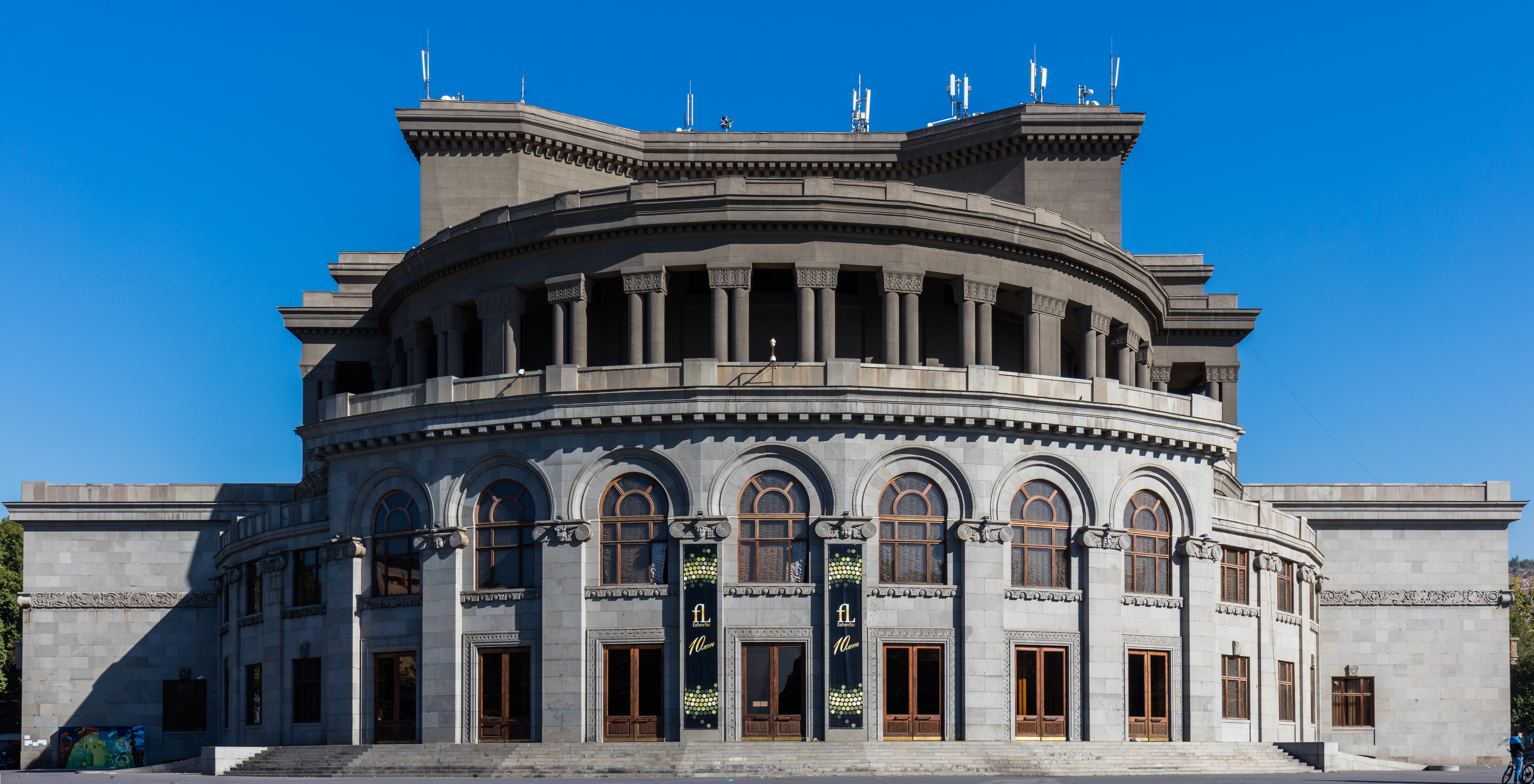
- Yerevan Opera Theatre (2016)
- Interactive map of Yerevan Opera Theatre
- Address: Yerevan; Armenia
- Coordinates: 40°11′9″N 44°30′54″E

Construction
- Opened: 20 January 1933
- Reopened: 1939
- Rebuilt: 1953, 2002
- Architect: Alexander Tamanian

Website
- opera.am/en

The Alexander Spendiaryan National Academic Opera and Ballet Theatre (Armenian: Ալեքսանդր Սպենդիարյանի անվան օպերայի և բալետի ազգային ակադեմիական թատրոն, romanized: Aleksandr Spendiaryani anvan operayi yev baleti azgayin akademiakan t’atron), simply known by locals as 'Opera', is an opera theatre in Yerevan. It officially opened on 20 January 1933, with a performance of Alexander Spendiaryan's opera Almast; the venue is named after this composer. The opera building was designed by architect Alexander Tamanian. It consists of two concert halls; after several renovations, the Aram Khachaturian Concert Hall offers 1300 seats and the Alexander Spendiaryan Opera and Ballet National Theatre about 1070 seats.

== History ==
The ground-breaking of the Opera Theatre took place on 28 November 1930 on the occasion of the 10th anniversary of Soviet Armenia. On 20 January 1933, the building was officially opened. Soon after the theatre foundation, a ballet troupe was established. Swan Lake by Pyotr Ilyich Tchaikovsky was the first ballet performance in 1935.

Based on Tamanian's design and under the supervision of his son the theatre hall was completed in 1939. Large-scale construction works did not finish until 1953, when the entire building was finally completed.

== Performances ==
The opening of the theatre promoted the creation of new national operas and ballets. The first Armenian ballet was Happiness by Aram Khachaturian. On the basis of this ballet the composer soon created Gayane which has been performed all over the world. Many other Armenian composers have written operas and ballets. Over the years, these artists have worked at the theatre: singers Gohar Gasparyan, Tatevik Sazandaryan, Mihran Yerkat, Pavel Lisitsian, Haykanoush Danielyan, Nar Hovhannisyan, Gegham Grigoryan, Anahit Mekhitarian; conductors Konstantin Saradzhev, Michael Tavrizyan, Aram Katanyan, Karen Durgaryan, Gianluca Marciano, Yuri Davtyan; ballet masters A. Petrosyan, M. Chmshkyan, Vanoush Khanamirian, Vilen Galstyan, Rudolf Kharatyan; painters Martiros Saryan, Minas Avetisyan.

Since 1935, the Armenian operas Anoush by Armen Tigranian have been staged at the opera house. It was a great step in Armenian opera history. Anush remains a part of the repertoire of the theatre. One of sopranos currently performing this role is Mary Movsisyan.

Since it was opened, the Armenian National Opera and Ballet Theatre has performed more than 200 different operas and ballets by Armenian, Russian and Western European composers. The theatre company has performed in more than 20 countries, for example, in Russia, Spain, Lebanon, United States, Greece, and Germany. In 1956, the theatre received the status of National Academic Opera and Ballet Theatre.

The theatre has also hosted concerts performed by Charles Aznavour, Ian Anderson, John McLaughlin, Akvarium and many others.

In April 2015, during American rapper Kanye West's visit to Armenia with then-wife Kim Kardashian to mark the 100th anniversary of the Armenian genocide, Kanye performed a free midnight concert outside of the theatre near Swan Lake.

For the first time, the Alexander Spendiaryan National Academic Opera and Ballet Theatre will host a guest performance of Giselle by the English National Ballet. The performances are scheduled for May 10 and 11, 2024.

== Artistic directors ==
- Romanos Melikian
- Yuri Davtyan
- Tigran Levonyan
- Ohan Durian
- Gegham Grigoryan
- Karen Durgaryan
- Constantine Orbelian (since 2016)

== Gallery ==
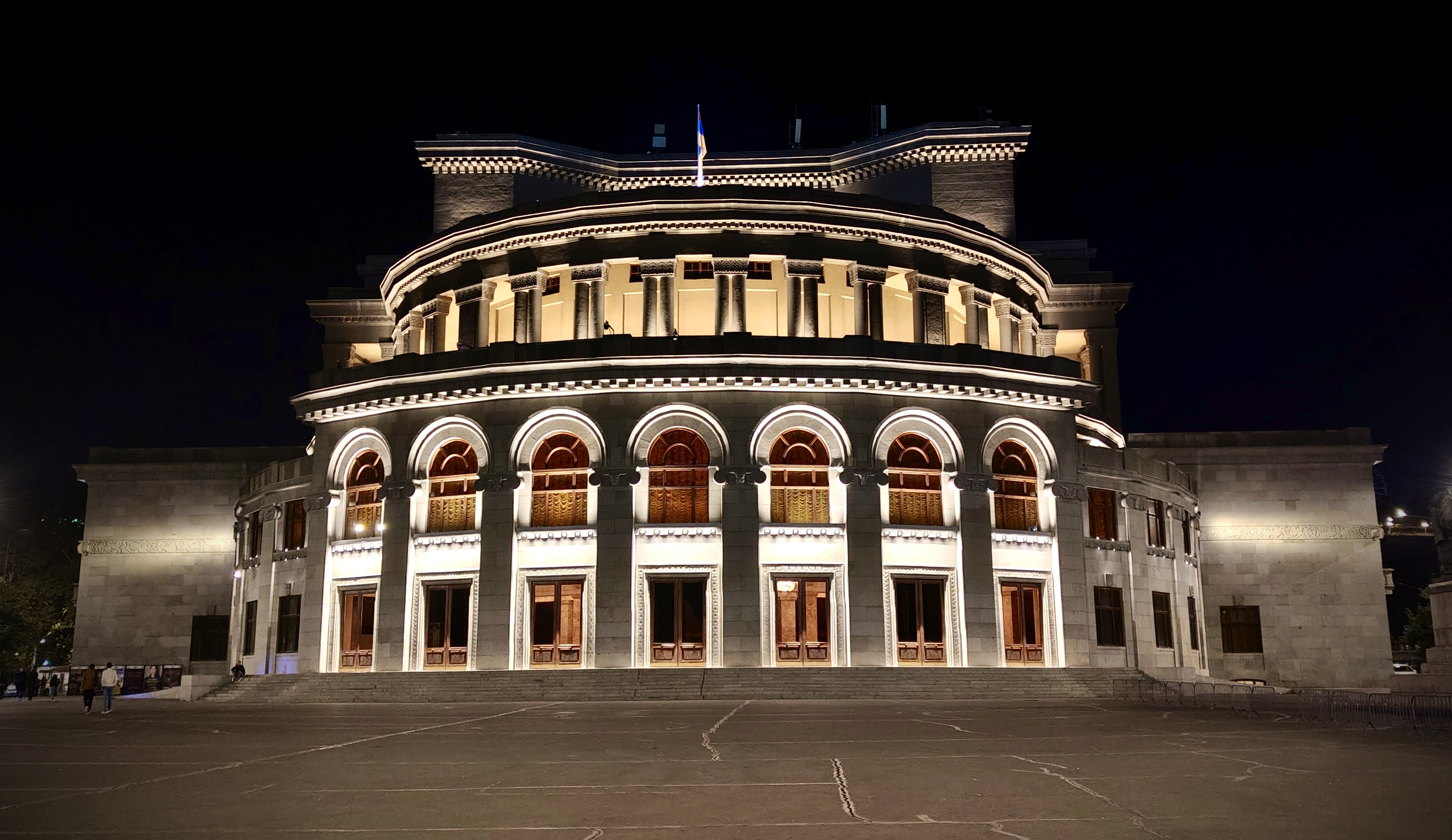
The Opera building at night in 2025.

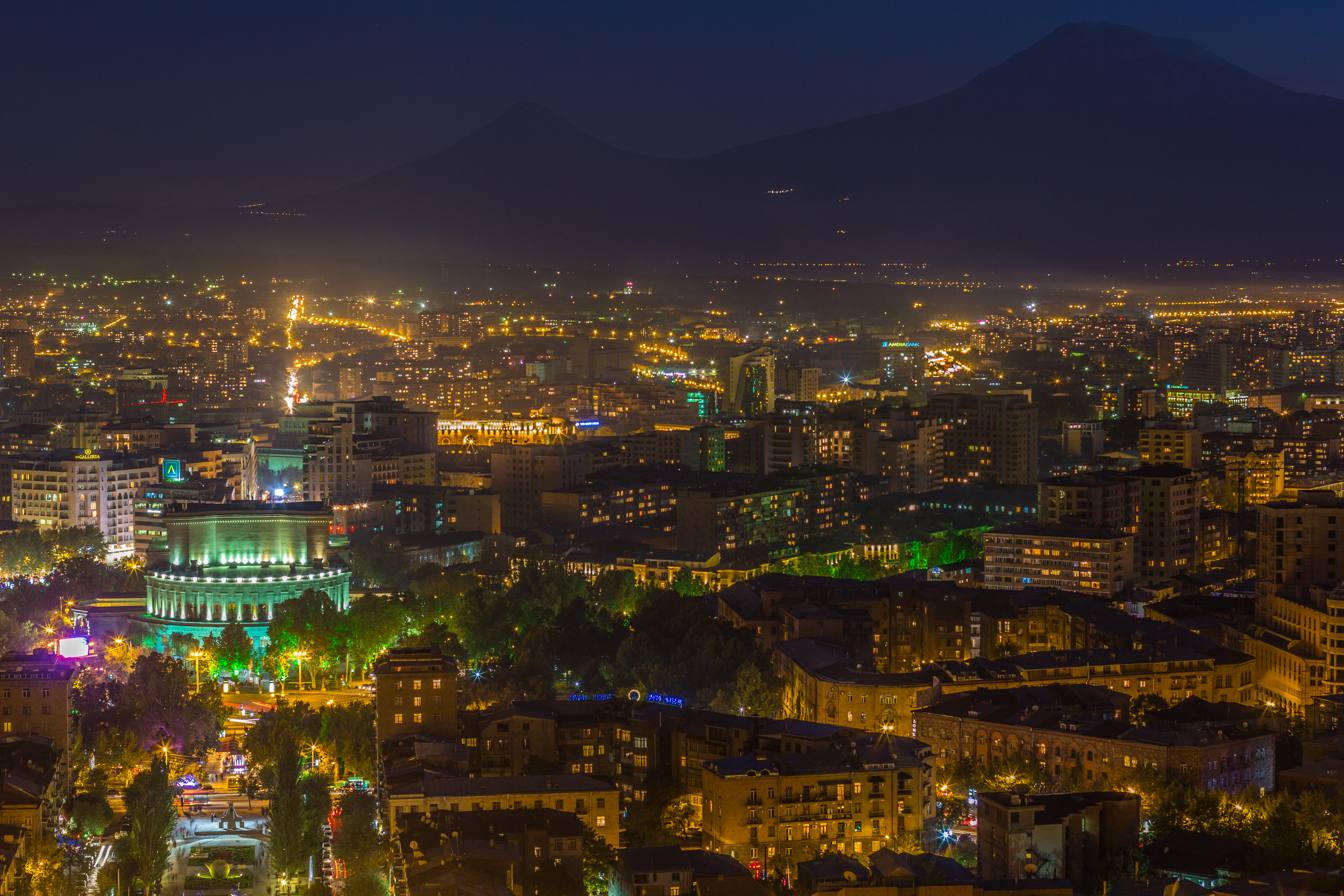
The Opera House (foreground, left) with the Yerevan skyline

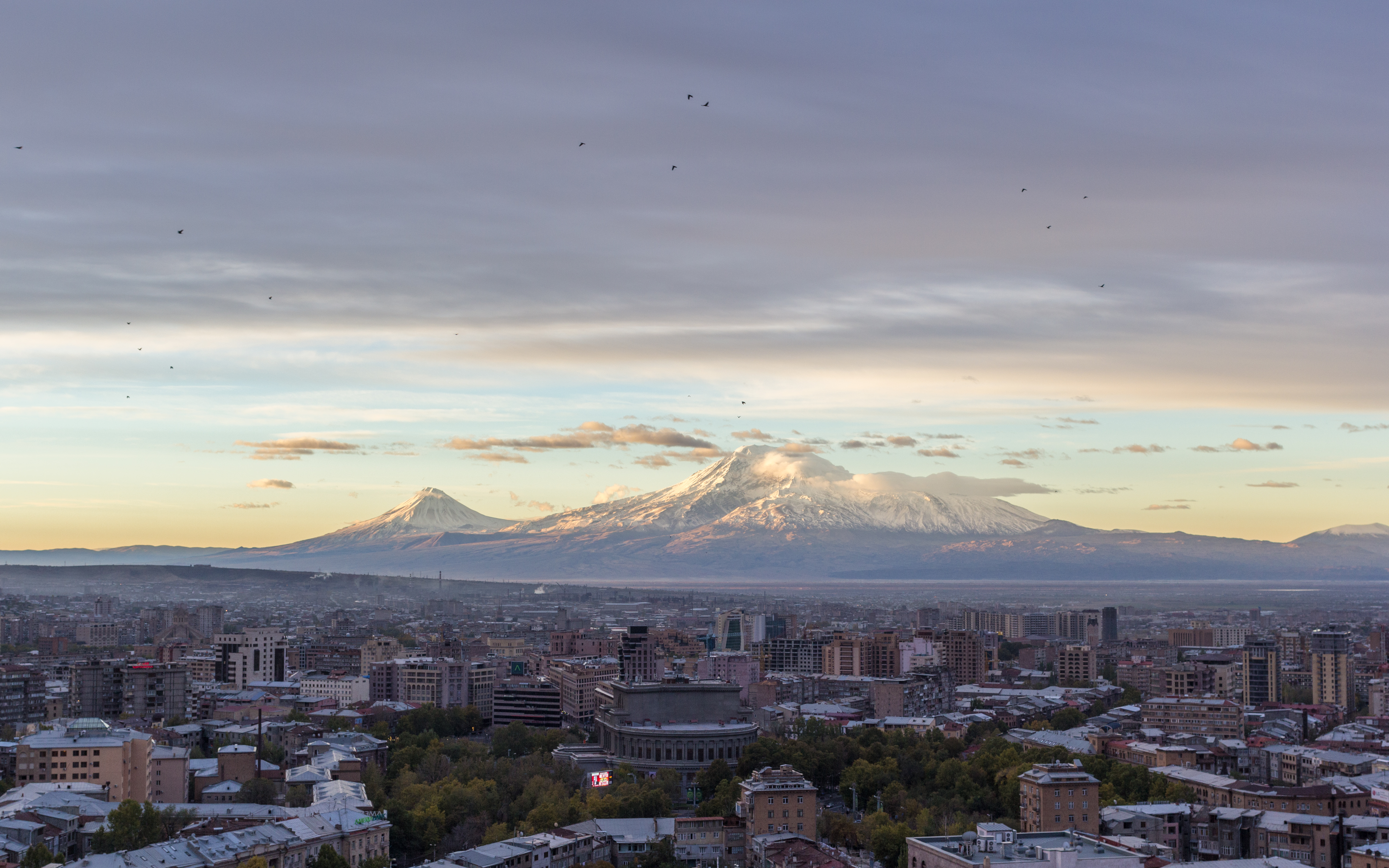
Yerevan skyline with Opera House at dawn

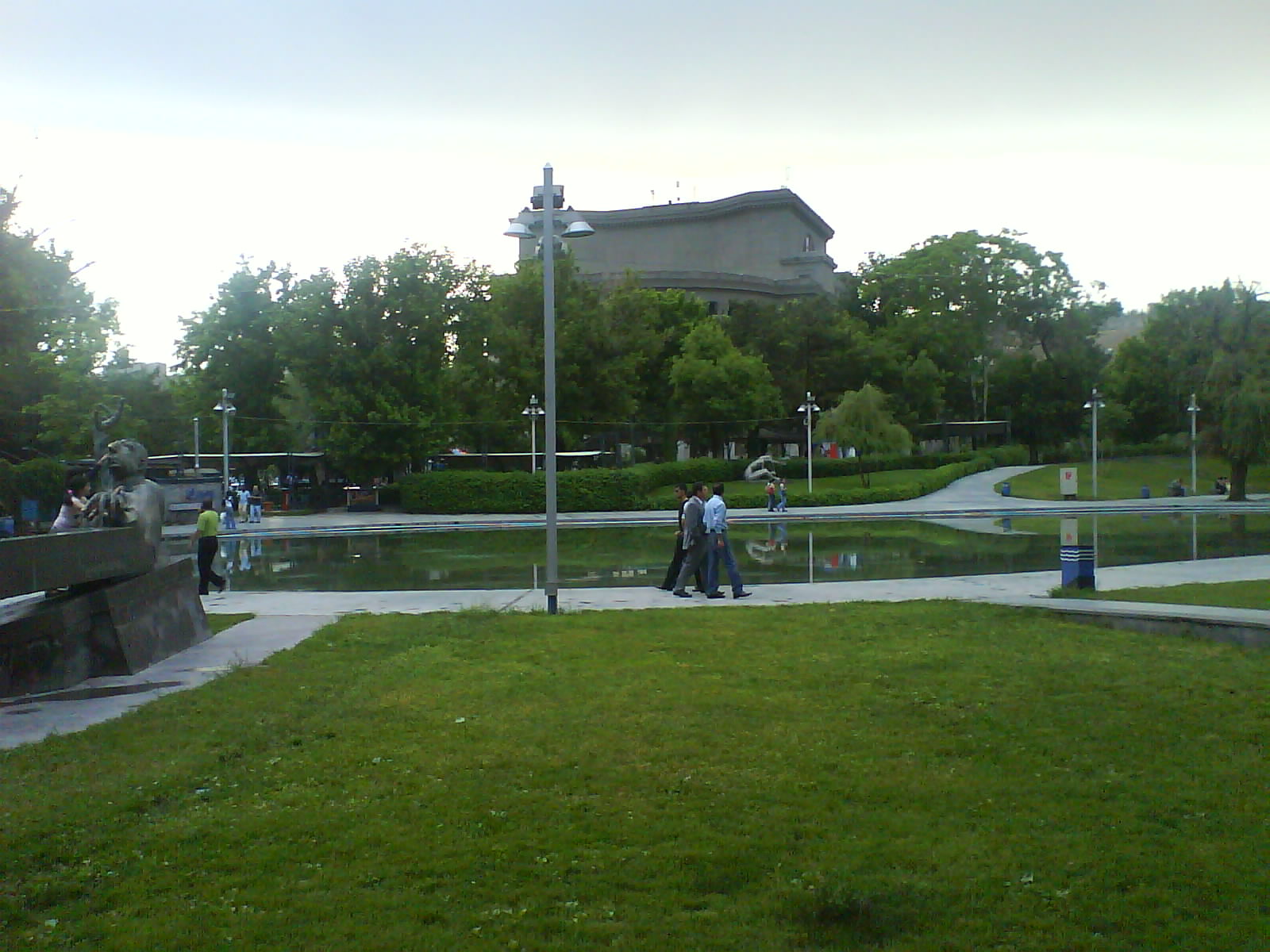
Green spaces and Swan Lake around the Opera House.

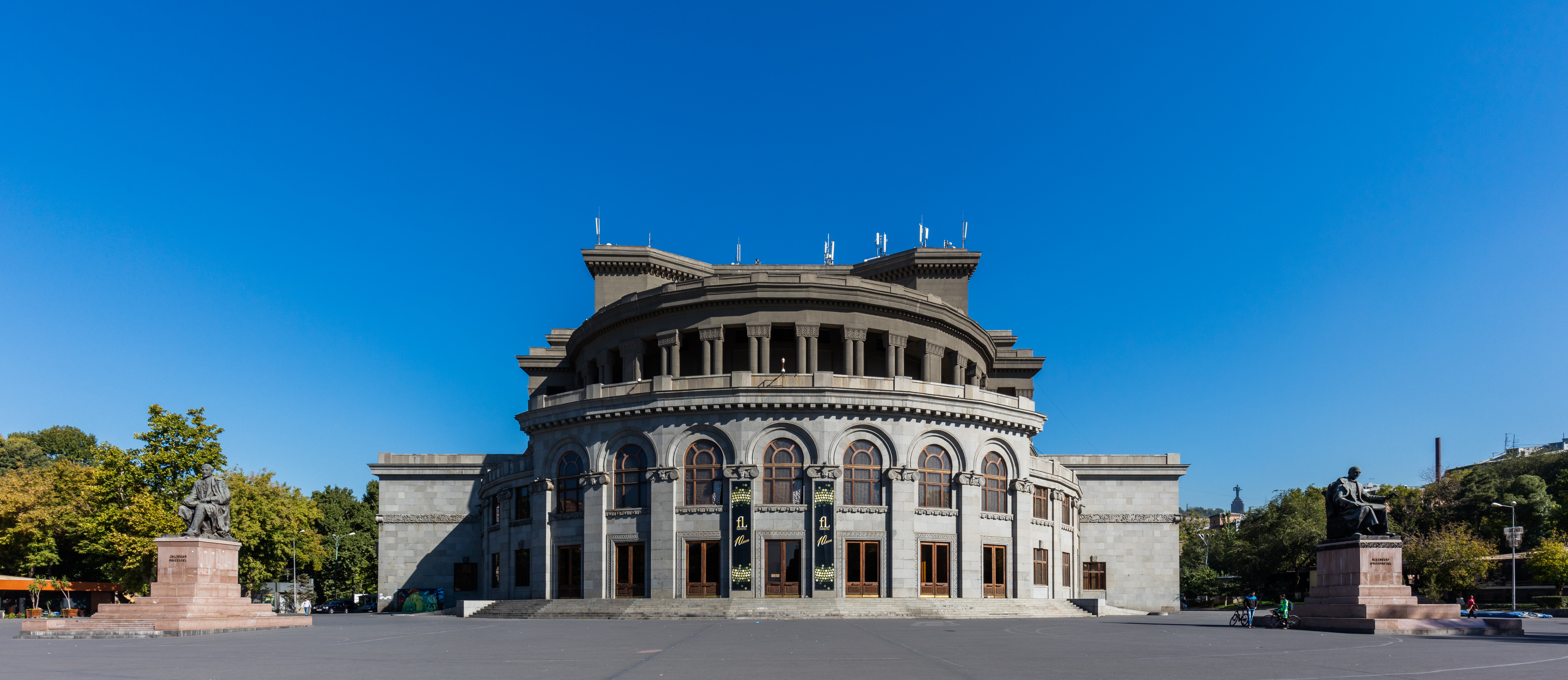
View of the rear facade.

== See also ==
- List of opera houses
- Music of Armenia
