= Pavel Lisitsian =

Soviet singer (1911–2004)

Pavel Gerasimovich Lisitsian (Russian: Павел Герасимович Лисициан, Armenian: Պավել (Պողոս) Գերասիմի Լիսիցյան; November 6, 1911 – July 6, 2004), was a Soviet baritone opera singer who performed in the Bolshoi Opera, Moscow from 1940 until his retirement from stage in 1966. People's Artist of the USSR (1956).

== Biography ==
Pavel Lisitsian was born 6 November 1911 in Vladikavkaz, Vladikavkazsky okrug, Terek Oblast, Caucasus Viceroyalty, Russian Empire.

He was born into an Armenian family living in Vladikavkaz, where his father was a mineworker. Pavel first worked in diamond drilling, then as a welder apprentice hoping to follow his father's steps. He first began to sing in a church choir before moving to Leningrad to study cello (1930).

As a strong-voiced soloist of a local amateur group he was commissioned to the Leningrad Conservatory.

He started his vocal career in the Maly Leningrad State Opera Theatre and then in the Yerevan Opera House, where he performed the leads for three years.

From 1940 to 1966, Pavel Lisitsian was the soloist of the Bolshoi Theatre and performed parts of Yeletsky, Onegin, Mazepa, and Robert (in Tchaikovsky’s The Queen of Spades, Eugene Onegin, Mazeppa, and Iolanta respectively), Germont and Amonasro (in Verdi's Traviata and Aida), Escamilo (in Bizet’s Carmen), Tatul (Spendiarov’s Almast), Arsaces II (Arshak II) (Chuhadzhyan's Arshak II), Napoleon (in Prokofiev's War and Peace), and others.

During a concert tour of the US in 1960, he appeared at the Metropolitan Opera as Amonasro. And in San Francisco, at the Cosmopolitan Opera on April 1 1960, he sang in the cast of Faust (along with Dorothy Warenskjold and Norman Treigle), in tenor Jussi Bjorling's final operatic performance before his death. Lisitsian sang his role, the soldier Valentin, in Russian while the others sang in French.

He died in Moscow at age 92.

His daughters Karina and Ruzanna are successful opera singers who frequently perform together. His grand daughter pianist Elena Lisitsian lives in New York City and his grandson Paul Asoyan lives in Encinitas, California.

== Sources ==
- (in English) Biography
- Horst Seeger, Opernlexikon, 4th ed. 1989, Henschelverlag Kunst und Gesellschaft Berlin, GDR, ISBN 3-362-00014-2 (in German)
- Oxford Music Online, Alan Blyth: "Lisitsyan, Pavel Gerasim" (subscription required)
