= Gegham Grigoryan =

Gegham Grigorian Գեղամ Գրիգորյան Гегам Григорян
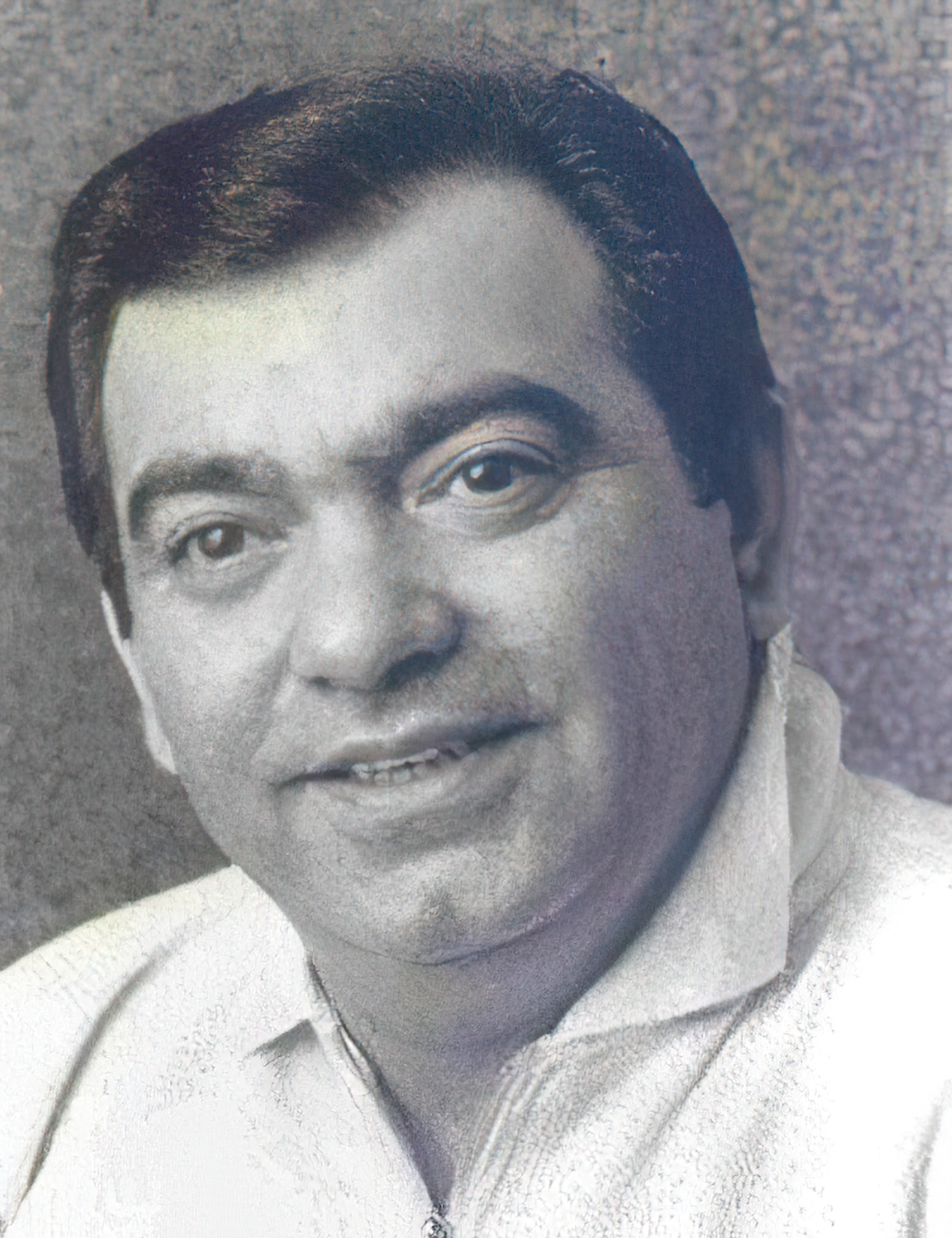
- Gegham Grigorian

Background information
- Born: 29 January 1951; Yerevan, Armenian SSR, Soviet Union
- Died: 23 March 2016 (aged 65) Yerevan, Armenia
- Occupation: Opera singer (tenor)

Gegham Grigorian (also written Grigoryan, Armenian: Գեղամ Գրիգորյան; Russian: Гегам Григорян; 29 January 1951 – 23 March 2016) was an Armenian operatic tenor. He was the father of noted operatic soprano Asmik Grigorian.

== Biography ==
Gegham Grigorian was born in Yerevan and graduated from Yerevan Komitas State Conservatory. He was a student of Professor Sergei Danielyan. Grigorian made his first appearance on the big stage in 1971, at the age of 20. In 1972, he went to West Berlin to perform in solo concerts.

In 1975, he made his debut at the National Theater of Opera and Ballet of Armenia in the role of Edgardo in Lucia di Lammermoor by Donizetti. After this, he played Saro in Armen Tigranian's Anoush, Tirit in Tigran Chukhajian's Arshak II, Sayat Nova in Alexander Arutiunian's Sayat Nova, Count Almaviva in Gioachino Rossini's Il Barbiere di Siviglia, and the titular role in Charles Gounod's Faust.

== Travel restrictions ==
By the 1970s, he was already a famous singer in the Soviet Union. In 1978, he took part in the competition of La Scala Theatre Academy in Milan and was one of the four winners who were invited to qualify for this school. During his traineeship in Italy, he participated in several concerts. At La Scala, Gegham Grigorian made his debut in the role of Pinkerton in Madama Butterfly by Giacomo Puccini. After that performance, he signed a contract with La Scala" for leading roles in the operas Boris Godunov and Tosca. The performances were to be conducted by Claudio Abbado, who was then the principal conductor of La Scala.

"But politics interfered. The Mussorgsky opera was being staged by Yuri Lyubimov, the famous Moscow director-dissident already in conflict with the government (he was later stripped of his citizenship, in 1984). The production was in rehearsals when the Soviet Union Ministry of Culture asked Grigorian to cancel his participation. As the singer described it at the time – just after the first dress rehearsal – he initially refused. But when the authorities threatened him and his family he acquiesced and departed for Russia. Subsequently he was put on the so-called restricted artists list and not allowed to leave the Soviet Union for eight years" (25 March 2016, by Maya Pritsker, Musicalamerica.com)

As written by The Telegraph on 30 March 2016: "In November that year (1979), however, he turned up in Trieste, some 250 miles east of Milan, seeking political asylum. He was living in a refugee centre while his case was being considered, but within days had vanished, failing to turn up in Milan for his appearance in Mussorgsky’s Boris Godunov on December 7."

In 1980, Virgilijus Noreika, artistic director of Lithuanian National Opera and Ballet Theatre invited Grigorian to work in Vilnius. There Grigorian worked with the famous conductor Jonas Alex. He sang in the operas Eugene Onegin, Don Carlos, Boris Godunov, La Traviata, Madama Butterfly, Rigoletto and many others.

In 1989, at the invitation of Valery Gergiev he joined the Kirov Opera (soon to be the Mariinsky Theater) as the lead singer.

Here, Grigorian was a great success. In those years, the Mariinsky Theater had just gained fame. Gegham Grigorian made a great contribution in the formation and establishment of a company of soloists under the chief conductor and artistic director Valery Gergiev.

After 1990, the Soviet Union was on the verge of collapse, and Grigorian had the opportunity to travel to foreign countries.

== Career abroad ==
"When he did eventually appear regularly in the West – under the patronage of the conductor Valery Gergiev – he thrilled audiences at Covent Garden, where his portrayal of Lensky in Tchaikovsky's Eugene Onegin was hailed as musical gold by critics, and at the Metropolitan Opera, New York, where he gave a moving account of Herman in The Queen of Spades." The critic Rodney Milnes declared him to be "one of today's great tenors", adding that in "Grigorian's Lensky you hear a century of Russian tenor tradition, inimitably plangent, firm and expressive". After a concert performance of The Queen of Spades with the BBC Philharmonic in Manchester in 2004, The Daily Telegraph noted how Grigorian "invested every fibre of his being in the obsessed Hermann", while earlier The New York Times had declared that in the same role at the Met his "characteristic concentration produced frequent haunting moments". (The Telegraph, 30 MARCH 2016)

The Soviet Union had started to disintegrate and Grigorian was now free to travel again. This stage of career of Grigorian began with debut at the Royal Concertgebouw in Amsterdam in 1990, he sang leading roles in the operas of Donizetti's Lucrezia Borgia, Puccini's La bohème, and Cilea's Adriana Lecouvreur and three years later made his Royal Opera House (London) debut in Eugene Onegin as Lensky. In 1995 he was a last-minute substitute for Luciano Pavarotti in Verdi's Un Ballo in Maschera at Covent Garden, the same year in which he appeared in New York.

He returned to the Metropolitan Opera in 2002 as Count Bezukhov in Prokofiev's War and Peace with Dmitri Hvorostovsky and Anna Netrebko, again under Gergiev. Almost 20 years after disappearing from La Scala, Grigorian returned to the Italian opera house in 1998, singing in Mussorgsky's Khovanshchina alongside Burchuladze under Gergiev, returning there in Verdi's La Forza del Destino under Riccardo Muti in 1999. In 2000, he returned to Armenia as artistic director of the Yerevan Opera Theatre, a post he held for seven years.

Grigoryan sang at all famous and big Opera Houses and concert halls. Royal Opera House ("Mazepa", "Eugene Onegin"), Metropolitan Opera ("The Queen of Spades", "Aida", "War and Peace", "Un Ballo in Maschera", "Prince Igor", "Cavalleria Rusticana", "Tosca" ), La Scala ("Madama Butterfly", "La Forza del Destino", "Boris Godunov", "Khovanshchina," "Queen of Spades", "War and Peace"), Teatro Colón Buenos Aires ("Fedora", "Pagliacci", "Il tabarro", "Norma"), Teatro dell'Opera di Roma ("Norma", "Aida", "Un Ballo in Maschera", "La Bohème", etc.), Berlin Staatsoper ("Prince Igor", "Aida", "Il Trovatore", "Queen of Spades").

Grigoryan sang in New York, Washington, Tokyo, Paris, Vienna, Munich, Berlin, Amsterdam, Monte Carlo, Geneva, Florence, Japan, etc.

Since 1990, Grigorian was a regular guest at various festivals: Chorégies d'Orange (Orange, France), at the Summer Opera Season in the Baths of Caracalla (Teatro dell'Opera di Roma, Rome, Italy), Ravenna Festival (Ravenna, Italy), Savonlinna Opera Festival (Savonlinna, Finland), Maggio Musicale Fiorentino (Florence, Italy), Festival Puccini (Torre del Lago, Italy), Salzburg Festival (Austria), and many others. In the years 1989-96 he was a member of the Committee of the artistic leadership at the Semaines Musicales de Tours Festival (France). He fulfilled all of the most difficult parts for tenors ("Rigoletto" 208 performances, "Aida" 70 productions). He has worked with all the great singers of the classic genre, who created the history of classical performance of 20th and 21st centuries: Nicolai Ghiaurov, Mirella Freni, Leontyne Price, Grace Bumbry, Ghena Dimitrova, Maria Dragoni, Luciano Pavarotti, Plácido Domingo, Leo Nucci and conductors Gergiev, Zubin Mehta, James Levine, Bruno Bartoletti, Yevgeny Svetlanov, Richter. Opera directors: Graham Vick, Konchalovsky, Zeffirelli, Del Monaco, etc.

After ten years of abroad career, Gegham Grigorian has been called one of the best tenors of the 20th century, the list of which is headed by the legendary Enrico Caruso, Beniamino Gigli, Franco Corelli.

== As artistic director ==
In 2000, the President of Armenia Robert Kocharyan invited him to be the artistic director of the Yerevan Opera Theater. He directed the theater in that position until 2007. In those years, the theater staged the following operas directed by Grigorian: Verdi's La Traviata, Tigranyan's Anush, Chukhajian's David Bek and Arshak II. Under Grigorian's leadership, the theater staged operas by invited directors, including Carmen, Norma, Aleko, Don Juan. The concert version included the following operas: Tchaikovsky's Iolanta, Mozart's The Magic Flute, and Vivaldi's Tigran the Great. The following ballets were performed: Aram Khachaturyan's Gayane, M. Mavisakalyan and L. Tchgnavoryan's Saint Hripsime and Trdat, and Shchedrin's Carmen Suite.

Bellini's Norma was filmed in the pagan temple of Garni with the artistic staff of the theater, directed by Boris Hayrapetyan and co-produced with the Union of Cinematographers of Russia. In 2015, at the request of the President of Armenia Serzh Sargsyan and the troupe of the Opera House, Gegham Grigorian returned to the National Academic Theater of Opera and Ballet as artistic director.

Grigoryan gave master classes to many students from Armenia, Russia, Ukraine, Lithuania, Georgia, USA, Canada, Syria and other countries. He died in Yerevan, aged 65.

== Recordings ==
By order of Philips Classics Records, Gegham Grigorian has recorded the following operas:

- War and Peace by Prokofiev, ASIN B002HSRYDO
- The Queen of Spades by Tchaikovsky
- Iolanta by Tchaikovsky ASIN B0000041B9
- Prince Igor by Borodin
- Sadko by Rimsky-Korsakov ASIN B000FIMG7M
- La forza del destino by Verdi ASIN B0000041KU

== Filmography ==
- The Queen of Spades (St. Petersburg, the Mariinsky Theatre),
- War and Peace (production of the Mariinsky Theater and Covent Garden, directed by Graham Vick)
- War and Peace (production of the Mariinsky Theater, the Metropolitan, La Scala, directed by Andrei Konchalovsky),
- Sadko
- La forza del destino, Version 1862 (Mariinsky Theater, 1998)
- Almast, 1985, Armenfilm
- Arshak II, 1988, Armenfilm
- Norma

== Awards and recognition ==
- Honored Artist of Lithuania (1982)
- People's Artist of the Armenian SSR (1985)
- Movses Khorenatsi Medal (2006)
- "For Services to the Homeland" Medal, first degree (2011)
- Winner of the Tchaikovsky Competition (1982)
- Winner of the Glinka Competition (1975)
- Winner of the Caucasus Musicians' Competition (1972)
- Winner of the Spendiaryan Competition (1970)
