= Tatevik Sazandaryan =

Soviet mezzosoprano and Supreme Soviet member

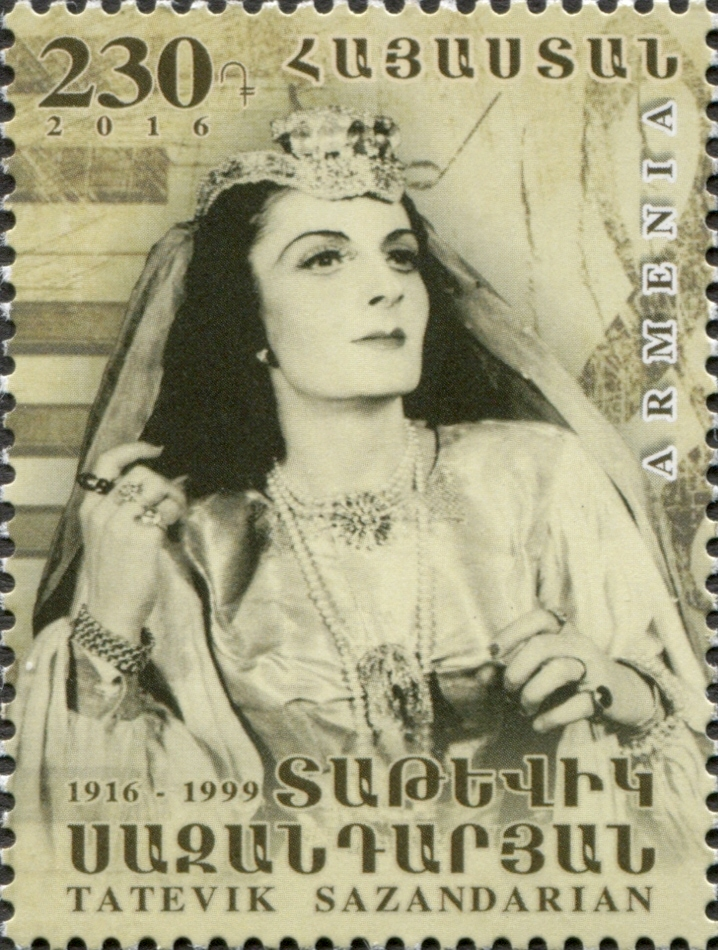
Tatevik Sazandaryan as depicted on an Armenian stamp in 2016

Tatevik Sazandaryan (Armenian: Տաթևիկ Սազանդարյան; 20 August 1916 – 6 October 1999) was a Soviet and Armenian operatic mezzo-soprano who became a member of the Supreme Soviet of the Soviet Union in 1958. She performed as a soloist at the Yerevan Opera Theatre from 1937 to 1961.

== Biography ==
Born in Khndzoresk, now located in Syunik Province, Sazandaryan grew up in Baku, singing as a soloist in the school choir from the age of 10. When she was 16, she moved to Moscow where she sang in a number of amateur performances. Once her talent was recognized, she studied in Moscow under Ruben Simonov. She began performing in concerts in 1933. She then returned to Armenia, where she studied at Yerevan's school of music and drama under Sargis Barkhudaryan. In 1937, she became a soloist at the Yerevan Opera Theatre. She is remembered in particular for playing Parandzem in Tigran Chukhajian's opera Arshak II and Tamar in Armen Tigranian's David Bek. She also performed leading roles in Carmen, Aida and Eugene Onegin.

From 1961, she taught at the Yerevan Conservatory where she became a professor in 1970. In parallel, she headed the solo singing department at the Theatre Institute of Yerevan. She gained an extensive reputation, performing in the principal cities of the USSR as well as in Persia, Sweden, Tunisia, Hungary, Syria (1956), Belgium (1958, 1962), Greece (1959), Czechoslovakia (1960), and France (1963).

Tatevik Sazandaryan died in Yerevan at the age of 83. In May 2017, a commemorative concert was held in her honor at Yerevan's National Theatre of Opera and Ballet.

== Awards ==
Sazandaryan was honored with many awards, including the Stalin Prize (1951) and the Order of St. Mesrop Mashtots (1997). In 2016 a stamp was issued on the centenary of her birth. She is shown in the role of Almast in the opera of that name by Alexander Spendiaryan.
