= Anahit Mekhitarian =

Armenian operatic soprano (born 1969)

Anahit Mekhitarian Մխիթարյան Անահիտ Анаит Мхитарян
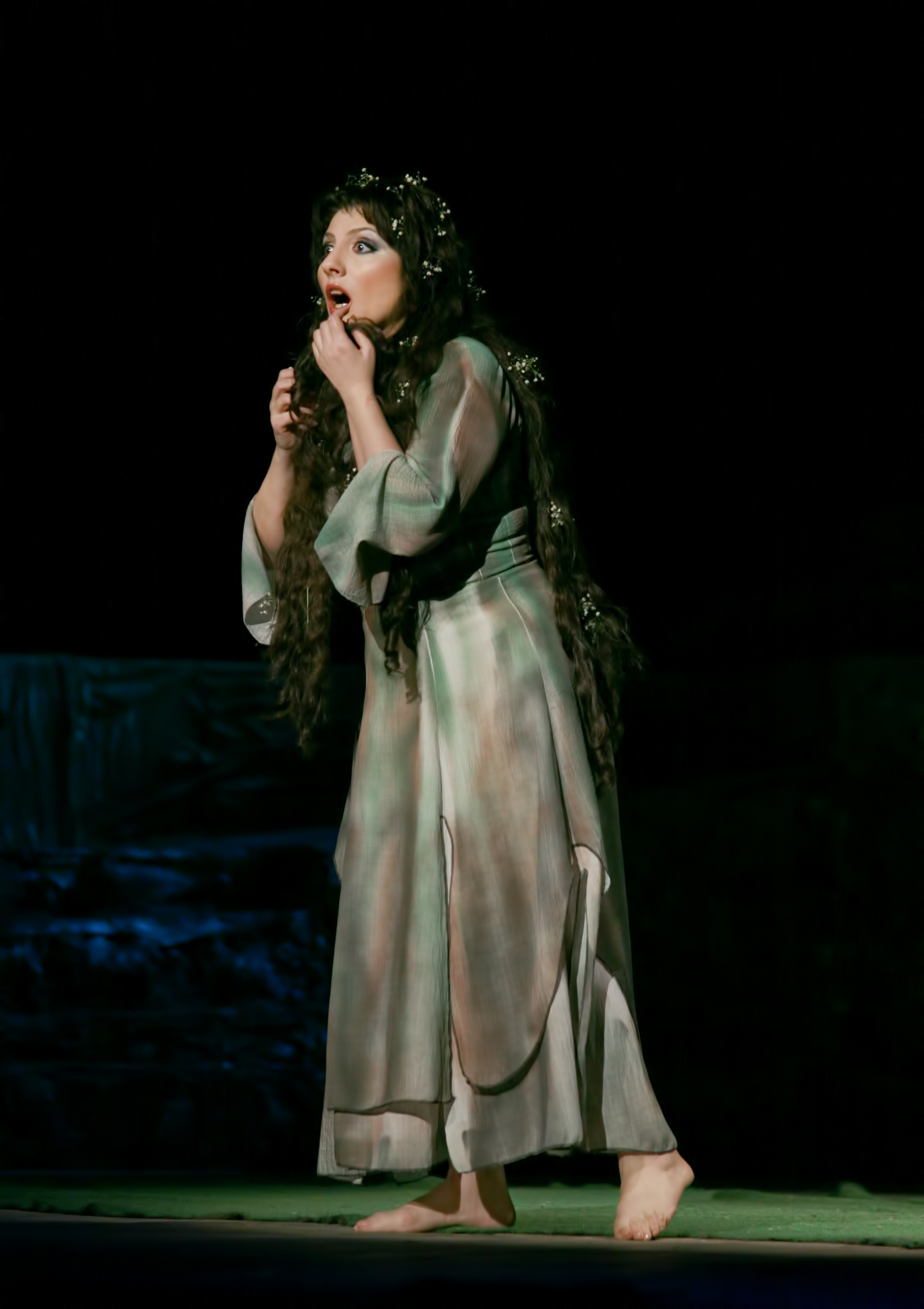
- In the title role of Armen Tigranian's opera Anoush

Background information
- Born: 6 March 1969 (age 56); Echmiadzin, Armenia
- Occupation: Opera singer (soprano)

Anahit Mekhitarian (also spelled Mkhitaryan or Mkhitarian) (Armenian: Անահիտ Մխիթարյան; Russian: Анаит Мхитарян; born 6 March 1969) is an Armenian operatic soprano. A leading soloist of the National Theater of Opera and Ballet of Armenia, she was conferred the title of Honored Artist of Armenia in 2003. In 2013 on the occasion of Republic day, she was awarded medal for Merit to the Fatherland. She has won first prize at three international singing competitions: the Francesc Viñas International Singing Competition (Spain, 1990), the Vincenzo Bellini International Competition (Italy, 1991), and the Julián Gayarre International Singing Competition (Spain, 1996).

== Life and career ==
Mekhitarian, was born in Echmiadzin, Armenia. She graduated with Honours from the Yerevan Conservatory, first in the piano department and then in the voice department.

In 1990, at the 28th International Francesc Viñas International Singing Competition in Barcelona, Spain, with Magda Oliviero as the president of the judging panel, Mekhitarian won the First Prize. Less than a year later, in 1991, she was awarded the First Prize at the 23rd Vincenzo Bellini International Competition in Sicily, with Dame Joan Sutherland as the president of the judging panel. Her third victory came in 1996, when she won the First Prize at the 6th Julián Gayarre International Singing Contest in Pamplona, Spain, with José Carreras as the president of the jury.

In the course of her career she has appeared throughout Europe as well as in North and South America, Australia, and the Middle East. Her opera appearances include the Gayarre Opera Theater (as Lucia in Lucia di Lammermoor), the Roman Theater in Mérida "Festival de Teatro Clasico" (as Paolina in Poliuto) in Seville and the Teatro Colón in A Coruña (as Desdemona in Otello), at the Shrine Auditorium in Los Angeles (as Anush in Anush), and the Bolshoi Theater in Moscow (as Norma in Norma),. She has performed concerts at the Gran Teatre del Liceu, Palau de la Música Catalana, Salle Gaveau, St John's, Smith Square, Malmö Concert Hall, Auditorio Nacional de Música, Madrid, Mariinsky Theatre in Saint Petersburg and Kolonni Zalin Moscow, amongst others.

She is a principal soloist at the National Opera and Ballet Theater of Armenia in Yerevan. In 2003 she was conferred the title of Honored Artist of Armenia. In 2009 she gave a gala concert conducted by Miquel Ortega in celebration of the 75th anniversary of National Academic Theater of Opera and Ballet in Yerevan.

Mekhitarian is married to Armen Hakobyan, a professor at the Armenian State University of Economics.

== Repertoire ==
Mekhitarian's repertoire includes these significant roles:

- Bellini: Norma (Norma)
- Bellini: I puritani (Elvira)
- Bellini: La sonnambula (Amina)
- Donizetti: Don Pasquale (Norina)
- Donizetti: Linda di Chamounix (Linda)
- Donizetti: Lucia di Lammermoor (Lucia)
- Donizetti: Poliuto (Paolina)
- Leoncavallo: Pagliacci (Nedda)
- Meyerbeer:Dinorah (Dinorah)
- Mozart: The Abduction from the Seraglio (Konstanze)
- Rossini: The Barber of Seville (Rosina)
- Tigranian: Anoush (Anoush)
- Tchouhadjian: Arshak II (Olympia)
- Tchouhadjian: Karine (Karine)
- Verdi: Otello (Desdemona)
- Verdi: Rigoletto (Gilda)
- Verdi: La traviata (Violetta)
