= Vanoush Khanamirian =

Armenian ballet and dance choreographer

Khanamirian in the title role in the ballet Spartacus

Vanoush Gerasimich Khanamirian (Armenian: Վանուշ Խանամիրյան, November 5, 1927 – October 5, 2011) was an Armenian ballet, traditional and folkloric dance choreographer.

== Career ==
Khanamirian started as a ballet dancer. His first major performance was in the wedding scene of a famous Armenian ballet production Anoush. He grew to love the art of dancing and began to play major solo parts in different ballet productions. Khanamirian became very famous, playing numerous ballet solos throughout the Asian continent and abroad. He was later appointed to be the Artistic Leader of the State Dance Ensemble of Armenia. For over twenty years Khanamirian led the Dance Ensemble of Armenia to be one of the best in the former Soviet Republic. Khanamirian managed to create and direct hundreds of different dances while he was the Artistic Leader, many of which are still being danced by dance groups around the world.

Khanamirian joined the Alexander Spendiarian Academic Theater of Opera and Ballet in 1941. In 1947, Khanamirian got his first major part as Nerso in Aram Khachaturyan's Gayane, and soon after that became one of the soloists in the Yerevan Opera Theater. Aram Khachaturyan was present at one of the concert; Khachaturyan was quoted as saying "The way Khanamirian danced made me realize how cultural and Armenian my music really is." Khanamirian became known in the Ballet Academy when he played the role of "Sasuntsi Davit," which he performed so well that a very famous Armenian sculptor at the time, Yervand Kochar, asked him to be the model for the statue of "David of Sasun," one of many famous statues in Yerevan, Armenia today. Khanamirian played in as many as twenty famous ballet productions like Arshak, Sevan, Khantoot and Marmar, but he became famous for his role in Spartacus. Khanamirian also directed three ballet productions, two of which won national awards in Moscow.

In 1968 Khanamirian was invited to Armenia's National Cultural Administration and was offered the position of the Artistic Director of the Armenian State Dance Ensemble. Khanamirian directed famous dances that symbolized thousands of years of Armenian heritage and culture, showing the real folk-lore as people's art. The capabilities of Vanoush Khanamirian as a choreographer and artistic leader were discovered with great force just in the staging of his dances, leaving such a strong impression on the audience, in spite of their seeming simplicity. Under his leadership, the Dance Ensemble of Armenia became one of the best groups in Armenia to represent Armenian cultural dance. The ensemble traveled to almost every continent around the world from the '70s to the '80s (11 states in America), sometimes doing sixty concerts in sixty days. Khanamirian lead the ensemble until his retirement in the early '90s.

== Personal life ==
Khanamirian lived with his wife in Yerevan. In 2001 he was put in charge of the Union of Art of Dance Workers of Armenia.
