= Kharatyan =

Kharatyan (Armenian: Խառատյան) is an Armenian surname that may refer to

- Dmitry Kharatyan (born 1960), Russian actor of Armenian descent
- Hranush Kharatyan (born 1952), Armenian ethnographer
- Rudolf Kharatyan (born 1947), Armenian ballet dancer, choreographer and painter
