= Martiros Saryan =

Armenian painter

- Մարտիրոս Սարյան
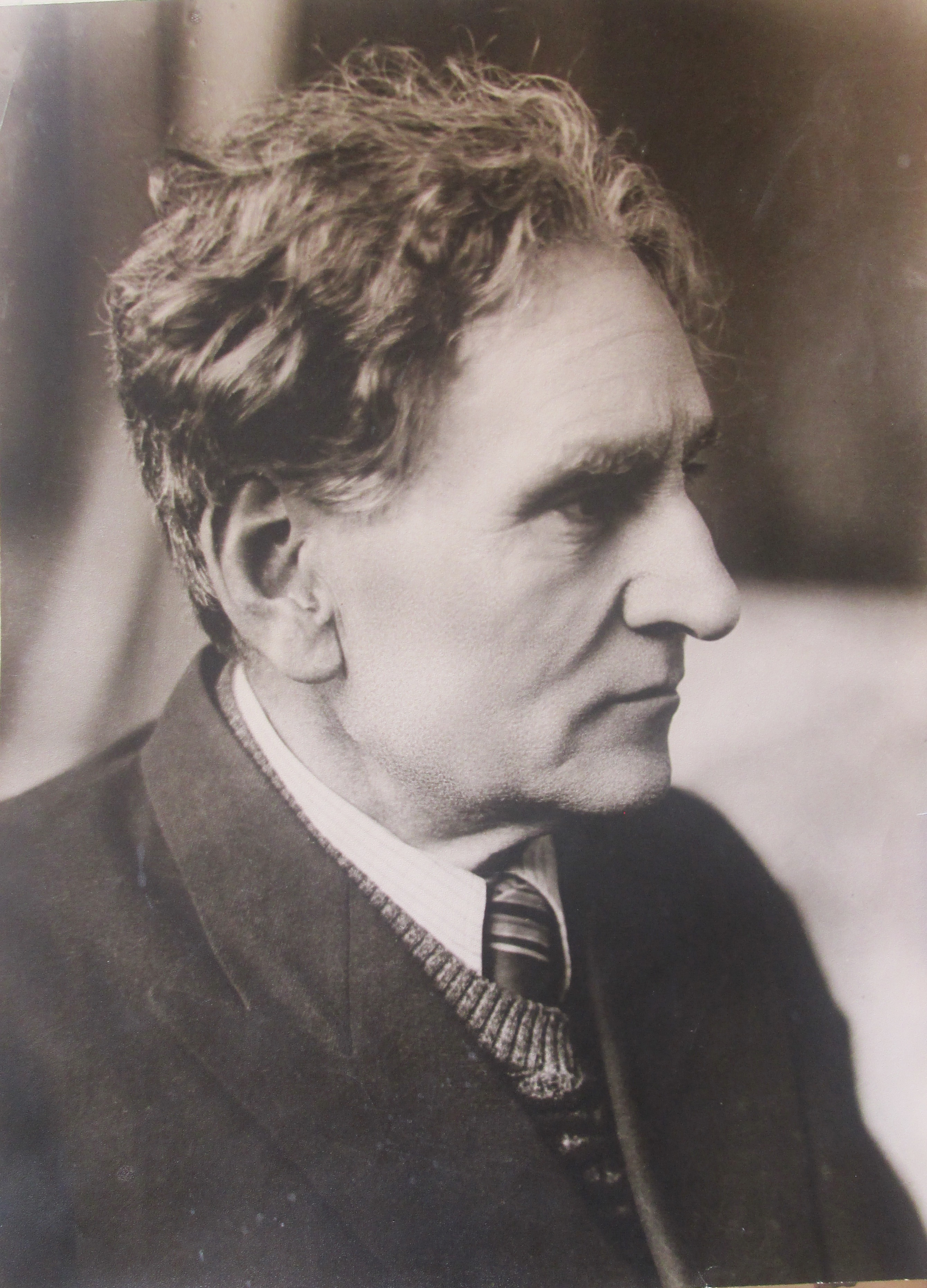
- Martiros Saryan in 1941
- Born: 28 February [O.S. 16 February] 1880; Nakhichevan-on-Don, Don Voisko Oblast, Russian Empire
- Died: 5 May 1972 (aged 92); Yerevan, Armenian SSR, Soviet Union
- Education: Moscow School of Painting, Sculpture and Architecture
- Known for: Painter
- Notable work: Armenia, Morning at Stavrino, Burning Heat with a Dog Running, and In the Grove at Sambek
- Spouse: Lusik (Aghayan) Saryan
- Children: Sargis Saryan, Ghazaros Saryan
- Awards: People's Painter of the USSR; Hero of Socialist Labour; Stalin Prize (1941); Lenin Prize; Order of Lenin (3 times)

Martiros Saryan (Armenian: Մարտիրոս Սարյան; Russian: Мартиро́с Сарья́н; 28 February [O.S. 16 February] 1880 – 5 May 1972) was an Armenian painter, People's Artist of the USSR (1960), member of the USSR Academy of Fine Arts (1947), president of the Artists' Union of Soviet Armenia (1945-1951), the founder of a modern Armenian national school of painting.

Born in Nakhichevan-on-Don, Saryan attended the local school and graduated from the New Nakhichevan Russian-Armenian College. His works were mainly inspired by his travels to Armenia and the Middle East. Saryan permanently moved to Armenia after the establishment of ASSR. His works were exhibited in Moscow, Venice, Yerevan, Paris, Brussels and other cities.

Saryan is also famous for his work in theater, especially his set and costume designs for many prominent plays and operas such as "Almast," "Davit Bek," and so on. During his time in the Armenian State Theater, he painted his well-known landscape "Armenia" and numerous portraits of Armenian actors, artists, and writers.

He was one of the members of the art association ‘The Four Arts’, which existed in Moscow and Leningrad in 1924-1931.

== Biography ==
=== Personal life ===
Saryan was born into an Armenian family in Nakhichevan-on-Don (now part of Rostov-on-Don, Russia), where Armenians from Crimea lived. He was the seventh child of Sargis Saryan and Ustian Chiligaryan. He received early education from his eldest brother, Hovhannes Saryan, who taught him Armenian and Russian writing and basic math. Saryan spent his childhood in his father's khutor (a single-homestead rural settlement of Eastern Europe), 40 kilometers from the city. His years there greatly influenced his admiration of nature, which he mentions in his autobiography. Saryan was 11 years old when his father died. His brother Hovhannes, who was twenty years older, started caring for the younger siblings.

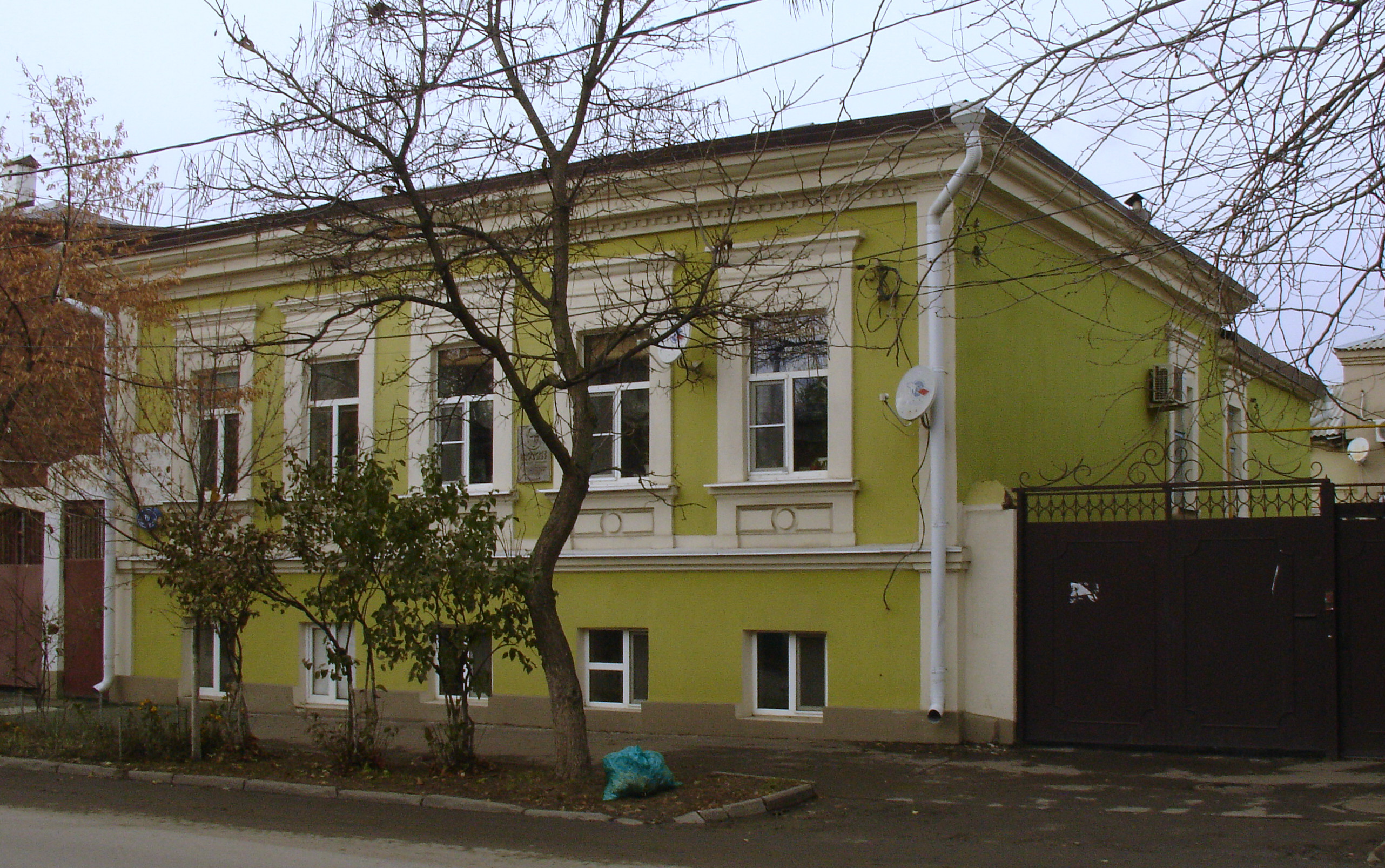
House in Rostov-on-Don where Saryan lived from 1919 to 1921. Young Martiros Saryan

During one of his travels in Tbilisi, he met his future wife, Lusik Aghayan, the daughter of famous Armenian writer Ghazaros Aghayan. He immediately fell in love with her and married her a year later, on April 17, 1916. Together they had two sons, Sargis Saryan and Ghazaros Saryan. Lusik is said to have been Saryan's one and only romantic partner.

Saryan died in Yerevan on 5 May 1972. His former home in Yerevan is now a museum dedicated to his work with hundreds of items on display. He was buried in Yerevan at the Pantheon next to Komitas Vardapet.

His son Ghazaros (Lazarus) Saryan was a composer and educator. His great-granddaughter Mariam Petrosyan is also a painter, as well as a cartoonist and award-winning novelist.

=== Travels and Inspirations ===
Saryan's artistic journey evolved as he began traveling extensively. He first visited Armenia, then part of the Russian Empire, in 1901, visiting Lori, Shirak, Echmiadzin, Haghpat, Sanahin, Yerevan and Sevan. Saryan started his artistic research aiming for an inspiration from his homeland, which he was seeing for the first time.

In 1903, after he graduated from the Moscow School of Painting, Sculpture, and Architecture, he traveled to Armenia again, visiting Ani, Goshavank, Haghpat, Sanahin, and Gharakilisa (now Vanadzor), before also traveling to Georgia. His engagement with Armenian intellectuals deepened over the years. In January 1909, while in Moscow, he met prominent Armenian thinkers Vahan Teryan, Aleksandr Tsaturyan, Levon Shant, and Derenik Demirchyan, further shaping his artistic and intellectual pursuits.

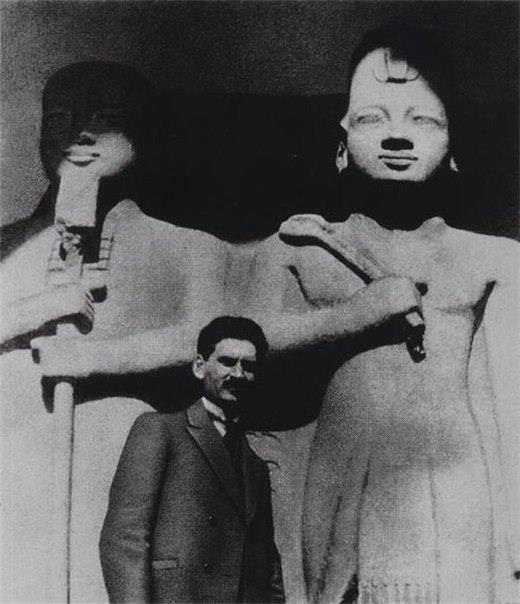
Saryan in Egypt

From 1910 to 1913 he traveled extensively in Turkey, Egypt and Iran. In 1910, he went to Constantinople (current Istanbul) and lived with an Armenian family in Bera (current Beyoğlu). There, he met writers Daniel Varuzhan and Siamanto. In 1911, he went to Alexandria (Egypt) and spent time in Cairo, Giza, Memphis, and Luxor. In 1913, he spent time in Iran, visiting Bandar-e-Anzeli, Rasht, Qazvin and Tehran.

After returning to Moscow, he opened "The Society for the Preservation of Ancient Armenian Monuments," which worried about issues around the reconstruction of Echmiadzin Cathedral . In 1915, he went to Echmiadzin again to help refugees who had fled from the Armenian genocide in the Ottoman Empire.

In 1916, when he traveled to Tbilisi and met his wife, he also helped organize the Society of Armenian Artists. Following the Bolshevik seizure of power in 1917, he went with his family to live in Russia. From 1926 to 1928 he lived and worked in Paris, but most works from this period were destroyed in a fire on board the boat on which he returned to the Soviet Union. From 1928 until his death, Saryan lived in Soviet Armenia.

With traveling and being inspired by the places and people he met, Saryan created around 4000 artworks in his lifetime.

=== Education and Career ===
Saryan studied at the New Nakhichevan Russian-Armenian College for six years, completing his education there in 1895 at the age of 15. From 1897 to 1904 he studied at the Moscow School of Painting, Sculpture and Architecture, including in the workshops of Valentin Serov and Konstantin Korovin. During this period he actively exhibited his works in various shows, including the Blue Rose Exhibit in Moscow. He was heavily influenced by the works of French artists Paul Gauguin and Henri Matisse, who also drew their inspiration from the East.

He composed his first landscapes depicting Armenia: Makravank, 1902; Aragats, 1902; Buffalo. Sevan, 1903; Evening in the Garden, 1903; In the Armenian village, 1903, etc., which were highly praised in the Moscow press.

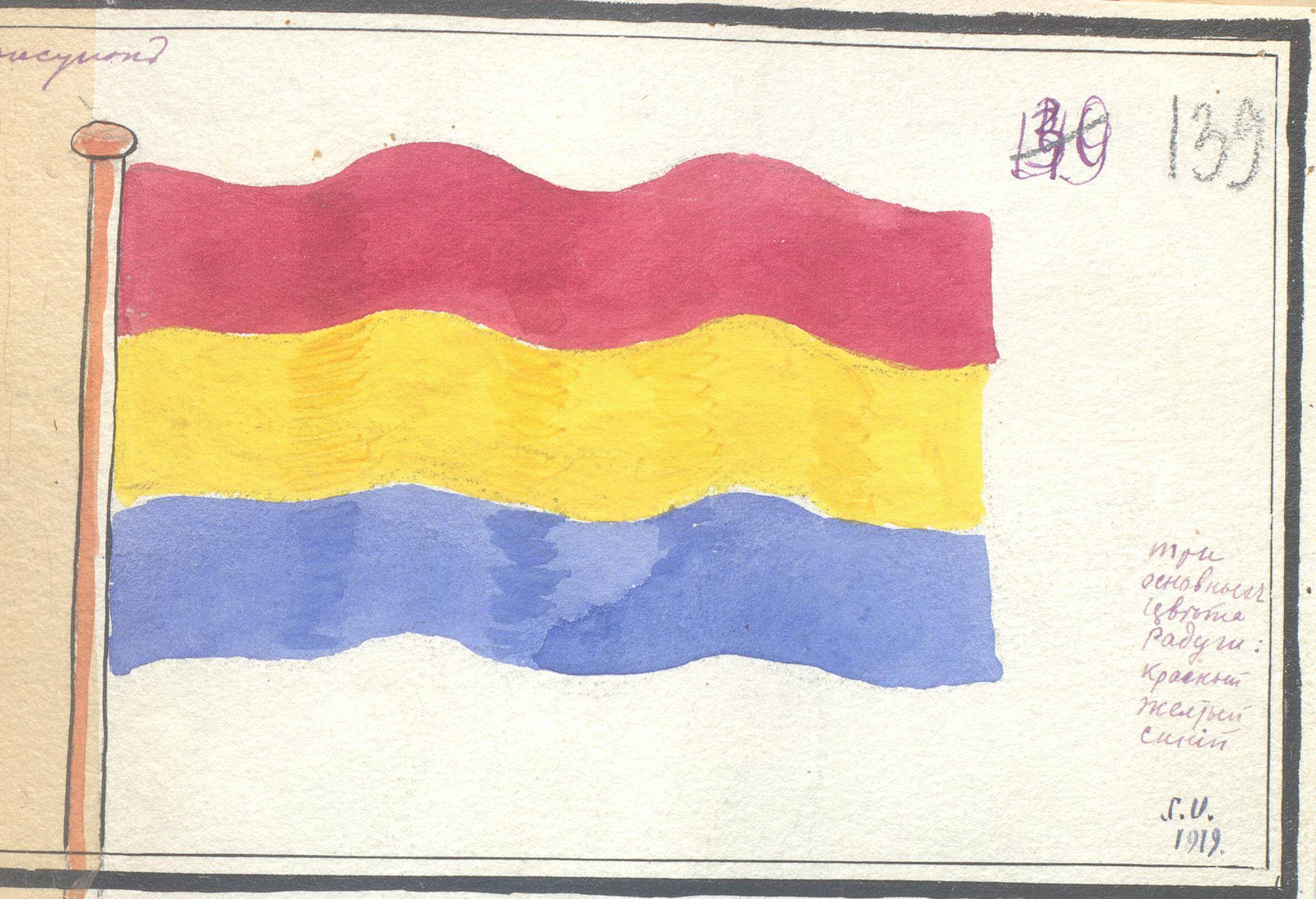
Proposal for the Flag of Armenia 1919

Following the Bolshevik seizure of power in 1917, he went with his family to live in Russia. Saryan permanently moved to Armenia after the establishment of the Armenian Soviet Socialist Republic. While most of his work reflected the Armenian landscape, he also designed the coat of arms for the Armenian SSR and designed the curtain for the first Armenian state theatre. After its establishment, the first Armenian State Theater (now known as the Sundukyan State Academic Theatre) needed a designer and artist-advisor. Saryan, who had previously assisted with the theater's interior design, accepted the position after an invite and officially joined the staff. During his tenure, Saryan also created the first emblem of the state theater. He also made a proposal for the flag of this independent Armenia based on the colors and designs of traditional Armenian fabrics and carpets, although his design was rejected.

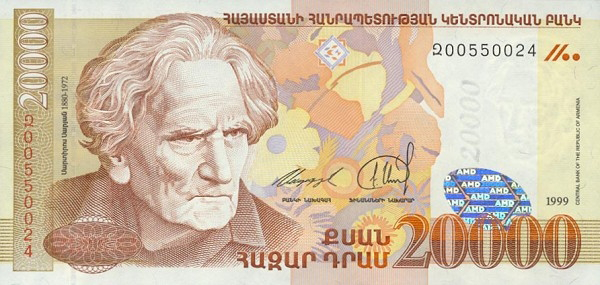
Saryan on a 1999 20000 Dram banknote

In the 1930s, during Stalin's Great Purge, many Soviet intellectuals were considered "enemies of the state." Many of Saryan's works, including portraits of famous Armenian writers and artists, were taken from the National Gallery of Armenia and burned. However, one of the works that was supposed to be destroyed was in a different museum and survived. That work was the portrait of Yeghishe Charents, an Armenian poet, writer, and public activist.

During those years, he mainly devoted himself again to landscape and portrait painting. He was also chosen as a deputy to the Supreme Soviet of the Soviet Union and was awarded the Order of Lenin three times along with other awards and medals. He was a member of the USSR Art Academy (1974) and Armenian Academy of Sciences (1956). In 1966, Saryan signed a petition supporting the unification of Nagorno-Karabakh with Soviet Armenia, alongside Yervand Kochar, Paruyr Sevak, Hamo Sahyan, and other major Armenian cultural figures.

In 1939, Saryan designed the set and costumes for "Almast" by Alexander Spendiaryan, the first opera staged in Armenia. Starting in 1916, Spendiaryan, Saryan, and Armenian writer Hovhannes Tumanyan began to work on the opera. Tumanyan inspired Spendiaryan to create the opera based on his poem "The Capture of Fort Tmuk." Saryan agreed to design the entire set, decorations, and costumes for it.

In around 80 years of creative career, Saryan worked with different genres as a painter, graphic artist, book illustrator, theater set, and monument panel designer.

== Gallery ==
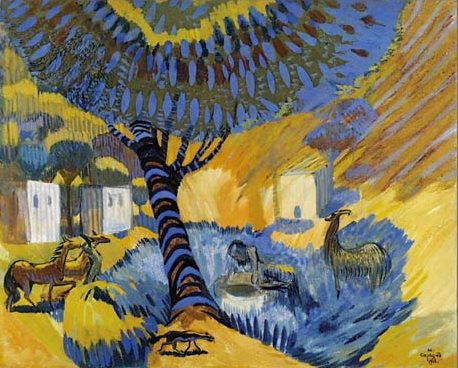
By the Well. Hot Day (1908)

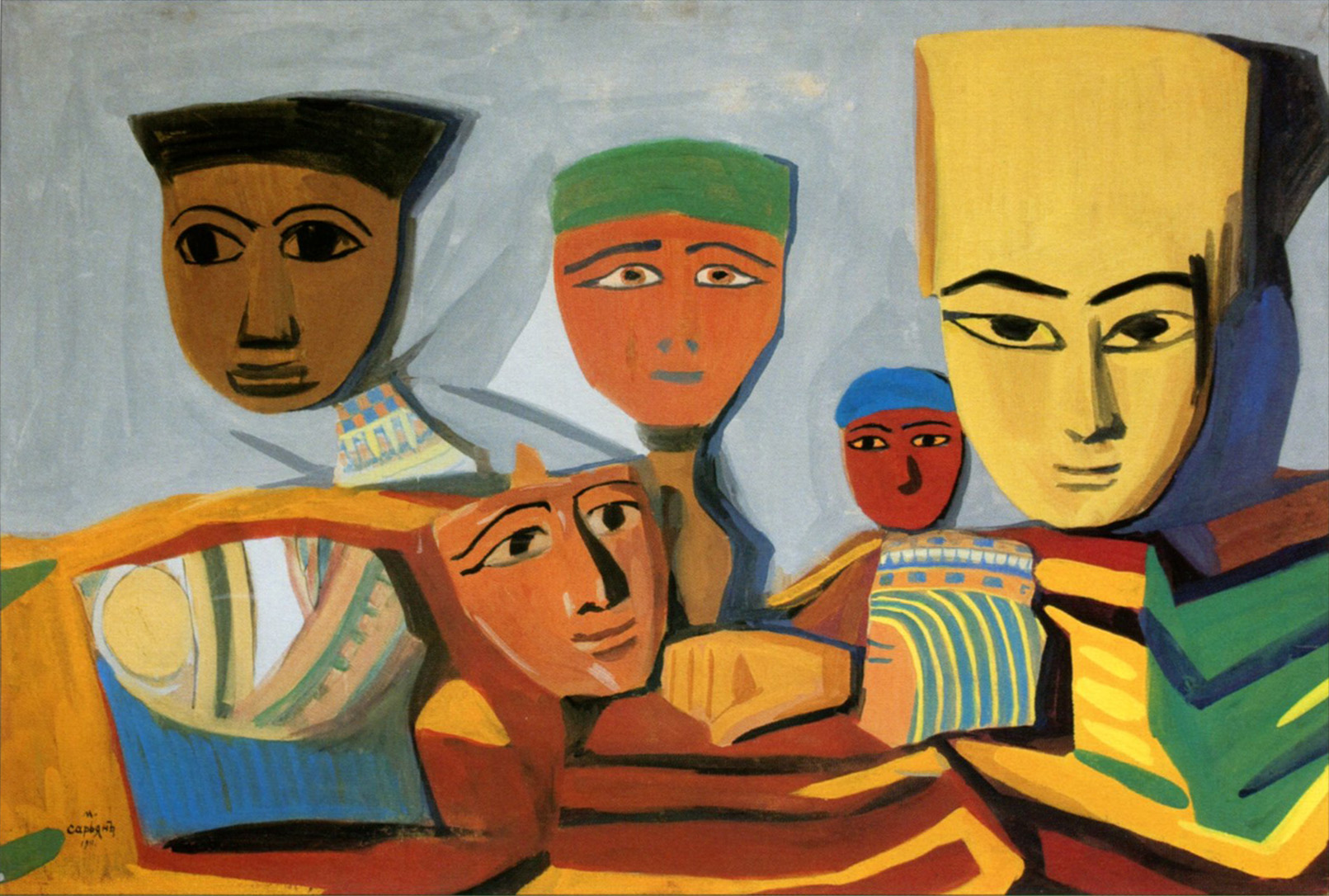
Egyptian Masks. (1911)

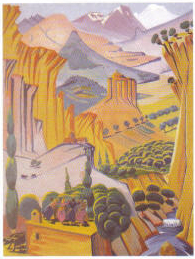
Armenia. (1923)

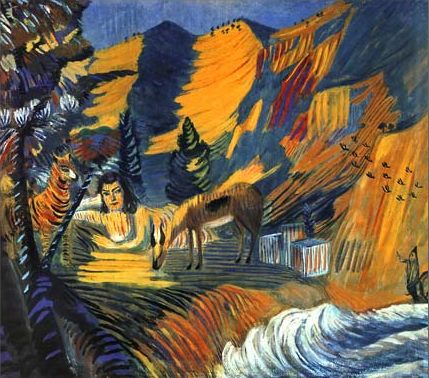
By the Sea. Sphinx (1908)

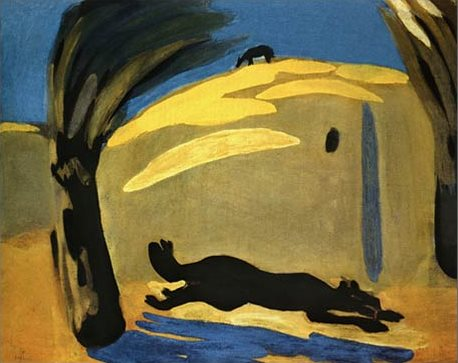
Running Dog. (1909)

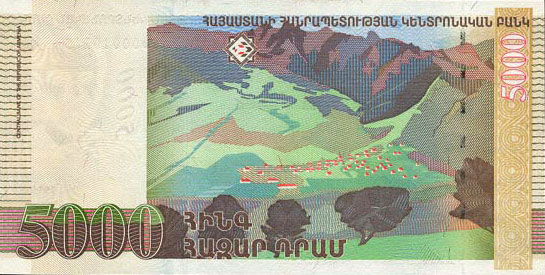
The reverse of the 1999 5000 Dram banknote bears a Lori landscape painting by Saryan

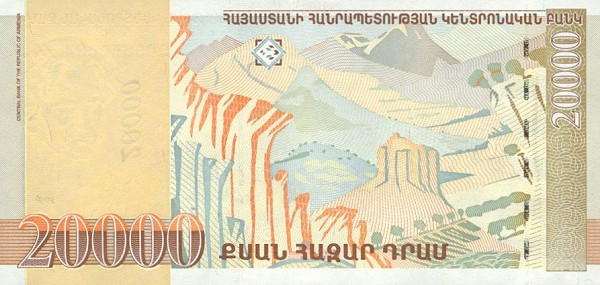
The reverse of the 1999 20000 Dram banknote shows Saryan's Armenia painting

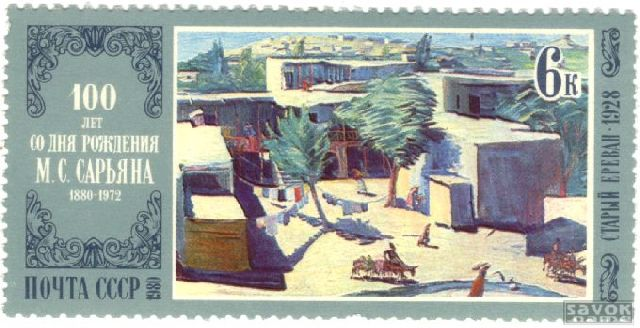
Old Yerevan, 1928 by Saryan on Soviet stamp of 1980

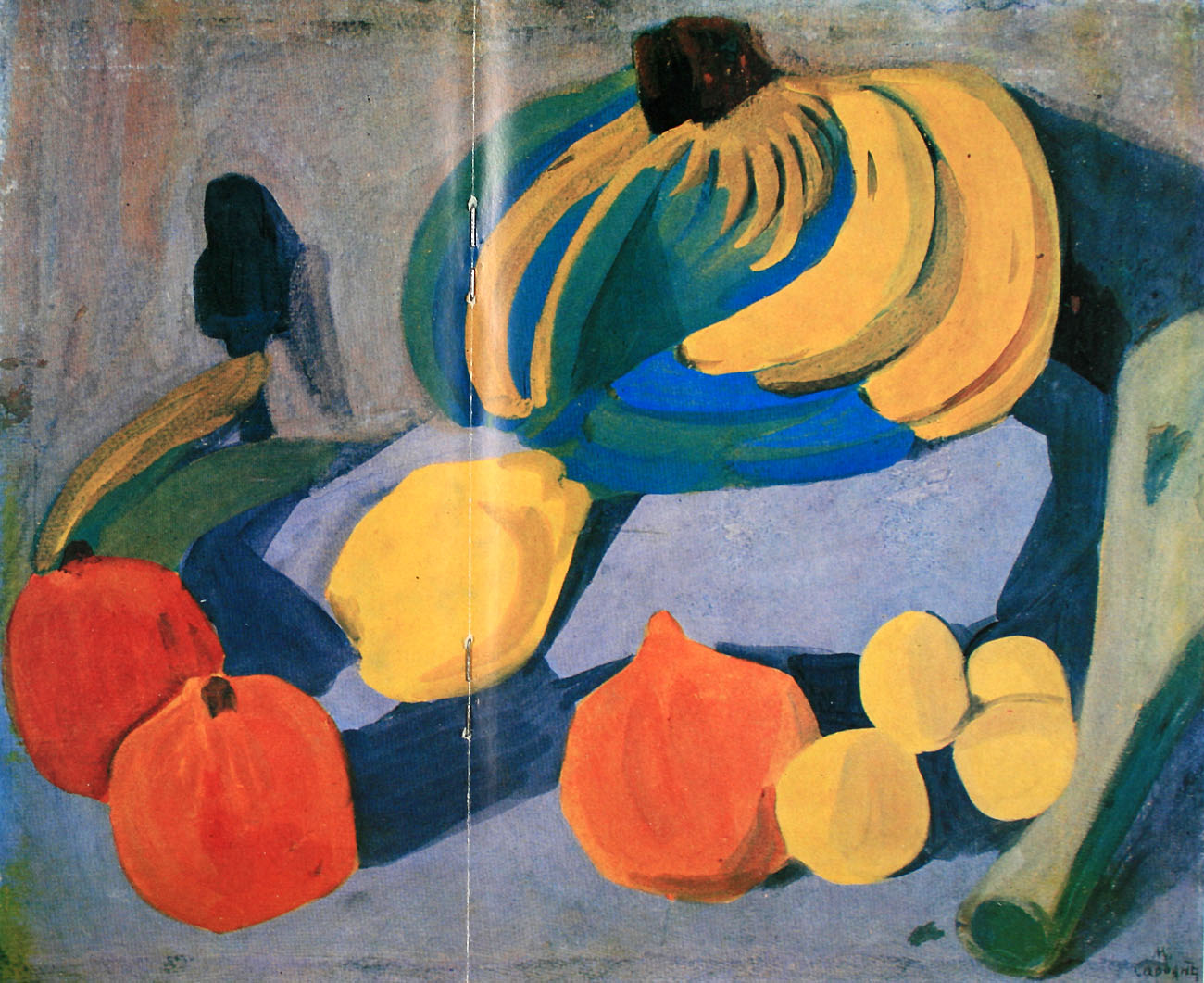
Still Life with Bananas. (1911)

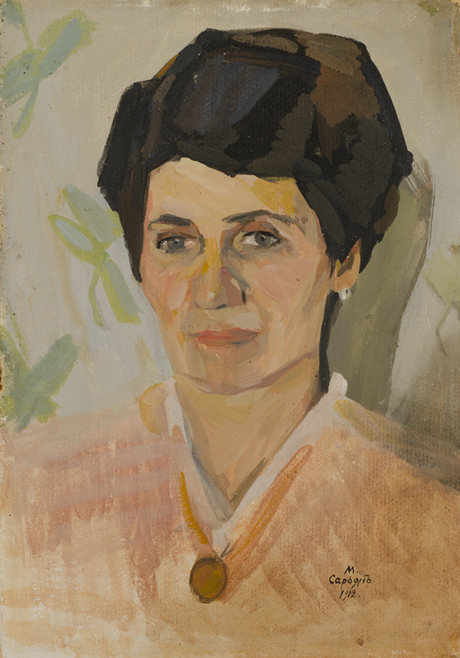
Portrait of M. D. Manucharyan. (1912)

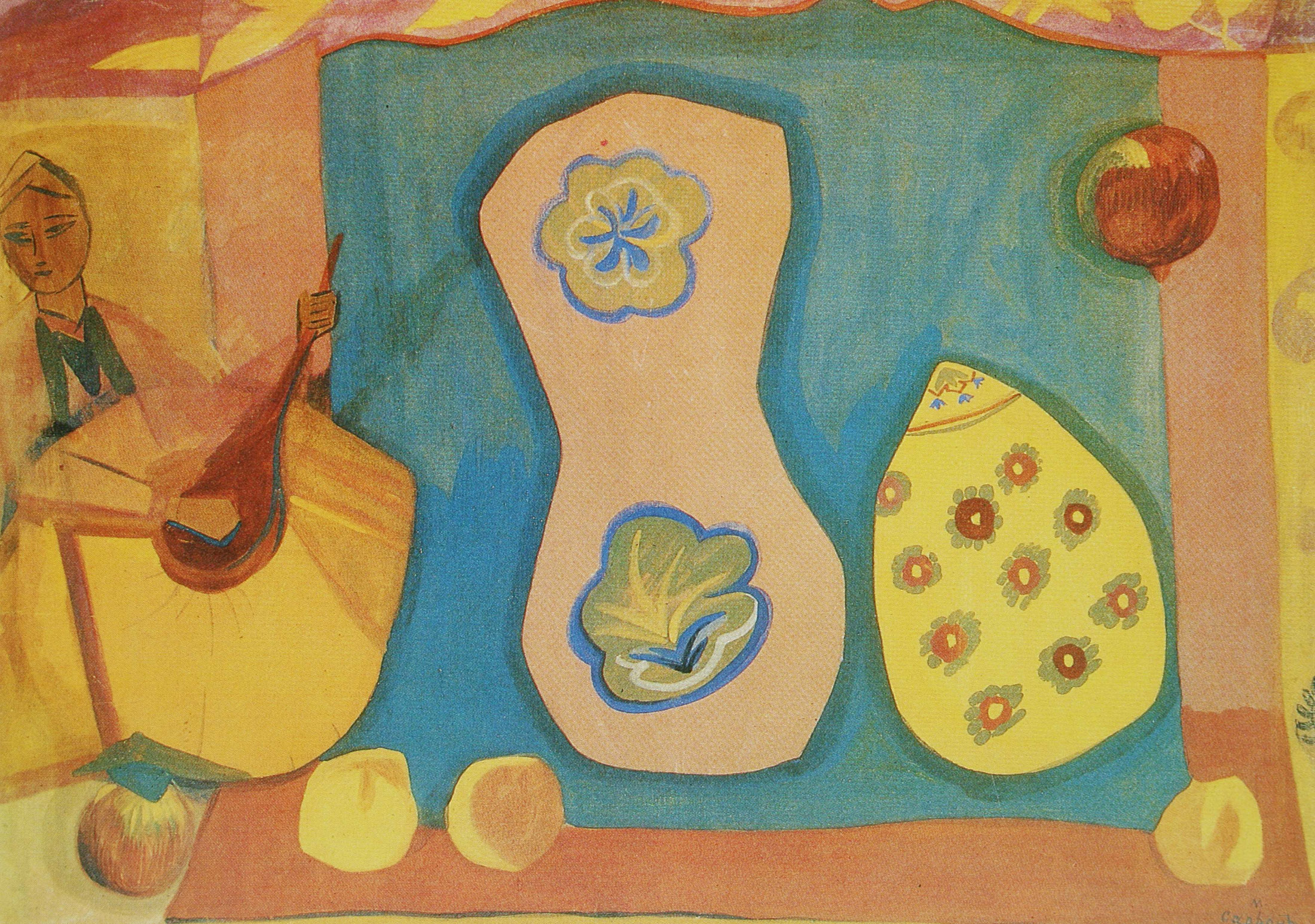
Armenian Woman, Playing Tar. (1915)

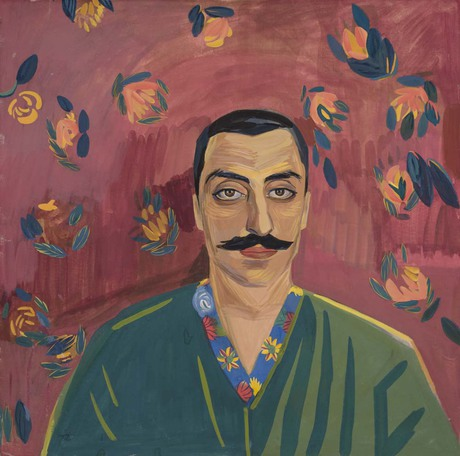
Portrait of Hovsep Mantashyan. (1915)

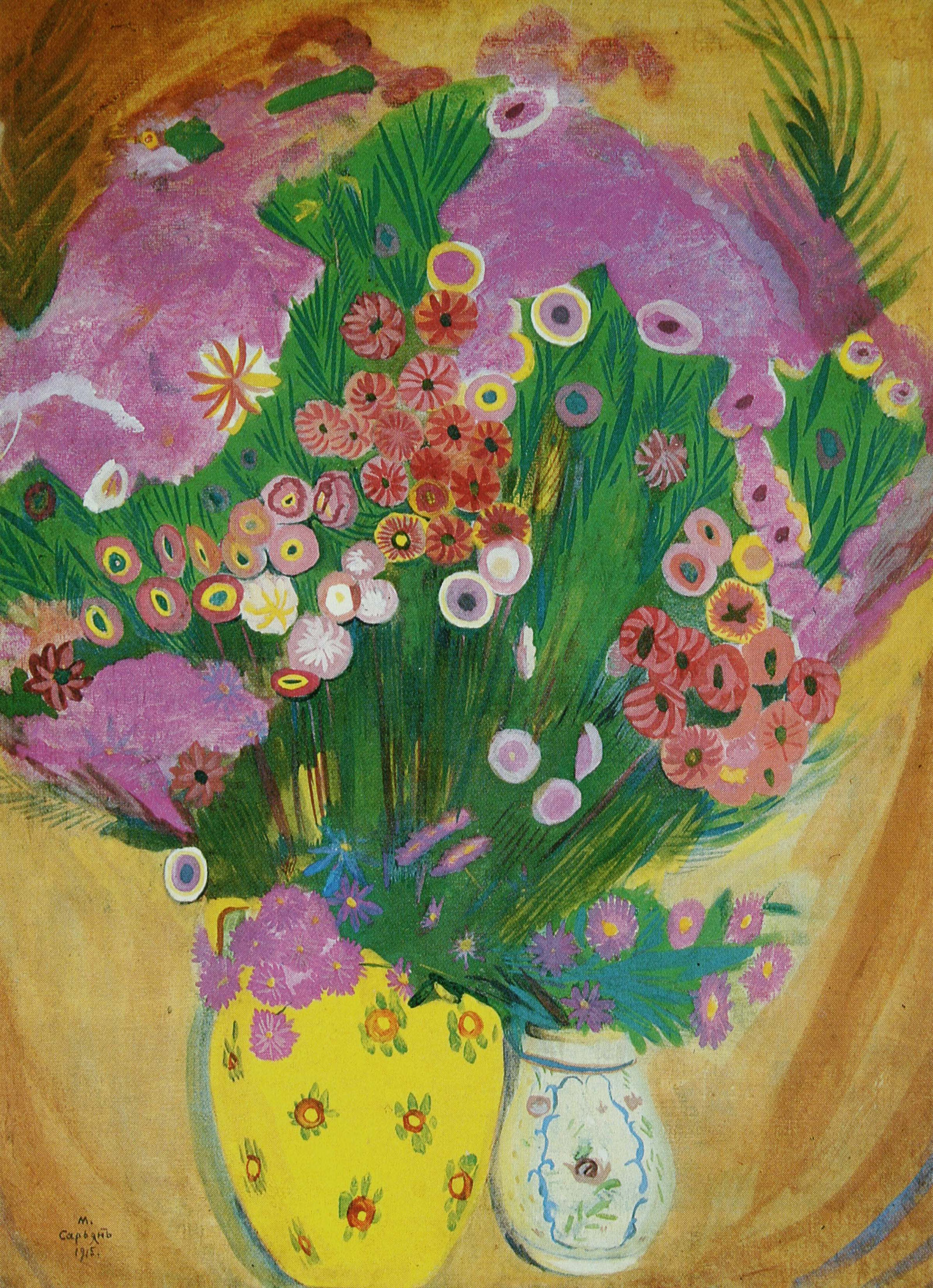
Asiatic Flowers. (1915)

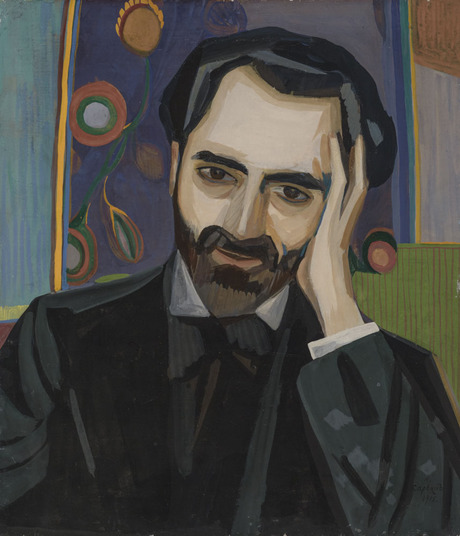
Portrait of the Poet Alexander Tsaturyan. (1915)

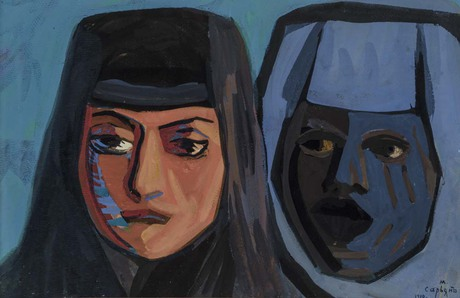
Turkish Woman and Egyptian Woman. (1910)

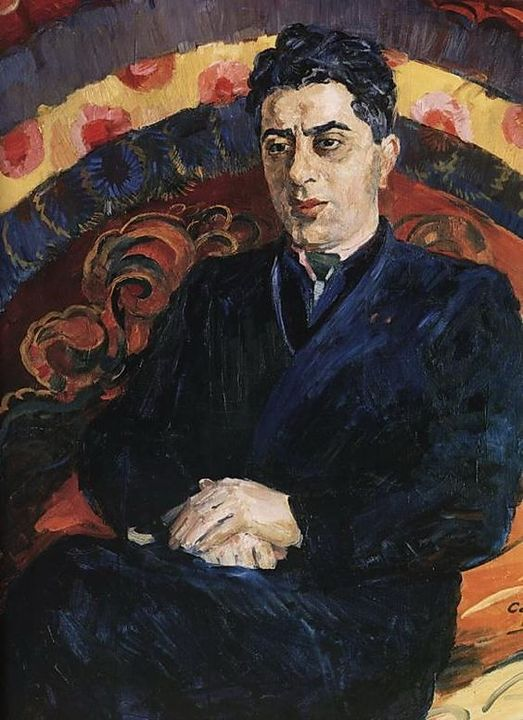
Portrait of Aram Khachaturian. (1944)
