= Nikolai Klenovsky =

Russian conductor and composer (1857–1915)

Nikolai Semyonovich Klenovsky (Russian: Николай Семёнович Кленовский; 1853 or 1857 – 6 July [O.S. 23 June] 1915) was a Russian conductor and composer.

== Life ==
Klenovsky was born in Odesa. He studied composition with Pyotr Ilyich Tchaikovsky and violin with Jan Hřímalý at the Moscow Conservatory, where he graduated from in 1879. He helped Nikolai Rubinstein prepare for the premiere of Tchaikovsky's opera Eugene Onegin. Alongside directing the Moscow University Orchestra, Klenovsky conducted at the Bolshoi Theater from 1883 to 1893. He moved to Tbilisi in 1893 where he continued to conduct music. There he also took charge of the Russian Musical Society's local branch. The conductor was a deputy director of the Saint Petersburg Imperial Chapel from 1902 to 1906. Klenovsky performed in concerts of the local Russian Musical Society branch, where he conducted the premiere of Antonín Dvořák's New World Symphony and Vasily Kalinnikov's 2nd Symphony. He died in Petrograd.

== Works ==
Klenovsky earned praise from Tchaikovsky. Most of his works remained unpublished. Ivan Vsevolozhsky first offered Klenovsky The Queen of Spades for an opera, before being passed to Villanov and to Tchaikovsky (who completed it). He issued an anthology in 1895, which was later reprinted in Moscow in 1925. His three ballets, which were Prelesti gashisha (1885), Svetlana (1886), and Salanga (1900), were successful. The composer collected and harmonized folk songs with Yuly Melgunov. Klenovsky composed four cantatas, a piano suite, Georgian songs, and Georgian liturgy set to Georgian and Russian texts.
