= Rudolf Kharatyan =

Armenian dancer (born 1947)

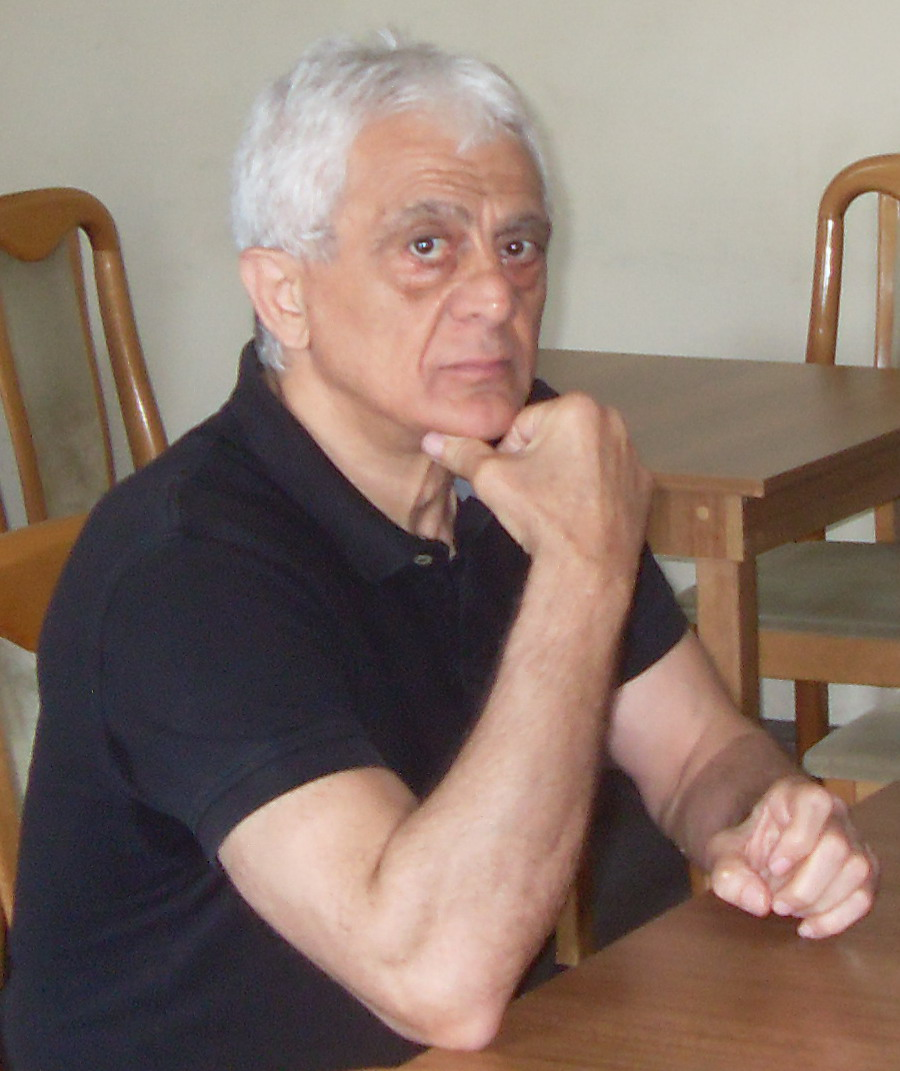

Roudolf Gurgeni Kharatian (Armenian: Ռուդոլֆ Գուրգենի Խառատյան, born April 1, 1947, in Yerevan) is an Armenian ballet dancer, choreographer, teacher, director and painter. He is a People's Artist of Armenia (2012). He is the Principal Choreographer and artistic director of the National Ballet of Armenia at the Spendiaryan National Opera and Ballet Theatre.

== Biography ==
SHORT BIO: In 1966 he graduated from the Yerevan College of Choreography (Maxim Martirosyan's studio). He holds a master's degree in Choreography and Stage Production from the Moscow Theater Art Institute. He is a graduate of the Vaganova Ballet Academy in St. Petersburg where he studied with the legendary teacher Pushkin alongside classmate Mikhail Baryshnikov. From 1967 to 1990 he has been a principal dancer of the Armenian National Academic Theater of Opera and Ballet. From 1979 to 1991 he headed the art department of the Chamber Ballet of Armenia. Kharatyan headed the dance department of the Yerevan School of the Arts from 1973 to 1979. He toured the world with the Bolshoi Ballet and Stars of the Russian Ballet. In 1999, he founded "ARKA" Ballet (ARKA is the Armenian word for "king") in Washington, D.C., as its artistic director. The company debuted in April 1999 at the Kennedy Center. From 1991 to 1994 he taught at the Kirov Academy of Ballet and from 1994 to 2007 he was the chief instructor of classical dance at the Washington Ballet School. From 2009 to 2014, Kharatian was the artistic director of the National Ballet of Armenia. Kharatian is also a painter. He had individual exhibitions in the United States and Canada.

BIO Roudolf Kharatian has had an illustrious career as dancer, choreographer, teacher and director. A recipient of numerous awards and medals, Kharatian holds a master's degree in Choreography and Stage Production from the Moscow University of Theatre Arts (GITIS). He is a graduate of the Vaganova Ballet Academy in St. Petersburg where he studied with the legendary teacher Pushkin alongside classmate Mikhail Baryshnikov. As principal dancer with the National Ballet of Armenia from 1967 to 1991, he toured the world with the Bolshoi Ballet and Stars of the Russian Ballet. He was artistic director of the Chamber Ballet of Armenia from 1979 to 1991, and headed the dance department of the Yerevan School of the Arts from 1973 to 1979. In 2009, Kharatian was invited to lead the National Ballet of Armenia at the Spediaryan Opera and Ballet Theater as its artistic director, a position he held until 2014. He is the founder and artistic director of ARKA Ballet in Washington, D.C. He is also the founder and president of the Ballet 2021 Foundation and artistic director of Ballet 2021. In 2015, Roudolf Kharatian created a special international ballet company under the aegis of Ballet 2021, comprising dancers from France, Greece, Israel, Japan, the United States and Armenia for the creation of a full-length ballet 'Two Suns' to mark the centennial commemoration of the Armenian Genocide. The company was based in Yerevan for the entire year.

A renowned master teacher, Kharatian has taught for the Kirov Ballet, American Ballet Theatre, the Boston Ballet, The Washington Ballet, Tulsa Ballet, the Youth Ballet of Brazil, the Debra Colker Dance Company, the North Carolina School of the Arts, among others. He has also worked with the Duke Ellington School of the Arts in Washington, DC, the Peabody Preparatory in Baltimore, and with Les Ballets Classiques de Montreal and Ballet Divertimento in Montreal, Canada. Kharatian served on the faculty of Washington's Kirov Academy for three years (1991 to 1994) and that of The Washington School of Ballet for thirteen years (1994 to 2007). He was invited back to the Kirov Academy as guest instructor in spring 2009 and was on the faculty of CityDance Centre at Strathmore and company teacher for CityDanceEnsemble for two years (2007–2009) prior to accepting the position of artistic director of the National Ballet of Armenia. Under his coaching and guidance, Kharatian's students have garnered top honors at prestigious international ballet competitions and gone on to successful careers with some of the world's foremost companies including the Kirov Maryinsky Ballet, the Royal Ballet, the Dutch National Ballet, the Royal Danish Ballet, New York City Ballet, American Ballet Theatre, San Francisco Ballet, and many more.

A prolific choreographer, Kharatian is the creator of over 100 original works ranging from avant‐garde / experimental to classical. Kharatian's ballets, which include one‐act ballets, concert pieces and full‐length works, have been performed on stages worldwide. Kharatian is a frequent guest lecturer and panelist, speaking about a broad range of ballet and movement‐related topics. He has been a featured panelist on the Critic's Panel at the annual Dance Critics of America conference. Roudolf Kharatian was appointed artistic director of the National Ballet of Armenia October 1, 2009. Since April 2014, Kharatian is resident choreographer of the National Ballet of Armenia.

In addition to his work in ballet, Kharatian has extensive experience in television, film, theatre and opera. He was the Creative Producer and permanent member of the jury of the inaugural season of the hit ShantTV show 'So You Think You Can Dance Armenia - Պարիր, թե կարող ես'. Kharatian is also an accomplished and celebrated visual artist; his paintings are in private collections in the U.S., Canada, Belgium, France, Germany, Great Britain, South Africa, Russia, and Armenia. [www.roudolfkharatian.com]

== Selected roles ==
- Spartacus, Aram Khachaturian's "Spartacus"
- Romeo, Sergey Prokofiev's "Romeo and Juliet"
- Albrecht, in Giselle
- Siegfried, Pyotr Tchaikovsky's "Swan Lake"
- Prince Desire, Pyotr Tchaikovsky's "Sleeping Beauty"
- Spartacus, in "Spartacus"
- Eternal Idol, Edgar Hovhannisyan's "Eternal Idol"
- Komitas in "Antuni" [The homeless one - about Komitas]
