= Alexander Spendiaryan =

Russian composer of Armenian descent

Alexander Spendiarov
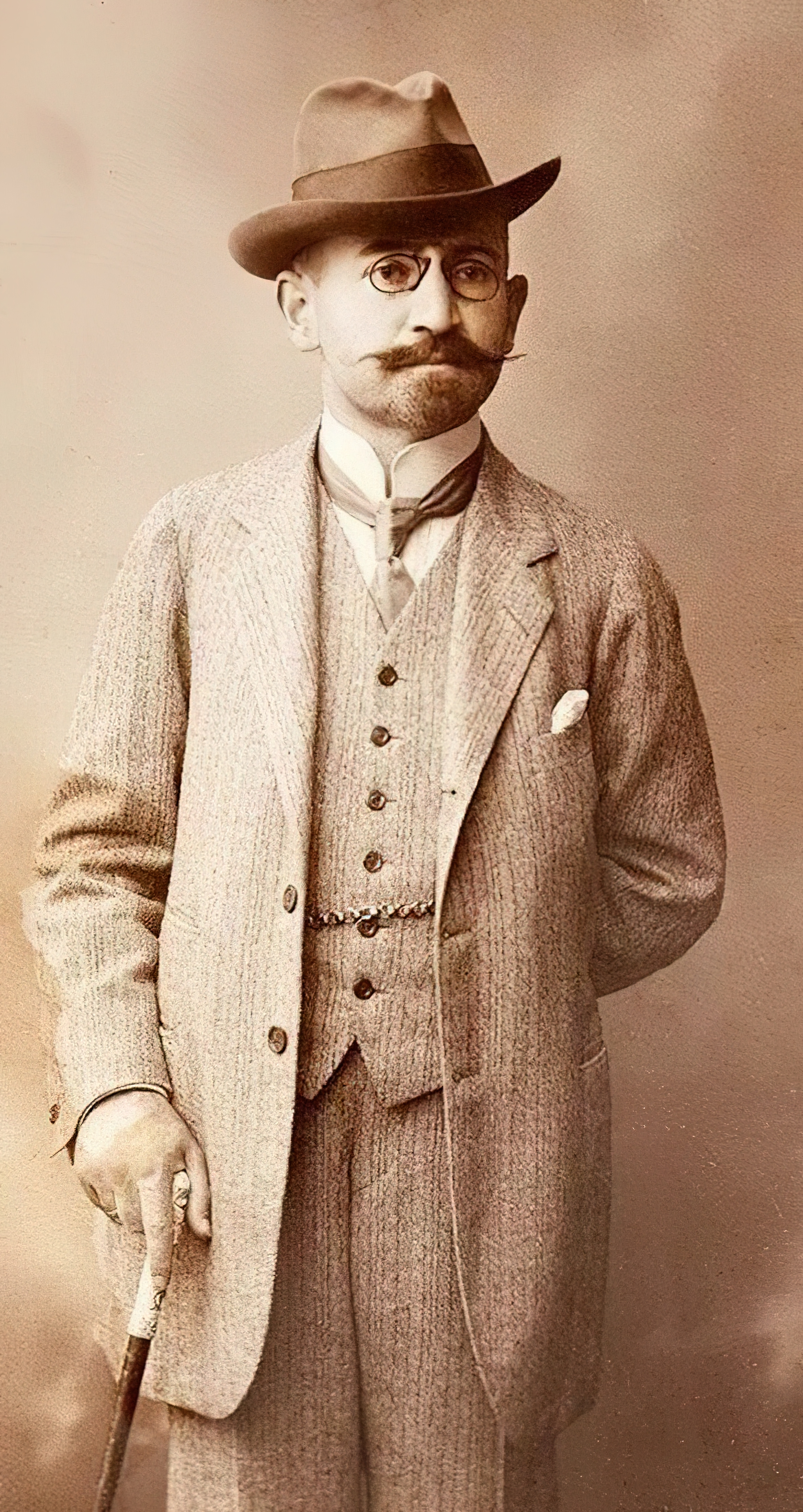
- Born: 1 November 1871; Kakhovka, Taurida Governorate, Russian Empire
- Died: 7 May 1928 (aged 56); Yerevan, Transcaucasian SFSR, Soviet Union
- Works: Yerevan etudes, Almast

Alexander Afanasyevich Spendiarov (Armenian: Ալեքսանդր Ստեփանոսի Սպենդիարյան, romanized: Alek’sandr Step’anosi Spendiaryan, 1 November 1871, Kakhovka, Russian Empire – 7 May 1928, Yerevan, Armenia) was a Russian composer and conductor of Armenian descent. He is considered the founder of Armenian national symphonic music.

== Biography ==
Alexander Spendiarov was born on 1 November [O.S. 20 October] 1871 in Kakhovka, province of Tavrik (modern Ukraine). His artistic abilities were formed in early childhood. He inherited his musical abilities from his mother who played piano. When Alexander Spendiarov was seven he wrote a waltz. In 1890 he went to Moscow and studied for one year in the Natural Sciences faculty of Moscow University, and then in 1894 he graduated from the Law faculty. At the same time he continued his violin classes. In 1896 Alexander Spendiarov went to St. Petersburg to show his compositions to Nikolai Rimsky-Korsakov, who greatly admired his music and encouraged him to turn deeper into his people's folklore. From 1896 to 1900 he took private composition lessons with Rimsky-Korsakov. According to Alexander Glazunov, "Rimsky-Korsakov was perfectly satisfied with the results of Alexander Spendiarov's work and considered him a serious, talented composer with a great flair for composition".

Spendiarov was awarded the Glinka prize three times for his three works: the symphonic picture "Three Palms" in 1908, the legend "Preacher Beda" in 1910 and the melody declamation "We’ll Have a Rest" in 1912. His symphonic pieces, songs and romances, choral works, and musico-declamatory pieces earned him high marks among audiences and professional musicians. Spendiarov led concerts in Kharkov, Odessa, Moscow, Petersburg, Doni-Rostov and New Nakhijevan. He spent much of his time in Yalta and Sudak. While he was living in Crimea, Spendiarov met Anton Chekhov, Maxim Gorky and Fyodor Shalyapin. Alexander Glazunov was also a guest at his house.

In 1910 Spendiarov became a member of Yalta's Russian Musical Company.

The symphonic poem "Three Palms" occupies a special place among Spendiarov's symphonic compositions. With its poetic tone, picturesque nature, and bright coloring, it resembles the oriental program works of the Mighty Handful. Spendiaryan toured abroad performing this piece in Berlin, Copenhagen, New York, and elsewhere.

Other works by Spendiarov include "Concert Prelude", "Concert Waltz", and "Etude of Jewish Themes", Cantabile and Prelude for string quartet, Baracarolle, Minuet, Scherzo, romances and vocal instrumental works. "Oh Rose" (Aye Vart) was a very famous classical piece in Russia and the former USSR.

In 1916 Spendiarov performed in Tiflis, where he met poet Hovhannes Tumanian and decided to write an opera based on "The Capture of Tmkabert" poem. In 1916 the libretto of Almast opera was ready, and Spendiarov began work on the opera, and finished the opera's vocal score in 1923. He continued his work on the instrumentation right up to his death. The instrumentation of the fourth act of "Almast" was completed by composer Maximilian Steinberg.

On 10 December 1924 Spendiarov, newly arrived in Yerevan from Russia, conducted an 18-member orchestra consisting of conservatory professors and students. This inaugural concert proved that Armenia had the potential to sustain a symphony orchestra. The following year, on 20 March 1925, Professor Arshak Adamian, Rector of the Yerevan Conservatory, led the first concert of the then newly founded symphony orchestra. At the time, Spendiarov accurately predicted, "There will come a time, when our yet modest student orchestra will proudly bear the honorary title of the Armenian State Orchestra."

The "Yerevan Sketches (Etudes)" (1925) comprise some of the best work of Spendiarov's last years. The sketches are proceeded by numerous notations of folk themes, and experiments in their arrangement and harmonization. In the sketches, Spendiarov introduced the dhol and the dayira, two Armenian musical instruments.

In 1926 the Soviet Armenian government awarded Spendiarov the title of People's Artist on the occasion of the 25th anniversary of his achievements in musical and public life.

Spendiarov died after a short illness in Yerevan in 1928. He is buried in the yard of Yerevan State Opera and ballet Theatre. A death mask of his face and right hand is exhibited in his House Museum. "What he gave us is immortal", said poet Avetik Isahakyan about Spendiarov.

Composer Aram Khatchaturian said of his predecessor, "I am profoundly convinced that Spendiarov and Komitas are the patriarchs of Armenian classical music; they have charted the principal trends in the evolution of Armenian musical art for many decades to come." Spendiarov and Aram Khatchaturian met for the first time in Moscow. Spendiarov appreciated the potential in the young composer.

== Personal life ==
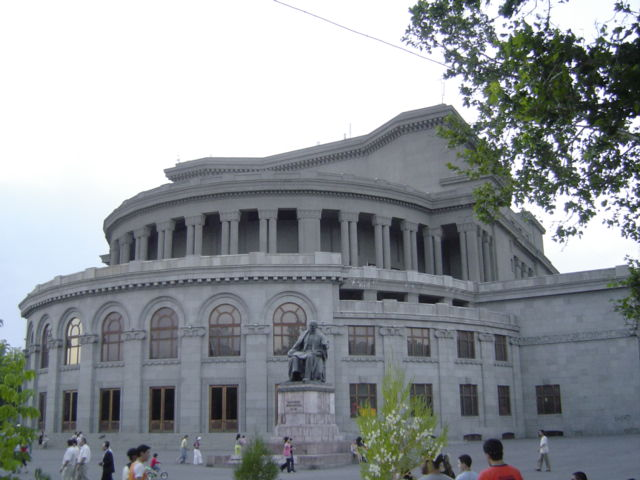
Yerevan's Opera Theater, named after Alexander Spendiarov.

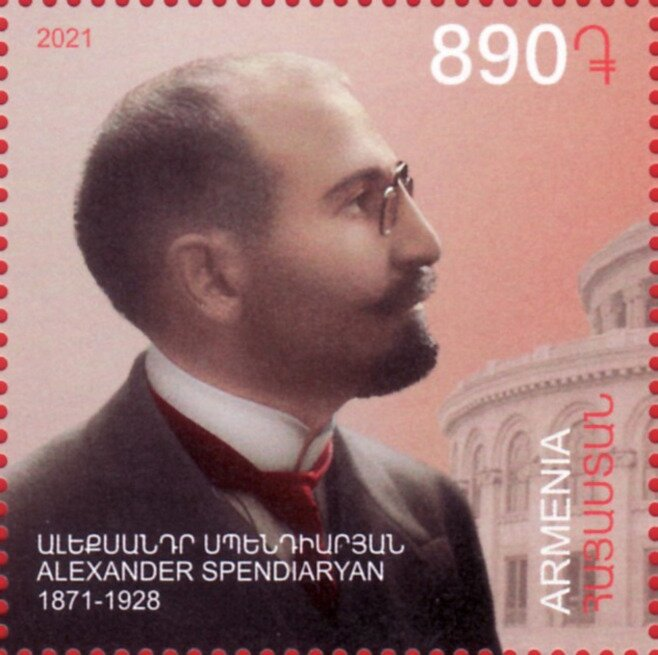
Spendiaryan on a 2021 stamp of Armenia

Spendiarov had a brother, Leonid, an accomplished geologist, and three sisters. When Leonid died, Spendiarov married the widow to prevent his brother's son from growing up fatherless. Her name was Varvara Mazirova; she was a relative to Hovhannes Aivazovsky. They had 6 children - 4 daughters and 2 sons.

== Museum ==
In 1967, the Alexander Spendiarov House Museum was established in the house where the composer lived during the last years of his life (the second floor apartment at 21 Nalbandyan Street, Yerevan). The Soviet Armenian government had given him a room in the communal apartment in 1926. Spendiarov used to enjoy the view of Mount Ararat from the small balcony. The museum has recreated the genuine atmosphere of the composer's study and presents the composer's personal belongings, numerous documents and other belongings. Spendiarov's portrait by Martiros Saryan painted in 1967, a poster announcing the opera, `Almast,' as the first performance to open the Opera building in Yerevan (1933), two of his violins and a piano are displayed in the apartment.

== Works ==
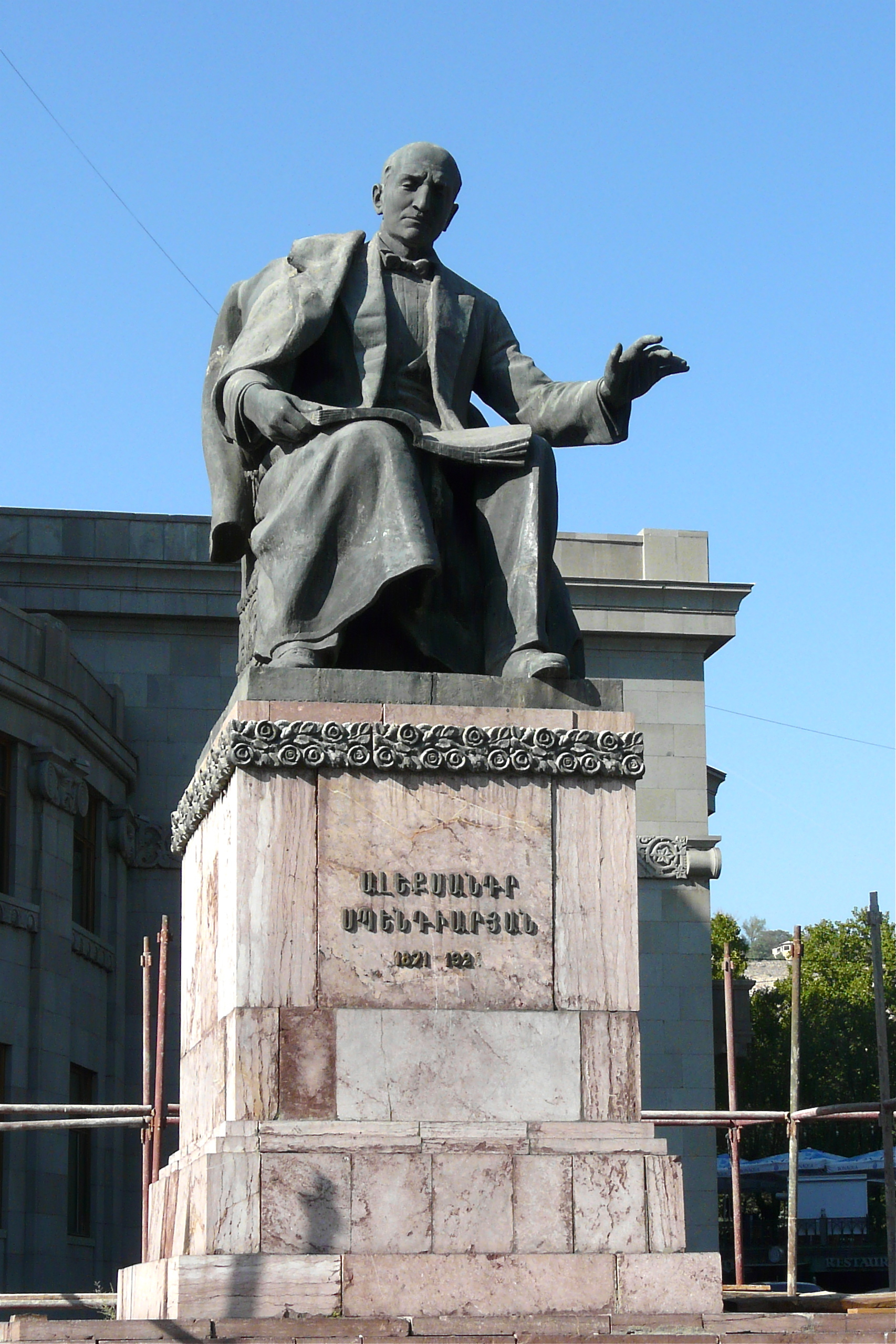
Statue of Spendiarov near the Yerevan Opera Theatre

=== Romances and songs ===
- Your Black Eyes Fascinated Me (P. Kozlov), 1888–1889
- No Question For Many A Day (V. Soloviov), 1892
- You Are the Bright Sun – The Sun of My Soul (anon.), serenade, 1892
- Song of the Drowned Woman (A. Podolinsky), 1895
- I Don't Know Why (L. May), 1895
- The Same Night (A. Borovikovsky), 1895
- Oh, Rose of My Youth (anon.), date unknown
- And Profound is Their Love (Lermontov, Heine), opus 1, No 1, 1895
- I Have Dreamed of your Love (Natson), opus 1, No. 2, 1898
- Ah, Rose (A. Tsaturian), opus 1, No. 3, 1894

=== Opera ===
- "Almast". Libretto by Sophia Parnok based on Hovhannes Tumanyan's "The Siege of Tmka Castle" poem. 1918–1928. Transl. into Armenian by P. Mikayelian

=== Symphonic ===
- "Minuet", opus 3, No 1, 1895
- "Lullaby", opus 3, No 2, 1897
- "Ancient Dance", opus 12, 1896
- "Concert Prelude", opus 4, 1900
- "Crimean Sketches". First series, opus 9, 1903
- "Three Palms", Symphonic poem, opus 10, 1905
- Prelude to the "Three Palms".

=== Other ===
- Waltz, 1892–1893;
- Menuet, 1895;
- Crimean esquizes, 1903, 1912;
- The Diviner, for piano four hands, Ed. and annotated by Haig Avakian, Cairo, Dream Press, 2000.
- Deux Berceuses for piano (Op. 3)

== See also ==
- Dikran Tchouhadjian
- Vanoush Khanamirian
