= Anoush =

1912/1935 opera by Armen Tigranian

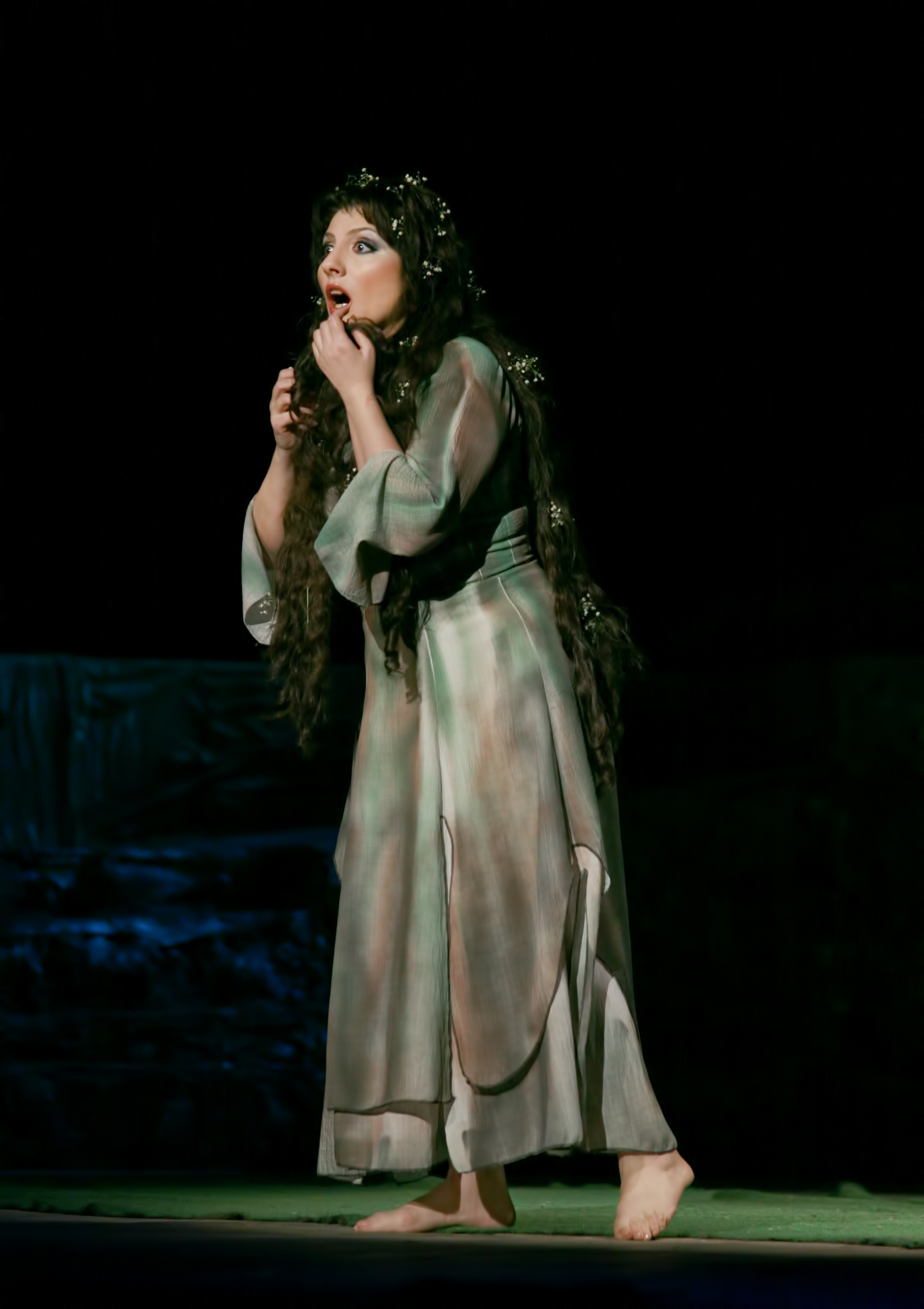
Anahit Mekhitarian as Anoush

Original poster for Anoush (1912)

Anoush (also Anush, Armenian: Անուշ) is an opera in five acts with music by composer Armen Tigranian. It uses an Armenian language libretto by Tigranian based on the 1892 poem of the same name by Hovhannes Tumanyan. The opera is about the tragedy of a peasant girl (Anoush) whose short love affair ends in loss and death because of conflict between her lover (Saro) and her brother (Mossy).

== History ==
Tigranian began composing Anoush in 1908. The opera was given its premiere in an amateur production at People’s City Hall in Alexandropol for performances on 4 and 17 August 1912. The music of the opera was based heavily on Armenian folk music, and the work is acknowledged as the first opera to be completely inspired by that music heritage. It was performed widely by amateur community theatre and music groups after it premiered.

Anoush is credited with establishing a national style for Armenian opera; although Tigranian's opera was influenced by the earlier Armenian opera Arshak II (1868) by Tigran Chukhajian. In 1935 the opera was given its first professional staging at the Armenian National Opera Theater in Yerevan in a revised version with new orchestrations. This production later toured to the Bolshoi Theatre in Moscow in 1939. It remains in the standard repertoire in Armenia. The opera was given what was billed as its first staging in the West at the Michigan Opera Theatre in 1981.

== Plot ==
The tragic love story is set in a typical 19th-century Armenian village. Anoush is a young village girl who falls in love with a shepherd, named Saro. One evening, at a village wedding celebration, Mossy, Anoush's brother, and Saro wrestle in a friendly match. Anoush watched from the sidelines. However, instead of ending it in a draw, as is the prevailing custom, Saro violates the local code of honor and humiliates him by pinning him down. Enraged, Mossy vows to destroy Saro, whom he now considers his enemy. Efforts for reconciliation between the two failing, and finding their hopes of marriage dashed, Anoush and Saro run away. Eventually, while Anoush is back in the village in an attempt for reconciliation, Mossy finds Saro and shoots him dead. Upon this loss, Anoush loses her sanity and ends her life by throwing herself off a cliff.

== Recordings ==
- Anoush: Kohar Kasparian (Anoush soprano), Dikran Levonian (Saro tenor), Arshavir Garabedian (Mosi baritone). Armenian National Opera Theatre, choir conductor Roupen Aivazian, orchestra conductor Hagop Vosganian, two-CD, 1998.
- Mosi's Aria: On Arias of Love & Sorrow: Gevorg Hakobyan (baritone), Kaunas Symphony Orchestra, John Fisher, Constantine Orbelian, 2023

== See also ==
- Armenian opera
