= Armen Tigranian =

Armenian composer, conductor and sociocultural activist

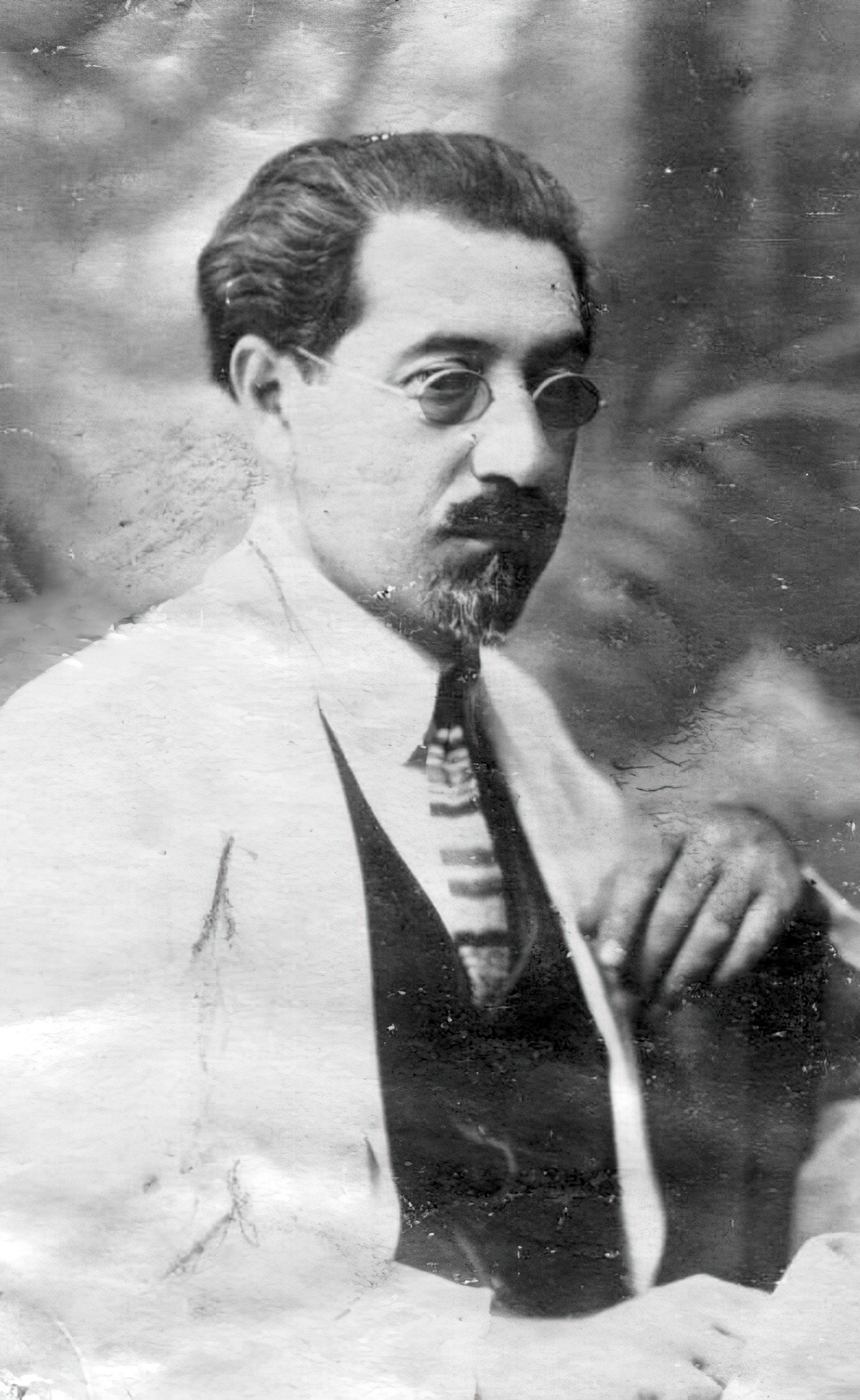
- Born: December 26, 1879; Alexandropol
- Died: February 10, 1950 (aged 70); Tbilisi
- Occupations: composer, conductor
- Years active: 1890s–1950

Armen Tigranian or Tigranyan or Dikranian (Armenian: Արմեն Տիգրանի Տիգրանյան; 26 December 1879, Alexandropol – 10 February 1950, Tbilisi) was an Armenian composer, conductor and sociocultural activist. His best-known work is Anoush, premiered in Alexandropol in 1912. It is the first opera ever performed in Armenia.

== Early years ==
Tigranian was born in Alexandropol in the Russian Empire (present-day Gyumri, Armenia). Composer Vardan Tigranyan (1906–1974) and architect Edmond Tigranyan were his sons.

He became interested in music at a very early age. In 1894, he moved to Tiflis (now Tbilisi) with his family, enrolled in the local music school where he mastered the flute, studied the piano and took classes in music theory under Nikolay Klenovsky. During the same period he studied composition with Makar Yekmalyan. Tigranian returned to Alexandropol in 1902 and devoted himself to teaching and composing music. He organized an amateur mixed choir and gave his first performance in 20 October 1902. He toured Tiflis, Kars, Yerevan, and Baku, disseminating Armenian music.

During this period he composed his first compositions, including «Սև աչերեն» (Of the Black Eyes, text by Avetik Isahakyan, «Մնաք բարով» (Good Bye, text by Hovhannes Hovhannisyan) and choral arrangements of folk material.

== Music ==
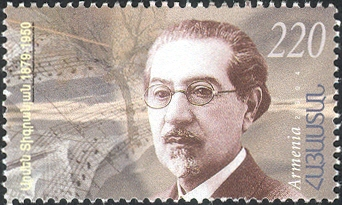
Tigranyan on a 2005 Armenian stamp

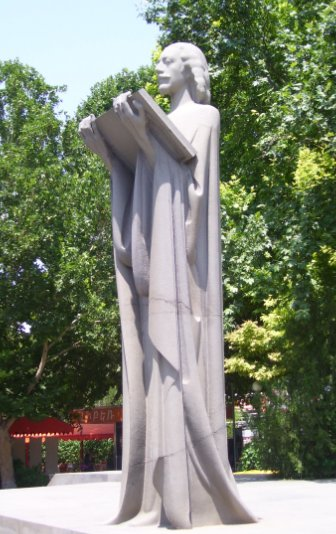
Tigranian statue in Yerevan, Armenia

During the years 1908 and 1912 he composed his masterpiece «Անուշ» (Anoush), generally considered the "national opera of the Armenian people". Anoush, based on Hovhannes Tumanian's story of romance and tragedy, is a social drama distinguished by the originality of its national style, its folk characters, and its musical language. It captured the attention of audiences and became an enduring favorite of the opera repertoire. The opera was premiered by an amateur group in Alexandropol on 4 August 1912.

The next year, Tigranian moved once more back to Tiflis where he became an active member of the Armenian Music Society, he taught, and toured, performing his own compositions.

Following the establishment of the Soviet regime, Tigranian thoroughly reviewed and edited the opera Anoush in order to adhere to the principles of the new populist aesthetics. The new edition was performed for the first time in Yerevan on 27 March 1935, and then in Moscow during the ten-day Festival of Armenian Arts on 22 October 1939. For this occasion the score was re-orchestrated by Anoushavan Ter-Ghevondyan. The American premiere of Anoush took place on 27 May 1923 at the Lexington Avenue Opera House in New York in a presentation marketed toward the Armenian immigrant audience. The official American premiere of Anoush took place on 31 October 1981 at Michigan Opera Theatre.

Tigranian's second opera «Դավիթ Բեկ» (David Bek (opera)) was inspired by the history of Karabakh Melikdoms. It is based on a novel by Raffi (pen name for Hakob Melik Hakobian) and was composed during 1941 and 1950. Its melodic contour is mostly derived from Armenian folk songs; its music is accessible. The instrumentation was realized by Levon Khoja-Eynatyan and was staged in 1950 in Yerevan shortly after the composer's death.

Among the other works by Tigranian are the drama Leily and Mejnun, Eastern Dance for symphonic orchestra, songs, choral works and piano pieces. A collection of his articles, letters, and memoire was published in 1981 in Yerevan. He has translated into Armenian the libretti of Verdi's Rigoletto and Bizet's Carmen.

Tigranian died in Tbilisi. There are schools named after him and streets designated in Yerevan and in Gyumri.

== Awards ==
- Honoured Art Worker of Armenian SSR, 1935
- Honoured Art Worker of Georgian SSR, 1936
- Order of Lenin, 1939

== Listening ==
- Armen Tigranian – Anoush, film-opera
- Armen Tigranian – David Bek
