= Almast =

Opera by Alexander Spendiaryan

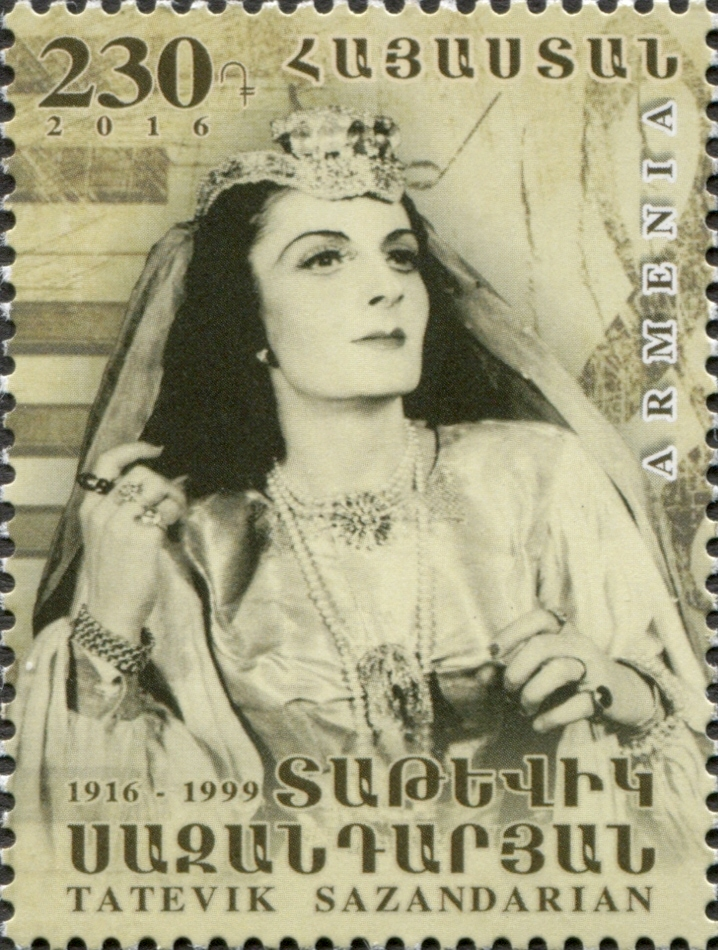
In 2016 a stamp was issued on the centenary of the birth of the opera singer Tatevik Sazandaryan. She was shown in the role of Almast.

Almast (Armenian: Ալմաստ meaning diamond) is the only opera of the Armenian composer Alexander Spendiaryan.

== History ==
In 1916 Spendiaryan met Armenian poet Hovhannes Tumanian, who suggested three of his poems "Anush", "Parvana" and "The Siege of the Tmbouk Castle" as themes for a national Armenian opera. Spendiaryan listened to the prelude of the last poem and was immediately attracted by its beauty. According to Tumanian's daughter, he was fascinated by Firdousi's poem in the banquet scene, by Tatoul's nightmare, and by the ambitious Almast - who dreamed of winning the throne. Tumanian also organized special musical evenings for Spendiarian in his own home and then at Tbilisi's Music School, in which national musicians and minstrels took part. At this stage Spendiarian, a Russian-Armenian, began to make a detailed study of Armenian folk music. He wrote: "Amongst the large amount of material I was particularly struck by Nikoghayos Tigranyan's music, on which I composed some of the instrumental passages in my opera". Because of the pressure of work, Tumanian was forced to abandon the idea of writing the libretto himself, and the task was undertaken by Russian poet Sophia Parnok. In 1916 the libretto was ready, and Spendiaryan began work on the opera, and finished the opera's vocal score in 1923. He continued his work on the instrumentation right up to his death. The instrumentation of the fourth act of "Almast" was completed by composer Maximilian Steinberg.

According to musical critic A. Shahverdian, "it is here that the basis was laid for a new style of Armenian national music."

== Performances ==
The first performance of "Almast" took place in 1930 at the Bolshoi Theatre, Moscow. On 20 January 1933, when the Yerevan State Academic Theatre of Opera and Ballet was opened, a performance of the opera was given in Armenian in Tigran Hakhumyan's translation. It was performed also in Tbilisi, Tashkent, Novosibirsk and Odessa. It was re-staged in Yerevan also in 1939, 1969, 1971 and 1983. In 1951 The Russian Chamber Opera Theatre in Paris gave a performance of "Almast" in the Mutualité Hall.

== See also ==
- Dikran Tchouhadjian

== Sources ==
- A. Shahverdian, A.A. Spendiaryan, Yerevan, "Hayastan" PH, Yerevan, 1971
- Concise Armenian Encyclopedia, Ed. by. acad. K. Khudaverdyan, Book 1, Yerevan, 1990, p. 94
