= David Satian =

Armenian composer, jazz pianist, media producer and entrepreneur

David Satian (also Satyan) (Armenian: Դավիթ Սաթյան; born August 17, 1979, in Yerevan) is an Armenian contemporary composer, jazz pianist, media producer and entrepreneur.

== Biography ==
He was born on 17 August 1979 in Yerevan capital of Armenia, into a family of renowned family of musicians, mostly composers. In this musical dynasty he represents the 3rd generation and with his work he was able to contribute further to a century long-existing musicals traditions of his family, although he is also active in entrepreneurship mainly in Media, IT and Finance sectors. His father Aram Satian is a known classical composer and popular music songwriter, for many years he was the Head of Music Programs at the Public Television Company of Armenia and currently is a Chairman of the Composers Union of Armenia. Grandfather is Aram Satunts (1913–1990) who was a People's Artist of Armenia, member of the Union of Soviet Composers and awarded with the Silver Medal of Alexandrov. Another notable composer in his family is Ashot Satian (1906–1956), the chairman of the Composers Union of Armenia from 1947 to 1952, Laureate of the State Stalin Prize in 1952 (also see: USSR State Prize / in Russian: Государственная Сталинская премия) who is known for his songs and also for composing the first Armenian String Quartet in 1936. As a film composer he received numerous awards for contribution to a Soviet Film Industry, including in 1951 Karlovy Vary International Film Festival (Czechoslovakia).

== Awards ==
- 2009 – Quarter Finalist of the Queen Elisabeth Competition (Belgium) | Category: Composition | «In Memoriam» for Violin and Symphony Orchestra (Dedicated to the memory of the Armenian Genocide victims)
- 2008 - 2nd Prize - Bösendorfer Jazz Solo Piano International Competition at Montreux Jazz Festival (Switzerland)
- 2003 - 1st Prize among pianists - ‘‘Leiden Jazz Award” International Competition for Jazz Soloist Performers (the Netherlands)
- 1998 - Special Prize of Composers Union of Armenia
- 1996 - 1st Prize and Gold medal - "Amadeus" Young Composers Competition
- From 1987 - Various National Competitions and Festivals

== Professional Education ==
- 2009 - Master's degree | Distinction (King's College London / London, United Kingdom)
- 2004 - Master's degree | Distinction (University of Maastricht / Maastricht, the Netherlands)
- 2002 - Master's degree | Distinction (Yerevan State Conservatory / Yerevan, Armenia)
- 2001 - Bachelor's degree | Distinction (Yerevan State Conservatory / Yerevan, Armenia)
- 1996 - College Degree in Music (Spendiarian Music College / Yerevan, Armenia)
- 1993 - Certificate of Complete Secondary Education in Music (Sayat Nova Music School / Yerevan Armenia)

== Research and Scholarly Activity ==
The research is dedicated to the problems concerning the relationships between the folk, jazz and classical genres. The main intention is to create a synthesis of contemporary classical music and advanced avant-garde jazz in which the preoccupations, idioms, and performing styles of both traditions would feed into each other, resulting in compositions, which would belong equally to the jazz and the classical music world. While there have been many attempts at such a fusion over the last hundred years (most notably by George Gershwin, Milton Babbitt, Gunther Schuller, Louis Andriessen, and Mark-Anthony Turnage), it is only now that the development of both traditions has reached a point in which the state of their language share a wealth of common concerns and expressive features, rendering such a synthesis possible. This research will result in a portfolio of musical compositions and a technical commentary making explicit the aesthetic considerations and technical devices embodied in the compositions and their relationship to previous attempts at cross-fertilization of these genres.

== Notable Music Works ==
- 2010 - “3 Moments” Concerto for Orchestra
- 2009 - Trio for Alto Saxophone, Piano and Contrabass
- 2009 - “Duplex” for clarinet, violin, cello and piano
- 2008 - “Tango a la Modern” for Piano Quartet
- 2008 - “In Memoriam” for Violin and Symphony Orchestra
- 2007 -“Pass” for Brass Ensemble (2 parts)

== Satian Musical Dynasty ==
- Ashot Satian 1906–1958
- Aram Satunc (Satian) 1913–1990
- Aram Satian 1947–
- Ashot Satian Jr. 1965–
- Arthur Satian 1973–
- David Satian 1979–
- Lilit Satian 1981–
- Ruben Satian 1982–

== Sources ==
- BBC Radio Ulster Programmes
- Montreux Jazz Festival History, Bösendorfer Montreux Jazz Solo Piano Competition 2008
