= Evgeny Khavtan =

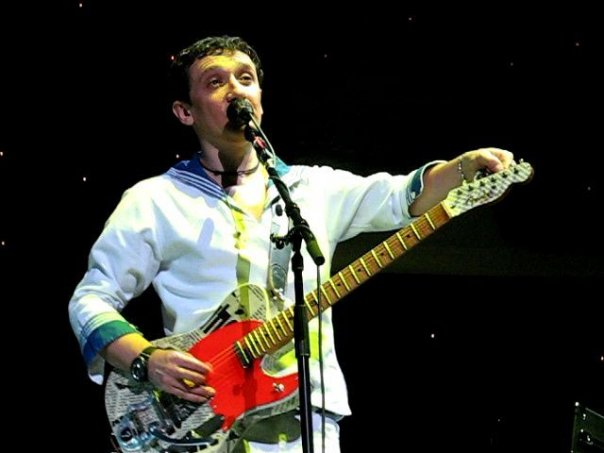

Background information
- Born: 16 October 1961 (age 64); Moscow, USSR
- Genres: rock n roll; surf rock; new wave; ska; reggae; jazz; indie rock; Latin music
- Occupations: Musician; singer; songwriter; producer
- Instruments: Vocals, guitar, keyboards, bass guitar
- Years active: 1980–present
- Labels: Melodiya, General Records, Moroz Records, Soyuz Music, Polarvox
- Member of: Bravo, Los Havtanos
- Website: havtan.com

Evgeny Lvovich Khavtan (Russian: Евге́ний Льво́вич Хавта́н, born 16 October 1961, Moscow) is a Soviet and Russian musician, guitarist, singer, and songwriter. He is best known as the founder of the Russian rock band Bravo, which was formed in 1983, and Los Havtanos project, which was formed in 2018. Khavtan has released 18 studio albums with his bands.

The record label ‘Melodiya’ sold 5 million copies of the band's debut album released in 1986. In 1999, seven Bravo songs were ranked on the list of "100 Best Russian Rock Songs of the 20th Century" according to listeners vote of the rock radio station in Russia, Nashe Radio. In 2011, their album "Fashion" (Russian: "Мода") was named as "Album of the Year" by NASHE radio. Bravo's musical career began 40 years ago in the USSR, and the band still tours and releases albums.

== Early years ==
Evgeny Khavtan, the son of an engineer and an English and German teacher, was born in Moscow on 16 October 1961. His mother was interned with her family in the Sharhorod ghetto in Transnistria during World War II and in 2004 wrote a book 'Memoir' about her experience. Khavtan spent his childhood and youth in the Moscow district of Kuzminki, to which he later dedicated the song "From Taganka to Kuzminki" (‘Fashion’ album). Influenced by general trends of the time, he started playing guitar at a young age and graduated from a classical six-string guitar class at music school. As a fan of different genres, from the ‘new wave of British rock’ to 1950s classic American rock and roll, he started dressing up like a Teddy Boy in the early 1980s. After graduating high school, he started studying at the Moscow State University of Railway Engineering.

== Musical career ==
In his early days he played and sang in various amateur rock bands before he managed to form his own. He gained popularity and recognition through his work with Bravo that connected with audiences in the USSR and beyond.

=== Bravo ===
In 1983 Khavtan and "Postscriptum" drummer Pavel Kuzin founded their own band. They played a mix of new wave and 50s–60s rock. Khavtan and Kuzin, without a band name, were joined by saxophonist Alexander Stepanenko, bassist Andrey Konusov, and singer Ivonna Anders (real name Zhanna Aguzarova). After one of their earliest performances, which was held at the "Krylatskoe" disco venue in December 1983, the band decided to keep the name Bravo. The new band had no official registration, so they performed illegally. On 18 March 1984, after a performance in a Moscow suburb, the band members were detained for "illegal entrepreneurial activity" (since all ticket proceeds were not declared). A criminal case was initiated against the musicians, and Khavtan was expelled from the university. During the investigation, it came out that Zhanna's passport was counterfeit, and after imprisonment in ‘Matrosskaya Tishina’, Zhanna was expelled from Moscow to Siberia. A few years later, the criminal case was closed for "lack of evidence", and the band joined Moscow Rock Laboratory (twin brother of Leningrad Rock Club), but they didn't stay with it for long. After being awarded as the "Best New Artist" at the Rock Panorama-86 festival, they were invited to work officially at the Moscow Regional Philharmonic. Khavtan was reinstated at the University and finally graduated in 1987. The day after receiving his higher education diploma he went on tour with Bravo.

In 1986 the record label ‘Melodiya’ released the first official Bravo album in the USSR – a vinyl record ‘Ensemble Bravo’. The songs were recorded by Alexander Kutikov in Mashina Vremeni band's studio. The album included re-recorded songs from the first two tape albums. In 1987 the Finnish recording label Polarvox re-released the band's debut album for the Finnish market. A tour in Finland and performances at summer rock festivals in Sweden, Denmark, and Italy followed. At the Smukfest festival (Denmark), Bravo opened for Duran Duran. By the late 1980s, the relationship between the musicians and Zhanna Aguzarova became strained, and the singer left the band. Anna Salmina briefly replaced her, followed by Tatyana Ruzaeva. Aguzarova eventually returned to the group but permanently departed at the end of 1988 to focus on her solo career. In 1989, Evgeny Osin joined Bravo as the lead singer and took part in the "Let's Say 'Bravo!' to Each Other" album. After a tour around the Baltics, Osin left the band.

In the beginning of 1990, a new singer Irina Epifanova joined Bravo and recorded two singles with the band. Later that year, musician, singer, and songwriter Valery Syutkin joined the group. Together, Syutkin and the band, released three albums and toured, until Syutkin left Bravo to pursue a solo career in 1995.

Evgeny Khavtan has found a new vocalist, Robert Lenz, whose identity was kept secret until the recording of the album ‘At the Crossroads of Spring’ was finished in 1996. Lenz continues to work with the band until today.

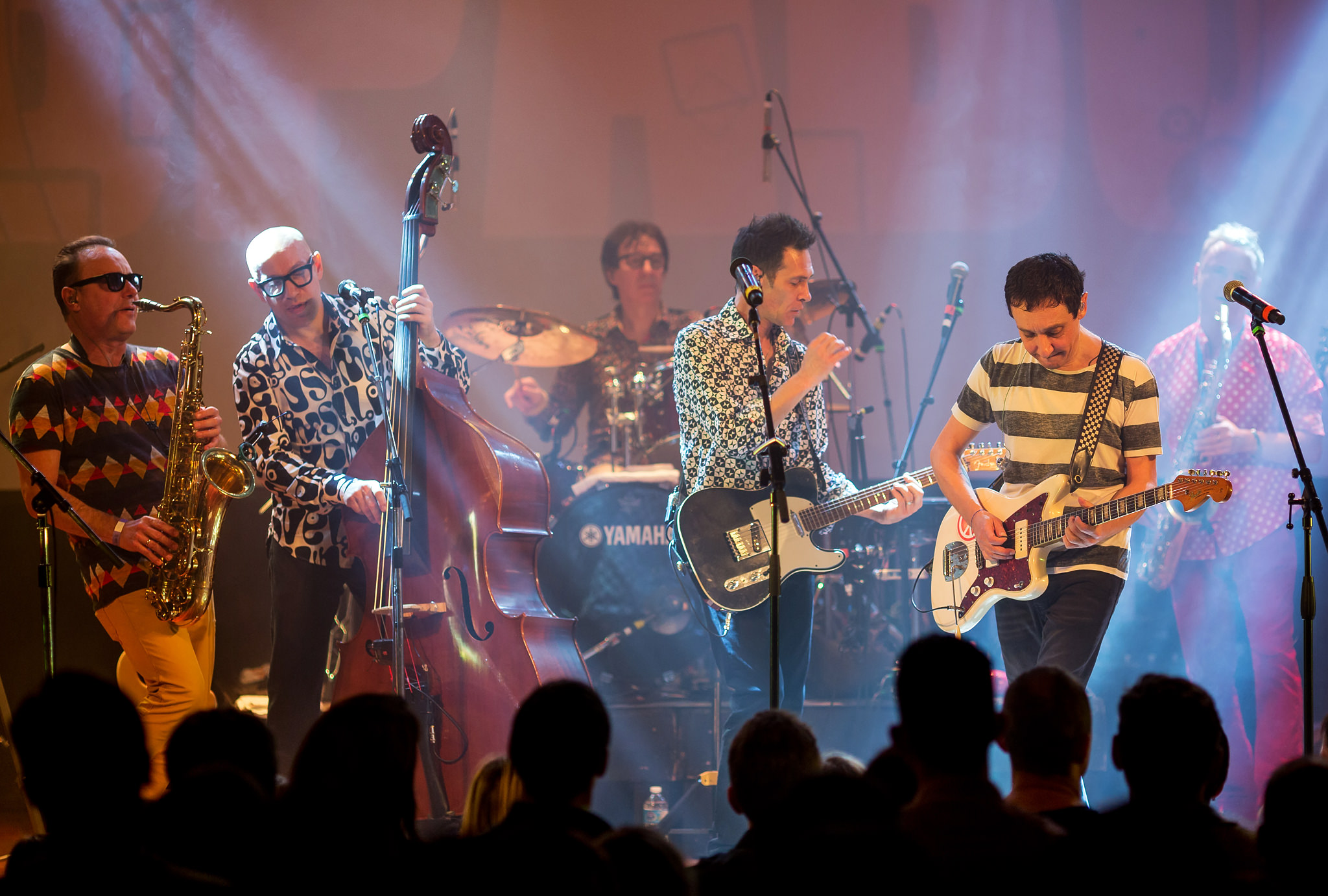
Bravo concert in The Opera House, Toronto in 2016

Throughout its history, Bravo experienced numerous lineup changes, with Khavtan being the only constant member and composer (and occasionally songwriter) for most songs. Later Khavtan began to sing some of the songs himself, sharing duties with Robert Lenz.

In 2011, Khavtan met Grammy-nominated American producer Ghian Wright and their collaboration resulted in the album ‘Fashion’, which was voted "Album of the Year" by NASHE radio listeners. Ghian Wright has produced all of Khavtan's subsequent recordings.

In 2017, journalist Alexey Pevchev released the book ‘Bravo. Authorized Biography of the Band’. Music critic Artemy Troitsky praised the book, saying, "The 'Bravo' band is so vivid, romantic, and exciting that even with great effort, it would be impossible to write a dull book about it".

In 2018, Khavtan started a new music project, Los Havtanos.

=== Los Havtanos ===
In 2017 Evgeny Khavtan recorded the song "Ships" with musicians from the flamenco-gypsy-jazz band Barrio Manouche, based in San Francisco. The recording was subsequently sent to Los Angeles for mixing by Ghian Wright.

The Russian version of the album 'Come To Me' (Russian: "Иди ко мне") was released on 7 October 2020, by Souyz Music

"I've always liked music that has the warmth and sunshine of South America and is based on the fiery rhythms of rumba, salsa, and flamenco. It was something I really missed during my rock and roll era, which I had been doing for so long. So, I decided to try something completely new and record a Latino album", explains Evgeny Khavtan.

The record was produced across the globe: Moscow, Los Angeles (USA), Havana (Cuba), Porto Alegre (Brazil). Producer Ghian Wright handled the mixing, and one of the songs was produced by Latin Grammy-winning producer Leo Bracht (Brazil).

Los Havtanos song ‘Mar De Blanca Arena’ (the song which launched the band, known as ‘Ships' (Russian: "Корабли") in the Russian version was awarded as the 'Best Latin Song' at the Palm Beach International Music Awards’ (USA) in 2021.

== Musical style and influence ==
Khavtan is a big fan of 1960s music, fashion, and cinema. His guitar sound and style have been influenced by guitarists Chuck Berry, Dick Dale, Scotty Moore, George Harrison, Andy Summers, Hank Marvin, Johnny Marr, and bands such as The Beatles, The Kinks, The Police, The Smiths, Stray Cats, Madness, Heroes del Silencio. Khavtan has a passion for vinyl records and 1960s-style clothing. He collects vintage guitar amplifiers and guitars, with nearly 100 items in his collection. The musician prefers electric guitars and amplifiers produced before 1970, and his partners in crime on stage and in the studio are a Fender Deluxe Reverb and a white 1966 Fender Jazzmaster guitar.

In 2015 Fender made a signature model Fender E.Havtan Telecaster. This model differs from the standard Telecasters by the addition of a Bigsby tremolo system and a neck pickup that is located much closer to the neck. The instrument body is covered with old 1980s cut-outs of Bravo newspapers and photos. On his official website, Khavtan writes a blog about his guitar equipment and instruments and also provides a platform for people to ask questions about guitars.

== Personal life ==
Evgeny's wife is Marina Borisovna Khavtan (b. 13 October 1960), engineer-economist. They have a daughter, Polina Khavtan (b. 14 October 1993), who graduated from the Gerasimov Institute of Cinematography (Film Studies Faculty) and works as a film critic. After the Russian invasion of Ukraine began at the end of February 2022, he moved to Israel with his wife and daughter and got a house in the city of Rishon LeZion near Tel Aviv.

== Discography ==
Studio albums

- Cassette 1983 (1983)
- Cassette 1985 (1985)
- Bravo (1987)
- Ensemble Bravo (1987)
- Fops from Moscow (1990)
- Moscow Beat (1993)
- Road to the Clouds (1994)
- The Wind Knows...(single) (1995)
- At the Crossroads of Spring (1996)
- Serenade 2000 EP (1997)
- Hits about Love (1998)
- Eugenics (2001)
- Fashion (2011)
- Forever (2015)

Other studio albums

- VIE ‘Rare bird’ – Unreleased (1982)
- Postscript – Cheer up! (1982)
- Solo project Mickey Mouse and stilettos – EP Jazz in Orbit (2007)

Studio Albums with Los Havtanos

- Los Havtanos – Come to me! (2020)

Live albums

- Live in Moscow (1994)
- 30 Years. Concert in Stadium Live (2014)

Compilation albums

- Zhanna Aguzarova and Bravo (1993)
- Songs from Various Years (1995)
- The Star Catalog (tribute) (2004)
- Bravospective (2017)
