= AloeVera =

Russian musical group

- Origin: Yekaterinburg, Russia
- Genres: Indie rock, Pop rock, Jazz-rock, Krautrock
- Years active: 2011–present
- Members: Vera Musaelyan, Artyom Klimenko, Grigory Basov, Yury Pushkarev, Mikhail Endza, Stanislav Landyrev
- Past members: Alexander Volkhin, Vasily Skorodinsky, Sergey Karmanov, Anton Shokhirev, Vladislav Alipov
- Website: aloeband.ru

AloeVera is a Russian musical group from Yekaterinburg, performing music in the pop rock style. The group's name is a play on words; "Алоэ" (Aloe) is a plant name, while "Вера" (Vera) is a common Russian female name and also means "faith".

== History ==
AloeVera was founded in 2011 in Yekaterinburg and became a prominent representative of the Ural music scene. The only permanent member of the group is the vocalist and songwriter Vera Musaelyan. Over the years, the band's lineup has changed repeatedly, but by 2014, the group had found its current sound. Performing pop-rock, AloeVera released three successful albums and won the love of fans, combining high-quality musical experiments with energetic and lively performances.

== Band members ==
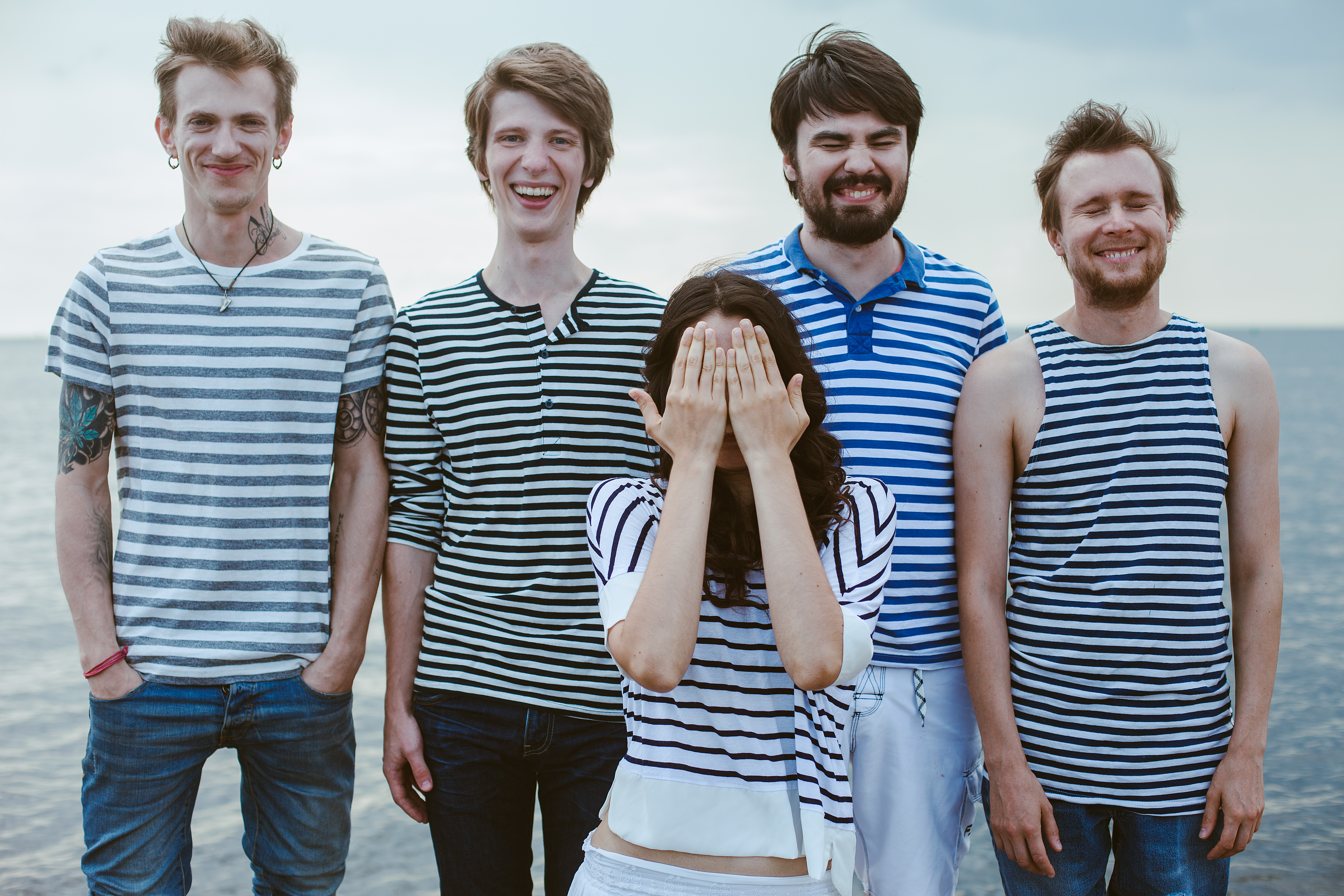
AloeVera in 2014

The band's lineup has been quite fluid, including current and former members:

- Vera Musaelyan – vocals, songwriter, creative activity (2011–present)
- Artyom Klimenko – bass guitar, guitar, acoustics, recording, mixing, arrangements (2012–present)
- Mikhail "Ninja" Endza – guitar, sound engineer
- Evgeny Pyankov – keyboards
- Stanislav Landyrev – trumpet (2015–present)
- Yury Pushkarev – drums (2014–present)
- Anton Shokhirev – drums (2012–2014)
- Vladislav Alipov – trumpet
- Rostislav Kundik – sound engineer
- Sergey Karmanov – saxophone (2011–2012, joined Sansara)
- Grigory Basov – guitar, sound engineer (2012–present)
- Alexander Volkhin – guitar (original lineup)
- Vasily Skorodinsky – bass guitar (original lineup)

== Discography ==
=== Studio albums ===
- 2011 – Kazhduyu moyu vesnu (Every Spring of Mine)
- 2012 – Styd (Shame)
- 2014 – Legche (Easier)
- 2016 – Kak bogi (Like Gods)
- 2018 – Alimono
- 2022 – Sdelayem vid (Let's Pretend)

=== EPs ===
- 2013 – Ya provyol leto (I Spent the Summer)
- 2016 – Derzhi menya v kurse (Keep Me Posted)

=== Singles ===
- 2015 – "Begi" (Run)
- 2016 – "Kapitan" (Captain)
- 2018 – "Lyotchiki" (Pilots)
- 2020 – "Platye v tochku" (Polka Dot Dress)
- 2020 – "Chtobytselovat'sya" (To Kiss)

Singles (as featured artist)

- 2017 – "Soldat" (Soldier) (feat. Prostyvshiy passazhir tramvaya № 7)
- 2020 – "Medoed" (Honey Badger) (feat. Dima Simonov; Abbalbisk remix)

=== Live albums ===
- 2017 – Dozhd' (Zhivoye vystupleniye) (Rain (Live Performance))
- 2017 – Layv 5 let (Live 5 Years)
- 2018 – Pro muzhey i kapitanov (About Husbands and Captains)
- 2020 – Chtobytselovat'sya (To Kiss)

=== Other appearances ===
- 2012 – Okhota 39 compilation ("Nesuraznaya") (Bomba-Piter label)
- 2012 – Re:Аквариум ("Marina")
- 2017 – My vyshli iz Kino. Tribyut Kino ("Syuzhet dlya novoy pesni")
- 2024 – Rossiyane – Pamyati Alekseya Navalnogo
- 2024 – Mirnye ogon'ki 2024
- 2025 – Mirnye ogon'ki 2025

== Media appearances ==
In June 2012, the band first appeared on the TV channel Russia-1 in the program "Profilaktika". During the broadcast, the group performed several new, unreleased tracks that differed significantly from what the group had previously performed. Following this, AloeVera was invited to Radio Mayak for the "Chayka" program with host Semyon Chayka, where the band gave an hour-long concert live. In July of the same year, AloeVera appeared in the program "Mgnoveniya" with Alex Dubas on the TV channel Dozhd. That same summer, AloeVera participated in the tribute project Re:Аквариум, dedicated to the anniversary of the band Aquarium.

The album "Styd" (Shame), with its bold, ironic songs, attracted media attention. Reviews of the album appeared in publications such as Kommersant and Moskovsky Komsomolets. The provocative cover of the album "Styd" was included in the top ten best covers of the year according to the editors of the magazine Russian Reporter.

In February 2013, the band appeared on the program Vecherniy Urgant on Channel One Russia as a musical guest. The song "Ne pomnyu – ne bylo" (I Don't Remember – It Wasn't There) gained widespread popularity. During the year after the release of the album "Styd", AloeVera appeared several times on Nashe Radio in the program "Zhivye", and the song "Kazhduyu moyu vesnu" from the album "Styd" began to be played on Nashe Radio. 2015 ended with a live concert in the studio of Vladimir Matetsky on radio station "MAYAK".

On February 26, 2016, AloeVera visited Radio "Komsomolskaya Pravda", where they played a live concert. In an interview between songs, Vera Musaelyan admitted that her journalism education gave her nothing, and in medical publications, she wrote columns in the style of "tested on myself."

In March 2017, the group appeared in Mikhail Kozyrev's program "LIVEнь" on the TV channel Dozhd.

In 2018, a track by the group was used in the TV series "Sled. Den'gi, kotoryye pakhnut" (Trace. Money That Smells).

== Festivals ==
In the summer of 2013, AloeVera performed in Moscow at the Rock on the Roof festival on the roof of the ArtPlay design center, at the Rock-Line festival in Perm, at the Wafest festival in Nizhny Novgorod, and at the Nashestvie festival. In 2014, the musicians visited Dobrofest, Nashestvie. In 2015 – the anniversary Wafest festival in Nizhny Novgorod, Indie Love in Izhevsk, Rock-Line in Perm, and also took part in the large-scale project Ural Music Night in Yekaterinburg. In 2016, they became one of the headliners of the "Old New Rock" festival, dedicated to the 30th anniversary of the Sverdlovsk Rock Club, Ural Music Night and Stereoleto in St. Petersburg. And in 2017, AloeVera performed at the Tambov rock festival Chernozem.

== Music videos ==
- In the summer of 2012, AloeVera released their debut music video for the single "Ne bylo" (It Wasn't There), which soon became an anthem for partygoers and Friday night parties. The video director is Yuliana Stich, known for her work with the bands Obe Dve ("Milyy", "Gonshchiki"), Bi-2 ("Lyubov' i nenavist'"), Fruktovy Kefir ("Pop-korn i oreshki"). A review of the video was published in the magazine Russian Reporter.
- In the spring of 2013, AloeVera released two more music videos for the songs "Nesuraznaya" (Awkward) (filming crew "Svet") and "Doktor" (Doctor) (directed by Yuliana Stich).
- In September 2013, a music video for the song "Glad'" (Smooth) was released. Director – Yuliana Stich.

== Singles and covers ==
- In 2012, AloeVera participated in the project Re:Аквариум. The cover version of the song "Marina" was among the top three songs performed by women.
- In 2014, AloeVera recorded the song "Robot" together with the band Brazzaville and Zemfira. The band's vocalist wrote the lyrics for the Russian-language verse and performed it.
- In 2015, in honor of Victory Day, AloeVera made a cover version of the song "General" by the band Kino. The video from the studio during the recording of the cover instantly spread on the Internet and received high praise from critics.
- In 2017, AloeVera took part in the project My vyshli iz Kino. Tribyut Kino, where they performed the song "Syuzhet dlya novoy pesni" (Plot for a New Song) by the band Kino from the album Nachalnik Kamchatki.
- In early 2020, two singles were released: "Platye v tochku" (Polka Dot Dress) – a song about the Moscow protests of the summer of 2019; and the song "Chtobytselovat'sya" (To Kiss), timed to coincide with a concert on Vera's birthday.
