= Dabro (group) =

Russian-Ukrainian musical duo

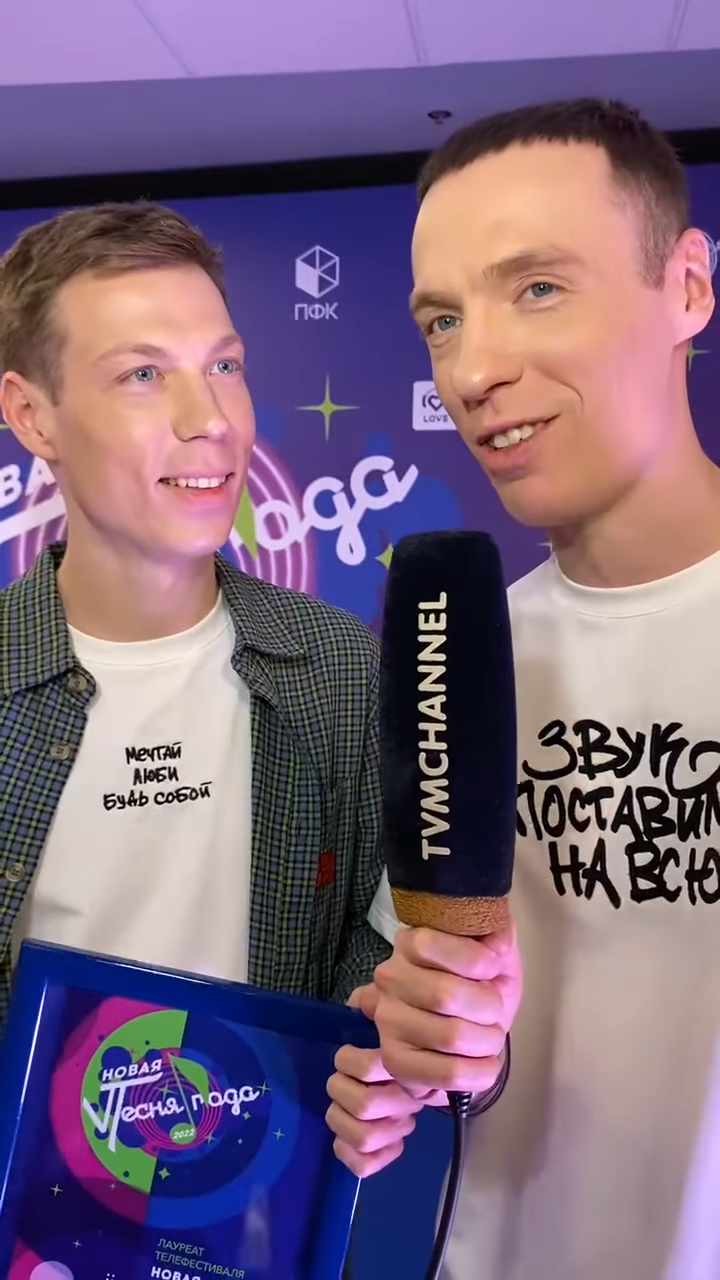
Dabro during an interview in February 2023

"Dabro" (pronounced in Russian as "Дабро́") is a musical group from Kazan (Republic of Tatarstan), consisting of two brothers Ivan & Mikhail Zasidkevichei. Ivan and Mikhail are the group's producers, as well as the authors for all of their songs. Their 2020 song "Юность" brought them much popularity.

== History ==
Brothers Ivan (born August 28, 1990) and Mikhail (born May 1, 1992) Zasidkevich were born and raised in the city of Kurakhovo in the Donetsk region in a musical family. Both studied at a music school, graduating in accordion.

In 2009, they started writing songs together in rap style.

In 2013, they founded the band Dabro, of which they are the only members. The brothers write their songs together and produce all their recordings themselves.

In 2015, the Azerbaijani singer Bahh Tee (real name Bakhtiyar), whom they met in Moscow, asked Mikhail and Ivan to write an album for him. They moved to Kazan for the duration of the collaboration. After the work was completed, the brothers decided to stay in this city, where they continue to live to this day.

The brothers also worked on songs by other artists: Svetlana Loboda, the group "Kasta", Decl, Rem Diggi, Dzhigan, Polina Gagarina and others.

In 2018, Dabro signed with Make It Music (Black Star's label) and in May released the song "I Like Her Eyes," which became a hit, allowing the band to begin touring. The band toured Germany, the Czech Republic, Lithuania, and Moldova.

In mid-May 2020, Dabro released the song "Youth", a video for it in June

While writing the song, we knew it was special. It's full of words and notes that give you goosebumps. This was already evident during the creation process. And when the idea for the video came about, when we began casting the characters, it was clear even during rehearsals that the clip would be lifelike and sincere. This work will definitely touch millions of viewers.

In mid-September 2020, the Dabro group was invited to the television show "Evening Urgant" (Channel One), where the brothers performed their hit "Youth".

The third mini-album "Youth" was released in November 2020. All songs from the album were performed in the Avtoradio studio.

== Discography ==
Professional ratings
Review scores
Source	Rating
InterMedia	5/10 stars

=== Albums ===
Name	Details
«Включай»	Release: 2013; Label: Make It Music; Format: digital distribution
«Наше время»	Release: 2014; Label: Make It Music; Format: digital distribution
«Дальше-больше»	Release: 2025; Label: Make It Music; Format: digital distribution

=== Collections ===
Title	Details
"Лучшие песни (The Best)"	Release: 19 June 2020; Label: Make It Music / Zhara Music; Format: Digital distribution

=== EPs ===
Title	Details
"Верность"	Release: 2013; Label: Make It Music; Format: Digital distribution
"Работа подождет"	Release: 24 June 2016; Label: Make It Music; Format: Digital distribution
"Юность"	Release: 6 November 2020; Label: Make It Music; Format: Digital distribution

== Awards and nominations ==
Year	Award	Category	Candidate/Work	Results	Ref.
2020	Nickelodeon Kids’ Choice Awards	Russian audience's favorite breakthrough of the year	Dabro	Won	
2021	«Golden Gramophone»	"Юность"	Dabro	Won	
2021	Top Hit Music Awards	Discovery of the year	Dabro	Won	
2021	Премия RU.TV	Best Start	Dabro	Nominated	
2021	Премия RU.TV	Dancefloor Stars	Dabro	Nominated	
2021	Премия RU.TV	Best song	Dabro	Nominated	
2021	Премия МУЗ-ТВ	Прорыв года	Dabro	Won	
2021	Премия МУЗ-ТВ	Best Group	Dabro	Nominated	
2021	Премия МУЗ-ТВ	Best song	«Юность»	Nominated	
2022	"Golden Gramophone"	"The whole area will hear"	Dabro	Nominated	
