= Pavel Kushnir =

Russian musician and dissident (1984–2024)

- Павел Кушнир
- Born: 19 September 1984; Tambov, Russian SFSR, Soviet Union
- Died: 27 July 2024 (aged 39); Detention center in Birobidzhan, Jewish Autonomous Oblast, Russia
- Education: Tambov State Musical-Pedagogical Institute; Moscow Conservatory

Pavel Mikhailovich Kushnir (Russian: Павел Михайлович Кушнир, 19 September 1984 – 27 July 2024) was a Russian pianist, writer, and political activist, who became the first political prisoner in modern Russia to die during a hunger strike. Born into a musical family in Tambov, Kushnir displayed exceptional talent as a pianist from an early age, performing at 17 the complete cycle of 24 Preludes and Fugues by Shostakovich. After graduating from the Moscow Conservatory in 2007, he worked as a pianist and accompanist in various Russian cities, eventually becoming a soloist with the Birobidzhan Regional Philharmonia in 2023.

Kushnir engaged in civil activism, participating in protests against the annexation of Crimea and the war in Ukraine, and had a small YouTube channel where he criticized the Russian government. He was arrested in 2024 for his videos and accused of making public calls for terrorist activity. Kushnir died on 27 July 2024, in a detention center in Birobidzhan during a dry hunger strike. His death sparked interest in his performances and books.

== Biography ==
=== Early years ===
Pavel Kushnir was born in Tambov on 19 September 1984, in a Jewish family. His father, Mikhail Borisovich Kushnir (1945–2020), was a musician and a teacher at a children's music school, who developed his own method of teaching music to children, widely used in music schools in Russia. His mother, Irina Mikhailovna Levina (born 1944), was a music teacher. His paternal grandfather was a singing teacher and a choral conductor, his grandmother was an accompanist. A child prodigy, Pavel started to play piano at two, and then studied at a music school in Tambov. At the age of 17, Kushnir performed the complete cycle of 24 Preludes and Fugues by Dmitry Shostakovich.

True art can take place in a dorm room. At five in the morning, in the presence of two homeless guys and a room full of drunk bodies, you can brilliantly play Debussy's prelude on a keyboard doused in alcohol and set on fire, and see tears streaming from the eyes of the homeless.

— Kushnir about his first year in Moscow Conservatory (Note: Russian: "Настоящее творчество может происходить в комнате общежития. В пять часов утра, в присутствии двух бомжей и с полной комнатой пьяных тел, можно гениально играть прелюдию Дебюсси на клавиатуре, политой спиртом и подожженной, и видеть проливающиеся из глаз бомжей слезы.")

In 2002, he graduated from the Tambov Rakhmaninov State Musical-Pedagogical Institute and entered the Moscow Conservatory, studying under the People's Artist of the USSR, Victor Merzhanov. He graduated from the conservatory in 2007.

Kushnir wanted to continue his studies in the conservatory, but refused to play a piece from a Schumann Phantasy during the entrance exam, because "it would ruin his interpretation of the performance". He moved to Yekaterinburg and enrolled to the aspiranture of the Urals Mussorgsky State Conservatoire. According to a friend, he was on a "different level", and had conflicts with some people on the faculty. After two years of studies, he was falsely accused of theft, and left the Conservatoire.

=== Career as a pianist ===
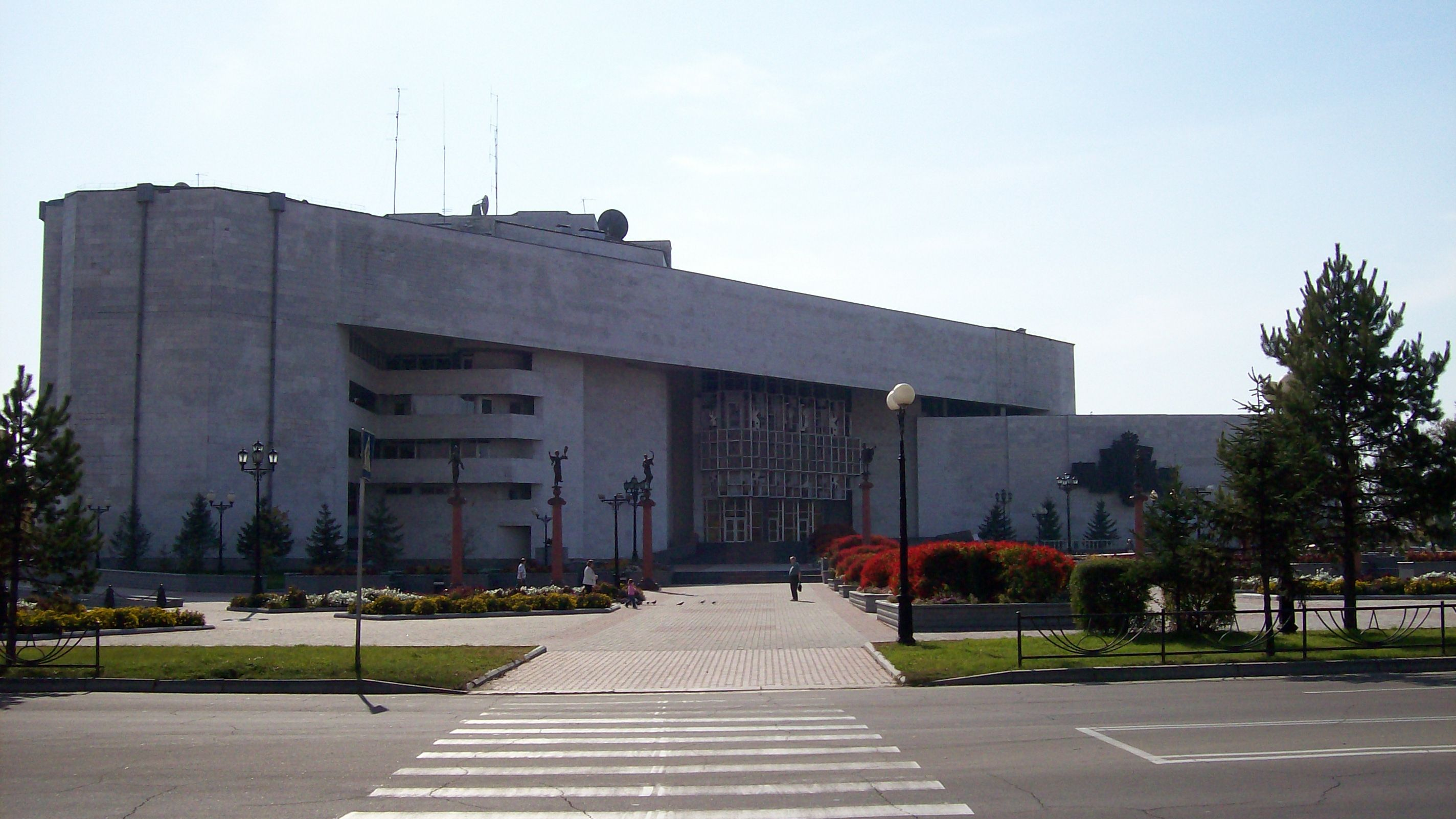
Theatre building, Birobidzhan Regional Philharmonia

Kushnir worked as an accompanist at Tambov State Music and Pedagogical Institute. After graduating from the conservatory, he moved to Yekaterinburg for two years, then worked for seven years in Kursk and three years in Kurgan. In 2023, he became a soloist with the Birobidzhan Regional Philharmonia by invitation from the philharmonia director.

Kushnir made very few recordings. He recorded the cycle of 24 preludes by Sergei Rachmaninoff. Musicologist Mikhail Kazinik praised this performance, noting that "he demonstrated the development of Rachmaninoff's ideas, and he purified it from all overlays, from any pop stylings — he made it crystal clear". For the Bira radio station, Kushnir recorded a cycle "Mazurkas on Wednesdays", for which he performed and analyzed 51 out of 58 Chopin's Mazurkas.

=== Activism and performances ===
While studying at the conservatory, Kushnir "cultivated the image of a dissident"; his friend described him as wearing "a shabby beige overcoat with a bulging pocket. Under the coat he was always dressed in black, and a half-liter bottle of vodka often stuck out of his pocket." He had a nickname, "Hasid".

Pavel Kushnir was involved in civil activism. In 2010, together with a friend he "protested against the heat, walking around the city in winter clothes in 40-degree heat". For a poetic event, he wrote poems in the constructed language Naʼvi from the movie Avatar. He participated in the protests at Bolotnaya Square in 2011–2013, pickets against the war in Donbass and the annexation of Crimea in 2014, and distributed anti-war leaflets in Kursk and Birobidzhan, after the 2022 Russian invasion of Ukraine began. In 2022 and 2023, he held anti-war hunger strikes, firstly one for twenty days, and then for a hundred.

Kushnir was fired from the Birobidzhan Philarmonia because of his political activism.

=== Arrest and death ===
Kushnir had a YouTube channel, named "Foreign agent Mulder", with only five subscribers and four videos. The channel was named after the FBI agent Fox Mulder, from Kushnir's favourite TV series, The X-Files, and Russian foreign agent law. He was arrested by FSB for these videos, in which he called Putin's Russia a "fascist state" and the Bucha massacre "a disgrace to our homeland". Kushnir was accused under "the article on public calls for terrorist activity". (Note: Russian: "[обвинён в] публичных призывах к осуществлению террористическрй деятельности") His case was unknown to human rights activists. He died on 27 July, on the fifth day of a dry hunger strike. He became the first political prisoner in modern Russia to die of a hunger strike.

His friends think that he was beaten in jail, but his mother insisted on a cremation without further investigation. Pavel and his mother and brother had opposing views regarding the war and Russian politics. A few years prior he and his brother had a fight; he then had no contact with the family for two years. There were eleven people at the ceremony in Birobidzhan; his body was then sent to a crematorium in Khabarovsk. His mother and brother did not attend the farewell.

== Legacy and publications ==
Kushnir was almost unknown during his life. He did not seek fame as a musician, and made very few recordings. He believed that the arts should be free to the audience, and refused to advertise himself. He preferred smaller cities, and wanted to stay in Birobidzhan for twelve years, if "not imprisoned, drafted into the army, or fired". He thought that he had more freedom outside of the capital, and hoped that there he could avoid playing at state pro-war concerts. After his death, his friends started writing about his overlooked genius.

His first book, Russian cut-up ("Русская нарезка"), was published in 2014 as print-on-demand by small German publisher Za-Za Verlag, and was completely unnoticed. Made in the cut-up technique, the book consists of Kushnir's diary and pieces of multiple World War II novels. The book was written as an anti-war manifesto after the 2014 war on Donbas; Kushnir compared it to the "advent of a giant hog". (Note: Russian: "с пришествием гигантской свиньи") The book was published in paperback shortly after his death.

In 2022, he finished his second book, Noel, and described it in an interview:

This is a huge text, the form of which exactly repeats the form of Kepler's Harmony of the World. It is a text of 117 episodes, which is divided into five parts, dedicated to the Red Army Faction, in particular to Ulrike Meinhof. This text is written using the vocabulary of 67 languages and cuttings from 170 texts of other authors of all times and peoples. I wrote it for eight years, from 2014 to 2022. (Note: Russian: Это огромный текст, форма которого в точности повторяет форму Кеплера "Гармония мира". Это текст из 117 эпизодов, который разбит на пять частей, посвященный "Фракции Красной армии", в частности, Ульрике Майнхоф. Этот текст написан с использованием лексики 67 языков и нарезки из 170 текстов других авторов всех времен и народов. Я писал его восемь лет, с 2014 по 2022 год.)

The book is unpublished, and the location of the draft is unknown as of August 2024. He sent a draft of another book, The Birobidzhan Diary, to a friend before the arrest. The Diary was published in 2025; in it Kushnir again used the cut-up method using Emmanuil Kazakevich's short story "Zvezda" ("The Star"). Kazakevich was a Soviet Jewish writer, who spent 1930s in Birobidzhan; Zvezda was published in 1947. French-American actress Jean Seberg became Kushnir's "role model" and a hero of the book.

Kushnir wrote the Diary in September–December 2022; it consists of three parts:

the first with chronological entries (from September 22 to October 28, 2022), the second is a chaotic and fragmentary internal monologue, the third is a countdown to Christmas, a kind of anti-war advent. This is a carefully constructed text: in letters, Kushnir wrote that he wanted to turn the diary into a symphonic poem – an homage to Scriabin, whose music he performed at concerts.

The book was edited by writer and publisher Dmitry Volchek, and includes Kushnir's letters, transcripts from Kushnir's YouTube channel, and a long preface by Volchek. The book cover was designed using an unconventional paper material, with water drops applied during the paper-making process while the material is still wet. It created a random, unrepeatable pattern on each cover, making every copy unique, while the drops symbolically represent tears and emotional depth. The first chapter is printed on black paper. The book spread is divided into two parts: on the left is the diary, and on the right are the editor's comments and notes. The Cyrillic font was chosen to look like "tamizdat" broken fonts.

Kushnir wrote several other books, also unpublished: a novel Kosyag and Begemod (Косяг и Бегемод) and a story Dust (Пыль). A book of Kishnir's commentaries on Chopin's Mazurkas is being prepared for publication.

In 2024, a scholarship named after Kushnir was created in London by producer Roman Liberov and entrepreneur Eduard Panteleev. The scholarship is intended for young musicians from Russia, Belarus, and Ukraine who had to move abroad because of the war. A series of concerts in memory of Kushnir was played in European cities. The first concert in Israel was played in Tel Aviv on 25 December 2024, by pianists Oxana Yablonskaya, Ron Regev, and Adam Hen-Adamov. They performed Chopin's Mazurkas, with Kushnir's commentaries read before the performance, and Nirvana's songs.

In 2025, "Rachmaninoff. Preludes", played by Kushnir in 2010, was remastered and released. It is Kushnir's only released music.

== Bibliography ==
- Pavel Kushnir (2017): Uwe Lausen, Life and Art (in Russian)
- Pavel Kushnir (2014). Русская нарезка [Russian cut-up] (PDF) (in Russian). Дюссельдорф: Za-Za Verlag. ISBN 978-1-326-07822-5.
  - Русская нарезка [Russian cut-up] (in Russian) (2 ed.). Berlin: ISIA Media Verlag. 2024. ISBN 978-3-689-59907-2.
- Pavel Kushnir (2025). Биробиджанский дневник [The Birobidzhan Diary] (in Russian). Meduza. ISBN 978-9934-9255-6-6.
