= Peaceful Lights =

Russian-language annual New Year's Eve music special

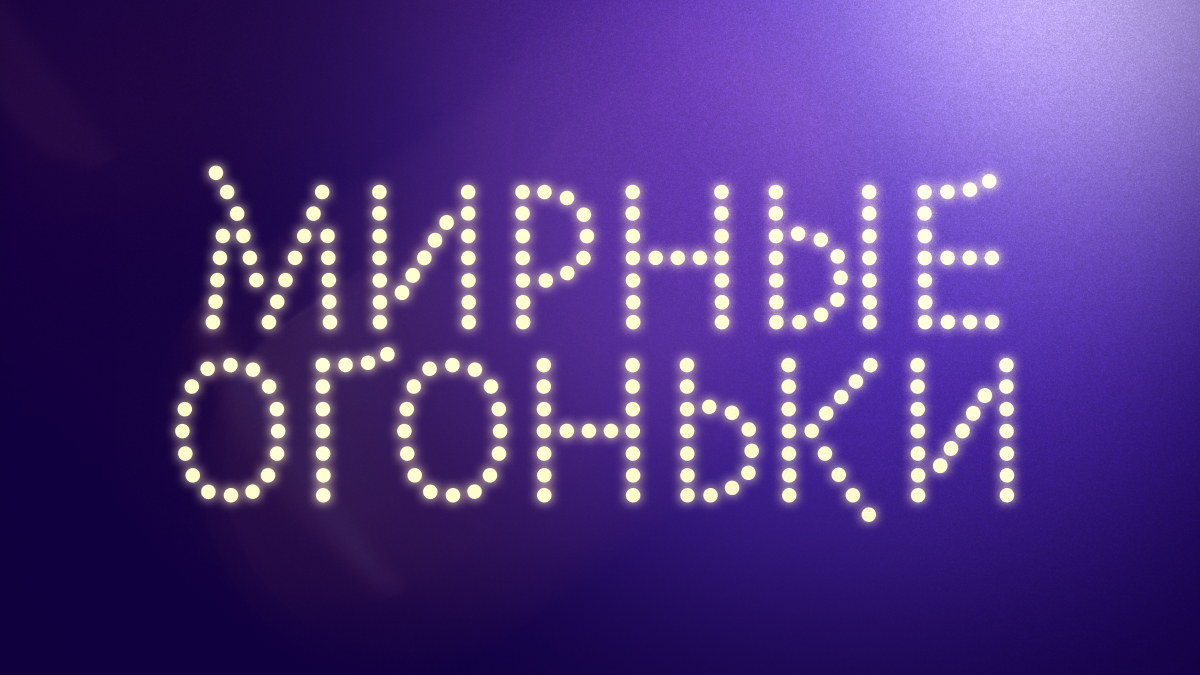
- Russian: Мирные огоньки
- Directed by: Seryozha Rasskazov; Anatoly Svetlov
- Written by: Kirill Sietlov; Konstantin Alexandrov; Anatoly Perasperov
- Based on: Little Blue Light
- Produced by: Seryozha Rasskazov; Boris Sigalov; Boris Barabanov; Andrey Ivanov; Nataly Novak
- Music by: Sergey Adamsky; Sasha Valent
- Production company: M.O. Production
- Release dates: 31 December 2023; 31 December 2024; 31 December 2025
- Running time: approx. 90 minutes
- Language: Russian

Peaceful Lights (Russian: Мирные огоньки, romanized: Mirnye Ogon'ki) is a New Year's Eve (Novy God) musical project created as an alternative to the programs shown on Russian television. It is produced by volunteers, funded through crowdsourced donations, and broadcast on December 31 across various online platforms.

Artists recorded their performances mostly in Europe. The 2024 concert included Evgeny Khavtan, Maxim Leonidov, Tatyana Lazareva, Teona Dolnikova, and Boris Grebenshchikov. The 2025 concert featured Bi-2, Kasta, Noize MC, Monetochka, Aigel and other performers.

According to various estimates, the 2024 concert gathered a total of 650 thousand to 1.2 million viewers.

== Name ==
The producer of the project, Sergey Rasskazov, explains the name of the project as follows:

"You are not alone, there are many of us" - this is the main thing we want to convey to the audience. With our concert, we want to create a sense of community for people, that they are not alone in the whole world, to give support. And this unification also helps to build a bridge between artists and the audience. Artists were no longer shown on TV, and we figured out how to bring them out to the people and return them to New Year's Eve.

== History ==
The project was started in 2023 by Sergey Rasskazov, a designer from Switzerland. According to Sergey, he himself could not find a suitable show for New Year's Eve, and began to think about creating a new one, bringing together artists who oppose the war. After a tweet proposing to "make a New Year's show with production no worse than on Channel One, only oppositional, with jokes about Putin, with toasts for peace, and so on," he was able to find both professional specialists to carry out the filming and donors.

"The tweet went viral, it had about 250,000 views, something like that, there were a couple of other reposts, they gathered a bunch of likes, a bunch of retweets, a bunch of reactions, and it turns out that when this idea came to me, I forced it and it went viral, there were only 2 months left, November and December"

The first groups to agree to participate in the project were Sansara and AloeVera, and the creators of the project began to believe in its success after the actor Aleksandr Filippenko joined it.

For the New Year 2024, more than 10 different artists took part in the "Mirnye Ogonki" concert. They had to work under time constraints, and since the filming took place in December, it was already impossible to arrange for a number of artists to participate.

By the New Year 2025, the organizers of "Mirnye Ogonki" had more time to prepare, which allowed them to film in 13 cities: Berlin, Vilnius, Yerevan, Tbilisi, London, Los Angeles and others. The list of participants expanded: Bi-2, Kasta, Noize MC, Monetochka, Dmitry Nazarov, AloeVera and others took part in the concert. According to one of the founders of the project, Anastasia Morgunova, it was easier to negotiate with the artists, as they already knew about the project. For the first time, the show had a presenter, and the performances of the artists were connected by a common stage concept.

== Reception ==
Russia-based media generally greeted the show critically. Argumenty i Fakty published an article titled "All the Scum Have Gathered," characterizing the show as a "freak show" and accusing the media promoting it of Russophobia. A news article on passion.ru notes the status of foreign agents of many of the concert participants, as well as reproaches for past statements by some of them in support of Ukraine.

== Participants ==
Participants
| Year | Performers |
|---|---|
| 2024 | Vasily Zorky; Sonya Shats; Varvara Shmykova; Aleksandr Filippenko; Ilya Akselrod; Maxim Leonidov; Evgeny Khavtan; Ice Hokku; Anton Dolin; Arsen Beglyarov; Igor Titov Banvivan; Teona Dolnikova; FromScratch; Maksok; OQJAV; Pinhas x Vova Sheqel; WHAT production |
| 2025 | Bi-2; AloeVera; Noize MC; Kasta; Dmitry Nazarov; Olga Vasilyeva; Aigel; Lyudmila Petrushevskaya; Garik Oganisyan; Vasya Oblomov; Anna Drubich; Boris Repetur; Musya Totibadze; Artur Smolyaninov; Monetochka; Irina Prikhodko; NaviBand; Javid Gagulov; Sveta Ben; Galya Chikiss; Alex Norden |
