= Bravo (band) =

Russian rock and roll band

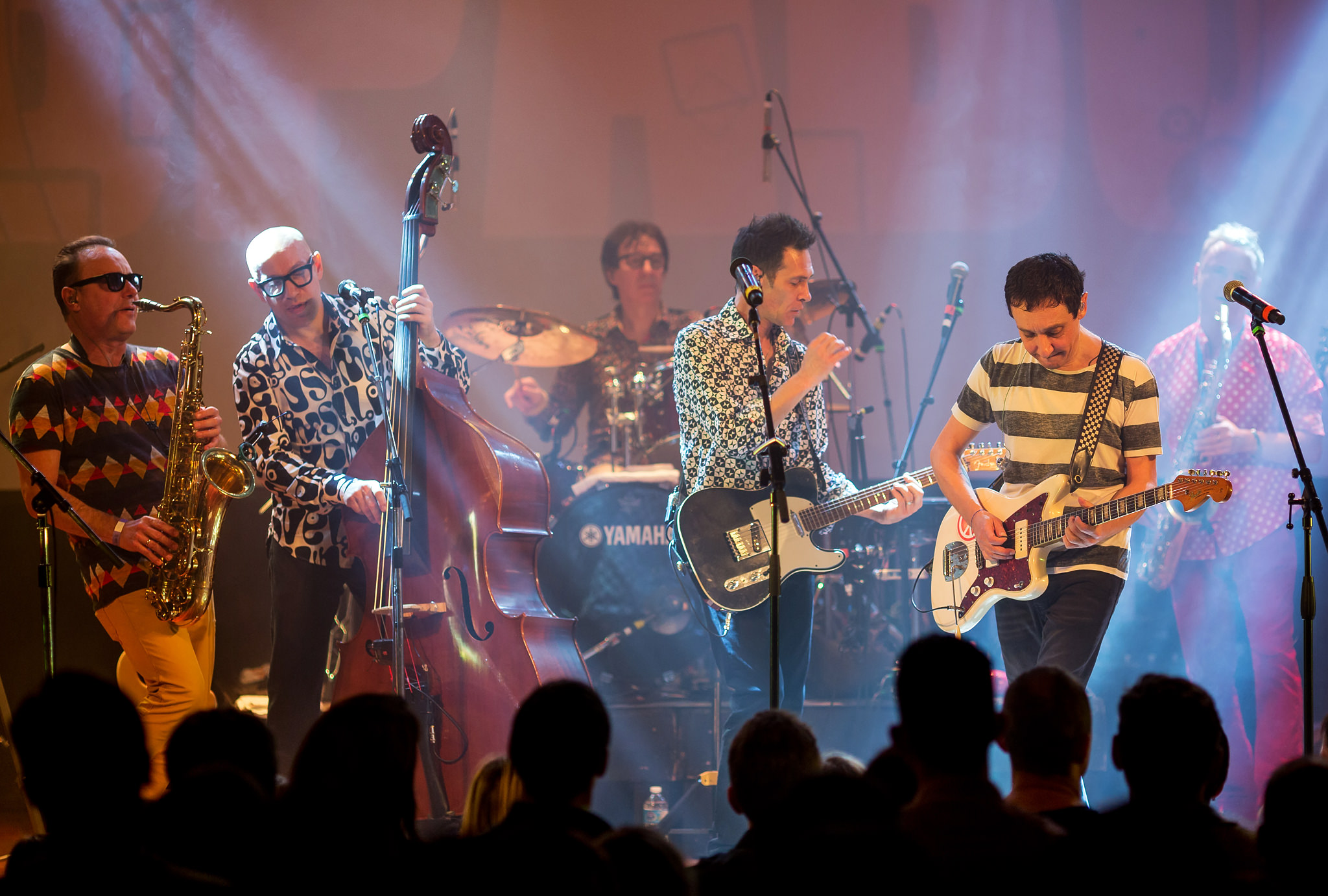
- "The Greatest Hits" concert in The Opera House, Toronto in 2016

Background information
- Origin: Moscow, Russia
- Genres: Pop rock, rock and roll, rockabilly, beat, new wave, swing revival, soft rock
- Years active: 1983–present
- Members: Evgeny Khavtan; Pavel Kuzin; Robert Lenz; Alexander Stepanenko; Dimitriy Ashman
- Past members: Zhanna Aguzarova; Andrei Konusov; Valeriy Syutkin; Aleksey Ivanov; Sergey Lapin; Anna Salmina; Tatyana Ruzaeva; Evgeny Osin; Irina Elifanova; Igor Danilkin; Timur Murtuzaev; Dmitry Gaidukov; Igor Andreev; Fiodor Ponomariov; Aleksey Elenskiy; Sergey Bushkevich; Pavel Markazyan; Denis Mazhukov; Feliks Lakhuti
- Website: www.bravogroup.ru

Bravo (Russian: Браво) is a rock and roll band founded in 1983 in Moscow, Russia, by guitarist Evgeny Khavtan.

== Biography ==
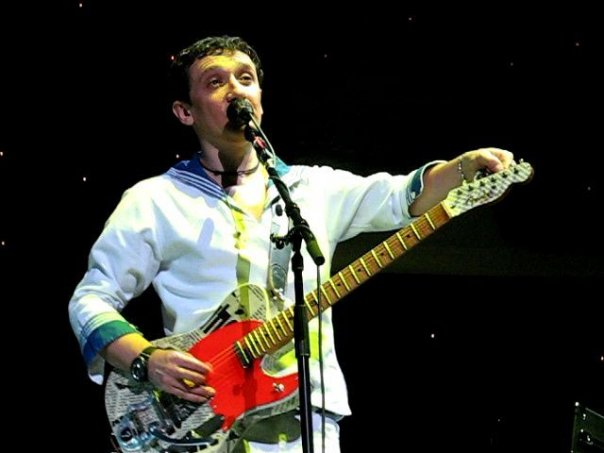
Evgeny Khavtan in 2008

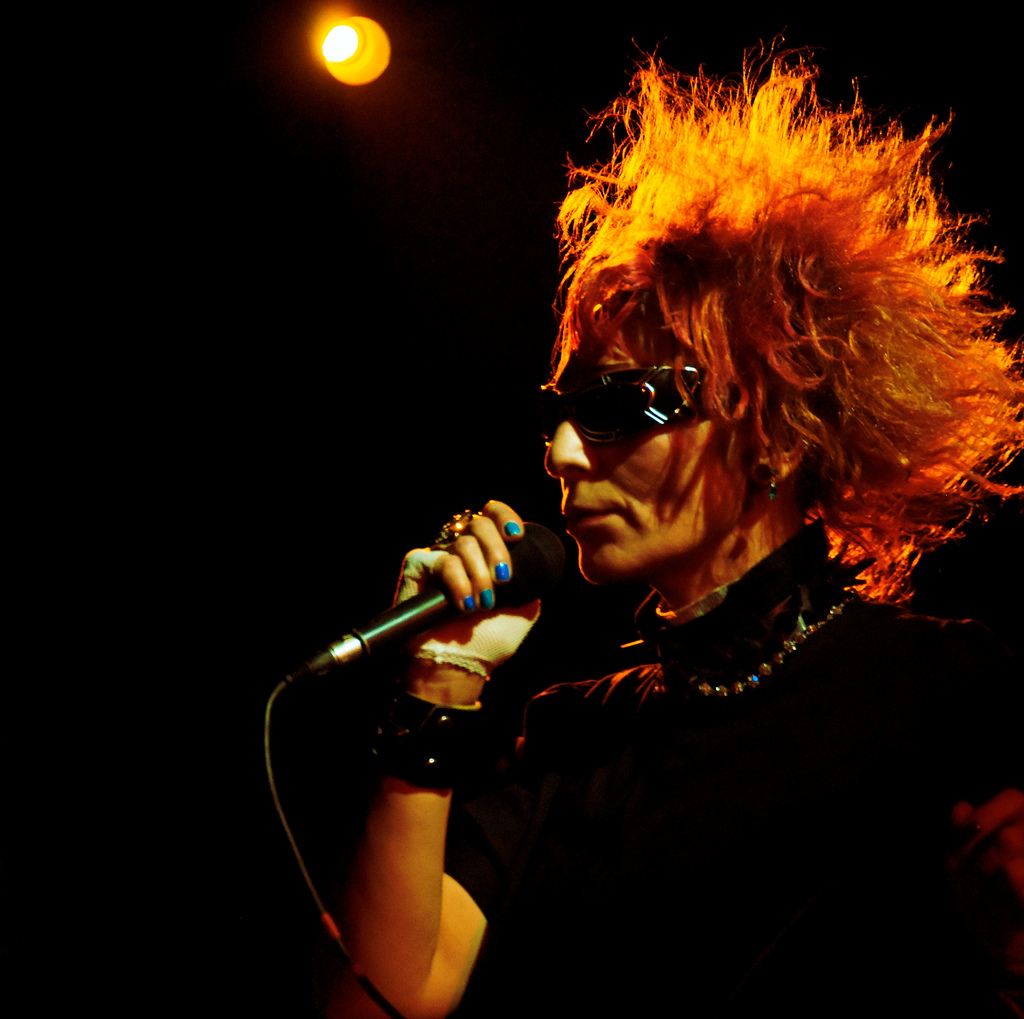
Zhanna Aguzarova in 2007

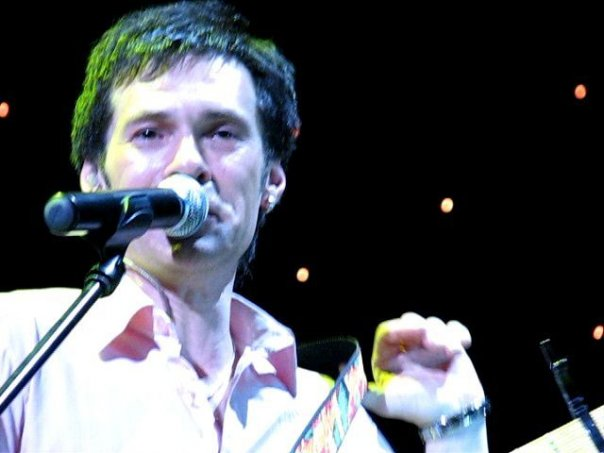
Robert Lenz in 2008

Drawing heavy inspiration from 1950s western music, Bravo was a part of the Soviet rock and roll revival of the 1980s, along with Secret. Their first album was made in 1983.

Despite the fact that at that time rock and roll and beat music (except for The Beatles) were less popular among Soviet citizens than classic rock, the band was one of the most popular underground acts in Russia in the 1980s, until the departure of original lead singer Zhanna Aguzarova in 1988. Since then, Bravo has achieved success with several different singers, Valeriy Syutkin (1990–1994) and Robert Lenz (since 1996).

In 2011, after a ten-year break from studio recordings, Bravo released an album, Fashion (Russian: Мода), which received highly positive reviews from critics and good attention from younger audiences. The band recorded the album using vintage instruments from the 50s and 60s. The album was produced by Ghian Wright. The album cover includes a photograph of Audrey Hepburn from the US-American romantic comedy Roman Holiday.

== Discography ==
=== Studio albums ===
1. Cassette 1983 Кассета 1983 (1983)
2. Cassette 1985 Кассета 1985 (1985)
3. Bravo Браво (1987)
4. Ensemble Bravo Ансамбль Браво (1987)
5. Fops from Moscow Стиляги из Москвы 1990
6. Moscow Beat Московский бит 1993
7. Road to the Clouds Дорога в облака 1994
8. The Wind Knows... (single) Ветер знает... 1995
9. At the Crossroads of Spring На перекрёстках весны 1996
10. Serenade 2000 EP Серенада 2000 1997
11. Hits about Love Хиты про любовь 1998
12. Eugenics Евгеника 2001
13. Fashion Мода 2011
14. Forever Навсегда 2015

=== Compilations and live albums ===
1. Zhanna Aguzarova and Bravo Жанна Агузарова и Браво (1993)
2. Live in Moscow (1994)
3. Songs from Various Years Песни разных лет (1995)
4. The Star Catalog (tribute) Звёздный каталог (2004)
5. 30 Years. Concert in Stadium Live 30 лет. Концерт в Stadium Live (2014)
6. Bravospective Бравоспектива (2017)

== Awards and nominations ==
Award	Year	Nominee(s)	Category	Result	Ref.
Поколение	1996	"Ветер знает"	People's Choice Award	Won	
