= Evgeni Gabrielev =

Russian-born artist and photographer (born 1957)

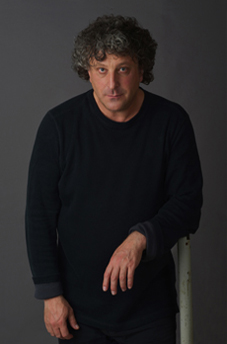
- Born: Evgeni Gabrielev; 1957 (age 67–68); Tomilino, USSR
- Education: Graduated from VGIK
- Known for: Photography, Book design, Graphic art
- Notable work: Russian Charisma: An Attempt at Definition" from the series "Art and Power"

Evgeni Gabrielev (1957, Tomilino) is a Russian-born artist and photographer. Known for his portrait photography and book design.

== Biography ==
Gabrielev was born in Tomilino village, Moscow. Graduated from the Gerasimov Institute of Cinematography (VGIK).

Member of The Union of artist of Russia.

== Selected projects ==
"Pic & Stich", HMS President, London

"Holidays", Holly Blossom Tempel, Art foundation, Toronto, Canada

“Forgotten Dream," MEG, Toronto, Canada

“Russian Charisma: An Attempt at Definition, from the series "Art and Power", V.A. Tropinin Museum, Moscow

“Transgression," The State Museum of Oriental Art, Moscow

"Stranger's Dream", Kovcheg gallery, Moscow

“Art of a modern photo, Russia. Ukraine. Belarus", Central House of Artists, Moscow.

“New," The New York Hilton & Towers, New York, NY

"They are different", Art Modern, Moscow

Visual concept and realization of the book series "Visuality Sketches" since 2003. The New Literary Review, Moscow.

Book projects have been displayed at the International, Frankfurt Book Fair and Moscow international book fair "NON/FICTION".

Artworks are part of the Russian Museum collection, St. Petersburg, private and corporate collections in Europe, Canada and US.

== References in other media ==
http://www.informprostranstvo.ru/N09_2008/master.html

"Evgeni Gabrielev Time in Amber" by Irina Tchmyreva. ZOOM. 2009-10-02.

"MOCKBA, ЗДPAВCTBУЙTE!" by Annie Daubenton. RADIO FRANCE. 1996-02-01.

"Дорогой, Многоуважаемый Стул", Федор Ромер. НЕЗАВИСИМАЯ ГАЗЕТА. 1996-02-07.

"Выставка Евгения Габриелева «В поисках русской харизмы» в музее В.А.Тропинина", Владимир Сальников. Сегодня. 1996-01-30.

"Венский стул, или В Поисках – Русской Харизмы", Феликс Светов. Русская мысль. No.4122. 1996-04-18/24.

"Charisma…" by Oleg Aronson. VIP-Premier. 1996-02-01.
