= Roman Liberov =

Russian documentary film director

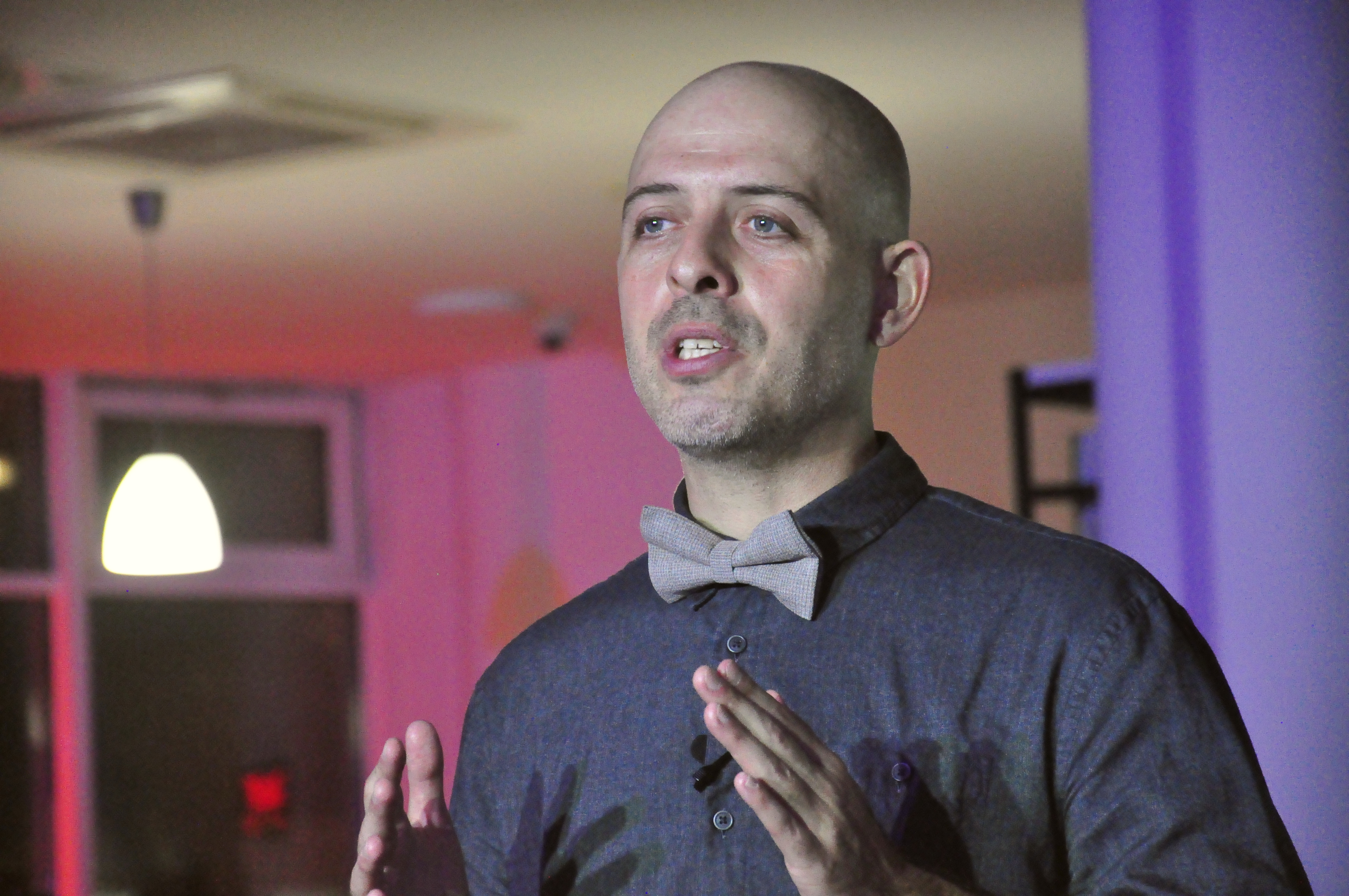
- Born: Roman Alexandrovich Liberov; June 13, 1980 (age 46); Vilnius, Lithuanian SSR
- Education: Gerasimov Institute of Cinematography
- Occupations: Filmmaker; producer; screenwriter
- Years active: 2009–present

Roman "Roma" Liberov (Russian: Рома́н Алекса́ндрович Ли́беров; born 13 June 1980) is a Russian documentary filmmaker, screenwriter, producer, and the founder of the Ulysses Foundation for the Support and Preservation of Culture.

== Early life and background ==
Liberov was born in the Lithuanian SSR.

By his own admission, he did not graduate from high school. His father helped him get a high school diploma with all C's.

Graduated from the Gerasimov Institute of Cinematography in 2007, majoring in non-fiction film directing (his mentor was Tengiz Semenov), interned at the BBC in London, then worked as a director on British television.

He was the host of an evening program on Silver Rain Radio (with Vladimir Raevsky).

Liberov was a frequent guest of the section about modern poets in the TV show "Rules of Life" on TV Kultura channel. Liberov lectured on film, literature, and the fine arts. He organized poets' and writers' commemoration meetings.

In January 2021, Liberov left Russia.

== Career ==
Since 2009, he has been working on a series of films commemorating Russian writers, in which he uses non-fiction and staged filming, animation, puppetry and shadow play, installations, computer graphics, etc. His projects involve famous Soviet and Russian actors: Armen Dzhigarkhanyan, Valentin Gaft, Inna Churikova, Sergei Makovetsky, Viktor Sukhorukov, Chulpan Khamatova, Sergei Puskepalis, and others.

Since 2016, as a producer and director, he has been holding a series of poetry readings "By the author" (Russian: "От автора"). The first two years the events were held in the Gulag History Museum, and since 2018 they have been held in the New Space of the Theatre of Nations. The invited poet not only read his selected works but also talked about them and himself. Each evening was filmed in detail, creating a film archive of contemporary Russian poetry.

Liberov is the author and publisher of a series of "By hand" (Russian: "От руки") comics created by dozens of contemporary young artists based on selected poetic texts from such poets, as Vladislav Khodasevich to Dmitri Prigov. A series of poetic zines formed the basis of two exhibition projects at the Marina Tsvetaeva House Museum in 2017 and 2018.

On January 13, 2023, the music compilation album After Russia, produced by Liberov, was released. This collection contains songs performed by popular Russian musicians who were forced to leave Russia because of their anti-war stance after the outbreak of hostilities in Ukraine. The songs are written with lyrics by Russian émigré poets who also left Russia 100 years ago. Performers include the Noize MC, Monetochka, Nogu Svelo!, Pornofilmy, Naiv, Red Samara Automobile Club, AloeVera, Sansara, Tequilajazzz, and others.

== Style ==
In his work, Liberov combines animation, puppetry, graphics, acting, photography, and documentary filming. Journalists call his style quasi-documentary cinema. Liberov pays much attention to the musical design of his films. The music of the Grazhdanskaya Oborona and Shortparis bands sounds in his films. In the visual language, the director tries to convey the literary style of the writer about whom the film is made. This is how Alexander Mamontow, film director, producer, actor, and the founder of the Festival of Festivals film festival, described Roman Liberov's style:

In his new film, the director has found the most compelling visual language to make us feel both the Soviet realities and [Andrei] Platonov’s prose and that prompted this prose to emerge. This language transmits and reflects the feelings of illiterate people, the peasants, who were facing the new reality, a world where [Soviet] mass repressions and the annihilation of dissident human beings not only becomes commonplace but were even presented as a necessary means of achieving a bright better future for those who survived the [Communist party] purges. And while no boats are being sent today, the dissidents are not welcome at home, once again.

== Filmography ==
- 2009 — Yury Olesha. Nicknamed "The Writer"
- 2010 — Joseph Brodsky. A Conversation with a Heaven-dweller
- 2011 — One Day of Zhora Vladimov
- 2012 — Written by Sergei Dovlatov
- 2013 — ILFANDPETROV
- 2015 — Save my words forever (In memory of Osip Mandelstam)
- 2020 — The Innermost Man (based on the works and biography of Andrei Platonov)
- 2024 — In Search of Daniil Kharms (in progress)

== Exhibitions ==
- 2016 — One-storied America: Based on a True Story at the Moscow Museum of Modern Art
- 2017 — By hand, part one at the Marina Tsvetaeva House Museum
- 2018 — By hand, part two at the Marina Tsvetaeva House Museum
- 2019 — Save my words forever on the anniversary of Osip Mandelstam's death at the Jewish Museum and Tolerance Center
- 2019—2020 — Ilya Ilf - registered in Moscow! The Story of One Room at the Bulgakov Museum in Moscow
- 2020 — Ilya Ilf – a Muscovite from Odessa! A Writer with a Camera at the Gilyarovsky Center

=== Projects ===
- Director and producer of Mikhail Gendelev commemoration meeting from the Poems About Me series with Anna Gerasimova and others.
- Author and director of the composition for voice and trumpet in memory of Osip and Nadezhda Mandelstam Save my words forever performed by Yuliya Rutberg and Vyacheslav Gaivoronsky for the anniversary of the death of Osip Mandelstam.
- Co-writer of the lyrics for the album We Will Get Better by Sansara.
- A selection of lyrics for the album November by Megapolis.
- Curator of the Rock Samizdat auction, for which the collection of the music producer and journalist Alexander Kushner was exhibited. As a result, the collection was purchased by Liberov and Ivan Yefimov themselves and is currently being replenished with the goal of creating a Museum of Russian Rock. A limited edition catalog of rock publishing in the USSR was published for the auction.
- Author and producer of Save My Words Forever a tribute album to the 130th anniversary of Osip Mandelstam, which was recorded by Alina Pash, Zhenya Milkovsky (Nervy), Svidanie, Ilya Lagutenko and Kudamir Katitsa, Zoloto, Shortparis, Leonid Agutin, Mgzavrebi, IOWA, Alina Orlova, Daniel Shake, Pornofilmy, Alexander Manotskov, OQJAV, Tequilajazzz, Noize MC, Billy Novik and St. Petersburg Jazz Active, O! Margo feat. Obe Dve, Sansara, Oxxxymiron and Kurara.
