= Arsha Ovanesova =

Soviet Armenian filmmaker (1906–1990)

- Արշա Օվանեսովա
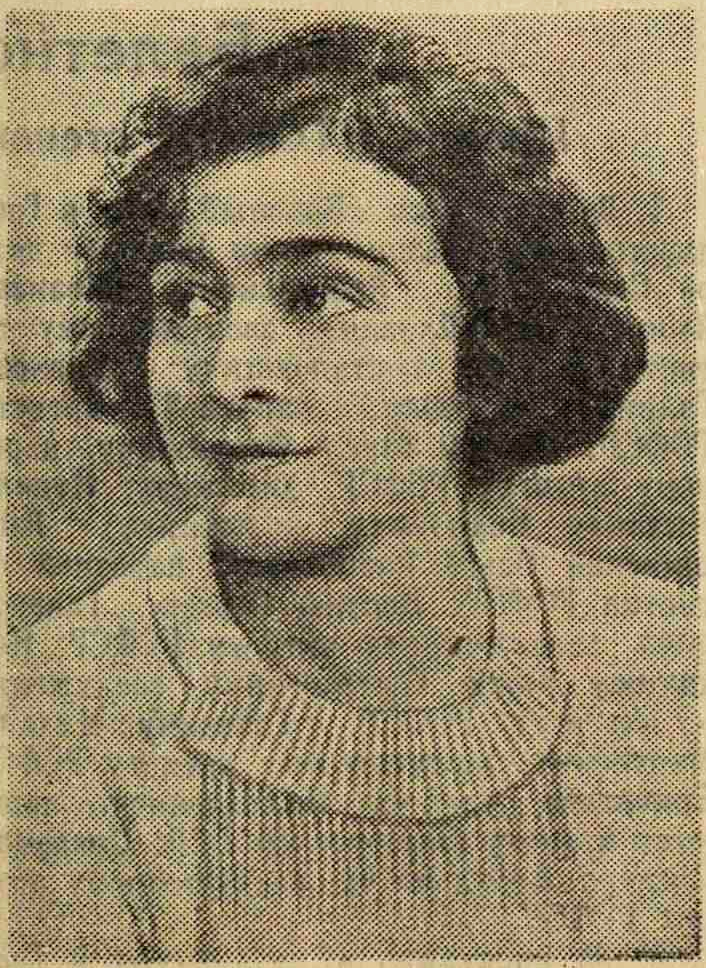
- Born: December 23, 1906; Baku or Shusha, Elizavetpol Governorate, Russian Empire
- Died: May 6, 1990 (aged 83); Moscow, Soviet Union
- Burial place: Troyekurovskoye Cemetery
- Education: Gerasimov Institute of Cinematography
- Occupations: Film director; screenwriter; actress
- Spouse: Semyon Sheynin
- Children: 2

Arsha Amartsumovna Ovanesova (Armenian: Արշա Օվանեսովա, Russian: Арша Амбарцумовна Ованесова; 23 December 1906 – 6 May 1990) was a Soviet Armenian documentary film director, screenplay writer, actress, and educator.

== Biography ==
Arsha Ovanesova was born in either Shusha or Baku in the Russian Empire. At the age of 13, her mother died. From 1918 to 1919, she lived in Persia to escape the Russian Revolution and the Islamic Army of the Caucasus; followed by a moved in 1920 to Baku.

She attended Gerasimov Institute of Cinematography (VGIK) from 1926 to 1932, where she graduated from. From 1931 to 1961, Ovanesova was a director at the Soyuzkinohronika (now Russian Central Studio of Documentary Films). She helped found Pioneer (newsreel), as well as serving as the director and editor of the filmed newsreel from 1931 to 1946. Her film Unusual Encounters (1958) traces the lives of the people in the early publication of Pioneer, spanning 20 years. She taught film at Gerasimov Institute of Cinematography, starting in 1947.

In 1943, she became a member of the Communist Party of the Soviet Union (CPSU). She became a Honored Art Worker of the RSFSR (1947). In 1950 she received the Stalin Prize and the International Peace Prize.

She died on May 6, 1990, and is buried at Troyekurovskoye Cemetery in Moscow. Ovanesova was married to cameraman Semyon Sheynin, who survived her.

== Filmography ==
=== Writer ===
- 1949, World Youth Festival (Russian: Юность мира, romanized: Yunost mira; Hungarian: A világ ifjúsága)
- 1954, The Secret of Mountain Lake (Russian: Тайна горного озера, romanized: Lernayin ltchi gaghtniqe)

=== Director ===
- 1940, Pioneer Truth (Russian: Пионерская правда)
- 1946, A Story About Our Children (Russian: Повесть о наших детях)
- 1948, 30 Years of the Komsomol (Russian: 30 лет комсомола)
- 1949, World Youth Festival (Russian: Юность мира, romanized: Youth of the World), a documentary about the World Festival of Youth and Students event.
- 1958, Unusual Encounters (Russian: Необыкновенные встречи, lit. 'Usual Meeting')
