= Youth (Dabro EP) =

EP by Dabro
- Released: 6 November 2020
- Language: Russian
- Label: Make It Music

Youth (Russian: "Юность") is the third EP by Russian pop-group Dabro. The EP consists of seven tracks, including two previously released tracks, "Юность" and "Все за одного". The album was released on 6 November 2020 through the label Make It Music. The album was created in the studio AvtoRadio on 11 December 2020.

== Background ==
The tracks "Юность" and "Все за одного" were previously released. The track "На крыше" was featured on the soundtrack for the film Музыка крыш.

== Critical reception ==
The album received five stars out of ten.

== Track listing ==
Youth track listing
No.	Title	Length
1.	"Белая луна"	2:48
2.	"Она не такая"	3:28
3.	"Все за одного"	3:24
4.	"Почему так происходит"	3:26
5.	"На крыше"	3:18
6.	"Юность"	3:39
7.	"Тебе лучше меня не знать"	3:17

== Awards and nominations ==
Awards and nominations for Youth
Year	Award	Category	Work	Results	Ref.
2021	Премия Муз-ТВ	Best Song	"Юность"	Nominated	
