= The Secret of Mountain Lake =

1954 film by Alexander Rou

- Russian: Тайна горного озера
- Directed by: Aleksandr Rou
- Written by: Vakhtang Ananyan (novel); Maro Yerzinkyan; Arsha Ovanesova
- Starring: Gurgen Gabrielyan; Ye. Harutyunyan; V. Danielyan; George Ashughyan; Tatul Dilakyan; Arus Asryan
- Cinematography: Ivan Dildaryan; Dmitriy Feldman
- Music by: Ashot Satyan
- Release date: 1954
- Running time: 69 minute
- Country: Soviet Union

The Secret of Mountain Lake (Russian: Тайна горного озера) is a 1954 Soviet adventure film directed by Aleksandr Rou.

== Plot ==
In the fields and gardens of a large village in the mountains of Armenia there is a severe drought. In the past, there was a legend, according to which a river flowed here, but a monster named Deve hid its waters from the inhabitants of the village. Suddenly the village is visited by a group of geologists. Residents of the village of Kamo, Nikita and Grikor decide to help them.

== Starring ==
- Gurgen Gabrielyan as Grandfather Asatur
- Ye. Harutyunyan as Granny Nargiz
- Vancetti Danielyan as Aram Mikhailovich
- George Ashughyan as Bagrat Stepanovich (as G. Ashughyan)
- Tatul Dilakyan as Eghishe
- Arus Asryan as Sona
- Leonid Leonidov as Andrey Petrovich
- Vahagn Bagratuni as Geologist (as V. Bagratuni)
- Garri Musheghyan as Geologist (as G. Musheghyan)
- Lilik Hovhannisyan as Karine
- B. Kerobyan as Dev
- Nerses Hovhannisyan as Kamo
