= Aram Satyan =

Armenian composer and songwriter (born 1947)

Aram Satyan Արամ Սաթյան
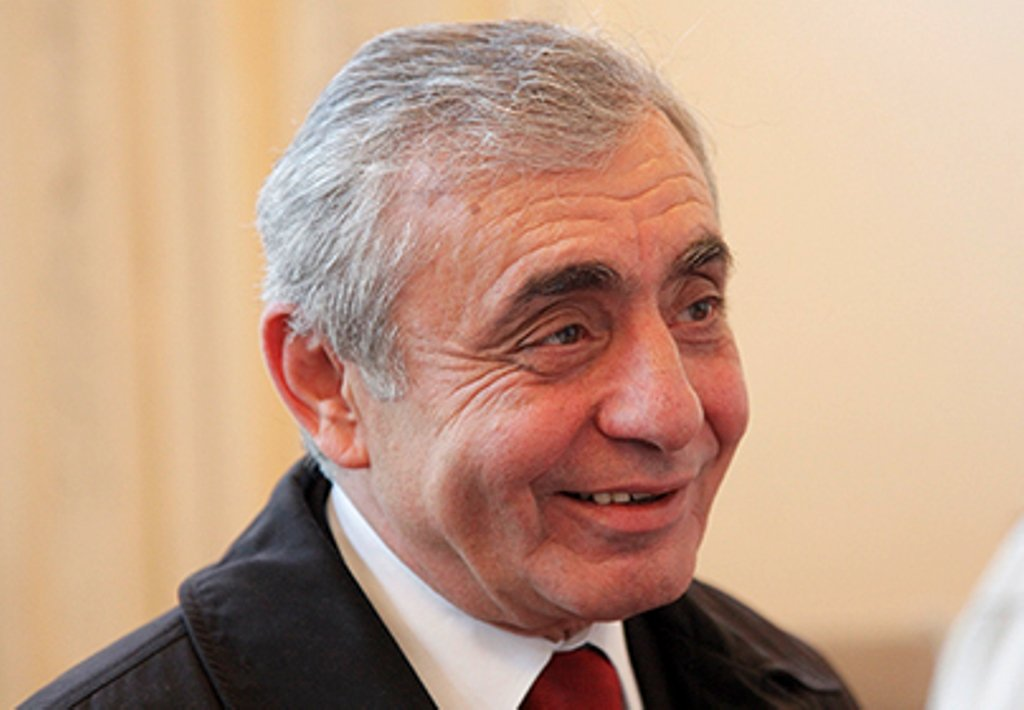

Background information
- Born: May 23, 1947; Yerevan, Armenia
- Occupation: Composer

| Awards = Honored Artist of Armenia, Gold Medal of the Ministry of Culture of Armenia, Movses Khorenatsi Medal, Order of 1st degree Merit for the Fatherland

Aram Satyan (also Satian) (Armenian: Արամ Սաթյան; born 23 May 1947) is an Armenian classical composer and popular music songwriter.

== Biography ==
Aram Satyan was born in Yerevan (Armenia) into the second generation of a musical family. His father Aram Satunc (Satyan) and uncle Ashot Satyan were also notable composers. He studied at the Romanos Melikian Music College under Armenian composer and educator Edvard Baghdasaryan and then later at the Armenian State Conservatory with Edvard Mirzoyan and Alexander Arutiunian. In 1970 Satyan went on to postgraduate study at the Moscow Conservatory with Tikhon Khrennikov. At the time, Khrennikov was Chairman of the Union of Soviet Composers. On his advice, Satyan joined the union in 1971.

His awards include First Prize in the 1969 Young Composers Review held in Moscow, for his Symphonic Variations. He went on to win national competitions in 1971, 1972, 1975, 1977 and 1979. In 1981, he won the Armenian Communist Union State Award. In addition to his symphonies and concertos, he has also composed over 300 songs, music for film and theatre productions, and two pop operas: Lilit and Little Cakhes. Lilit was composed in 1983 and described as the first Armenian work ever composed in this style.

Satyan resides in Armenia and is still actively engaged as a composer and performer.

== Pop songs ==
Aram Satyan is widely known for his pop songs which were also popular in Soviet Union and received numerous awards at "Song of the Year" Contests - "My Story of First Love" (1976), "If You Remember" (1985), "Prayer of Hope" (1991). In 1986 Yurmala All-Union Competition his songs "The Love is Gone" and "Promise of Spring" performed by Narine Harutyunian received the 1st Prize.

== Satyan musical dynasty ==
- Ashot Satyan 1906–1958
- Aram Satunc (Satyan) 1913–1990
- Aram Satyan 1947–
- Ashot Satyan Jr. 1965–
- Arthur Satyan 1973–
- David Satian 1979–
- Lilit Satyan 1981–
- Ruben Satyan 1982–

== Sources ==
- Amirkhanian, Charles, Program notes: Miatsoom, NTR radio
- Asbarez, "President Meets With Representatives of Cultural Parliament" 16 December 1999
- La Médiathèque, Program Notes: Trente ans de musique soviétique 1953-1983 (Track 17. Aram Satian: Poème, pour violoncelle et piano (1969))
- Makarian, Marieta, "Aram Satian Receives Highest Ministerial Award", Azg 31 May 2007
- Petrossian, Konstantin, "Aram Satyan's "Lilit" Opera in Yerevan", Armenian Reporter, 7 January 2006. Accessed via subscription 1 October 2010.
