= Union of Composers of Armenia =

- Հայաստանի Կոմպոզիտորների Միություն

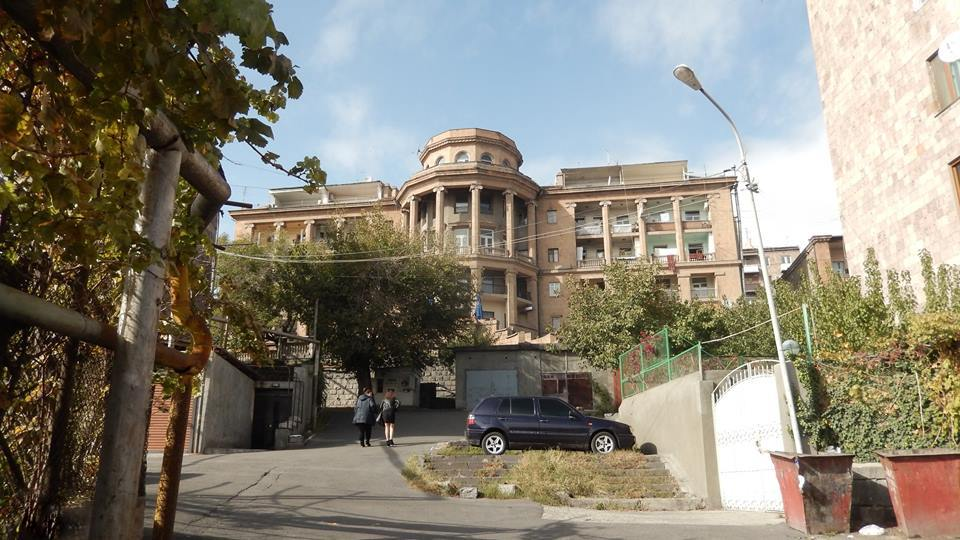
- Headquarters in Yerevan
- Abbreviation: UCA
- Established: 1932; 94 years ago
- Type: Professional association, trade union
- Location: Armenia
- Field: Composing
- Website: composers.am

The Union of Composers of Armenia (Armenian: Հայաստանի Կոմպոզիտորների Միություն) is a non-governmental organization that unites and officially represents professional composers and musicologists in Armenia. The Union was established in 1932. Currently, the Chairman of the Union is Aram Satian, who succeeded Robert Amirkhanyan in 2013.

== See also ==
- Music of Armenia
