= Vera Musaelyan =

Russian singer, musician, and songwriter

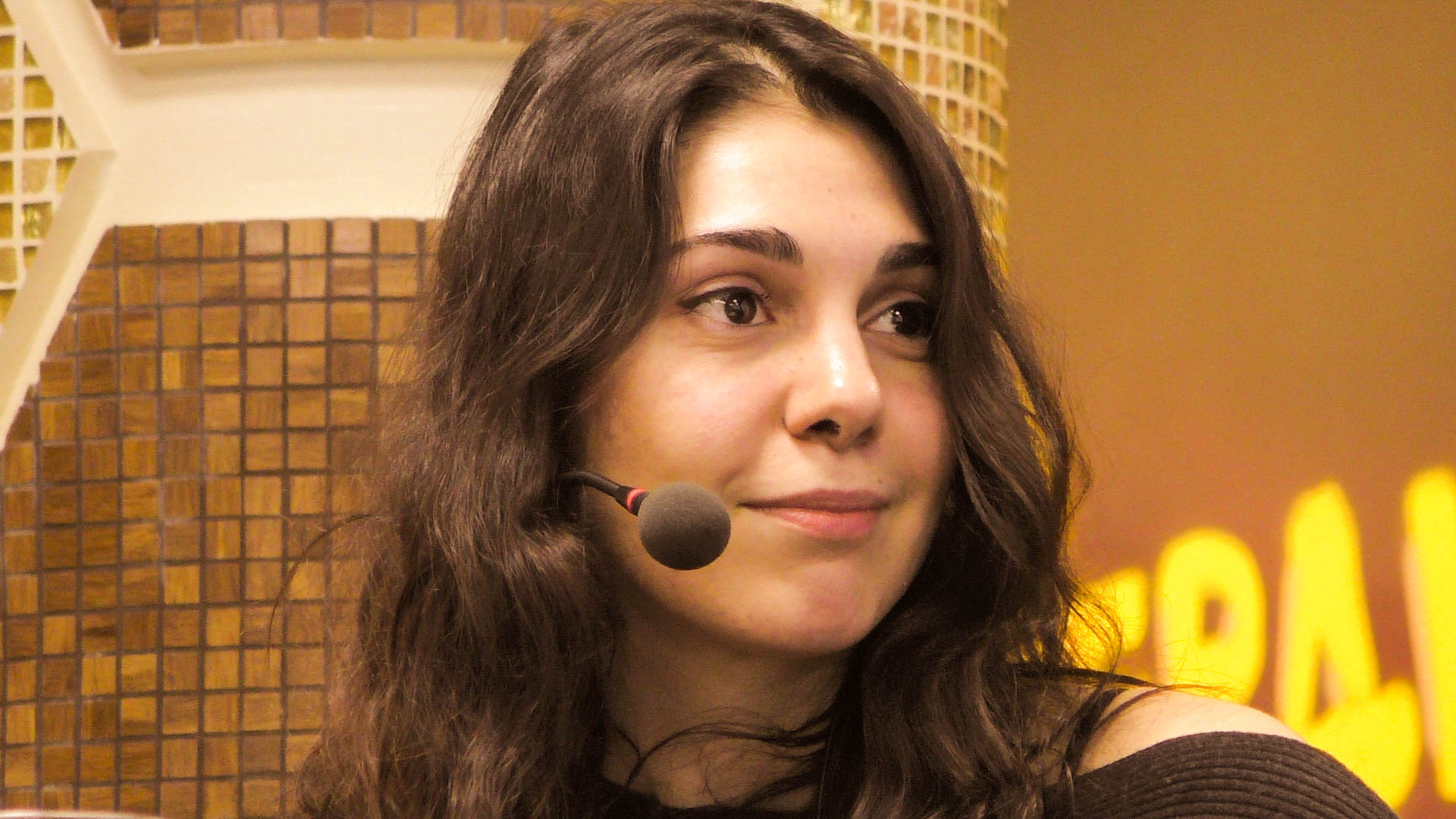

Background information
- Born: Vera Vyacheslavovna Musaelyan; January 29, 1988 (age 38); Nizhny Tagil, Sverdlovsk Oblast, Russian SFSR, Soviet Union
- Origin: Russia
- Genres: Indie pop; Pop rock; Jazz fusion (mostly); Electropop; Acoustic rock (occasionally)
- Occupations: Singer; Songwriter; Musician
- Instruments: Vocals; Keyboards
- Years active: 2011–present
- Member of: AloeVera
- Formerly of: Alai Oli

Vera Vyacheslavovna Musaelyan (born January 29, 1988, in Nizhny Tagil, Sverdlovsk Oblast) is a Russian singer, musician, and songwriter. She is the founder, lead singer, and leader of the pop rock band AloeVera.

== Biography ==
Vera Musaelyan was born on January 29, 1988, in Nizhny Tagil to a mixed Armenian-Azerbaijani family. At the age of 16, she moved to Yekaterinburg, where she entered the Faculty of Economics at the Ural State Technical University (USTU-UPI), but a year later transferred to the Faculty of Journalism at Ural State University (USU). During her student years, she became acquainted with the Yekaterinburg music scene, was a keyboardist in the band Alai Oli, and socialized with members of the bands Sansara and Kurara.

In 2009, Musaelyan lost her voice for six months. After consulting a phoniatrist, who advised her to take up singing, Vera began taking singing lessons and performing in a Japanese restaurant, singing songs by Nina Simone and Ella Fitzgerald. In 2011, she founded her own band, AloeVera.

In 2022, after the start of the Russian invasion of Ukraine, Musaelyan left Russia. In October 2023, she announced that she had received a residence permit in Germany and moved to Berlin.

== Career ==
The band AloeVera was founded in Yekaterinburg in 2011. The band's musical style can be described as pop-rock and cute rock. Musaelyan herself describes the band's work as songs about "a feeling of freedom." The lyrics of AloeVera's songs are notable for their frankness and provocativeness. Musaelyan herself notes that she only writes about what she has experienced herself and does not know how to come up with fictional stories.

== Censorship and Blacklisting ==
In the summer of 2021, AloeVera began to experience problems with holding concerts. Musaelyan attributed this to her civic position and marriage to opposition politician Ilya Yashin. In November 2021, the first known list of banned artists appeared, which included AloeVera.

After the start of Russia's full-scale invasion of Ukraine, the band was placed on another "blacklist," which at that time included 22 artists. AloeVera attempted to hold "secret concerts" in Moscow clubs, but these attempts were thwarted. In February 2024, Meduza published a new list of "banned" artists, including 50 names, which again included AloeVera.

== Personal life ==
She was married to opposition politician Ilya Yashin. The wedding took place in September 2020. In July 2021, personal photos of Musaelyan and Yashin were leaked online. In October 2021, the couple announced their divorce. Musaelyan cited "different views on life" as the reason for the separation.

In July 2022, she was involved in an accident in Bali, and treatment required surgery on her collarbone.

Musaelyan was diagnosed with an eating disorder (bulimia nervosa), which she struggled with for several years, sharing her experience on her blog.

Vera speaks Eastern Armenian with a Baku accent.
