= Valentina Yermolova =

Soviet and Ukrainian writer (1940–2023)

Valentyna Ivanivna Yermolova (7 February 1940 - 19 February 2023) was a Soviet and Ukrainian writer and screenwriter. Member of the National Union of Cinematographers of Ukraine (1978) and National Union of Writers of Ukraine (1979). Honored Worker of Culture of Ukraine (2000).

== Early life and education ==
Valentyna Yermolova was born on 7 February 1940 in Staroaleyka village, Altai Krai, in the worker’s family.

== Career ==
From 1957 to 1960, she worked in newspapers and on television. In 1967, Yermolova graduated from the screenwriting faculty of the All-Russian State Institute of Cinematography, named after S. A. Gerasimov. From 1967 to 1971, she worked as a screenwriter for Kyivnaukfilm.

Yermolova is laureate of the Literary Prize named after. V. Korolenko (1990), international literary prize named after. Yu. Dolgoruky (2004), awarded the Order of Merit, III degree (2011), the Order of Friendship (2003).

She was a chairman of the Ukrainian Society of Russian Culture "Rus", the Association of Russian and Russian-language writers of Ukraine. From 2006 to 2010 she was a member of the Council on Ethno-National Policy.

Valentyna Yermolova died on 19 February 2023.

== Works ==
=== Books ===
- In a Thunderstorm on a Swing (story)
- Men's Walks (story)
- The Planet Water (novel)
- And the Merry Feast of Life (novel)
- The Dust of Our Destinies (novel)
- The Ghosts of the Squares (novel)
- My Evening Garden (2014, novel)

=== Documentary film scripts ===
- My Land, My Destiny (1967, documentary film directed by Teimuraz Zoloev)
- Muscles - XX century (1967, prize in Cortina d'Ampezzo)
- In a Beautiful and Crazy World (1969, directed by Lidia Ostrovska)
- The Red Coal of the Planet (1973, directed by Iziaslav Staviskyi)
- Thoughts on Fashion (1974)
- Reflections on Curiosity (1974, co-authored, directed by Oleksand Igishev )
- Reminder (1975)
- Contacts (1975, directed by Viktor Olender. Diploma of the International Film Festival of Short Films, Czechoslovakia)
- They Ran Away from Their Native Home (1976, directed by Liudmyla Mikhalevich).
