= Gerasimov Institute of Cinematography =

Film school in Moscow, Russia

Coordinates: 55°50′06″N 37°38′15″E

S. A. Gerasimov All-Russian State University of Cinematography
- Всероссийский государственный институт кинематографии имени С. А. Герасимова (ВГИК).
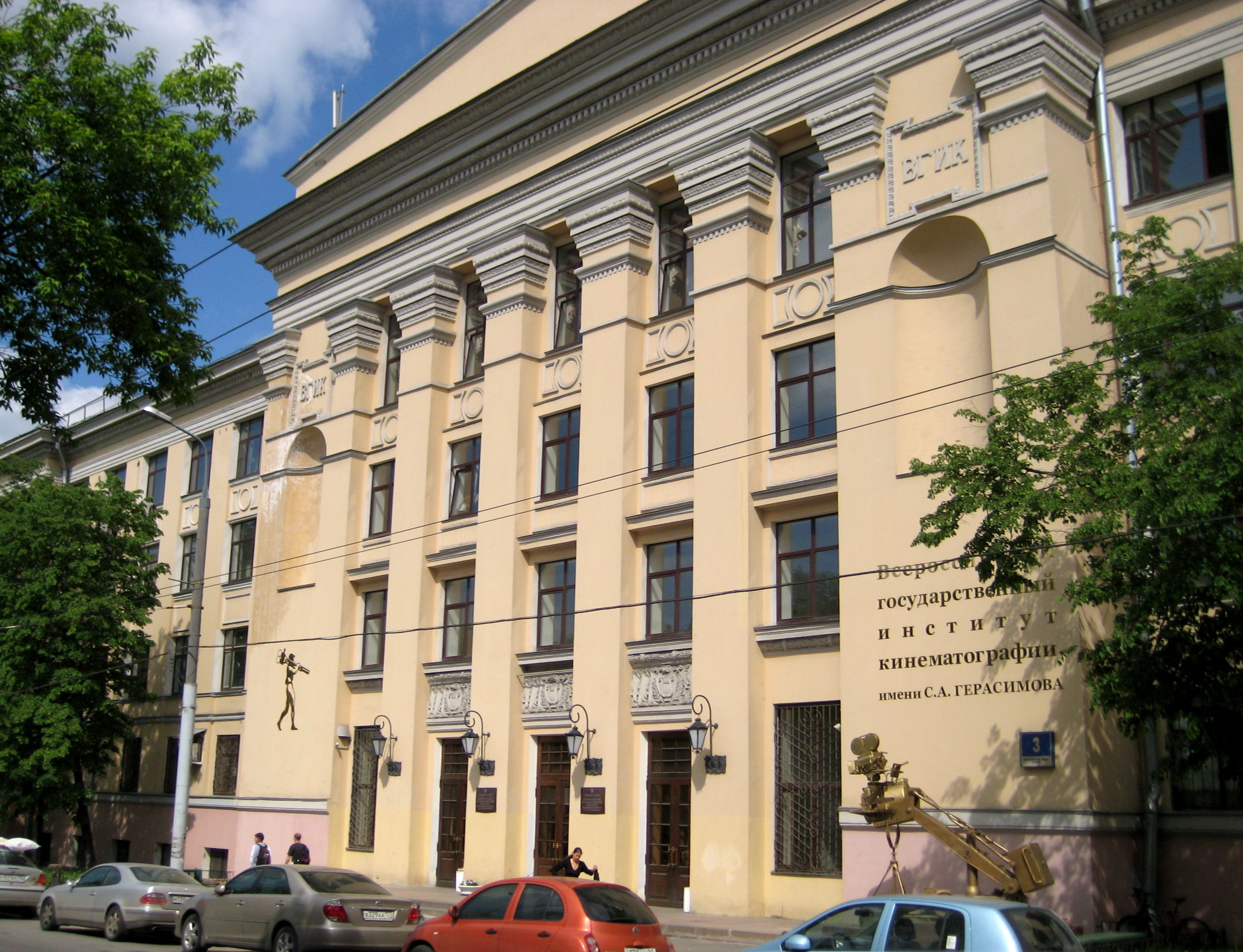
- Former names: All-Union State Institute of Cinematography; Всероссийский государственный институт кинематографии имени С. А. Герасимова
- Type: Film school
- Established: 1919 (by Vladimir Gardin)
- President: Alexander Novikov
- Rector: Vladimir Malyshev
- Faculty: c. 200
- Location: Moscow, Russian Federation, Russia
- Campus: Urban
- Website: vgik.info (in Russian language)

The Gerasimov Institute of Cinematography, officially the S. A. Gerasimov All-Russian University of Cinematography (Russian: Всероссийский государственный институт кинематографии имени С. А. Герасимова, romanized: Vserossiyskiy gosudarstvyennyy institut kinematografii imyeni S. A. Gerasimova), a.k.a. VGIK, is a film school in Moscow, Russia, widely regarded as the first and oldest film school in the world.

== History ==
Logo of VGIK.

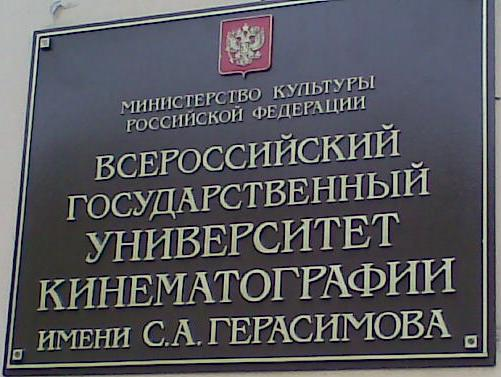
VGIK sign

The institute was founded in 1919 by the film director Vladimir Gardin as the Moscow Film School and is the first and oldest film school in the world. From 1934 to 1991 the film school was known as the All-Union State Institute of Cinematography (Russian: Всесоюзный государственный институт кинематографии).

Film directors taught at the institute include Lev Kuleshov, Marlen Khutsiev, Aleksey Batalov, Sergei Eisenstein, Mikhail Romm and Vsevolod Pudovkin.

Since 1986, the school has been named after the film director and actor Sergei Gerasimov.

The founding of the institute was authorized by Lenin in 1919. Its work in the early years was hampered by a shortage of film stock. It has a history as one of the oldest film schools in existence; many film directors have taught at the institute. During the period of the Soviet Union it was a requirement of the state to attend VGIK to be allowed to direct a film. More recently, its alumni were drawn both from the USSR (Soviet Union) and from other socialist and other countries, though it was a requirement for students to first learn Russian prior to attending. It is among the few film schools which offer scriptwriting courses.

== Notable alumni ==
Notable alumni include:

- Tengiz Abuladze
- Sitora Alieva
- Namsrayn Suvd
- Dhimitër Anagnosti
- Natalya Andrejchenko
- Anders Banke
- Siddiq Barmak
- Aimée Beekman
- Vladimir Beekman
- Sergei Bondarchuk
- Lucian Bratu
- Valentin Chernykh
- Sofiko Chiaureli
- Revaz Chkheidze
- Grigory Chukhray
- Yuri Chulyukin
- Souleymane Cissé
- Frank Daniel
- Georgi Djulgerov
- Maciej Drygas
- Dimitri Devyatkin
- Nikolai Ekk
- Natalya Fateyeva
- Yan Frid
- Aleksandr Fyodorov
- Evgeni Gabrielev
- Leonid Gaidai
- Aleksei Alekseivich German
- Marina Goldovskaya
- Anatoli Golovnya
- Stanislav Govorukhin
- Zheng Guo'en
- Lyudmila Gurchenko
- Iris Gusner
- Alexander Gutman
- Jerzy Hoffman
- Rustam Ibragimbekov
- Otar Iosseliani
- Viktor Ivanov
- Roman Karmen
- Shapi Kaziev
- Edmond Keosayan
- Ilya Khrzhanovsky
- Marlen Khutsiev
- Naum Kleiman
- Elem Klimov
- Andrei Konchalovsky
- Alim Kouliev
- Larisa Kronberg
- Lev Kulidzhanov
- Eldar Kuliev
- Tamila Koulieva-Karantinaki
- Savva Kulish
- Leida Laius
- Anton Lapenko
- Pavel Lebeshev
- Jay Leyda
- Roman Liberov
- Việt Linh
- Sergei Loznitsa
- Oleg Makara
- Mohammad Malas
- Vladimir Menshov
- Rachel Messerer
- Márta Mészáros
- Nikita Mikhalkov
- Aleksandr Misharin
- Alexander Mitta
- Kira Muratova
- Vladimir Nakhabtsev
- Rodion Nakhapetov
- Khodzha Kuli Narliyev
- Georgy Natanson
- Anna Nemzer
- Rufina Nifontova
- Mikko Niskanen
- Rashid Nugmanov
- Arsha Ovanesova
- Yuri Ozerov
- Sergei Parajanov
- Aleksandr Petrov
- Juris Podnieks
- Gennadi Poloka
- Galina Polskikh
- Ami Priyono
- Vsevolod Pudovkin
- Andres Puustusmaa
- Irma Raush
- Eduard Rozovsky
- Eldar Ryazanov
- Samson Samsonov
- Abderrahmane Sissako
- Mikhail Schweitzer
- Karen Shakhnazarov
- Giorgi Shengelaia
- Eldar Shengelaya
- Larisa Shepitko
- Vasily Shukshin
- Sjumandjaja
- Lyubov Sokolova
- Aleksandr Sokurov
- Elena Solovey
- Sergey Solovyov
- Sjumandjaja
- Andrei Tarkovsky
- Viktoriya Tokareva
- Alexei Uchitel
- Jonas Vaitkus
- Mikhail Vartanov
- Natalya Vavilova
- Luz Valdez
- Oleg Vidov
- Gheorghe Vodă
- Eduard Volodarsky
- Konrad Wolf
- Francheska Yarbusova
- Valentina Yermolova
- Vadim Yusov
- Vytautas Žalakevičius

== Faculty ==
An example of a short, silent film that was produced for a lighting class at the VGIK

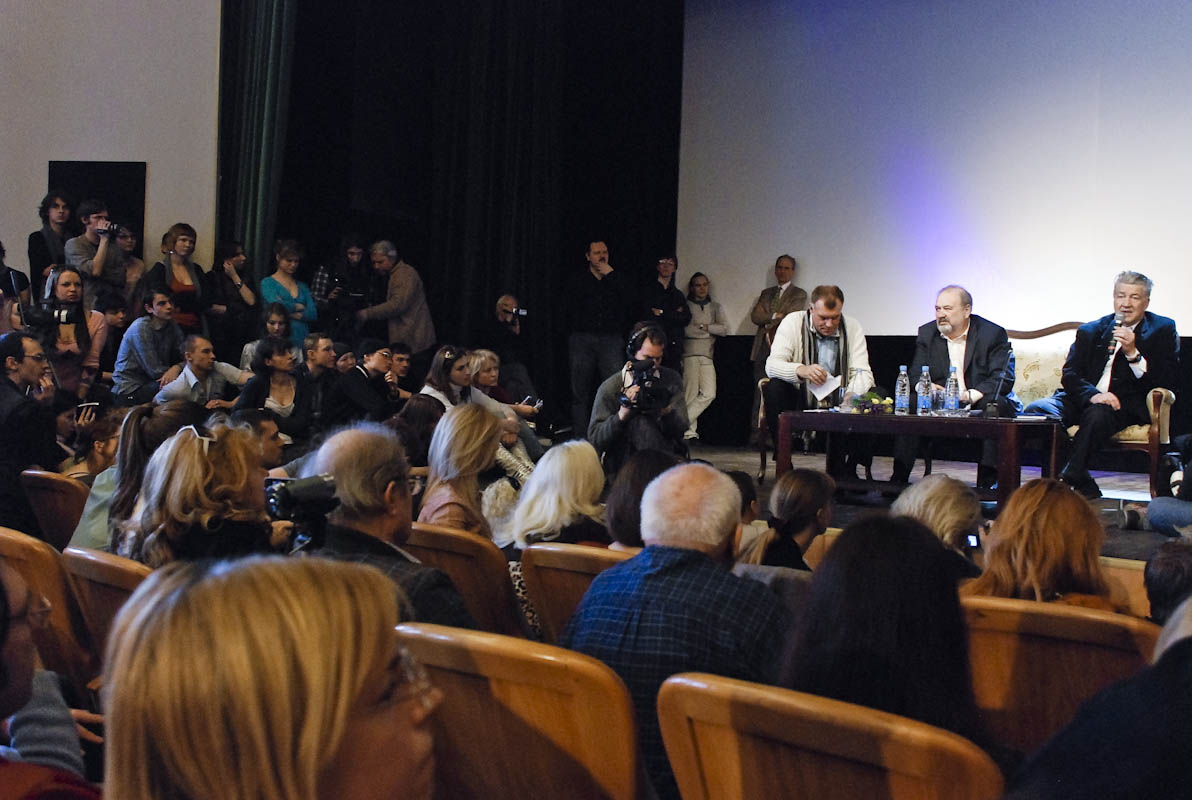
Filmmaker David Lynch speaking at the VGIK

In 2015–2016, the Institute featured the following faculties:

- Directing Faculty
- Acting Faculty
- Arts Faculty
- Filming Faculty
- Animation and Multimedia Faculty
- Scripting and Film Studies Faculty
- Production and Economics Faculty
- Inter-faculty departments and labs:
  - Department of History and Philosophy
  - Department of Cultural Theory, History and Esthetics
  - Laboratory of Film Drama
  - Laboratory of Painting and Drawing
  - Laboratory of Arts
  - Laboratory of International Film History
  - Laboratory of Classical and Stop-motion Animation
  - Laboratory of Computer Graphics and Multimedia
