= Zhanna Aguzarova =

Russian singer (born 1962)

Zhanna Aguzarova Жанна Агузарова
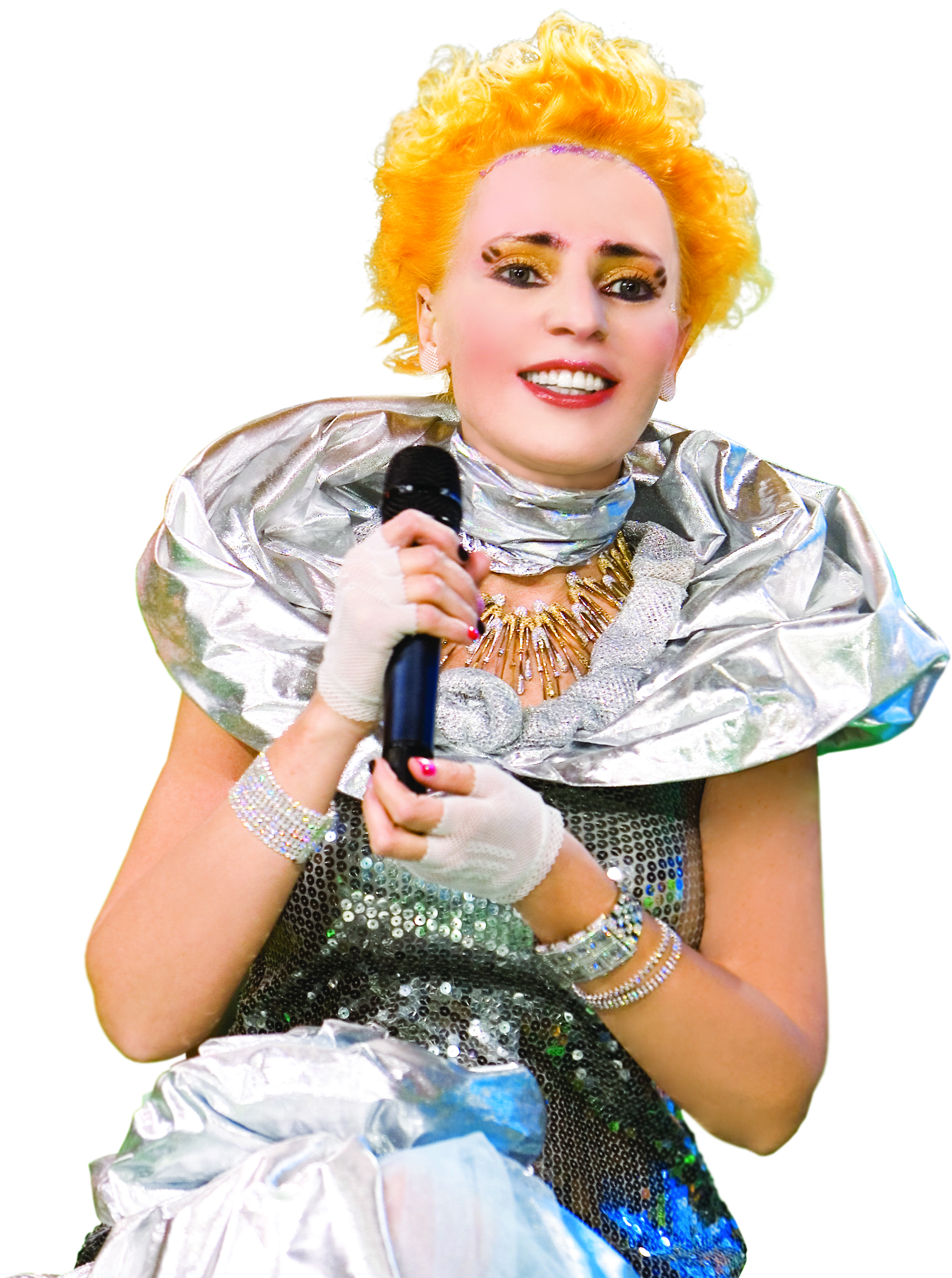

Background information
- Born: Zhanna Khasanovna Aguzarova; July 7, 1962 (age 64); Turtas, Tyumen Oblast, RSFSR, USSR
- Origin: Russian
- Genres: rock, pop rock, beat, glam rock, rockabilly
- Occupation: Singer
- Instruments: vocals
- Years active: 1983 — present

Zhanna Khasanovna Aguzarova (Russian: Жанна Хасановна Агузарова, Iron Ossetic: Ӕгъуызарты Хасаны чызг Жаннæ, romanized: Æghwyzarty Xasany ĉyzg Zhannæ; born July 7, 1962) is a Soviet and Russian singer, former vocalist of the group Bravo, who made a solo career.

Singer No. 3 of the Soviet Union after Sofia Rotaru and Alla Pugacheva in 1986–1988.

For an extremely eccentric, on the verge of kitsch, style of clothing, journalists call Aguzarova the "goddess of shocking" and compare her to Lady Gaga. In her few interviews, she often talks about her extraterrestrial origin and "internal connections" with the Martians.
