= Ghian Wright =

Ghian Wright, known under the pseudonym G, is an American music producer, mixer, songwriter, and multi-instrumentalist currently based in Los Angeles, California.

== Career ==
He has worked on projects for Paul McCartney, Oasis, Foo Fighters, Colbie Caillat, The Raconteurs, Coldplay, Janet Jackson, Nine Inch Nails, Bravo, Vampire Weekend, and for the movies Walk the Line and Across the Universe.

In 2010, he was nominated for a Grammy Award for best pop vocal album for engineering Colbie Caillat's second album, Breakththrough, and in 2014, nominated for engineering Nine Inch Nails' Hesitation Marks.

In 2018, he made a cover of "All by Myself" by Eric Carmen, that was renamed to "I'm All Alone (Belter Version)", and was used in the science fiction television series The Expanse, in the episode of season 3 "Delta-V". The lyrics of the song were rewritten in the mix of English and Belter Creole, a constructed language made for the TV series by Nick Farmer, that was used in the show by Belters, the inhabitants of the asteroid belt and outer planets. The lyrics were additionally adjusted to fit the in-universe setting The full version of the song was later placed on the Collector's Edition version of the TV series soundtrack, that was realized on December 13, 2019.

He is known for a unique mixing style, and productions that incorporate retro tones with modern-pop elements.

== Songs ==
- "I'm All Alone (Belter Version)" (cover)
