= Kasta =

Russian rap group

Каста
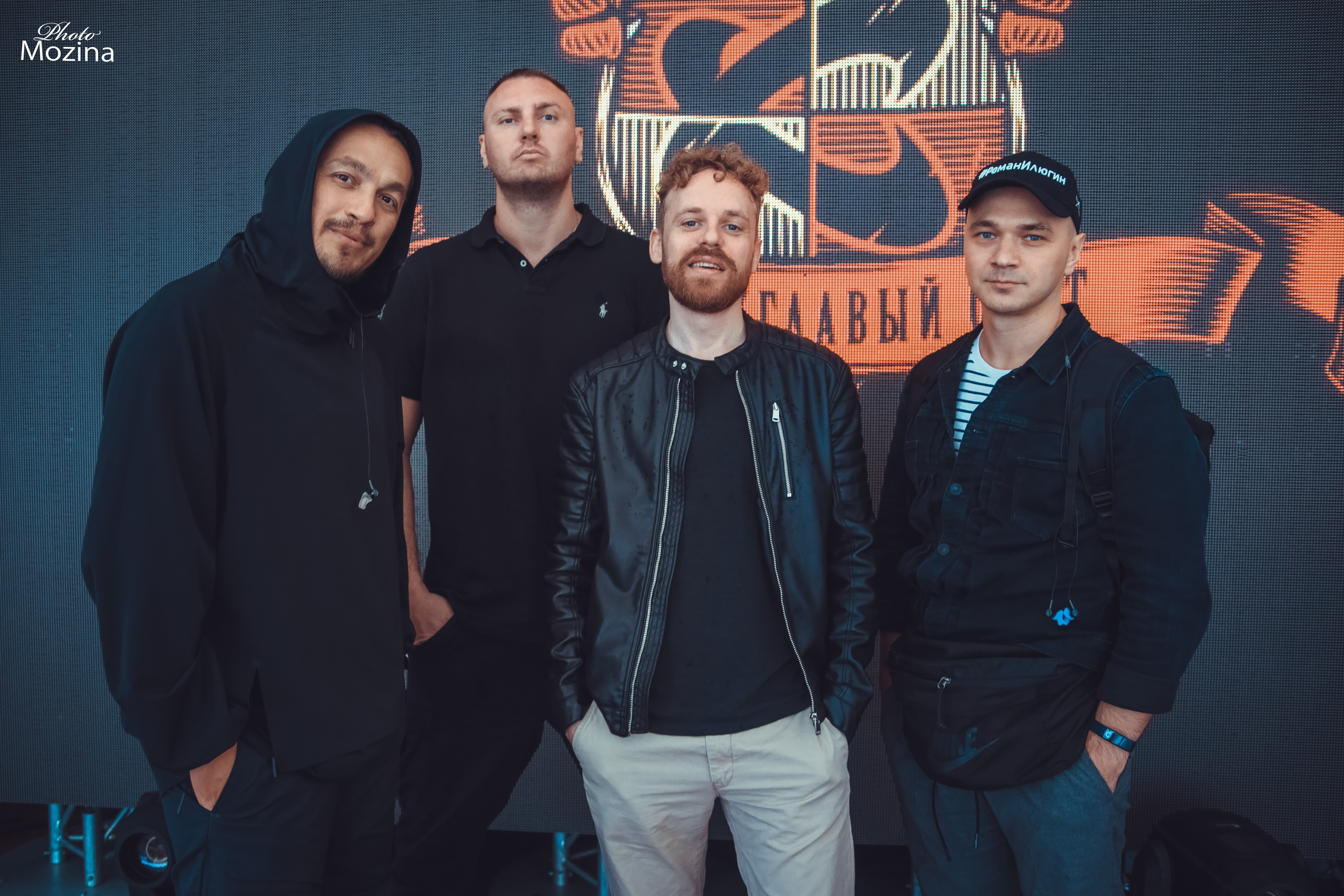
- Kasta in 2019

Background information
- Origin: Rostov-on-Don, Russia
- Genres: Hip hop
- Years active: 1999–present
- Members: Vlady (Влади); Shym (Шым); Hamil (Хамиль); Zmey (Змей)
- Website: kasta.world

Kasta (Russian: Каста) is a Russian rap group from Rostov-on-Don, formed on November 20, 1999 from three members of the group Psycholyric: Vlady, Shym and Hamil. In 2006, Zmey joined the group. The group works in the genre hip-hop. Vlady is responsible for the music, and everyone writes their own lyrics.

Kasta well-known to Russian-speaking audiences in post-Soviet countries. Kasta is a laureate and nominee of various music awards. Wu-Tang Clan had a huge influence on Kasta's early work, but over time, Kasta developed a unique southern style of Russian hip-hop. In the early 2000s, the group became famous for their hits "Мы берём это на улицах" (1999), "Наши люди" (1999), "На порядок выше" (2001), "Про Макса" (2002), "Ревность" (2002), "Горячее время" (2002), "Сестра" (2004), "Гончая" (2004), and in the late 2000s, "Вокруг шум" (2008), "Сочиняй мечты" (2012), "Прошёл через" (2020).

== History ==
All members of the group started listening to rap at a young age. In September 1995, Vlady (Влади) and his friend Tidan (Тидан) made a rap group Psycholyric (Russian: Психолирик). A year later, Shym (Шими, Шымон) joined them. In the summer of 1997, Tidan left the group. In the fall of 1997, Psycholyric with other rappers from Rostov-on-Don joined the rap association Kasta (Russian: Каста). Basta (Баста Хрю) suggested calling the association Fu-Blood-Casta (by analogy with Wu-Tang Clan and Fu-Schnickens), but Vlady considered this name to be unpleasant and suggested leaving only Kasta from it, and in the end everyone agreed on this. In the summer and fall of 1997, rappers performed at the Rostov club Duncan and from January 1998, at the club Comanchero. In the summer of 1999, Hamil (Хамиль) became the third member of Psycholyric. In November 1999, Psycholyric was renamed the group Kasta, and the rap association was renamed the United Kasta (Russian: Объединённая Каста). United Caste released two albums: Трёхмерные рифмы (1999) and В полном действии (2000). In June 2000, Arkady Slutskovsky became the group's producer, with whom Kasta founded the Moscow record label Respect Production in 2001. At the end of 2001, DJ Khobot was appointed the group's team DJ. Viktor Abramov (Bugs) was appointed PR manager.

In 2002, Kasta released their debut album, Громче воды, выше травы, which was included in the lists of "The main albums of Russian rap" (Rap.ru, 2007) and "10 most important albums of Russian rap" (Rap.ru, 2009). Since 2002, solo albums by the group's members have been released: the experimental "Что нам делать в Греции" (Vlady, 2002), the parable "Феникс" (Hamil, 2004). In 2006, the maxi-single "По приколу" was released, and Zmey (Змей) joined the main lineup of the group. In 2008, Kasta bought all of its albums and the Respect Production label from its producer, Arkady Slutskovsky. The group's new producer was Vlady, and the concert director was Ruslan Munnibaev. In 2008, the second album "Быль в глаза" was released, which took second place in the category "Best Album of 2008" according to the readers of Rap.ru. In 2010, Hamil and Zmey released the album "ХЗ". In January 2011, DJ Khobot left Kasta. Since 2012, Vlady has released solo albums: "Ясно!" (2012), "Несусветное" (2015), "Другое слово" (2019), "Длится февраль" (2022). In the second half of 2016, the group reunited for studio work and recorded several albums: "Четырёхглавый орёт" (2017), "Об изъяне понятно" (2019), "Чернила осьминога" (2020), "Альбомба" (2021), "Новинки зарубежного рэпа" (2024).

== Present ==
Kasta is still a major group in the Russian-speaking rap scene. The group is well-known in Russia, Ukraine, Belarus, Latvia, Lithuania, Estonia, Kazakhstan, Kyrgyzstan and in all countries of the former Soviet Union and countries where immigrants from these countries live. Six thousand people have been gathering for their concerts.

Kasta publicly condemned the Russian army's invasion of Ukraine on the very first day of the war and continues to express an anti-war stance. Kasta was included in the unofficial list of banned artists in Russia. The authorities have canceled all the band's concerts. The members of the group (Vlady, Shym, Hamil, Zmey) have emigrated from Russia and have been continuing to work abroad. In 2022, Vlady released his album "February Lasts," the first Russian-language album dedicated to the condemnation of the war. The album was marked by a large amount of press and attracted wide attention.

Kasta Concert in Munich on 8 February 2024

In 2024, Kasta released a full-fledged studio album called New Foreign Rap Releases, filled with deep emotion and protest against the Russian invasion, reflecting the group's new emigrant phase. Kasta is touring worldwide but not in Russia, where their new album is blocked by state censorship, and band member Vladi has been placed on the "foreign agents" list—used by the authorities to label artists and writers persecuted for their anti-war stance.

In 2024, Kasta participated in the Russian New Year's television show Mirnye Ogon'ki (Peaceful Lights), which was created as an alternative to similar shows on state-controlled and militarized Russian television.

== Members ==
- Vlady (Влади) – Leshkevich Vladislav, born December 17, 1978, in Rostov-on-Don
- Shym (Шым) – Epifanov Mikhail, born January 25, 1979, in Rostov-on-Don
- Hamil (Хамиль) – Pacechny Andrey, born October 19, 1979, in Rostov-on-Don
- Zmey (Змей) – Mishenin Anton, born January 21, 1982, Rostov-on-Don. In 2005, he left the group Grani after the release of the album Kipesh and joined Kasta.

== Discography ==
=== Albums ===
- 2002: Громче воды, выше травы (Louder than Water, Taller than Grass)
- 2002: Что нам делать в Греции? (What do we do in Greece?) [by Vlady]
- 2004: Феникс (Dank Kush) [by Hamil]
- 2006: По приколу (For fun)
- 2008: Быль в глаза (Facts to the Eyes)
- 2010: ХЗ (HZ) [by Hamil and Zmey]
- 2012: Ясно! (Clear!) [by Vlady]
- 2015: Несусветное (Light Bringing) [by Vlady]
- 2017: Четырёхглавый орёт (Four-Headed Eagle / Four-Headed Shouts)
- 2019: Другое слово (Another Word) [by Vlady]
- 2019: Об изъяне понятно (The Flaw Is Clear)
- 2020: Чернила осьминога (Octopus Ink)
- 2021: Альбомба (Albomba)
- 2022: Длится февраль (February Lasts) [by Vlady]
- 2024: Новинки зарубежного рэпа (New Foreign Rap Releases)

=== Albums of United Kasta (Объединённая Каста) ===
- 1997: Первый удар (First Strike) (compilation)
- 1999: Трёхмерные рифмы (3D Rhymes)
- 2000: В полном действии (In Full Force)
- 2003: Алкоголики (Alcoholics) [by Zmey and Grani]
- 2005: Кипеш (Bustle) [by Zmey and Grani]
- 2011: ЖаЗ дуэт (ZhaZ Duet) (EP) [by Jara and Zmey]

=== Singles ===
- 2001: "На порядок выше" ("Vastly Beyond")
- 2002: "Горячее время" ("Hot Time") [by Vlady]

== Music videos ==
- "Мы берём это на улицах" ("We Got It from the Streets") (2000)
- "На порядок выше" ("Level above") (2001)
- "Про Макса" ("About Max") (2002)
- "Горячее время ("Hot time") (OST Антикиллер (Antikiller)) (2002)
- "Ревность" ("Jealousy") (Влади (Vlady)) (2003)
- "Наши люди" ("Our People") (Live at Наши Люди '03) (2003)
- "Сестра" ("Sister") (2005)
- "Черви ненависти" ("Worms of Hate") (Хамиль (Khamil) feat. Песочные Люди (Sand Men)) (2005)
- "Капсулы скорости" ("Speed Capsules") (2006)
- "Глупо, но класс" ("Stupid, but Cool") (Vlady feat. Gustavo) (2007)
- "Встреча" ("Meeting") (2008)
- "Радиосигналы" ("Radio Signals") (Vlady) (2008)
- "Вокруг шум" ("Noise Around Us") (2009)
- "Номерок" ("The Tab") (Vlady feat. Крестная Семья (Godmother's family)) (2009)
- "Можно всё" ("Everything's Allowed") (Vlady feat. Animal Jazz) (2009)
- "Встретимся у холодильника" ("Meet Me by the Fridge") (Khamil, Iskra & DJ Hobot) (2009)
- "Закрытый космос" ("Closed Space") (Khamil) (2010)
- "Метла" ("The Broom") (Khamil & Zmey) (2011)
- "Самый счастливый человек на Земле" ("The Happiest Man of the Earth") (Zmey) (2011)
- "Миллиард лет" ("Billion Years") (2011)
- "Это прёт" ("It Hauls Hard") (Khamil & Zmey) (2011)
- "Такое чувство" ("Such a Feeling") (Khamil & Zmey) (2011)
- "Сочиняй мечты" ("Make Dreams") (Vlady feat. Уля (Ulya) (Wow Band)) (2012)
- "Пусть пригодится" ("Let Be Useful") (Vlady) (2012)
- "Тебе в прикол" ("Good for You") (2012)
- "Прощание" ("Farewell") (Vlady) (2012)
- "Скрепы" (2017)
- "На том конце" (2018)
- "Сто-игра" (2018)
- "Прошел через" (2020)
- "Колокола над кальянной" (2020)
- "Выходи гулять" (2020)
- "Врун" (2021)
- "Под солнцем затусим" (2021)
- "Этого больше не будет" (2025)

== Awards ==
- Grand Prix "Rap Music 99"
- Russian Music Awards 2004 MTV – Best hip-hop, rap project
- Muz-TV Awards 2006 – Best hip-hop, rap project
- RAMP 2009 – Urbana
- Russian Street Awards 2010 – Best Acoustic ("Noise Around Us")
- "Legend of MTV" 2010 – A decisive influence on the formation and development of modern musical culture in Russia
