= Obe Dve =

Russian band

- Origin: Ekaterinburg, Russia
- Genres: Pop music, Pop rock
- Years active: 2006-present
- Members: Катя Павлова, Дима Емельянов, Антон Шохирев, Ксюша Васильева
- Website: obedve.ru

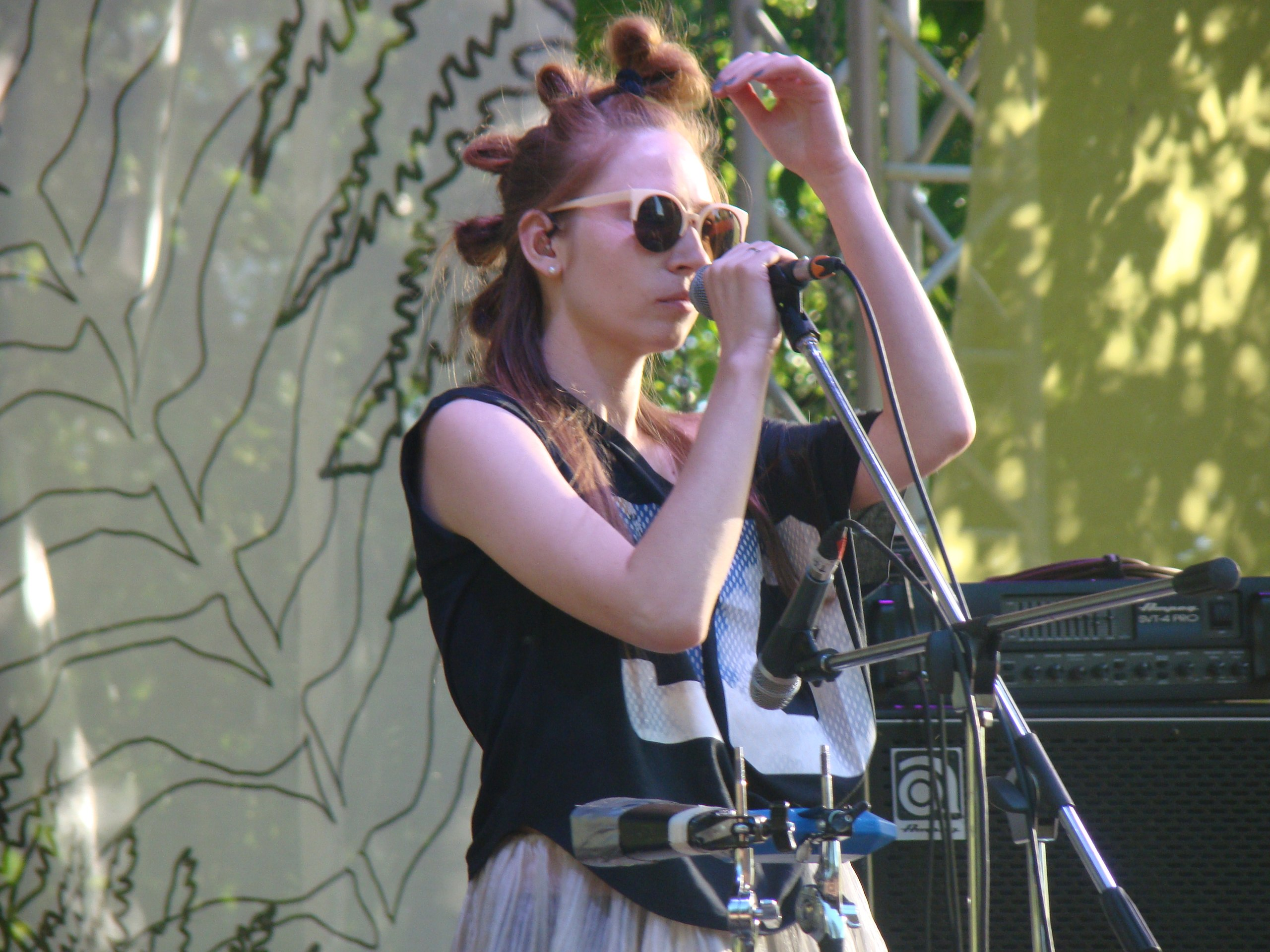
Обе две. Павлова

Obe Dve (Russian: Обе Две) is a Russian band from Ekaterinburg, fronted by Ekaterina Pavlova. They have released four albums "Znaesh shto ya delala" (2011), "Doch ribaka" (2015), ЕР "Mal'chik" (2017) and EP "Mal'chik (Acoustic)" (2017).

== Beginnings ==
The group began in 2006, with a collaboration between Ekaterina and her sister Tatiana. The band is currently located in Moscow, Russia.
