= Ashot Satyan =

Armenian composer and conductor

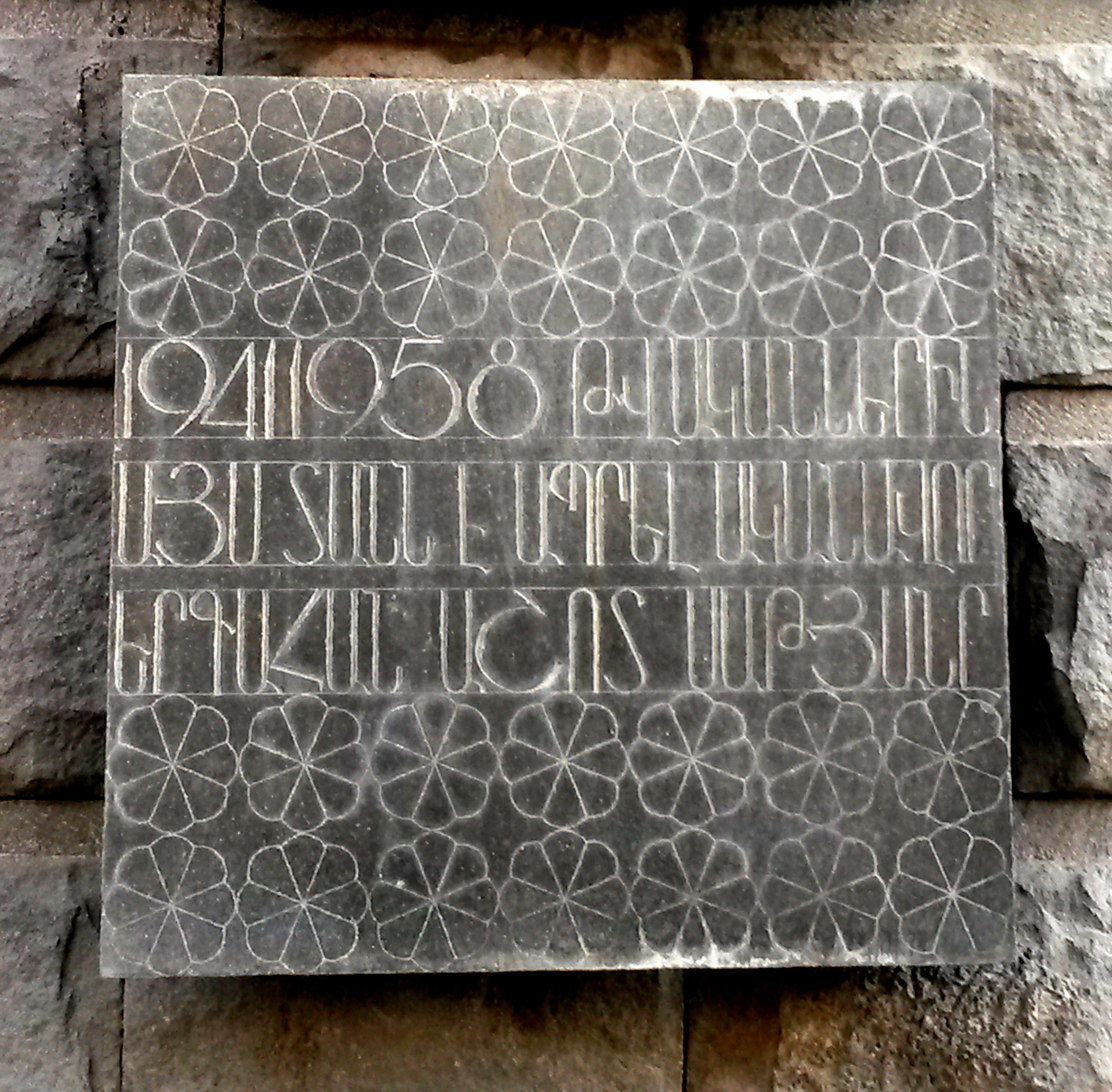
Ashot Satyan's plaque on Mashtots Avenue, Yerevan

Ashot Movsesovich Satyan (Armenian: Աշոտ Մովսեսի Սաթյան; 18 January 1906 – 30 September 1958) was an Armenian and Soviet composer and conductor.

From 1948–1952 he was the head of Armenian SSR Composers' Union. His "Songs of Ararat Valley" were awarded with Stalin Prize in 1952.

== Filmography ==
Year	Title	Original title	Director
1943	David Bek	Russian: ДАВИД БЕК	Hamo Beknazarian
1954	The Secret of Mountain Lake	Russian: ТАЙНА ГОРНОГО ОЗЕРА	Alexander Rou
