= List of things named after Vladimir Arnold =

A list of things named after Vladimir Arnold, a Russian and Soviet mathematician.

- Arnold complexity in dynamical systems theory
- Arnold conjecture
- Arnold diffusion
- Arnold invariants
- Arnold tongue
- Arnold web in dynamical systems theory
- Arnold's cat map
- Arnold's rouble problem
- Arnold's spectral sequence
- Arnold's stability theorems in analysis of PDEs
- Arnold's strange duality in algebraic geometry
- Arnold–Beltrami–Childress flow
- Arnold–Givental conjecture
- Arnold's notation
- Euler–Arnold equation
- Hilbert–Arnold problem
- Kolmogorov–Arnold representation theorem
- Kolmogorov–Arnold–Moser theorem
- Liouville–Arnold theorem

== Other ==
- The 10031 Vladarnolda, minor planet.
- The Arnold Mathematical Journal, published for the first time in 2015, is named after him.
- The Arnold's Problems book is named after him.
- Kolmogorov–Arnold Networks
- Arnold–Kuiper–Massey theorem
- Arnold chord conjecture
- Arnold's trinities
