= Alexander Pechen =

Russian physicist and mathematician (born 1979)

- Born: 26 January 1979 (age 47); Moscow, USSR
- Education: Moscow State Univ.
- Awards: Blavatnik Award (2009)
- Scientific career
- Fields: Mathematical physics, quantum theory
- Institutions: Steklov Institute; MISiS University; Princeton University; Weizmann Institute
- Doctoral advisor: Igor Volovich

External image
- Alexander Pechen (photo)

Alexander Nikolayevich Pechen (Russian: Александр Николаевич Печень, born 26 January 1979 in Moscow) is a Russian physicist and mathematician. In 2009 he became a laureate of the Blavatnik Award for Young Scientists (USA), in 2016 was elected to Professor of the Russian Academy of Sciences among about 500 top Russian researchers aged under fifty.

== Professional career ==
Pechen studied physics at the Faculty of Physics of Moscow State University, specializing in theoretical physics and graduating with honors in 2001. He received his PhD (Cand. Sci.) in 2004 and Doktor nauk degree in 2014. Pechen is known for the research in quantum mechanics, quantum control, statistical mechanics, open quantum systems and mathematical physics.

From 2000 to 2003, Pechen stayed as a visiting researcher at the University of Rome Tor Vergata. From 2005 to 2010 he was with Chemistry Department of Princeton University. It is the work at Princeton that brought him the Blavatnik award; the work has discovered that it is possible to develop a single, unified mathematical treatment for a wide range of open system control phenomena. The control of open quantum systems is highly important for applications since real controlled atoms and molecules almost always significantly interact with their environment.

From 2011 to 2013, as a Marie Curie Incoming International Fellowship recipient (ACOLA project), he was working at the Department of Chemical Physics in Weitzmann Institute in Israel. His work was concentrated on the analysis of quantum control landscapes and, jointly with D.J. Tannor drawing a distinction between kinematic and dynamic critical points he demonstrated the existence of trapping behaviour for quantum control systems.

His present affiliations are with the Steklov Institute of Mathematics (from 2016 to 2019, he headed the Laboratory of Mathematical Methods for Quantum Technologies there, which in 2019 grew up in the Department of Mathematical Methods for Quantum Technologies under his leadership) and National University of Science and Technology MISiS, both located in Moscow. In 2013–2016, he served as Academic Secretary of the Steklov Institute. He is also a member of the Academic Councils of Steklov Institute and MISiS.

Since 2014, Pechen is a member of the Coordination Council of the Federal Fundamental Scientific Research Programme for 2013–2020 in Russia. In 2014–2018 he acted as coordinator of the research project «Contemporary Mathematics and its applications» (about 120 participants) in Stekov Institute sponsored by the Russian Science Foundation.

Since 2015, he also serves as Academic Secretary of the National Committee of Mathematicians of Russia. He was a member, jointly with Arkady Dvorkovich, Sergey Kislyakov, Andrei Okounkov, Stanislav Smirnov, and Victor Vassiliev, of the Russian delegation on the General Assembly of the International Mathematical Union 2018 in São Paulo, Brazil. The delegation presented a bid to have the International Congress of Mathematicians 2022 in Saint Petersburg. The bid was supported by the Assembly. Now Alexander Pechen is a member of the Organizing Committee of the International Congress of Mathematicians 2022 in Saint Petersburg.

== Representative publications ==
- K. A. Lyakhov, H. J. Lee, A. N. Pechen, Some issues of industrial scale boron isotopes separation by the laser assisted retarded condensation (SILARC) method, Sep. Purif. Technol., 176:4 (2017), 402–411.
- A. N. Pechen, D. J. Tannor, Are there traps in quantum control landscapes?, Phys. Rev. Lett., 106 (2011), 120402.
- A. Pechen, H. Rabitz, Teaching the environment to control quantum systems, Phys. Rev. A, 73 (2006), 062102.
- A. Pechen, N. Il'in, F. Shuang, H. Rabitz, Quantum control by von Neumann measurements, Phys. Rev. A, 74 (2006), 052102.
