= Vladimir Zakalyukin =

Russian mathematician

Vladimir Mikhailovich Zakalyukin
- Born: 9 July 1951; Moscow, Soviet Union
- Died: 30 December 2011 (aged 60); Moscow, Russia
- Education: Moscow State University
- Scientific career
- Fields: Mathematics
- Workplaces: Moscow State University; University of Liverpool; Moscow Aviation Institute
- Doctoral advisor: Vladimir Arnold

Vladimir Mikhailovich Zakalyukin (in Russian: Владимир Михайлович Закалюкин; 9 July 1951 – 30 December 2011) was a Russian mathematician known for his research on singularity theory, differential equations, and optimal control theory.

He obtained his Ph.D. at Moscow State University in 1977 (the thesis: "Lagrangian and Legendrian singularities"). His thesis advisor was Vladimir Arnold. In 2007 he won the MAIK Nauka award for best research publication in Russian. He worked at the Moscow State University, the University of Liverpool, and the Moscow Aviation Institute.

== Selected publications ==
- V. M. Zakalyukin, "Lagrangian and Legendrian singularities", Functional Analysis and Its Applications, 1976.
- V. M. Zakalyukin, "Reconstructions of fronts and caustics depending on a parameter and versality of mappings", Journal of Soviet Mathematics, 1984.
- V. M. Zakalyukin, "Singularities of Circle-Surface Contacts and Flags", Functional Analysis and Its Applications, 1997.
- V. V. Goryunov, V. M. Zakalyukin, "Simple symmetric matrix singularities and the subgroups of Weyl groups Aμ, Dμ, Eμ", Mosc. Math. J., 3:2 (2003).
- J.-P. Gauthier, V. M. Zakalyukin, "On the motion planning problem, complexity, entropy, and nonholonomic interpolation", J. Dyn. Control Syst., 12:3 (2006).
