= Victor Goryunov =

Russian mathematician

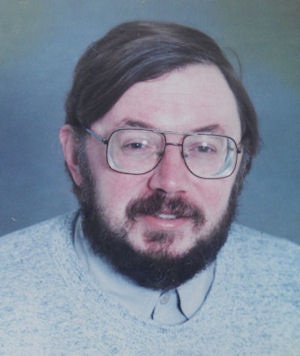
- Born: 1956 (age 69–70); Moscow, Soviet Union
- Education: Moscow State University
- Known for: Singularity theory
- Scientific career
- Fields: Mathematics
- Workplaces: University of Liverpool
- Thesis: Surface projection singularities (1981)
- Doctoral advisor: Vladimir Arnold
- Website: www.liverpool.ac.uk/people/victor-goryunov

Victor Vladimirovich Goryunov is a Russian mathematician born in 1956. He is a leading figure in singularity theory, whose contributions to the subject are fundamental. He has published several books and a variety of papers in singularity theory, finite type invariants, and Legendrian knots. Many of his papers in Lagrangian and Legendrian geometry are now considered to be classical in the subject.

Goryunov completed his Ph.D. thesis, titled "Surface projection singularities", at Moscow's Lomonosov State University in 1981, under the direction of Vladimir Arnold. He is currently a Professor of Mathematics at the University of Liverpool. He was an editorial advisor of the journal Proceedings of the London Mathematical Society.

== Publications ==
He is the co-author of two published books.

- Arnold, V. I.; Goryunov, V. V.; Lyashko, O. V.; Vassiliev, V. A. (1993), Dynamical Systems VI: Singularity Theory I, Local and global theory, Springer, ISBN 3-540-50583-0
- Arnold, V. I.; Goryunov, V. V.; Lyashko, O. V.; Vassiliev, V. A. (1993), Dynamical Systems VIII: Singularity Theory II, Classification and Applications, Springer, ISBN 3-540-53376-1

Since 1978, he has published more than 50 peer reviewed articles. A list of recent publications and preprints, together with PDF files, can be found here; a list of earlier publications can be found here.
