= Boris Shapiro =

Russian-Swedish mathematician

Boris Z. Shapiro (born 1957, Moscow, Soviet Union) is a Russian-Swedish mathematician, whose research concerns differential equations, commutative algebra and Schubert calculus. The Shapiro–Shapiro conjecture (or simply the Shapiro conjecture) was named after Michael Shapiro and him (it is now the well-known Mukhin–Tarasov–Varchenko theorem).

Shapiro enrolled in the PhD program at Moscow State University, Soviet Union in 1985 as a student of Vladimir Arnold, but his thesis defense was rejected by the examining committee. He then defended the same thesis at Stockholm University, Sweden in 1990, and was awarded his PhD. He became the most prolific PhD student of Arnold, in terms of academic descendance. He has been a professor at Stockholm University since 1993.

== Selected papers ==
- A. Postnikov, B. Shapiro, "Trees, parking functions, syzygies, and deformations of monomial ideals", Transactions of the American Mathematical Society 356 (8), pp. 3109–3142.
- B. Shapiro, M. Shapiro, A. Vainshtein, "Ramified Coverings of S² With One Degenerate Branching Point And Enumeration of Edge-Ordered Graphs", Proceedings of the 8th International Conference on Formal Power Series and Algebraic Combinatorics, 1996, pp. 421–426.
- B. Shapiro, J. Borcea, P. Brändén, "Pólya-Schur master theorems for circular domains and their boundaries", Annals of Mathematics, pp. 465–492 from Volume 170 (2009).

== See also ==
- Tree-like curve
