= Napkin folding problem =

Origami that exceeds its starting perimeter

The napkin folding problem is a problem in geometry and the mathematics of paper folding that explores whether folding a square or a rectangular napkin can increase its perimeter. The problem is known under several names, including the Margulis napkin problem, suggesting it is due to Grigory Margulis, and Arnold's ruble problem referring to Vladimir Arnold and the folding of a Soviet ruble bank note. It is the first problem listed by Arnold in his book Arnold's Problems, where he calls it the rumpled dollar problem.

Arnold's formulation of the problem was ambiguous, perhaps intentionally, and its solution depends on the types of folds that are allowed. For one restriction of the problem to simple folds made one at a time, the answer is no: no perimeter-increasing fold is possible. For other related restrictions, the answer to the question remains unknown. However, for flat-folded states of an arbitrary crease pattern, without consideration of how the state is reached, or for folding using the restrictions of rigid origami, it is indeed possible to increase the perimeter.

== Formulations ==
Although Arnold originally formulated his problem for the rectangular shape of a Soviet ruble, later treatment often consider the square shape of origami paper instead. Following this convention, the napkin can be modeled mathematically as a unit square, with perimeter 4. There are several ways to define the notion of folding, giving different interpretations.

=== Folding along a straight line ===
One version of the napkin folding problem allows only a sequence of simple folds, in which all of the layers of the napkin on one side of a line are reflected across the line. For these folds, each step decreases the perimeter. The newly added perimeter along one or more segments of the fold line is more than balanced by a decrease in perimeter along the boundary of the region of the plane covered by both parts of the folded shape, which connects the endpoints of the same line segments. Thus, for folds of this type, the perimeter never exceeds its starting value, 4.

A more general class of foldings allows the reflection across a line of only a single layer of the napkin (a connected component of folded napkin on one side of a straight line), leaving the other components in place. It is still open whether a sequence of these foldings can increase the perimeter. In other words, it is still unknown whether there exists a solution that can be folded using some combination of mountain folds, valley folds, reverse folds, and/or sink folds (with all folds in the latter two cases being formed along a single line).

Also unknown is whether a perimeter-increasing fold would be possible using the more-restrictive pureland origami, in which a sequence of mountain and valley folds are made one crease at a time. The argument showing that simple folds decrease the perimeter does not apply to this case: although the first fold decreases the perimeter, subsequent folds can increase it again.

=== Where only the result matters ===
One can ask whether there exists a folded planar napkin with greater perimeter than the original, without regard as to how it was folded into that shape. Its shape must be non-convex, because every convex polygon that can be folded from the original square has smaller perimeter than the square.

Robert J. Lang showed in 1997 that several classical origami constructions give rise to an easy solution. In fact, Lang showed that the perimeter can be made as large as desired by making the construction more complicated, while still resulting in a flat folded solution.

In 1998, Ivan Yaschenko constructed a solution that solves a different variant of the problem. Yaschenko's solution is a three-dimensional folding, whose projection onto a plane produces a polygon with a bigger perimeter than the original square. However, Yaschenko was unable to prove that this method leads to a perimeter-increasing folding that does not stretch the paper.

The projection from 3d to 2d, seen in Yaschenko's solution, is a short map, a mapping from the original origami square to the plane that is allowed to stretch or distort the paper by decreasing distances, but never by increasing distances. Svetlana Krat constructed in 2005 a different and simpler short map that increases the perimeter, and proved that any short map can be arbitrarily well approximated by folding. Thus, both her and Yaschenko's short maps can be converted to perimeter-increasing flat foldings. Her construction also works for an arbitrary rectangle.

=== Folding without stretching ===
Rigid origami provides a more constrained version of the problem than the pure existence of a flat-folded state. In rigid origami, what is required is a continuous folding motion throughout which the uncreased panels of origami paper remain flat, without bending or stretching. In 2004, A. Tarasov showed that it is indeed possible to reach a flat-folded state with greater perimeter than the original square, through a sequence of rigid origami motions. This can be considered a complete solution to the original problem.

== Solutions ==
=== Bird base ===
Lang's bird base solution. Left: The bird base with one of its four shoulders thinned by sinking. Right: The completed model.

Lang devised two different solutions to the version of the problem where only the final flat-folded state matters. Both involved sinking flaps and so were not necessarily rigidly foldable. The simplest was based on the origami bird base. It thins each side of the bird base to a quarter of its original width, by sinking each of the four shoulders of the base along lines parallel to the center line of the base. Then, it folds two of the four long flaps of the base outward, at right angles to the long direction of the thinned base, squashing some of the previously-sunk folds near the top of the base and leaving a narrow gap between the other two bottom flaps. This results in a solution with a perimeter of about 4.12 compared to the original perimeter of 4. Petrunin depicts a variant of this solution for which the flaps are thinned in a different pattern.

=== Sea urchin ===
Crease pattern for Lang's sea urchin-like solution with n = 5

Lang's second solution can be used to make a figure with a perimeter as large as desired. He divides the square into a large number of smaller squares and employs the "sea urchin" type origami construction described in his 1990 book Origami Sea Life. The crease pattern shown is the n = 5 case and can be used to produce a flat figure with 25 flaps, one for each of the large circles, and sinking is used to thin them. The general construction produces n^{2} arms that give a 25-pointed star with a small center and a perimeter approaching n^{2}/(n − 1). In the case of n = 5 this is about 6.25, and more generally the total perimeter goes up in approximate proportion to n.

=== Tarasov's comb ===
Tarasov's rigid origami solution, once folded, has a base in the form of a long thin near-isosceles triangle, placed horizontally, from which a linear sequence of similarly-shaped triangular spikes point upwards. The resulting shape resembles a comb. The folding pattern used to produce this comb is complicated, but it begins with a subdivision of the initial square into 4n^{2} smaller squares, from which are produced 2n^{2} spikes, each of length approximately one quarter the side of the smaller squares. Like Lang's pattern, the result is a total perimeter that grows in approximate proportion to n.

=== Waterbomb short map ===
A short map from a square to a tree of greater perimeter. Each red circle or blue circular arc in the square is mapped to its thick centerline at the point where it crosses the centerline; these centerlines become the branches of the tree. The yellow regions of the square are all mapped to a single point where the branches meet.

The short map that Krat constructs is very simple: for a square, it uses a waterbomb base to bring the perimeter of the square into an X-shaped tree, with the same perimeter, and maps the interior parts of the square near its corners onto this tree. This leaves a central region within which there is enough material to form a fifth branch of the tree, emanating from its central point, which brings the total perimeter up to $3+\sqrt2\approx 4.414.$

== History ==
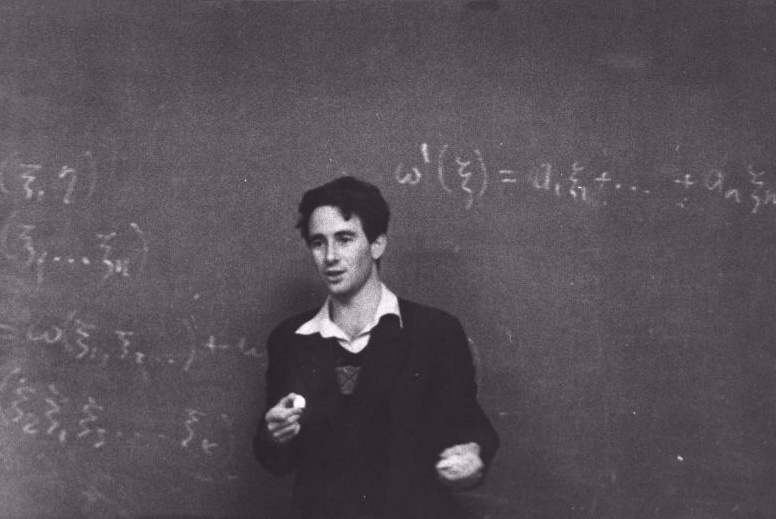
Vladimir Arnold as a young mathematician, in 1963

In the book Arnold's Problems, Vladimir Arnold dates the problem to 1956, and recalls that he originally posed it to Roland Dobrushin when he was an undergraduate and Dobrushin was a graduate student. He called it the "rumpled ruble problem" (or, in the English edition of the book, the "rumpled dollar problem"), and it was the first of many interesting problems he set at seminars in Moscow over 40 years. In the West, it became known as the Margulis napkin problem after the name used in Jim Propp's newsgroup posting in 1996. Propp did not specify whether this name referred to Russian mathematician Grigory Margulis, and later messages in the discussion thread clarified that he was unaware "whether it is indeed due to Margulis". Despite attention, it received mathematical folklore status and its origin is often referred as "unknown".

In a review of Arnold's Problems, Sergei Tabachnikov writes that "It is interesting that the problem was solved by origami practitioners way before it was posed (at least, in 1797, in the Japanese origami book Senbazuru Orikata)". This book, also called A Thousand Cranes and How to Fold Them, describes the bird base from which Robert Lang's first solution to the napkin folding problem was derived, but the origami crane and its bird base can be dated back earlier still, to 1591. Another work from 1845, Kayaragusa, includes several sea creatures with many long thin legs, including a crab and octopus, prefiguring Lang's sea urchin folding pattern and his use of that pattern to solve the napkin folding problem.
