= Quaternionic projective space =

Concept in mathematics

In mathematics, quaternionic projective space is an extension of the ideas of real projective space and complex projective space, to the case where coordinates lie in the ring of quaternions $\mathbb{H}.$ Quaternionic projective space of dimension n is usually denoted by

$$\mathbb{HP}^n$$

and is a closed manifold of (real) dimension 4n. It is a homogeneous space for a Lie group action, in more than one way. The quaternionic projective line $\mathbb{HP}^1$ is homeomorphic to the 4-sphere.

== In coordinates ==
Its direct construction is as a special case of the projective space over a division algebra. The homogeneous coordinates of a point can be written

$$[q_0,q_1,\ldots,q_n]$$

where the $q_i$ are quaternions, not all zero. Two sets of coordinates represent the same point if they are 'proportional' by a left multiplication by a non-zero quaternion c; that is, we identify all the

$$[cq_0,cq_1\ldots,cq_n]$$.

In the language of group actions, $\mathbb{HP}^n$ is the orbit space of $\mathbb{H}^{n+1}\setminus\{(0,\ldots,0)\}$ by the action of $\mathbb{H}^{\times}$, the multiplicative group of non-zero quaternions. By first projecting onto the unit sphere inside $\mathbb{H}^{n+1}$ one may also regard $\mathbb{HP}^{n}$ as the orbit space of $S^{4n+3}$ by the action of $\text{Sp}(1)$, the group of unit quaternions. The sphere $S^{4n+3}$ then becomes a principal Sp(1)-bundle over $\mathbb{HP}^n$:

$$\mathrm{Sp}(1) \to S^{4n+3} \to \mathbb{HP}^n.$$

This bundle is sometimes called a (generalized) Hopf fibration.

There is also a construction of $\mathbb{HP}^{n}$ by means of two-dimensional complex subspaces of $\mathbb{H}^{2n}$, meaning that $\mathbb{HP}^{n}$ lies inside a complex Grassmannian.

== Topology ==
=== Homotopy theory ===
The space $\mathbb{HP}^{\infty}$, defined as the union of all finite $\mathbb{HP}^n$'s under inclusion, is the classifying space BS^{3}. The homotopy groups of $\mathbb{HP}^{\infty}$ are given by $\pi_i(\mathbb{HP}^{\infty}) = \pi_i(BS^3) \cong \pi_{i-1}(S^3).$ These groups are known to be very complex and in particular they are non-zero for infinitely many values of $i$. However, we do have that

$$\pi_i(\mathbb{HP}^\infty) \otimes \Q \cong \begin{cases} \Q & i = 4 \\ 0 & i \neq 4 \end{cases}$$

It follows that rationally, i.e. after localisation of a space, $\mathbb{HP}^\infty$ is an Eilenberg–Maclane space $K(\Q,4)$. That is $\mathbb{HP}^{\infty}_{\Q} \simeq K(\Z, 4)_{\Q}.$ (cf. the example K(Z,2)). See rational homotopy theory.

In general, $\mathbb{HP}^n$ has a cell structure with one cell in each dimension which is a multiple of 4, up to $4n$. Accordingly, its cohomology ring is $\Z[v]/v^{n+1}$, where $v$ is a 4-dimensional generator. This is analogous to complex projective space. It also follows from rational homotopy theory that $\mathbb{HP}^n$ has infinite homotopy groups only in dimensions 4 and $4n+3$.

== Differential geometry ==
$\mathbb{HP}^n$ carries a natural Riemannian metric analogous to the Fubini-Study metric on $\mathbb{CP}^n$, with respect to which it is a compact quaternion-Kähler symmetric space with positive curvature.

Quaternionic projective space can be represented as the coset space

$$\mathbb{HP}^n = \operatorname{Sp}(n+1)/\operatorname{Sp}(n)\times\operatorname{Sp}(1)$$

where $\operatorname{Sp}(n)$ is the compact symplectic group.

=== Characteristic classes ===
Since $\mathbb{HP}^1=S^4$, its tangent bundle is stably trivial. The tangent bundles of the rest have nontrivial Stiefel–Whitney and Pontryagin classes. The total classes are given by the following formulas:

$$w(\mathbb{HP}^n) = (1+u)^{n+1}$$
$$p(\mathbb{HP}^n) = (1+v)^{2n+2} (1+4v)^{-1}$$

where $v$ is the generator of $H^4(\mathbb{HP}^n;\Z)$ and $u$ is its reduction mod 2.

== Special cases ==
=== Quaternionic projective line ===
The one-dimensional projective space over $\mathbb{H}$ is called the "projective line" in generalization of the complex projective line. For example, it was used (implicitly) in 1947 by P. G. Gormley to extend the Möbius group to the quaternion context with linear fractional transformations. For the linear fractional transformations of an associative ring with 1, see projective line over a ring and the homography group GL(2,A).

From the topological point of view the quaternionic projective line is the 4-sphere, and in fact these are diffeomorphic manifolds. The fibration mentioned previously is from the 7-sphere, and is an example of a Hopf fibration.

Explicit expressions for coordinates for the 4-sphere can be found in the article on the Fubini–Study metric.

=== Quaternionic projective plane ===
The 8-dimensional $\mathbb{HP}^{2}$ has a circle action, by the group of complex scalars of absolute value 1 acting on the other side (so on the right, as the convention for the action of c above is on the left). Therefore, the quotient manifold

$$\mathbb{HP}^{2}/\mathrm{U}(1)$$

may be taken, writing U(1) for the circle group. It has been shown that this quotient is the 7-sphere, a result of Vladimir Arnold from 1996, later rediscovered by Edward Witten and Michael Atiyah. It is called quaternionic Arnold–Kuiper–Massey theorem.
