= Emil Horozov =

Bulgarian mathematician (1949–2026)

Emil Horozov (27 September 1949 – 13 January 2026, in Sofia) was a Bulgarian mathematician known for his work in dynamical systems theory and mathematical physics and work related to Hilbert's sixteenth problem.

== Education ==
Horozov obtained Master's degree from Sofia University in 1972 and then got his Ph.D. from Moscow State University in 1978, where he was under the supervision of V. I. Arnold and Y. V. Egorov. His thesis was Bifurcations of symmetric vectorfields on the plane. In 1990, Horozov obtained his D.Sc. degree, this time from Sofia University, after completing his thesis, which was titled Hamiltonian systems and Abelian integrals.

== Career ==
Horozov was an assistant professor at Sofia University for ten years before accepting associate professor position in 1984. He was promoted to professor ten years later, and served as such at the same institution until 2002, when he decided to become senior researcher at the Institute of Mathematics and Computer Science. He retained his professorship in 2006 and since that year relocated to University of California, Santa Barbara.

During his years as professor, Horozov was also a visiting professor to Vrije Universiteit Amsterdam from June 1985 to October 1986, as well as to Brandeis University in 1986, 1987, and 1998 respectively. He also was visiting professor to the University of Arizona from August 1991 to May 1992 and to the University of Bremen in June 1991 and February 1993. In May 1997, Horozov became a visiting professor at the University of Florence and then served as such at Artois University in July 1999, the University of Nantes in January 2000, and at the University of Leeds in April 2001.

== Works ==
Among his best known mathematical works are "Versal deformations of equivariant vector fields for cases of symmetry of order two and three" (Ph.D. thesis, 1979), "On the number of limit cycles in perturbations of quadratic Hamiltonian systems" (joint with I. D. Iliev), "Some functions that generalize the Krall-Laguerre polynomials" (joint with F. A Grünbaum and L. Haine), and "Perturbations of the spherical pendulum and Abelian integrals".

== Corruption allegations ==
He was the head of the Bulgarian National Science Fund until his resignation in February 2011 after suffering reprisals for combating corruption in the institution. In 2014 Sofia University decided to retire prematurely Professor Emil Horozov contrary to the rules and the practice of the University. In this relation an open Letter addressed to the Rector Ivan Ilchev and the Members of the Academic Council of Sofia University “St. Kliment Ohridski’’ was published in the Newsletter of the European Mathematical Society. The letter has not received an official answer. Later the first instance Bulgarian court has decided that the act of Sofia University violates the law and that Professor Horozov must be returned to his job.
