= Weakly contractible space =

Topological space consisting of trivial homotopy groups

In mathematics, a topological space is said to be weakly contractible if all of its homotopy groups are trivial. Equivalently, a space is weakly contractible if it is weakly homotopy equivalent to a point.

== Properties ==
Every contractible space is weakly contractible; conversely, it follows from Whitehead's theorem that every weakly contractible CW-complex is contractible. For general topological spaces only the former implication holds.

Every weakly contractible space is in particular path-connected, simply connected and aspherical.

== Examples ==
Define $S^\infty$ to be the inductive limit of the spheres $S^n, n\ge 1$. Then this space is weakly contractible. Since $S^\infty$ is moreover a CW-complex, it is also contractible. See Contractibility of unit sphere in Hilbert space for more.

The long line is an example of a space which is weakly contractible, but not contractible. This does not contradict Whitehead's theorem since the long line does not have the homotopy type of a CW-complex. Another prominent example for this phenomenon is the Warsaw circle.
