= Arnold's spectral sequence =

In mathematics, Arnold's spectral sequence (also spelled Arnol'd) is a spectral sequence used in singularity theory and normal form theory as an efficient computational tool for reducing a function to canonical form near critical points. It was introduced by Vladimir Arnold in 1975.

== Definition ==
It is a spectral sequence for the filtered de Rham complex with

- The filtration coming from increasing order of poles along discriminant loci (Diagonals)
- E1-page has differential forms that have logarithmic singularities along the diagonals
- The differential encodes the relationships among the singular forms
