= Ordinary Differential Equations (textbook) =

1973 textbook by Vladimir Arnold

- Author: Vladimir Arnold
- Translator: Richard A. Silverman
- Language: English
- Subject: Differential equations
- Published: MIT Press
- Publication date: 1973
- Media type: Book

Ordinary Differential Equations, published by MIT Press in 1973, is a textbook by mathematician Vladimir Arnold. It was translated from the Russian by Richard A. Silverman. It's an introductory course for graduate students or strong undergraduate students. The focus is on applications to mechanics. Some opinions of reviewers: Chicone praised the book, while Sacker mentioned that many results are given without proof. As put by the magazine American Scientist: "[...] textbook treats the subject of ordinary differential equations in an entirely new way [...]. One can expect this book to bring new life into this old subject."
