= Kuiper's theorem =

Result on the topology of operators on an infinite-dimensional, complex Hilbert space

In mathematics, Kuiper's theorem (after Nicolaas Kuiper) is a result on the topology of operators on an infinite-dimensional, complex Hilbert space H. It states that the space GL(H) of invertible bounded endomorphisms of H is such that all maps from any finite complex Y to GL(H) are homotopic to a constant, for the norm topology on operators.

A significant corollary, also referred to as Kuiper's theorem, is that this group is weakly contractible, ie. all its homotopy groups are trivial. This result has important uses in topological K-theory.

== General topology of the general linear group ==
For finite dimensional H, this group would be a complex general linear group and not at all contractible. In fact it is homotopy equivalent to its maximal compact subgroup, the unitary group U of H. The proof that the complex general linear group and unitary group have the same homotopy type is by the Gram-Schmidt process, or through the matrix polar decomposition, and carries over to the infinite-dimensional case of separable Hilbert space, basically because the space of upper triangular matrices is contractible as can be seen quite explicitly. The underlying phenomenon is that passing to infinitely many dimensions causes much of the topological complexity of the unitary groups to vanish; but see the section on Bott's unitary group, where the passage to infinity is more constrained, and the resulting group has non-trivial homotopy groups.

== Historical context and topology of spheres ==
It is a surprising fact that the unit sphere, sometimes denoted S^{∞}, in infinite-dimensional Hilbert space H is a contractible space, while no finite-dimensional spheres are contractible. This result, certainly known decades before Kuiper's, may have the status of mathematical folklore, but it is quite often cited. In fact more is true: S^{∞} is diffeomorphic to H, which is certainly contractible by its convexity. One consequence is that there are smooth counterexamples to an extension of the Brouwer fixed-point theorem to the unit ball in H. The existence of such counter-examples that are homeomorphisms was shown in 1943 by Shizuo Kakutani, who may have first written down a proof of the contractibility of the unit sphere. But the result was anyway essentially known (in 1935 Andrey Nikolayevich Tychonoff showed that the unit sphere was a retract of the unit ball).

The result on the group of bounded operators was proved by the Dutch mathematician Nicolaas Kuiper, for the case of a separable Hilbert space; the restriction of separability was later lifted. The same result, but for the strong operator topology rather than the norm topology, was published in 1963 by Jacques Dixmier and Adrien Douady. The geometric relationship of the sphere and group of operators is that the unit sphere is a homogeneous space for the unitary group U. The stabiliser of a single vector v of the unit sphere is the unitary group of the orthogonal complement of v; therefore the homotopy long exact sequence predicts that all the homotopy groups of the unit sphere will be trivial. This shows the close topological relationship, but is not in itself quite enough, since the inclusion of a point will be a weak homotopy equivalence only, and that implies contractibility directly only for a CW complex. In a paper published two years after Kuiper's,

== Bott's unitary group ==
There is another infinite-dimensional unitary group, of major significance in homotopy theory, that to which the Bott periodicity theorem applies. It is certainly not contractible. The difference from Kuiper's group can be explained: Bott's group is the subgroup in which a given operator acts non-trivially only on a subspace spanned by the first N of a fixed orthonormal basis {e_{i}}, for some N, being the identity on the remaining basis vectors.

== Applications ==
An immediate consequence, given the general theory of fibre bundles, is that every Hilbert bundle is a trivial bundle.

The result on the contractibility of S^{∞} gives a geometric construction of classifying spaces for certain groups that act freely on it, such as the cyclic group with two elements and the circle group. The unitary group U in Bott's sense has a classifying space BU for complex vector bundles (see Classifying space for U(n)). A deeper application coming from Kuiper's theorem is the proof of the Atiyah–Jänich theorem (after Klaus Jänich and Michael Atiyah), stating that the space of Fredholm operators on H, with the norm topology, represents the functor K(.) of topological (complex) K-theory, in the sense of homotopy theory. This is given by Atiyah.

== Case of Banach spaces ==
The same question may be posed about invertible operators on any Banach space of infinite dimension. Here there are only partial results. Some classical sequence spaces have the same property, namely that the group of invertible operators is contractible. On the other hand, there are examples known where it fails to be a connected space. Where all homotopy groups are known to be trivial, the contractibility in some cases may remain unknown.
