= Tree-like curve =

Type of planar curve with tree-like structure

A tree-like curve with finitely many marked double points

In mathematics, particularly in differential geometry, a tree-like curve is a generic immersion $c: S^1 \to \mathbb{R}^2$ with the property that removing any double point splits the curve into exactly two disjoint connected components. This property gives these curves a tree-like structure, hence their name. They were first systematically studied by Russian mathematicians Boris Shapiro and Vladimir Arnold in the 1990s.

For generic curves interpreted as the shadows of knots (that is, knot diagrams from which the over-under relations at each crossing have been erased), the tree-like curves can only be shadows of the unknot. As knot diagrams, these represent connected sums of figure-eight curves. Each figure-eight is unknotted and their connected sum remains unknotted. Random curves with few crossings are likely to be tree-like, and therefore random knot diagrams with few crossings are likely to be unknotted.

== See also ==
- Arnold invariants
- Gauss diagram
- Inflection point
