= Nicolaas Kuiper =

Dutch mathematician (1920–1994)

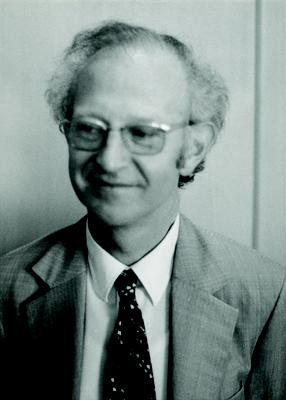
- Born: 28 June 1920; Rotterdam, Netherlands
- Died: 12 December 1994 (aged 74); Heteren, Netherlands
- Education: University of Leiden
- Known for: Kuiper's test Kuiper's theorem Arnold–Kuiper–Massey theorem
- Scientific career
- Fields: Mathematics
- Workplaces: University of Amsterdam; Institut des Hautes Études Scientifiques
- Doctoral advisor: Willem van der Woude
- Doctoral students: Eduard Looijenga; Floris Takens

Nicolaas Hendrik Kuiper (Dutch pronunciation: [ˈkœypər]; 28 June 1920 – 12 December 1994) was a Dutch mathematician, known for Kuiper's test and proving Kuiper's theorem. He also contributed to the Nash embedding theorem.

Kuiper studied at University of Leiden in 1937-41, and worked as a secondary school teacher of mathematics in Dordrecht in 1942-47. He completed his Ph.D. in differential geometry from the University of Leiden in 1946 under the supervision of Willem van der Woude. In 1947 he came to the United States at the invitation of Oscar Veblen, where he stayed at the Institute for Advanced Study for one year as Veblen's assistant, and the second year as member of the IAS, meeting Shiing-Shen Chern, and he also went to the University of Michigan at Ann Arbor. In February to June 1954, he went for a second time to Ann Arbor where he met Raoul Bott and his student Stephen Smale. In 1950 he was appointed professor of mathematics (and statistics) at the Agricultural University of Wageningen.

In 1957, he was notably one of the six participants to the first Arbeitstagung, an informal seminar animated by Friedrich Hirzebruch, which later became very popular among mathematicians; he saw at this occasion Alexander Grothendieck presenting his first revolutionary works in algebraic geometry. In 1960 he visited Northwestern University in Evanston for half a year.

He became professor of pure mathematics at the University of Amsterdam in 1962. In 1969-70 he made a second visit at the Institute for Advanced Study. At his return from Princeton, he gave a talk at the International Congress of Mathematicians organised in Nice, during which he was appointed in the executive committee of the International Mathematical Union for 1971–1975. He finally served as director of the Institut des Hautes Études Scientifiques from 1971 until his retirement in 1985, then stayed there as a long-term visitor for six years. In 1990, he was appointed chairman of the program committee of the International Congress of Mathematicians held at Kyoto. In 1991, he returned to the Netherlands to live in Heteren, and continued to participate in mathematical colloquia at the University of Utrecht.

== See also ==
- Eells–Kuiper manifold
