= Alexander Varchenko =

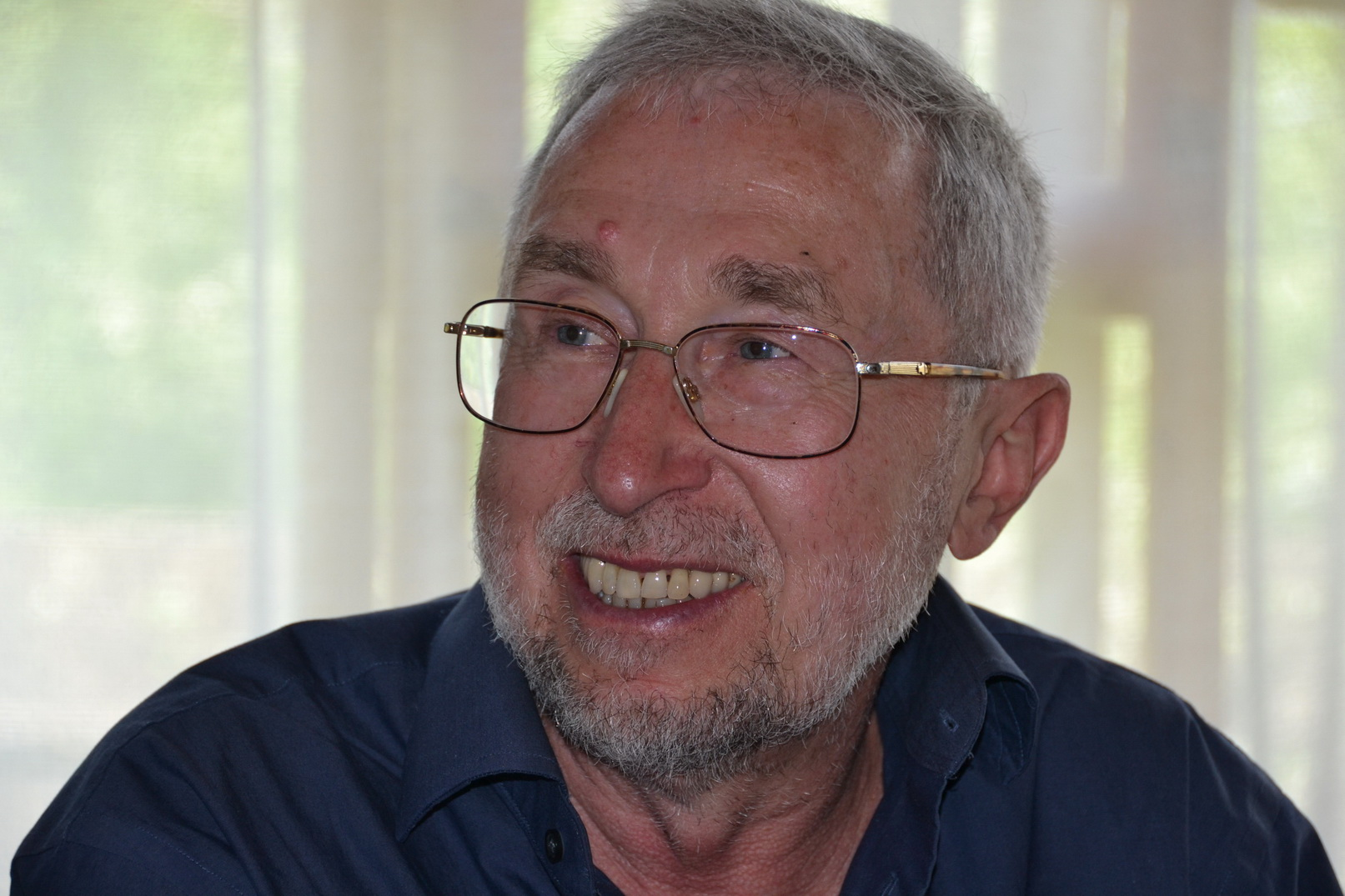
- Born: February 6, 1949 (age 77); Russia
- Education: Moscow State University (1971)
- Scientific career
- Fields: Mathematics
- Workplaces: University of North Carolina at Chapel Hill
- Doctoral advisor: Vladimir Arnold

Alexander Nikolaevich Varchenko (Russian: Александр Николаевич Варченко, born February 6, 1949) is a Soviet and Russian mathematician working in geometry, topology, combinatorics and mathematical physics.

== Education and career ==
From 1964 to 1966 Varchenko studied at the Moscow Kolmogorov boarding school No. 18 for gifted high school students, where Andrey Kolmogorov and Ya. A. Smorodinsky were lecturing mathematics and physics. Varchenko graduated from Moscow State University in 1971. He was a student of Vladimir Arnold. Varchenko defended his Ph.D. thesis Theorems on Topological Equisingularity of Families of Algebraic Sets and Maps in 1974 and Doctor of Science thesis Asymptotics of Integrals and Algebro-Geometric Invariants of Critical Points of Functions in 1982. From 1974 to 1984 he was a research scientist at the Moscow State University, in 1985–1990 a professor at the Gubkin Institute of Gas and Oil, and since 1991 he has been the Ernest Eliel Professor at the University of North Carolina at Chapel Hill.

== Recognition ==
Varchenko was an invited speaker at the International Congress of Mathematicians in 1974 in Vancouver (section of algebraic geometry) and in 1990 in Kyoto (a plenary address). In 1973 he received the Moscow Mathematical Society Award.

He was named to the 2023 class of Fellows of the American Mathematical Society, "for contributions to singularity theory, real algebraic geometry, and the theory of quantum integrable systems".

He is a Simons Fellow.

== Books ==
- Arnolʹd, V. I.; Guseĭn-Zade, S. M.; Varchenko, A. N. Singularities of differentiable maps. Vol. I. The classification of critical points, caustics and wave fronts. Monographs in Mathematics, 82. Birkhäuser Boston, Inc., Boston, MA, 1985. xi+382 pp. ISBN 0-8176-3187-9
- Arnolʹd, V. I.; Guseĭn-Zade, S. M.; Varchenko, A. N. Singularities of differentiable maps. Vol. II. Monodromy and asymptotics of integrals. Monographs in Mathematics, 83. Birkhäuser Boston, Inc., Boston, MA, 1988. viii+492 pp. ISBN 0-8176-3185-2
- Etingof, P.; Varchenko, A. Why the Boundary of a Round Drop Becomes a Curve of Order Four (University Lecture Series), AMS 1992, ISBN 0821870025
- Varchenko, A. Multidimensional hypergeometric functions and representation theory of Lie algebras and quantum groups. Advanced Series in Mathematical Physics, 21. World Scientific Publishing Co., Inc., River Edge, NJ, 1995. x+371 pp. ISBN 981-02-1880-X
- Varchenko, A. Special functions, KZ type equations, and representation theory. CBMS Regional Conference Series in Mathematics, 98. Published for the Conference Board of the Mathematical Sciences, Washington, DC; by the American Mathematical Society, Providence, RI, 2003. viii+118 pp. ISBN 0-8218-2867-3
