= Dmitry Fuchs =

Russian-American mathematician (born 1939)

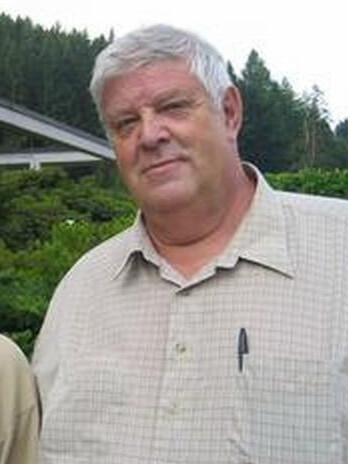
Fuchs at Oberwolfach, 2006

Dmitry Borisovich Fuchs (Russian: Дмитрий Борисович Фукс, romanized: Dmitry Borisovich Fuks, born 30 September 1939) is a Soviet and American mathematician, specializing in the representation theory of infinite-dimensional Lie groups and in topology. He was born in Kazan, Soviet Tatarstan.

== Education and career ==
Fuchs received in 1964 his Russian candidate degree (Ph.D.) under Albert S. Schwarz at Moscow State University, where he taught thereafter. Schwarz conducted a seminar on algebraic topology with Mikhail Postnikov and Vladimir Boltyansky. Fuchs participated in the seminar and, as a student, published papers with Schwarz, as did Askold Ivanovich Vinogradov a few years earlier. Fuchs received his Russian doctorate (higher doctoral degree) in 1987 at Tbilisi State University. Since 1991 he has been a professor at the University of California, Davis.

With Israel Gelfand he introduced in 1970 the Gelfand-Fuchs cohomology of Lie algebras. Gelfand-Fuchs cohomology has applications in the proof of the Macdonald identities in combinatorics and in the calculation of characteristic classes of foliations. With Boris Feigin he determined the structure of Verma modules in the Virasoro algebra representation theory, which has applications in string theory and conformal field theory.

His students include Boris Feigin (with whom he has collaborated extensively), Fedor Malikov, Sergei Tabachnikov, and Vladimir Rokhlin, as well as Edward Frenkel for whom Fuchs was a second advisor. Frenkel, among many others, was affected by the Soviet antisemitism which flourished from 1954 to 1970 (described by Fuchs) and on into the 1980s.

In 1978 Fuchs was an Invited Speaker with talk New results on the characteristic classes of foliations at the International Congress of Mathematicians in Helsinki.

== Personal life ==
Fuchs's father was also a mathematician, and a student of Stefan Bergman. His daughter Elena Fuchs is also a professor in the mathematics department at UC Davis, and his daughter Ekaterina Fuchs is a professor in the mathematics department at the City College of San Francisco.

== Selected publications ==
- with Anatoli T. Fomenko, Viktor L. Gutenmacher: Homotopic topology. Akadémiai Kiadó, Budapest 1986, ISBN 963-05-3544-0. Fomenko, Anatoly; Fuchs, Dmitry (2016). Homotopical topology, 2nd edition. ISBN 9783319234885.
- Cohomology of infinite-dimensional Lie algebras. Consultants Bureau, New York NY 1986, ISBN 0-306-10990-5.
- Singular vectors over the Virasoro Algebra and extended Verma Modules. In: Dmitry Fuchs (ed.): Unconventional Lie Algebras (= Advances in Soviet Mathematics. vol. 17). American Mathematical Society, Providence RI 1993, ISBN 0-8218-4121-1, pp. 65–74.
- with Serge Tabachnikov: Mathematical omnibus. Thirty lectures on classic mathematics. American Mathematical Society, Providence RI 2007, ISBN 978-0-8218-4316-1

== Sources ==
- Alexander Astashkevich, Serge Tabachnikov (eds.): Differential topology, infinite-dimensional Lie algebras, and applications. D. B. Fuchs' 60th Anniversary Collection (= American Mathematical Society. Translations. Series 2, 194). American Mathematical Society, Providence RI 1999, ISBN 0-8218-2032-X.
