= Nearby Lagrangian conjecture =

Mathematical proposal

Unsolved problem in mathematics
Prove or disprove: Any closed exact Lagrangian submanifold of the cotangent bundle of a closed manifold is Hamiltonian isotopic to the zero section.
Reported as unsolved in a source published in 2024.
More unsolved problems in mathematics

In mathematics, more specifically symplectic topology, the nearby Lagrangian conjecture is an open mathematical problem often attributed to Vladimir Arnold. It states that every closed exact Lagrangian submanifold of a cotangent bundle T∗M (with symplectic structure) is Hamiltonian isotopic to the zero section.

It is closely related to the theory of generating functions.

== Possible counterexample in unrestricted case ==
In September 2026, OpenAI claimed to have disproved the unrestricted nearby Lagrangian conjecture. The counterexample takes a sufficiently large even integer $N$, and constructs a closed exact smoothly embedded Lagrangian in $T^{*}(S^{9} \times S^{N-1})$ that is diffeomorphic to the base, but is not Hamiltonian isotopic to the zero section. The work still needs to be independently verified.

== See also ==
- OpenAI bulk release of mathematical papers
