= Boris Khesin =

Russian-Canadian mathematician

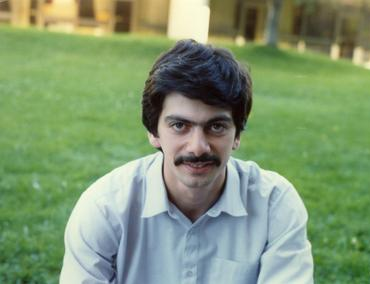
Boris Khesin, Berkeley 1990

Boris Aronovich Khesin (in Russian: Борис Аронович Хесин, born in 1964) is a Russian and Canadian mathematician working on infinite-dimensional Lie groups, Poisson geometry and hydrodynamics. He has held positions at the University of California, Berkeley, Yale University, and currently is a professor at the University of Toronto.

Khesin obtained his Ph.D. from Moscow State University in 1990 under the supervision of Vladimir Arnold (Thesis: Normal forms and versal deformations of evolution differential equations).

From 1990 to 1992 he was Morrey Assistant Professor at the University of California at Berkeley and from 1992 to 1996 assistant professor at Yale University. In 1997/98 and in 2012 he worked at the Institute for Advanced Study. In 1996 he became associate professor and in 2002 professor at the University of Toronto.

He is an editor of the Complete Works of Vladimir Arnold.

His wife, Maria Khesin, is a computer scientist also at the University of Toronto.

== Honors and awards ==
In 1997 he was awarded the Aisenstadt Prize. "Professor Khesin is recognized for his work in Poisson geometry and infinite-dimensional group theory, and for his remarkable geometric intuition applied to problems of topological hydrodynamics and double-loop groups. He has also done fundamental work in bifurcation theory. He has proven R. Thom's rule, called the rule of "seven elementary catastrophes", in dynamical systems. In addition, Professor Khesin coauthored with Olga Kravchenko the discovery of the "logarithm of the derivative", a notion of elegant simplicity providing a link between the theory of determinants and the theory of infinite-dimensional integrable systems."

From 1997 to 2001 he was a recipient of the Sloan Research Fellowship.

== Books ==
- with Vladimir Arnold: Topological methods in hydrodynamics. Springer Verlag, 1998
- with Robert Wendt: The geometry of infinite dimensional groups. Springer Verlag,
