= Kolmogorov–Arnold Networks =

Type of artificial neural network architecture

Kolmogorov–Arnold Networks (KANs) are a type of artificial neural network architecture inspired by the Kolmogorov–Arnold representation theorem, also known as the superposition theorem. Unlike traditional multilayer perceptrons (MLPs), which rely on fixed activation functions and linear weights, KANs replace each weight with a learnable univariate function, often represented using splines.

== History ==
KANs (Kolmogorov–Arnold Networks) were proposed by Liu et al. (2024) as a generalization of the Kolmogorov–Arnold representation theorem (KART), aiming to outperform MLPs in small-scale AI and scientific tasks. Before KANs, numerous studies explored KART's connections to neural networks or used it as a basis for designing new network architectures.

In the 1980s and 1990s, early research applied KART to neural network design. Kůrková et al. (1992), Hecht-Nielsen (1987), and Nees (1994) established theoretical foundations for multilayer networks based on KART. Igelnik et al. (2003) introduced the Kolmogorov Spline Network using cubic splines to model complex functions. Sprecher (1996, 1997) introduced numerical methods for building network layers, while Nakamura et al. (1993) created activation functions with guaranteed approximation accuracy. These works linked KART's theoretical potential with practical neural network implementation.

KART has also been used in other computational and theoretical fields. Coppejans (2004) developed nonparametric regression estimators using B-splines, Bryant (2008) applied it to high-dimensional image tasks, Liu (2015) investigated theoretical applications in optimal transport and image encryption, and more recently, Polar and Poluektov (2021) used Urysohn operators for efficient KART construction, while Fakhoury et al. (2022) introduced ExSpliNet, integrating KART with probabilistic trees and multivariate B-splines for improved function approximation.

== Architecture ==
KANs are based on the Kolmogorov–Arnold representation theorem, which was linked to the 13th Hilbert problem.

Given $x = (x_1, x_2, \dots, x_n)$ consisting of n variables, a multivariate continuous function $f(x)$ can be represented as:

$f(x) = f(x_1, \dots, x_n) = \sum_{q=1}^{2n+1} \Phi_q \left( \sum_{p=1}^{n} \varphi_{q,p}(x_p) \right)$ (1)

This formulation contains two nested summations: an outer and an inner sum. The outer sum $\sum_{q=1}^{2n+1}$ aggregates $2n+1$ terms, each involving a function $\Phi_q : \mathbb{R} \to \mathbb{R}$. The inner sum $\sum_{p=1}^n$ computes n terms for each q, where each term $\varphi_{q,p} : [0,1] \to \mathbb{R}$ is a continuous function of the single variable $x_p$. The inner continuous functions $\varphi_{q,p}$ are universal, independent of $f$, while the outer functions $\Phi_q$ depend on the specific function $f$ being represented. The representation (1) holds for all multivariate functions $f$ as proved in. If $f$ is continuous, then the outer functions $\Phi_q$ are continuous; if $f$ is discontinuous, then the corresponding $\Phi_q$ are generally discontinuous, while the inner functions $\varphi_{q,p}$ remain the same universal functions.

Liu et al. proposed the name KAN. A general KAN network consisting of L layers takes x to generate the output as:

$\mathrm{KAN}(x) = (\Phi^{L-1} \circ \Phi^{L-2} \circ \cdots \circ \Phi^{1} \circ \Phi^{0})x$ (3)

Here, $\Phi^{l}$ is the function matrix of the l-th KAN layer or a set of pre-activations.

Let i denote the neuron of the l-th layer and j the neuron of the (l+1)-th layer. The activation function $\varphi^{l}_{j,i}$ connects (l, i) to (l+1, j):

$\varphi^{l}_{j,i}, \quad l = 0,\dots,L-1, \; i = 1,\dots,n_l, \; j = 1,\dots,n_{l+1}$ (4)

where n_{l} is the number of nodes of the l-th layer.

Thus, the function matrix $\Phi^{l}$ can be represented as an $n_{l+1} \times n_l$ matrix of activations:

$$x^{l+1} =
\begin{pmatrix}
\varphi^{l}_{1,1}(\cdot) & \varphi^{l}_{1,2}(\cdot) & \cdots & \varphi^{l}_{1,n_l}(\cdot) \\
\varphi^{l}_{2,1}(\cdot) & \varphi^{l}_{2,2}(\cdot) & \cdots & \varphi^{l}_{2,n_l}(\cdot) \\
\vdots & \vdots & \ddots & \vdots \\
\varphi^{l}_{n_{l+1},1}(\cdot) & \varphi^{l}_{n_{l+1},2}(\cdot) & \cdots & \varphi^{l}_{n_{l+1},n_l}(\cdot)
\end{pmatrix}x^{l}$$

== Implementations ==
To make the KAN layers optimizable, the inner function is formed by the combination of spline and basic functions as the formula:

$$\varphi(x) = w_b\,b(x) + w_s\,\text{spline}(x)$$

where $b(x)$ is the basic function, usually defined as $silu(x) = x/(1+e^{x})$ and $w_b$ is the base weight matrix. Also, $w_s$ is the spline weight matrix and $\text{spline}(x)$ is the spline function. The spline function can be a sum of B-splines.

$$\text{spline}(x) = \sum_{i}c_iB_i(x)$$

Many studies suggested to use other polynomial and curve functions instead of B-spline to create new KAN variants.

== Functions used ==
The choice of functional basis strongly influences the performance of KANs. Common function families include:

- B-splines: Provide locality, smoothness, and interpretability; they are the most widely used in current implementations.
- RBFs (include Gaussian RBFs): Capture localized features in data and are effective in approximating functions with non-linear or clustered structures.
- Chebyshev polynomials: Offer efficient approximation with minimized error in the maximum norm, making them useful for stable function representation.
- Rational function: Useful for approximating functions with singularities or sharp variations, as they can model asymptotic behavior better than polynomials.
- Fourier series: Capture periodic patterns effectively and are particularly useful in domains such as physics-informed machine learning.
- Wavelet functions (DoG, Mexican hat, Morlet, and Shannon): Used for feature extraction as they can capture both high-frequency and low-frequency data components.
- Piecewise linear functions: Provide efficient approximation for multivariate functions in KANs.
- Recent RBF–KAN implementations have used Gaussian, inverse multiquadric, thin-plate spline, and Wendland radial basis functions, with low-degree polynomial enrichment used in some variants.

== Usage ==
In some modern neural architectures like convolutional neural networks (CNNs), recurrent neural networks (RNNs), and Transformers, KANs are typically used as drop-in substitutes for MLP layers. Despite KANs' general-purpose design, researchers have created and used them for a number of tasks:

- Scientific machine learning (SciML): Function fitting, partial differential equations (PDEs) and physical/mathematical laws.
- Continual learning: KANs better preserve previously learned information during incremental updates, avoiding catastrophic forgetting due to the locality of spline adjustments.
- Graph neural networks: Extensions such as Kolmogorov–Arnold Graph Neural Networks (KA-GNNs) integrate KAN modules into message-passing architectures, showing improvements in molecular property prediction tasks.
- Sensor data processing: Kolmogorov–Arnold Networks (KANs) have recently been applied to sensor data processing due to their ability to model complex nonlinear relationships with relatively few parameters and improved interpretability compared to conventional multilayer perceptrons. Applications include industrial soft sensors, biomedical signal analysis, remote sensing, and environmental monitoring systems.
- Physics-informed RBF–KANs have been applied to transient diffusion interface problems with discontinuous material coefficients, including battery-inspired electrolyte-diffusion models.

== Drawbacks ==
KANs can be computationally intensive and require a large number of parameters due to their use of polynomial functions to capture data.

== See also ==
- Kolmogorov–Arnold representation theorem
- Universal approximation theorem
