= Arnold Mathematical Journal =

- Discipline: Mathematics
- Language: English
- Edited by: Sergei Tabachnikov, Maxim Arnold, Vladlen Timorin

Publication details
- History: 2015–present
- Publisher: Springer Science+Business Media on behalf of the Institute for Mathematical Sciences (Stony Brook University)
- Frequency: Quarterly

Standard abbreviations
- ISO 4: Arnold Math. J.

Indexing
- ISSN: 2199-6792 (print); 2199-6806 (web)
- OCLC no.: 904797046

Links
- Journal homepage; Submission page

The Arnold Mathematical Journal is a quarterly peer-reviewed mathematics journal established in 2014. It is organized jointly by the Institute for Mathematical Sciences at Stony Brook University, USA, and Association for Mathematical Research. The journal's editor-in-chief is Sergei Tabachnikov. The journal is abstracted and indexed in ZbMATH and Scopus.

The journal is named after the mathematician Vladimir Arnold, with the choice of name intended as "a declaration that the journal should serve to maintain and promote the scientific style characteristic for Arnold's best mathematical works."
