= Sergei Tabachnikov =

American mathematician

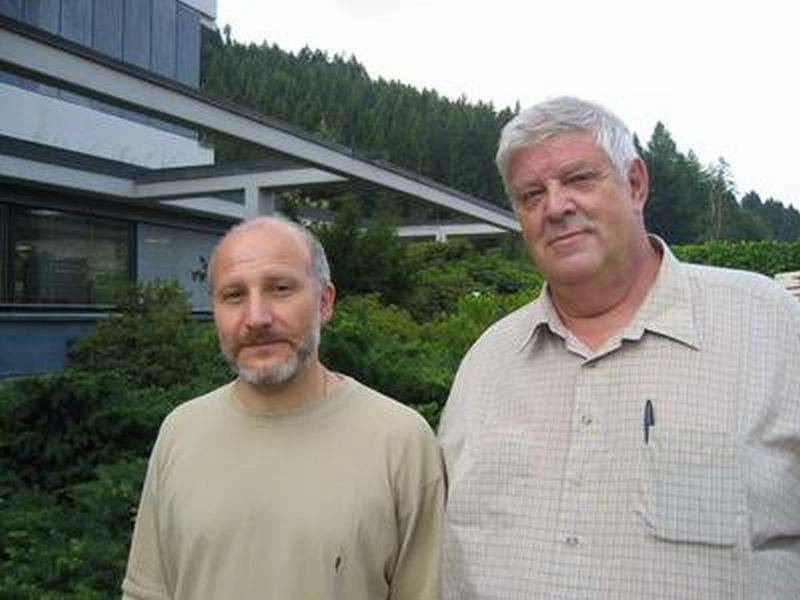
Tabachnikov (on the left) with Dmitry Fuchs in Oberwolfach, 2006

Sergei Tabachnikov, also spelled Serge, (born in 1956) is an American mathematician who works in geometry and dynamical systems. He is currently a Professor of Mathematics at Pennsylvania State University.

== Biography ==
He earned his Ph.D. from Moscow State University in 1987 under the supervision of Dmitry Fuchs and Anatoly Fomenko. He has been living and working in the USA since 1990.

From 2013 to 2015 Tabachnikov served as Deputy Director of the Institute for Computational and Experimental Research in Mathematics (ICERM) in Providence, Rhode Island. He is now Emeritus Deputy Director of ICERM.

He is a fellow of the American Mathematical Society. He has served as Editor-in-Chief of the journal Experimental Mathematics, and is currently serving as Editor-in-Chief of the Arnold Mathematical Journal and as co-Editor-in-Chief of the Mathematical Intelligencer.

A paper on the variability hypothesis by Theodore Hill and Tabachnikov was accepted and retracted by The Mathematical Intelligencer and later The New York Journal of Mathematics (NYJM). There was some controversy over the mathematical model, the peer-review process, and the lack of an official retraction notice from the NYJM.

== Selected publications ==
- Tabachnikov, Serge, ed. (1999). Differential and symplectic topology of knots and curves. Advances in the Mathematical Sciences. Vol. 42. American Mathematical Society. ISBN 978-0-8218-1354-6. MR 1738386.
- Farber, Michael; Tabachnikov, Serge (2002), "Topology of cyclic configuration spaces and periodic trajectories of multi-dimensional billiards", Topology, 41 (3): 553–589, arXiv:math/9911226, doi:10.1016/S0040-9383(01)00021-0, MR 1910041, S2CID 10350816
- Tabachnikov, Serge (2005), Geometry and Billiards, Providence, RI: American Mathematical Society, ISBN 978-0-8218-3919-5, MR 2168892
- Ovsienko, Valentin; Tabachnikov, Serge (2005), Projective differential geometry old and new. From the Schwarzian derivative to the cohomology of diffeomorphism groups, Cambridge Tracts in Mathematics, vol. 165, Cambridge University Press, ISBN 978-0-521-83186-4, MR 2177471
- Fuchs, Dmitry; Tabachnikov, Serge (2007), Mathematical Omnibus. 30 Lectures on Classical Mathematics, Providence, RI: American Mathematical Society, ISBN 978-0-8218-4316-1, MR 2350979
