= Arnold–Kuiper–Massey theorem =

Result about the connection between projective planes and spheres

In projective geometry in mathematics, the Arnold–Kuiper–Massey theorem (or AKM theorem) includes three connected results about projective planes and their connection to spheres. The Arnold–Kuiper–Massey theorem is named after Vladimir Arnold, Nicolaas Kuiper and William Massey, who described its complex version in 1971, 1974 and 1973, respectively. The quaternionic generalization was described by Vladimir Arnold in 1999 as well as by Michael Atiyah and Edward Witten in 2001. The octonionic generalization was described by Michael Atiyah and Jürgen Berndt in 2002.

== Complex AKM theorem ==
The first orthogonal group $\operatorname{O}(1)\cong S^0=\{-1,+1\}\subsetneq\mathbb{R}$ of unit real numbers acts on the complex projective space $\mathbb{C}P^n$ by complex conjugation. For the complex projective plane, the quotient space is homeomorphic to a sphere:

$$\mathbb{C}P^2/\operatorname{O}(1)
\cong S^4.$$

== Quaternionic AKM theorem ==
The first unitary group $\operatorname{U}(1)\cong S^1\subsetneq\mathbb{C}$ of unit complex numbers acts on the imaginary components of the quaternionic projective space $\mathbb{H}P^n$ by multiplication. For the quaternionic projective plane, the quotient space is homeomorphic to a sphere:

$$\mathbb{H}P^2/\operatorname{U}(1)
\cong S^7.$$

== Octonionic AKM theorem ==
The first symplectic group $\operatorname{Sp}(1)\cong S^3\subsetneq\mathbb{H}$ of unit quaternions acts on the second octonionic projective space or Cayley plane $\mathbb{O}P^2$ (there is no $\mathbb{O}P^n$ for $n\geq 3$ due to the octonions not being associative) with:

$$\mathbb{O}P^2/\operatorname{Sp}(1)
\cong S^{13}.$$

== Literature ==
- Arnold, Vladimir (1971). "On disposition of ovals of real plane algebraic curves, involutions of four-dimensional manifolds and arithmetics of integer quadratic forms". Funct. Anal. And Its Appl. 5 (3): 1–9.
- Massey, William (1973). "The quotient space of the complex projective space under conjugation is a 4-sphere" (PDF).
- Kuiper, Nicolaas (1974). "The quotient space of ℂP(2) by complex conjugation is the 4-sphere". Mathematische Annalen. 208 (2): 175–177. doi:10.1007/BF01432386.
- Arnold, Vladimir (1988). "Ramified covering ℂP2→S4, hyperbolicity and projective topology". Siberian Math. Journal. 29 (5): 36–47.
- Arnold, Vladimir (1999). "Relatives of the Quotient of the Complex Projective Plane by the Complex Conjugation". Trudy Matematicheskogo Instituta imeni V.A. Steklova. 224: 56–67.
- Atiyah, Michael; Witten, Edward (2001). "M-Theory dynamics on a manifold of G2-holonomy". Adv. Theor. Math. Phys. 6. arXiv:hep-th/0107177. doi:10.4310/ATMP.2002.v6.n1.a1.
- Atiyah, Michael; Berndt, Jürgen (2003). "Projective planes, Severi varieties and spheres". Surv. Differ. Geom. 8 (1): 1–27. arXiv:math/0206135. doi:10.4310/SDG.2003.v8.n1.a1.
