= Arnold invariants =

Mathematical invariants used to classify plane curves

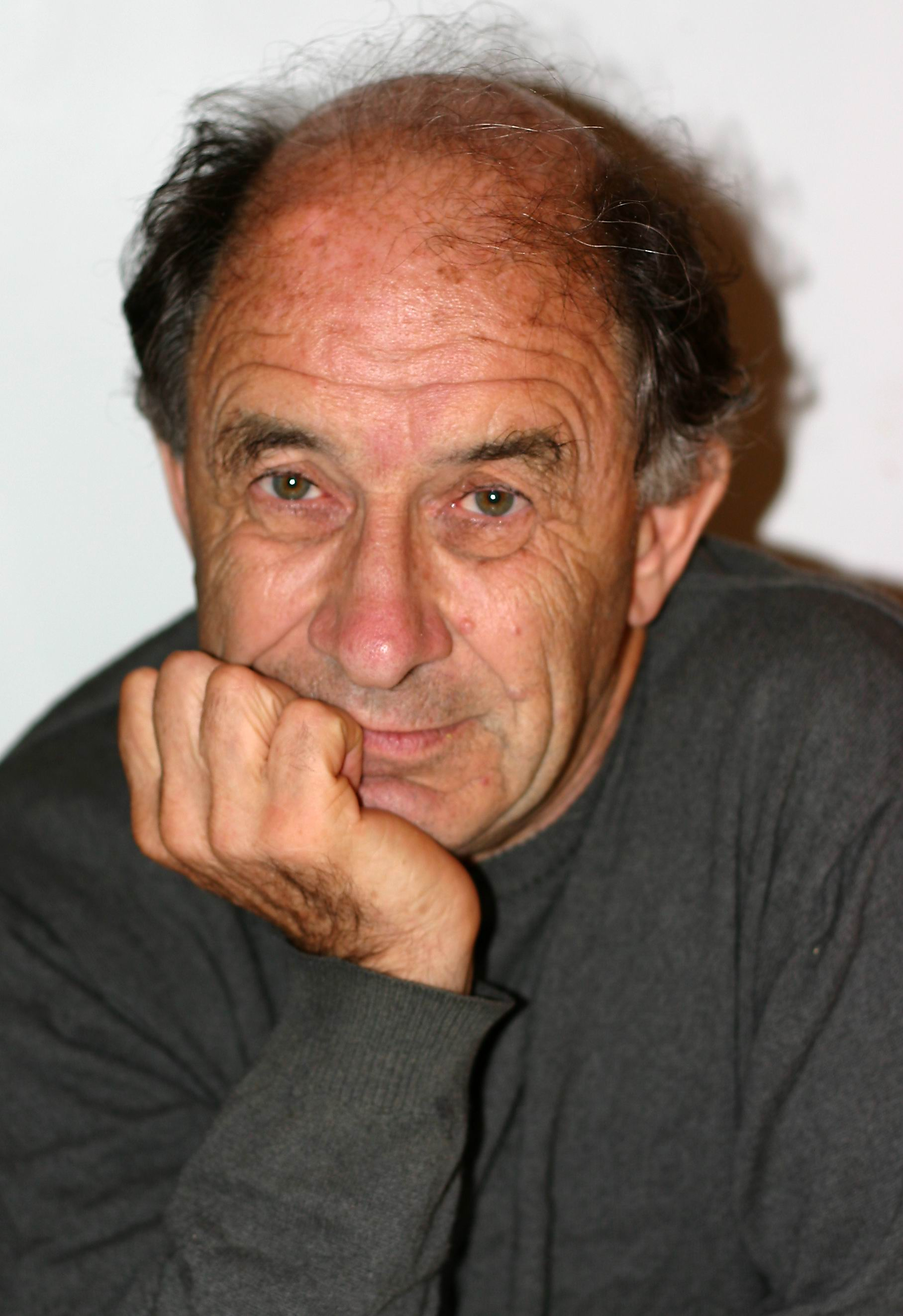
Mathematician Vladimir Arnold

In mathematics, particularly in topology and knot theory, Arnold invariants are invariants introduced by Vladimir Arnold in 1994 for studying the topology and geometry of plane curves.

== Background ==
The Whitney–Graustein theorem states that any two immersed loops (smooth curves in the plane) with the same rotation number can be deformed into each other through a series of continuous transformations. These transformations can be broken down into three elementary types: direct self-tangency moves (where two portions of the curve become tangent with aligned directions, either creating or eliminating two self-intersection points), inverse self-tangency moves (similar to direct moves, but the tangent directions are opposite), and triple point moves (where three portions of the curve intersect at a single point).

== J^{±} invariants ==
The $J^+$ and $J^-$ invariants keep track of how curves change under these transformations and deformations. The $J^+$ invariant increases by 2 when a direct self-tangency move creates new self-intersection points (and decreases by 2 when such points are eliminated), while $J^-$ decreases by 2 when an inverse self-tangency move creates new intersections (and increases by 2 when they are eliminated). Neither invariant changes under triple point moves. The difference between the variants is equal to the total number of self-intersection points in the curve:

$J^+(c) - J^-(c) = \text{number of self-intersection points of }c$.

Mathematicians Oleg Viro and Eugene Gutkin discovered an explicit formula for calculating $J^-$:

$J^-(c) = 1 - \sum_R \text{wind}(c,R)^2 + \sum_q \text{meanwind}(c,q)^2$

where $R$ ranges over the regions into which $c$ divides the plane, $\text{wind}(c,R)$ is the winding number around a point in region $R$, and $\text{meanwind}(c,q)$ is the mean winding number at each self-intersection point $q$. For example, a curve with $k$ curls in standard form has $J^+ = -2k$ and $J^- = -3k$, while a simple circle has $J^+ = J^- = 0$.

== Bridges and channels ==
In 2002, mathematicians Catarina Mendes de Jesus and Maria Carmen Romero Fuster introduced the concepts of bridges and channels for calculating Arnold invariants. A bridge consists of introducing a rectangle in the complement of the curve in the plane while respecting orientations, decomposing a given curve into two smaller curves with known invariants. The invariant of the original curve can then be obtained as a function of the invariants of these two component curves and the index of the bridge relative to the original curve.

An important theorem regarding this decomposition states that a curve with $n$ double points is a tree-like curve if and only if it admits a decomposition into exactly n curves of types $K_0$ and $K_2$ with bridges having no double points, or a decomposition into exactly $n+1$ curves of type $K_1$ (isotopic to the circle) with bridges having double points.
