= Arnold's cat map =

Chaotic map from the torus into itself

Picture showing how the linear map stretches the unit square and how its pieces are rearranged when the modulo operation is performed. The lines with the arrows show the direction of the contracting and expanding eigenspaces

In mathematics, Arnold's cat map is a chaotic map from the torus into itself, named after Vladimir Arnold, who demonstrated its effects in the 1960s using an image of a cat, hence the name. It is a simple and pedagogical example for hyperbolic toral automorphisms.

Thinking of the torus $\mathbb{T}^2$ as the quotient space $\mathbb{R}^2/\mathbb{Z}^2$, Arnold's cat map is the transformation $\Gamma : \mathbb{T}^2 \to \mathbb{T}^2$ given by the formula

$$\Gamma (x,y) = (2x+y,x+y) \bmod 1.$$

Equivalently, in matrix notation, this is

$$\Gamma \left( \begin{bmatrix} x \\ y \end{bmatrix} \right) = \begin{bmatrix} 2 & 1 \\ 1 & 1 \end{bmatrix} \begin{bmatrix} x \\ y \end{bmatrix} \bmod 1 = \begin{bmatrix} 1 & 1 \\ 0 & 1 \end{bmatrix} \begin{bmatrix} 1 & 0 \\ 1 & 1 \end{bmatrix} \begin{bmatrix} x \\ y \end{bmatrix} \bmod 1.$$

That is, with a unit equal to the width of the square image, the image is sheared one unit up, then two units to the right, and all that lies outside that unit square is shifted back by the unit until it is within the square.

== Name ==
The map receives its name from Arnold's 1967 manuscript with André Avez, Problèmes ergodiques de la mécanique classique, in which the outline of a cat was used to illustrate the action of the map on the torus. In the original book it was captioned by a humorous footnote,

The Société Protectrice des Animaux has given permission to reproduce this image, as well as others.

In Arnold's native Russian, the map is known as "okroshka (cold soup) from a cat" (Russian: окрошка из кошки), in reference to the map's mixing properties, and which forms a play on words. Arnold later wrote that he found the name "Arnold's Cat" by which the map is known in English and other languages to be "strange".

== Properties ==
- $\Gamma$ is invertible because the matrix has determinant 1 and therefore its inverse has integer entries,
- $\Gamma$ is area preserving,
- $\Gamma$ has a unique hyperbolic fixed point (the vertices of the square). The linear transformation which defines the map is hyperbolic: its eigenvalues are irrational numbers, one greater and the other smaller than 1 (in absolute value), so they are associated respectively to an expanding and a contracting eigenspace which are also the stable and unstable manifolds. The eigenspaces are orthogonal because the matrix is symmetric. Since the eigenvectors have rationally independent components both the eigenspaces densely cover the torus. Arnold's cat map is a particularly well-known example of a hyperbolic toral automorphism, which is an automorphism of a torus given by a square unimodular matrix having no eigenvalues of absolute value 1.
- The set of the points with a periodic orbit is dense on the torus. Actually a point is periodic if and only if its coordinates are rational.
- $\Gamma$ is topologically transitive (i.e., there is a point whose orbit is dense).
- The number of points with period $n$ is exactly $|\lambda_1^n+\lambda_2^n-2|$ (where $\lambda_1$ and $\lambda_2$ are the eigenvalues of the matrix). For example, the first few terms of this series are 1, 5, 16, 45, 121, 320, 841, 2205 .... (The same equation holds for any unimodular hyperbolic toral automorphism if the eigenvalues are replaced.)
- $\Gamma$ is ergodic and mixing,
- $\Gamma$ is an Anosov diffeomorphism and in particular it is structurally stable.
- The mapping torus of $\Gamma$ is a solvmanifold, and as with other Anosov diffeomorphisms, this manifold has solv geometry.

== The discrete cat map ==
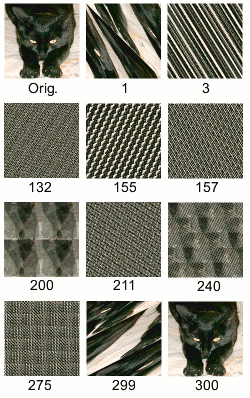
From order to chaos and back. Sample mapping on a picture of 150x150 pixels. The number shows the iteration step; after 300 iterations, the original image returns.

Sample mapping on a picture of a pair of cherries. The image is 74 pixels wide, and takes 114 iterations to be restored, although it appears upside-down at the halfway point (the 57th iteration).

It is possible to define a discrete analogue of the cat map. One of this map's features is that image being apparently randomized by the transformation but returning to its original state after a number of steps. As can be seen in the adjacent picture, the original image of the cat is sheared and then wrapped around in the first iteration of the transformation. After some iterations, the resulting image appears rather random or disordered, yet after further iterations the image appears to have further order—ghost-like images of the cat, multiple smaller copies arranged in a repeating structure and even upside-down copies of the original image—and ultimately returns to the original image.

The discrete cat map describes the phase space flow corresponding to the discrete dynamics of a bead hopping from site $q_t$ ($0 \leq q_t < N$) to site $q_{t+1}$ on a circular ring with circumference $N$, according to the second order equation:

$$q_{t+1} - 3q_t + q_{t-1} = 0 \mod N$$

Defining the momentum variable $p_t = q_t - q_{t-1}$, the above second order dynamics can be re-written as a mapping of the square $0 \leq q, p < N$ (the phase space of the discrete dynamical system) onto itself:

$$q_{t+1} = 2q_{t} + p_t \mod N$$
$$p_{t+1} = q_{t} + p_t \mod N$$

This Arnold cat mapping shows mixing behavior typical for chaotic systems. However, since the transformation has a determinant equal to unity, it is area-preserving and therefore invertible, the inverse transformation being:

$$q_{t-1} = q_t - p_t \mod N$$
$$p_{t-1} = -q_t + 2p_t \mod N$$

For real variables $q$ and $p$, it is common to set $N = 1$. In that case a mapping of the unit square with periodic boundary conditions onto itself results.

When $N$ is set to an integer value, the position and momentum variables can be restricted to integers and the mapping becomes a mapping of a toroidial square grid of points onto itself. Such an integer cat map is commonly used to demonstrate mixing behavior with Poincaré recurrence utilising digital images. The number of iterations needed to restore the image can be shown never to exceed $3N$.

For an image, the relationship between iterations could be expressed as follows:

$$\begin{array}{rrcl}
n=0: \quad  &  T^0 (x,y) &= & \text{Input Image}(x,y) \\
n=1: \quad  &  T^1 (x,y) &= & T^0 \left( \bmod(2x+y, N), \bmod(x+y, N) \right) \\
& &\vdots \\
n=k: \quad  &  T^k (x,y) &= & T^{k-1} \left( \bmod(2x+y, N), \bmod(x+y, N) \right) \\
& &\vdots \\
n=m: \quad  & \text{Output Image}(x,y) &=& T^m (x,y)
\end{array}$$

== Models ==
=== Python code for Arnold's Cat Map ===
import os

from PIL.Image import open as load_pic, new as new_pic

def main(path, iterations, keep_all=False, name="arnold_cat-{name}-{index}.png"):
    """
    Params
        path:str
            path to photograph
        iterations:int
            number of iterations to compute
        name:str
            formattable string to use as template for file names
    """
    title = os.path.splitext(os.path.split(path)[1])[0]
    counter = 0
    while counter < iterations:
        with load_pic(path) as image:
            dim = width, height = image.size
            with new_pic(image.mode, dim) as canvas:
                for x in range(width):
                    for y in range(height):
                        nx = (2 * x + y) % width
                        ny = (x + y) % height

                        canvas.putpixel((nx, height-ny-1), image.getpixel((x, height-y-1)))

        if counter > 0 and not keep_all:
            os.remove(path)
        counter += 1
        print(counter, end="\r")
        path = name.format(name=title, index=counter)
        canvas.save(path)

    return canvas

if __name__ == "__main__":
    path = input("Enter the path to an image:\n\t")
    while not os.path.exists(path):
        path = input("Couldn't find your chosen image, please try again:\n\t")
    result = main(path, 3)
    result.show()

== See also ==
- List of chaotic maps
- Recurrence plot
