= Victor Vasiliev =

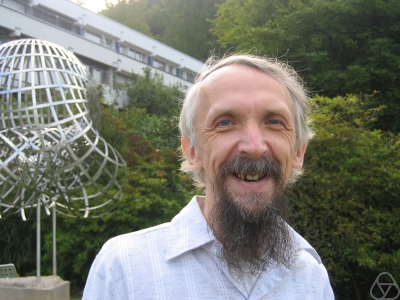
Victor A. Vassiliev in 2008 (photo from MFO)

Victor Anatolyevich Vassiliev or Vasilyev (Russian: Виктор Анатольевич Васильев; born April 10, 1956), is a Soviet and Russian mathematician. He is best known for his discovery of the Vassiliev invariants in knot theory (also known as finite type invariants), which subsume many previously discovered polynomial knot invariants such as the Jones polynomial. He also works on singularity theory, topology, computational complexity theory, integral geometry, symplectic geometry, partial differential equations (geometry of wavefronts), complex analysis, combinatorics, and Picard–Lefschetz theory.

== Biography ==
Vassiliev studied at the Faculty of Mathematics and Mechanics at the Lomonosov University in Moscow until 1981. From 1981 to 1987 he was Senior Researcher at the Documents and Archives Research Institute, Moscow and a part-time mathematics teacher at Specialized Mathematical School No. 57, Moscow. In 1982 he defended his Candidate of Sciences thesis under Vladimir Arnold and received the title of Doctor of Sciences in 1992.

From 1987 to 1989 he was Senior Researcher at the Statistical Information Systems Research Institute in Moscow. From 1989 to 1990 he was Senior Researcher at the Department of Functional Analysis in the Keldysh Institute of Applied Mathematics in Moscow. From 1990 to 1995 he was Leading Researcher at the Department of Mathematics in the Research Institute for System Studies in Moscow. Since 1991 he has been professor at the Mathematics College of the Independent Moscow University. Since 1997 he has been Principal Researcher in the Department of Geometry and Topology at the Steklov Institute of Mathematics in Moscow. Since 2009 he has been professor and department chair in Higher School of Economics -Faculty of Mathematics, HSE.

Since 2019 his is a member and first chairperson of the Russian Academy of Science's Commission against falsification of scientific research.

He has been a visiting professor at the University of Paris VII, and at the Mathematical Sciences Research Institute (MSRI) at the University of California, Berkeley. He was a visiting fellow commoner at Trinity College, Cambridge in October–December 2000.

Vasilyev has been a member of the Russian Academy of Science since 2003 (corresponding member since 1997). He is vice-chief editor of the Journal Functional Analysis and its Applications, and the president of the Moscow Mathematical Society. In 1994 he was an invited speaker at the International Mathematical Congress in Zurich (Plenary Address). In 1986 he received the Moscow Mathematical Society Award.

On 21 February 2014 he together with other protesters against Bolotnaya Square case was arrested near Zamoskvoretsky Court in Moscow. On 5 March 2014 he among the other protesters was sentenced by Zamoskvoretsky Court to 10 thousand roubles (~ $150 US) fine for "resisting police". The European Parliament issued resolutions 2013/2667(RSP) of June 13, 2013 and resolution 2014/2628(RSP) of March 13, 2014 on the political nature of the Bolotnaya Square case. Prisoners of the case were recognized as prisoners of conscience by Amnesty International...Most of the people accused in the Bolotnaya square case then were amnestied in December 2013 due to the public pressure both at home and abroad in support of the political prisoners.

Vassiliev is married, with three children.

In 2022 he emigrated to Israel due to Russia's invasion of Ukraine.
