= Pureland origami =

Origami style

Pureland origami is a style of origami invented by the British paper folder John Smith that uses only mountain and valley folds, folded one at a time. Its aim is to make origami easier for inexperienced folders and those with impaired motor skills. Impaired motor skills make many complex origami processes impossible, leading to the development of alternative manipulations.

== See also ==
- Origami
- Origami techniques
