= Arnold's Problems =

Book of mathematical problems

Arnold's Problems is a book edited by Soviet mathematician Vladimir Arnold, containing 861 mathematical problems from many different areas of mathematics. The book was based on Arnold's seminars at Moscow State University. The problems were created over his decades-long career, and are sorted chronologically (from the period 1956–2003). It was published in Russian as Задачи Арнольда in 2000, and in a translated and revised English edition in 2004 (printed by Springer-Verlag). The book is divided into two parts: formulations of the problems, and comments upon them by 59 mathematicians. This is the largest part of the book. There are also long outlines for programs of research.

== Notable problems ==
The problems in Arnold's Problems are each numbered with a year and a sequence number within the year. They include:

- 1956–1, the napkin folding problem, on whether a paper rectangle can be folded to a shape with larger perimeter than the rectangle
- 1972–33, the Arnold conjecture, on the number of fixed points of a Hamiltonian diffeomorphism
- There are many questions related to the Hilbert–Arnold problem: 1978–6, 1979–16, 1980–1, 1983–11, 1989–17, 1990–24, 1990–25, 1994–51 and 1994–52.
