= Hilbert–Arnold problem =

Mathematical problem concerning limit cycles in dynamical systems

Unsolved problem in mathematics
Is there a uniform bound on limit cycles in generic finite-parameter families of vector fields on a sphere?
More unsolved problems in mathematics

In mathematics, particularly in dynamical systems, the Hilbert–Arnold problem is an unsolved problem concerning the estimation of limit cycles of the dynamics of a flow on a sphere, and whether the number of such cycles can be bounded. A flow on a sphere means that one can imagine that the velocities of particles are prescribed, and a limit cycle is a limit of those velocities, like the Gulf Stream on the globe. The problem asks whether in a generic family of smooth vector fields, smoothly parameterized over a compact set in finite dimensional Euclidean space, the number of limit cycles is uniformly bounded across all parameter values. Thus, under perturbations of climate conditions, it asks whether there is a bounded number of "Gulf Streams". The problem is historically related to Hilbert's sixteenth problem and was first formulated by Russian mathematicians Vladimir Arnold and Yulij Ilyashenko in the 1980s. In Arnold's Problems there are many questions related to the Hilbert–Arnold problem: 1978–6, 1979–16, 1980–1, 1983–11, 1989–17, 1990–24, 1990–25, 1994–51 and 1994–52.

== Overview ==
Polycycle

The problem arises from considering modern approaches to Hilbert's sixteenth problem. While Hilbert's original question focused on polynomial vector fields, mathematical attention shifted toward properties of generic families within certain classes. Unlike polynomial systems, typical smooth systems on a sphere can have arbitrarily many hyperbolic limit cycles that persist under small perturbations. However, the question of uniform boundedness across parameter families remains meaningful and forms the basis of the Hilbert–Arnold problem.

Due to the compactness of both the parameter base and phase space, the Hilbert–Arnold problem can be reduced to a local problem studying bifurcations of special degenerate vector fields. This leads to the concept of polycycles—cyclically ordered sets of singular points connected by phase curve arcs—and their cyclicity, which measures the number of limit cycles born in bifurcations.

=== Local Hilbert–Arnold problem ===
The local version of the Hilbert–Arnold problem asks whether the maximum cyclicity of nontrivial polycycles in generic k-parameter families (known as the bifurcation number $B(k)$) is finite, and seeks explicit upper bounds. The local Hilbert–Arnold problem has been solved for $k=1$ and $k=2$, with $B(1) = 1$ and $B(2) = 2$. For $k=3$, a solution strategy exists but remains incomplete. A simplified version considering only elementary polycycles (where all vertices are elementary singular points with at least one nonzero eigenvalue) has been more thoroughly studied. Ilyashenko and Yakovenko proved in 1995 that the elementary bifurcation number $E(k)$ is finite for all $k>0$.

In 2003, mathematician Vadim Kaloshin established the explicit bound $E(k) < 25^{k^2}$.

== See also ==
- Arnold's Problems#Notable problems
- Bifurcation theory
- Limit cycle
- List of unsolved problems in mathematics
