= Mathematical Methods of Classical Mechanics =

Mathematical physics book by V.I. Arnold

- First English edition
- Author: Vladimir I. Arnol'd
- Original title: Matematicheskie metody klassicheskoi mekhaniki
- Language: Russian
- Subjects: Mathematical physics Classical mechanics
- Genre: Non-fiction
- Published: 1974
- Publication place: USSR
- English publication date: 1978
- Pages: xvi + 516
- ISBN: 0387968903

Mathematical Methods of Classical Mechanics (title of the original in Russian: Математические методы классической механики) is a 1974 textbook by mathematician Vladimir I. Arnold. Originally written in Russian, an English translation was produced in 1978 by A. Weinstein and K. Vogtmann. It is aimed at graduate students.

== Contents ==
- Part I: Newtonian Mechanics
  - Chapter 1: Experimental Facts
  - Chapter 2: Investigation of the Equations of Motion
- Part II: Lagrangian Mechanics
  - Chapter 3: Variational Principles
  - Chapter 4: Lagrangian Mechanics on Manifolds
  - Chapter 5: Oscillations
  - Chapter 6: Rigid Bodies
- Part III: Hamiltonian Mechanics
  - Chapter 7: Differential forms
  - Chapter 8: Symplectic Manifolds
  - Chapter 9: Canonical Formalism
  - Chapter 10: Introduction to Perturbation Theory
- Appendices
  - Riemannian curvature
  - Geodesics of left-invariant metrics on Lie groups and the hydrodynamics of ideal fluids
  - Symplectic structures on algebraic manifolds
  - Contact structures
  - Dynamical systems with symmetries
  - Normal forms of quadratic Hamiltonians
  - Normal forms of Hamiltonian systems near stationary points and closed trajectories
  - Theory of perturbations of conditionally period motion and Kolmogorov's theorem
  - Poincaré's geometric theorem, its generalizations and applications
  - Multiplicities of characteristic frequencies, and ellipsoids depending on parameters
  - Short wave asymptotics
  - Lagrangian singularities
  - The Kortweg-de Vries equation
  - Poisson structures
  - On elliptic coordinates
  - Singularities of ray systems

== Russian original and translations ==
The original Russian first edition Математические методы классической механики was published in 1974 by Наука. A second edition was published in 1979, and a third in 1989. The book has since been translated into a number of other languages, including French, German, Japanese and Mandarin.

== Reviews ==
The Bulletin of the American Mathematical Society said, "The [book] under review [...] written by a distinguished mathematician [...is one of] the first textbooks [to] successfully to present to students of mathematics and physics, [sic] classical mechanics in a modern setting."

A book review in the journal Celestial Mechanics said, "In summary, the author has succeeded in producing a mathematical synthesis of the science of dynamics. The book is well presented and beautifully translated [...] Arnold's book is pure poetry; one does not simply read it, one enjoys it."

== See also ==
- List of textbooks in classical and quantum mechanics

== Bibliography ==
- Arnold, Vladimir I. (16 May 1989) [First published in 1974]. Mathematical Methods of Classical Mechanics Математические методы классической механики. Graduate Texts in Mathematics. Vol. 60. Translated by Vogtmann, Karen; Weinstein, Alan D. (2nd ed.). New York: Springer-Verlag. ISBN 978-0-387-96890-2. OCLC 18681352.
