= Alexander Kamensky (historian) =

Soviet and Russian academic, specialist in 18th-century Russia

- Александр Борисович Каменский
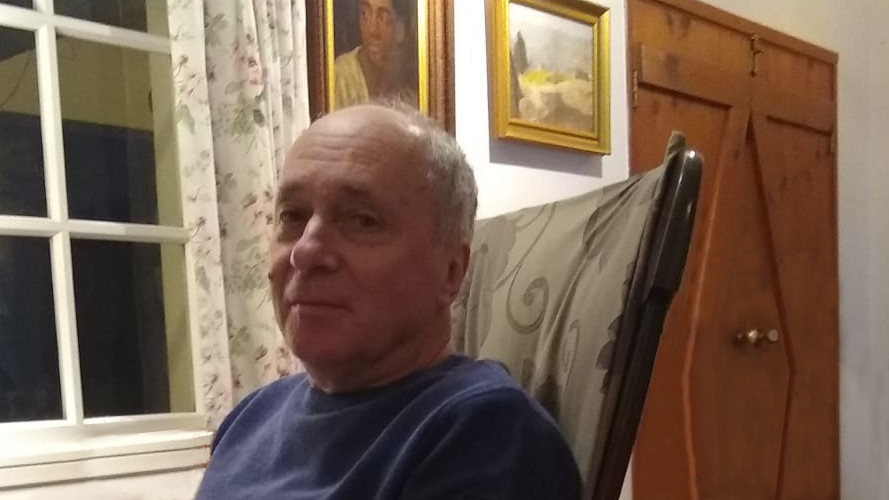
- Kamensky in 2025
- Born: April 26, 1954 (age 72); Moscow, Soviet Union
- Citizenship: Russia
- Occupations: Historian, Professor
- Title: Professor
- Awards: Medal In Commemoration of the 850th Anniversary of Moscow (1997), Certificate of Merit of the Ministry of Science and Higher Education of the Russian Federation (2022)

Academic background
- Education: Doctor of Historical Sciences
- Alma mater: Krupskaya Moscow Regional Pedagogical Institute
- Academic advisors: Viktor Buganov; Alexander Stanislavsky

Academic work
- Discipline: History of Russia
- Sub-discipline: Late 17th – early 19th centuries; Historiography
- Institutions: Institute of History and Archives, Russian State University for the Humanities, Higher School of Economics

Alexander Borisovich Kamensky (Александр Борисович Каменский; born 26 April 1954, Moscow, Soviet Union) is a Soviet and Russian historian, Doctor of Historical Sciences, and professor, specializing in the history of 18th-century Russia.

He was born in Moscow into a family of engineers and graduated from the Faculty of History of the Moscow Regional Pedagogical Institute. → His early career included work in archival and research institutions. Since 1988, he has taught at the Institute of History and Archives, which in 1991 became part of the Russian State University for the Humanities (RSUH). He headed a department at RSUH, and in 2000 received the title of professor. In 2010, he moved to the Higher School of Economics (HSE), where he contributed to the creation of the School of Historical Sciences; since 2023 he has been its academic supervisor. →

Kamensky defended his candidate dissertation in 1984 and his doctoral dissertation in 1998. He is active in the professional community and has appeared as a public historian in the media, as well as taking part in documentary films as an expert and consultant. → Reviewers have noted Kamensky’s revision of several established concepts and categories in the study of 18th-century Russian history. →

In his public statements, Kamensky has opposed the imposition of a single version of the past and teaching history as a set of facts. He has advocated methods that develop critical thinking and the presentation of different viewpoints in textbooks. → He has received a number of state and university awards. His students and graduate students have repeatedly recognized him as the best teacher of the year. →

== Biography ==
=== Early life ===
He was born in 1954 in Moscow. His parents were chemical engineers, worked in branch research institutes, held candidate degrees, and at the same time took an active interest in culture and art. In the family, obtaining higher education was considered the norm. Kamensky studied at one of Moscow’s leading schools, showing a particular interest in the humanities, especially history.

=== Career ===
In 1978, while still a fourth-year student, Kamensky began working at the Central State Archive of Ancient Acts (TSGADA). After graduating from the institute, he entered postgraduate studies, where he researched the history of Russia of the 18th century under the supervision of Viktor Buganov and Alexander Stanislavsky. In 1985 Kamensky moved from the RSAAA to the All-Union Research Institute for Documentation and Archival Science (VNIIDAD). After three years at VNIIDAD, in 1988 he transferred to the Institute of History and Archives, which in 1991 became part of the Russian State University for the Humanities (RSUH).

From 1996 to 2009, Kamensky headed the Department of National History of the Ancient World and the Middle Ages at RSUH (since 2007 — the Department of History of Medieval and Early Modern Russia). In 2000 he received the academic title of professor.

In 2010, Kamensky moved from RSUH to the Higher School of Economics (HSE), where from 2010 to 2015 he served as dean of the Faculty of History. After the Faculty of History was reorganized into the School of Historical Sciences, from 2015 to 2023 he was the head of the School, and since 2023 he has been its academic supervisor.

== Academic work ==
In 1984, he defended his candidate dissertation on the topic "The ruling estate-class and the state apparatus of the Russian centralized state in the works of historians and archivists of the second half of the 18th century: a source study." The wording of the topic was dictated by the impossibility under Soviet academic conditions of using the word "nobility" in the dissertation title.

He took part in the work of the "People’s Archive," established in 1989 at the Institute of History and Archives, which collected documents of ordinary citizens who lived in the 20th century, as well as sources on contemporary history. These materials were later transferred to the State Archive of the Russian Federation.

In the 1990s, Kamensky published a number of books on the history of 18th-century Russia, including a study of archival history during this period and a biography of Empress Catherine the Great. In 1997, his generalizing book on the history of 18th-century Russia was published in English, translated by American professor David Griffiths. Based on the research presented in this book, in 1998 Kamensky defended his doctoral dissertation, which was subsequently published as the monograph *From Peter I to Paul I: Reforms in Russia of the 18th century. An experience of comprehensive analysis* (1999).

Kamensky was a member of the Russian Society for the Study of the 18th Century, the Academic Council of the Russian State Archive of Ancient Acts, and the International Study Group on Eighteenth-Century Russia. He gave papers at Russian and international conferences of historians.

From 2018 to 2024, he was also a member of the editorial board of the academic journal Chelovek.

As a public historian, Kamensky appeared on radio and television, and participated in various films as an expert and consultant. In particular, he served as the academic consultant for the historical documentary series Russian Empire (2000–2003) by Leonid Parfyonov.

== Reception ==
American historian George Munro described Kamensky’s monograph on the Russian Empire of the 18th century as an example of a new post-Soviet scholarly approach, emphasizing the author’s effort to view the period as a whole rather than focusing on events that generated Russia’s contemporary problems. The reviewer noted Kamensky’s excellent command of both Russian sources and research and Western historiography. Munro highlighted Kamensky’s systematic examination of laws and institutions, rather than only rulers’ biographies, and his departure from the “reform–stagnation” paradigm toward seeing modernization as a continuous process.

British historian Maureen Perrie saw in Kamensky’s interest in monarchs’ biographies when covering the 18th century an echo of the Russian pre-revolutionary historical school. She acknowledged Kamensky’s contribution to the study of the biography of Catherine II, describing it as a "clear and well-organized historical narrative," as well as the soundness of his assessments of the personalities and events of the era. At the same time, Perrie criticized what she considered the insufficient attention in his work to the lives of the peoples of the expanding Russian Empire and its cultural life.

Critic and culturologist Vasily Kostyrko emphasized the innovative character of Kamensky’s approach in his works on 18th-century Russian history: the revision of familiar categories such as "feudalism," "estates," and "class struggle," and the turn to concepts of modernization. In his view, Kamensky’s method is simple and perfect: first, a comprehensive examination of legislative acts from the time of Peter I to Paul I; and second, an analysis of the mentality and social structure of Russian society at each stage of its reform. Kostyrko notes Kamensky’s demonstration of the paradoxical fact that Peter the Great’s reforms strengthened serfdom and weakened the development of a Russian analogue of the "third estate."

According to historian Tatyana Belova, in his monograph From Peter I to Paul I: Reforms in Russia of the 18th Century, Kamensky questions the common notion that Russian history consists of alternating brief periods of reformist activity and long periods of counter-reforms. She notes that Kamensky presented a fundamentally new view of the pivotal 18th century in Russian history, focusing on the modernization of Russian society and the state, for the first time considered as a single integral process, in an effort to address the questions of what reform is and whether progressive political development is possible for Russia.

== Views ==
Kamensky considers it meaningless to impose on schoolchildren a single, non-alternative version of the past; in his view, a history textbook should be electronic and interactive, teaching students to search for and comprehend information and to form their own opinions. He believes it is important that different points of view be presented in school textbooks. He pointed out the absence of the word "knowledge" in the concept developed in Russia for a single history textbook.

He criticizes the traditional model of history education for reducing history to a set of facts and names, as well as for the separate teaching of Russian and world history, which leads to their division in the minds of students. According to Kamensky, people who have received a traditional historical education often become narrow specialists, unable to see the problems they deal with in a broad historical context.

Alongside the prevailing view in world scholarship that a historian should primarily try to assess an event from the value system of the era in question, Kamensky believes that some events and phenomena of history, despite all possible caveats regarding specific historical conditions, nevertheless cannot avoid a moral evaluation if one acknowledges the "distinction in the world between good and evil."

According to Kamensky, a person who mechanically repeats official slogans is hardly capable of being a good patriot. He considers the militarization of the concept of patriotism a major mistake. In his view, the foundation for forming Russian patriotism should include Russian literature and Russian culture, but also the "dark" pages of history and shameful episodes such as serfdom in Russia, together with pride in overcoming them.

In February 2022, Kamensky signed an open letter by Russian scholars and science journalists condemning the invasion of Ukraine and calling for the withdrawal of Russian troops from Ukrainian territory.

== Honours and recognition ==
In connection with his professional activity, Alexander Kamensky has received a number of awards:

- Medal In Commemoration of the 850th Anniversary of Moscow (1997)
- Certificate of Gratitude, HSE (2012)
- Certificate of Merit, HSE (2016)
- Honorary Badge, 2nd class, HSE (2019)
- Letter of Appreciation from the Rector of HSE (2019)
- Certificate of Merit of the Ministry of Science and Higher Education of the Russian Federation (2022)
- Medal "For Contribution to the Development of the University," HSE (2024)
- Certificate of Merit, Faculty of Humanities, HSE (2024)

Based on annual student and graduate student voting at HSE, in 2012–2013, 2015, and 2020 Kamensky was recognized as the best teacher.

== Bibliography ==
Alexander Kamensky is the author, co-author, and editor of the following scholarly publications:

=== Scholarly monographs ===
In Russian

- Kamensky, Alexander B. (1991). Архивное дело в России XVIII века: историко-культурный аспект (постановка проблемы, историография, источники) [Archival science in Russia in the 18th century: a historical-cultural perspective (problem statement, historiography, sources)] (in Russian). Moscow: RSUH.
- Kamensky, Alexander B. (1992). Под сенью Екатерины…: Вторая половина XVIII в [Under the Aegis of Catherine…: The Second Half of the 18th Century] (in Russian). St Petersburg: Lenizdat. p. 448. ISBN 5-289-01111-0.
- Kamensky, Alexander B. (1997). Жизнь и судьба императрицы Екатерины Великой [The Life and Fate of Empress Catherine the Great] (in Russian). Moscow: Znanie. p. 288. ISBN 5-07-002765-4.
- Kamensky, Alexander B. (1999). От Петра I до Павла I: реформы в России XVIII в. Опыт целостного анализа [From Peter I to Paul I: Reforms in Russia of the 18th Century. An Experience of Comprehensive Analysis] (in Russian). Moscow: RSUH. p. 575. ISBN 5-7281-0396-0.

- 2nd ed.: Moscow: RSUH, 2001. — 576 pp.
- 3rd ed.: St Petersburg: Nauka, 2019. — 670 pp. — (World History Library). — ISBN 978-5-02-037130-9

- Kamensky, Alexander B. (1999). Российская империя в XVIII в.: традиции и модернизация [The Russian Empire in the 18th Century: Traditions and Modernization]. Historia rossica (in Russian). Moscow: New Literary Observer. p. 326. ISBN 5-86793-073-4.
- Kamensky, Alexander B. (2006). Исторический лексикон: История в лицах и событиях. XVIII век [Historical Lexicon: History in Figures and Events. The 18th Century] (in Russian). Moscow: Akademkniga. ISBN 978-5949082072.
- Kamensky, Alexander B. (2006). Повседневность русских городских обывателей. Исторические анекдоты из провинциальной жизни XVIII в. [The Everyday Life of Russian Urban Dwellers: Historical Anecdotes from Provincial Life of the 18th Century] (in Russian). Moscow: RSUH. p. 403. ISBN 5-7281-0807-5.
- Kamensky, Alexander B. (2006). Россия в XVIII веке [Russia in the 18th Century] (in Russian). Moscow: AST-Astreľ.
- Kamensky, Alexander B. (2017). Россия в XVIII столетии. Общество и память: Исследования по социальной истории и исторической памяти [Russia in the 18th Century. Society and Memory: Studies in Social History and Historical Memory]. Historical Book (in Russian). St Petersburg: Aleteya. p. 348. ISBN 978-5-906910-57-8.
- Kamensky, Alexander B. (2024). Тайные безумцы Российской империи XVIII века [The Secret Madmen of the Russian Empire in the 18th Century] (in Russian). Moscow: New Literary Observer. p. 304. ISBN 978-5-4448-2545-7.

In English

- Kamenskii, Aleksandr B. (1997). The Russian Empire in the Eighteenth Century: Searching for a Place in the World. Armonk, New York; London: M. E. Sharpe. p. 382. ISBN 978-1563245749.
- Kamenskii, Alexander (2020). Catherine the Great: A Reference Guide to Her Life and Works. Lanham: Rowman & Littlefield Publishers. p. 196. ISBN 978-1538130278.

=== Selected scholarly articles ===
In English

- Kamenskii, A. B. (2009). "The Battle of Poltava in Russian Historical Memory". Harvard Ukrainian Studies. 31 (1–4): 195–204.
- Kamenskii, A. B. (2014). "David A. Frick, "Kith, Kin, and Neighbors"". Cahiers du monde russe. 55 (3–4): 348–353. doi:10.4000/monderusse.8023.
- Kamenskii, A. B. (2014). "Do We Know the Composition of 18th-Century Russian Society". Cahiers du monde russe. 55 (1–2): 135–148. doi:10.4000/monderusse.7989.
- Kamenskii, A. B. (2015). "Business Women in Eighteenth-Century Russian Provincial Towns". Word and Image in Russian History: Essays in Honor of Gary Marker. Boston: Academic Studies Press. pp. 206–221.
- Kamenskii, A. B. (2015). "Citizenship in Eighteenth-Century Russian Towns". Urban Liberties and Citizenship from the Middle Ages up to Now. Luxembourg: Porta Alba Verlag. pp. 201–210.
- Kamenskii, A. B. (2017). "Catherine the Great: The Foundation of Unlimited Power". Female Rulers. Portraits of Power. Stockholm: Axel and Margaret Ax:son Johnson Foundation. pp. 101–117.
- Kamenskii, A. B. (2017). "Honor and Dishonor in Eighteenth-Century Russia". Seeing Muscovy Anew: Politics—Institutions—Culture. Essays in Honor of Nancy Shields Kollmann. Bloomington, Indiana: Slavica Publishers. pp. 263–272.
- Kamenskii, A. B. (2018). "Review of: Jan Hennings. "Russia and Courtly Europe"". American Historical Review. 123 (4): 1426–1427. doi:10.1093/ahr/rhy167.
- Kamenskii, A. B. (2019). "Catherine the Great's Foreign Policy Reconsidered". Journal of Modern Russian History and Historiography. 12: 169–187. doi:10.1163/22102388-01201006.
- Kamenskii, A. B. (2019). "The Case of Tsarevich Aleksei in Nineteenth–Twentieth-Century Russian Historiography and Culture". Die Flucht des Thronfolgers Aleksej. Krise in der «Balance of Power» und den österreichisch-russischen Beziehungen am Anfang des 18. Jahrhunderts. Berlin: LIT Verlag. pp. 351–367.
- Kamenskii, A. B. (2021). "Church and State and the Conflict over the Erosion of Morals in 18th-Century Russia". Russian History. 48 (2): 169–186. doi:10.30965/18763316-12340028.

In French

- Kamenskii, A. B. (2009). "Gerhard Friedrich Müller: aux sources de la science historique russe". Slavica Occitania (in French). 28 (28). Toulouse: 73–87. doi:10.3406/slaoc.2009.2360.
- Kamenskii, A. B. (2014). "Isabel de Madariaga". Revue des études slaves (in French). 85 (3): 599–602. doi:10.4000/res.404.

=== Chapters in books ===
- Kamensky, Alexander B.; Andriainen, S. (2010). "Петр Иванович и Иван Ивановичи Шуваловы" [Petr Ivanovich and Ivan Ivanovich Shuvalov]. In Andriainen, S. (ed.). Петр Иванович Шувалов. Иван Иванович Шувалов. Избранные труды [Petr Ivanovich Shuvalov. Ivan Ivanovich Shuvalov. Selected Works] (in Russian). Moscow: ROSSPEN. pp. 5–44.
- Kamensky, Alexander B. (2011). "Предисловие к статье И. М. Савельевой и А. В. Полетаева «Исторические знания американцев»" [Preface to the article by I. M. Savelyeva and A. V. Poletaev “Historical Knowledge of Americans”]. In Savelyeva, Irina M. (ed.). Неклассическое наследие. Андрей Полетаев [Nonclassical Legacy. Andrei Poletaev] (in Russian). Moscow: HSE University Press. pp. 162–165.
- Kamensky, Alexander B. (2013). "Учителя" [Teachers]. Поколения ВШЭ. Учителя об учителях [HSE Generations. Teachers about Teachers] (in Russian). Moscow: HSE University Press. pp. 278–281.
- Kamensky, Alexander B. (2013). "Просвещение и власть" [Enlightenment and Power]. In Karp, S. Ya.; Chubaryan, A. O. (eds.). Всемирная история. В 6 томах. Т. 4: Мир в XVIII веке [World History. In 6 volumes. Vol. 4: The World in the 18th Century] (in Russian). Moscow: Nauka. pp. 104–132.
- Kamensky, Alexander B. (2013). "Становление Российской империи" [The Formation of the Russian Empire]. In Karp, S. Ya.; Chubaryan, A. O. (eds.). Всемирная история. В 6 томах. Т. 4: Мир в XVIII веке [World History. In 6 volumes. Vol. 4: The World in the 18th Century] (in Russian). Moscow: Nauka. pp. 542–567.
- Kamensky, Alexander B. (2016). "Глава 1. Реформы Петра Великого (разд. 1–2, 4–8); Глава 3. Реформы второй половины XVIII — начала XIX вв.; Глава 4. Реформы первой четверти XIX в." [Chapter 1. Peter the Great’s Reforms (secs. 1–2, 4–8); Chapter 3. Reforms of the Second Half of the 18th – Early 19th Centuries; Chapter 4. Reforms of the First Quarter of the 19th Century]. In Kamensky, Alexander B. (ed.). Реформы в России с древнейших времён до конца XX в.: в 4 т. Т. 2: XVIII — первая половина XIX в. [Reforms in Russia from the Earliest Times to the End of the 20th Century, in 4 vols. Vol. 2: The 18th Century — First Half of the 19th Century] (in Russian). Moscow: ROSSPEN. pp. 24–364.
- Kamensky, Alexander B.; Korchmina, E. S. (2016). "Реформирование экономики (глава 1.4)" [Reforming the Economy (chapter 1.4)]. In Kamensky, Alexander B. (ed.). Реформы в России с древнейших времён до конца XX в.: в 4 т. Т. 2: XVIII — первая половина XIX в. [Reforms in Russia from the Earliest Times to the End of the 20th Century, in 4 vols. Vol. 2: The 18th Century — First Half of the 19th Century] (in Russian). Moscow: ROSSPEN. pp. 74–85.

=== Textbooks ===
- Kamensky, Alexander B. (1991). Архивное дело в России XVIII века: историко-культурный аспект (постановка проблемы, историография, источники) [Archival science in Russia in the 18th century: a historical-cultural perspective (problem statement, historiography, sources)] (Textbook for a special course) (in Russian). Moscow: RSUH. p. 71.
- Anisimov, Evgeny V.; Kamensky, Alexander B. (1994). Россия в XVIII — первой половине XIX вв.: История. Историк. Документ. Экспериментальное учебное пособие [Russia in the 18th and first half of the 19th centuries: History. Historian. Document. An experimental textbook] (in Russian). Moscow: MIROS. p. 335. ISBN 5-7084-0089-7.

=== Compilations and edited volumes ===
- I. V. Volkova (ed.); N. M. Andreeva; L. M. Babaeva; T. M. Bulavkina; T. M. Goryaeva; A. Yu. Kamenskaya; A. B. Kamensky; L. G. Kiseleva; I. A. Kornilaeva; L. G. Kuza; V. M. Magidov; V. V. Olevskaya; L. M. Pogodina; E. N. Sakharova, ed. (1989). Государственные архивы СССР: справочник. Часть 1 [State Archives of the USSR: A Handbook. Part 1] (in Russian). Moscow: Mysl. pp. 603, [1]. ISBN 978-5-244-00336-9.
- Müller, Gerhard Friedrich (1996). Kamensky, Alexander B. (ed.). Сочинения по истории России. Избранное [Writings on the History of Russia. Selected Works]. Monuments of Historical Thought (in Russian). Moscow: Nauka. p. 448. ISBN 5-02-009637-7.
- Kamensky, Alexander B., ed. (2008). Екатерина II. Искусство управлять [Catherine II: The Art of Governing]. History of Russia and the House of Romanov in the Memoirs of Contemporaries, 17th–20th Centuries (in Russian). Moscow: Sergei Dubov Foundation. p. 656. ISBN 978-5-94177-009-0.
- Kamensky, Alexander B., ed. (2016). Реформы в России с древнейших времён до конца XX в.: в 4 т. Т. 2: XVIII — первая половина XIX в. [Reforms in Russia from the Earliest Times to the End of the 20th Century, in 4 vols. Vol. 2: The 18th Century — First Half of the 19th Century] (in Russian). Moscow: ROSSPEN. p. 429.
- Kamensky, Alexander B., ed. (2021). «Сибирские заметки» чиновника и сочинителя Ипполита Канарского ["Siberian Notes" by the Official and Writer Ippolit Kanarsky] (in Russian). Moscow: HSE University Press. p. 144. ISBN 978-5-7598-2310-0.
