= Alexander Poddiakov =

Russian psychologist

Alexander Nikolaevich Poddiakov
- Born: 21 March 1962 (age 64); Moscow, Russia
- Scientific career
- Fields: Professor, doctor of psychology with multiple doctoral degrees

Alexander N. Poddiakov (Alexander Nikolaevich Poddiakov, Russian Алекса́ндр Никола́евич Поддья́ков), born on March 21, 1962, in Moscow, is a Russian psychologist, doctor of psychology and professor.

== Biography ==
He graduated in 1985 the Faculty of Psychology of Moscow State University. In 1990 he defended his first doctoral degree of psychological sciences on the topic "Formation of the activity of experimentation in preschoolers with new objects of varying complexity". In 2001 he defended his second, post-doctoral degree of psychological sciences on the topic "Development of research initiative in childhood". In 2009 he was awarded the academic title of professor.

Alexander N. Poddiakov is a professor of the Department of Educational Psychology and Pedagogy, Faculty of Psychology, Lomonosov Moscow State University, as well as a professor of the Department of Psychology, Faculty of Social Sciences, National Research University at the Higher School of Economics.

He is a member of the editorial boards of the journals "Organizational Psychology", "Psychological Research", "Psychology. Journal of the Higher School of Economics"," Culture and Psychology "," Integrative Psychological and Behavioral Science "," Mathematical Thinking and Learning ". Also he is a Chief Researcher of the Laboratory of Psychology and Psychophysiology of Creativity, Institute of Psychology, Russian Academy of Sciences.

Alexander N. Poddiakov is the author of over 150 publications.

== Scientific focuses ==
Alexander N. Poddiakov develops the concept of research and creative thinking of a person in complex developing areas, in conditions of high novelty, dynamics and contradictions. The concept is interdisciplinary, integrating the provisions of psychology, the theory of complex dynamical systems, logic, mathematics and Conflict resolution. One of the key points of the analysis is help and counteraction as two fundamental types of interaction in various types of activities.

In the field of psychodiagnostics, he develops the position about the impossibility of a standard test of creative thinking as a "standard for measuring non-standardness". He discovered and analyzed an error in the PISA-2012 (Programme for International Student Assessment) diagnostic task for creative thinking: the developers created in advance a closed list of creative answers that were guided in the assessment, without taking into account other possible correct solutions.

== Selected publications ==
- Poddiakov A. N. Preschoolers' acquirement of competences in factor combining and factor interaction // Developmental tasks: towards a cultural analysis of human development / J. ter Laak, P. G. Heymans, A. I. Podol'skij (Eds.). Dordrecht: Kluwer Academic Publishers. 1994. pp. 173–186.
- Poddiakov A. N. Counteraction as a crucial factor of learning, education and development: opposition to help. // Forum: Qualitative Social Research. 2001. Vol. 2(3).
- Poddiakov A. N. The space of responsibility of cultural psychology. Review essay on the book: Benson C. The cultural psychology of self: place, morality and art in human worlds. London and New York: Routledge, Taylor and Francis Group, 2001 // Culture and psychology. 2002. Vol. 8 (3). pp. 327–336.
- Poddiakov A. N. The philosophy of education: the problem of counteraction // Journal of Russian and East European Psychology. 2003, Vol. 41, N 6, pp. 37–52.
- Poddiakov A. N. Teaching economic thought: landscapes after battles. Commentary on the article: van Bavel R., Gaskell G. Narrative and systemic modes of economic thought//Culture & psychology. 2004. Vol. 10(4). pp. 441–453.
- Poddiakov A. N. «Trojan horse» teaching in economic behavior// Social Science Research Network, 2004.
- Poddiakov A. N. Coping with problems created by others: directions of development. Commentary on the articles: Hedegaard, M. Strategies for dealing with conflicts in value positions between home and school: influences on ethnic minority students' development of motives and identity, and Schousboe, I. Local and global perspectives on the everyday lives of children // Culture & Psychology. 2005, 11(2), pp. 227–240.
- Poddiakov A. N. Ambivalence and cognitive heuristics for dealing with ambiguity in complex social worlds // Estudios de Psicologia. 2006. Vol. 27. No. 1. P. 101–116.
- Poddiakov A. N. Developmental comparative psychology and development of comparisons // Culture & psychology. 2006. Vol. 12 (3). P 352–377.
- Poddiakov A. N. Zones of development, zones of counteraction, and the area of responsibility // Cultural-historical psychology. Digest. 2006. No. 1-3. P. 14–15.
- Poddiakov A. N. Striving towards novelty in a scientific dialogue // Otherness in Question: Labyrinths of the Self / L. Simao, J. Valsiner (Eds.). Greenwich: Information Age Publishing, 2007. P. 215–226.
- Poddiakov A. N. Development and inhibition of learning abilities in agents and intelligent systems // Proceedings of IADIS International conference «Intelligent systems and agents» / Ed. by A.P.dos Reis, K.Blashki, Y.Xiao. July 3–8, 2007. Lisbon, Portugal. P. 235–238.
- Poddiakov A. N. Mental development. The differentiation principle // Social Sciences. 2008. Vol.39. No. 4. P. 162–166.
- Poddiakov, A.N. (2010). Intransitivity cycles and complex problem solving.
- Poddiakov, A.N. (2011). Didactic objects for development of young children's combinatorial experimentation and causal-experimental thought. International Journal of Early Years Education. Vol. 19. No. 1. pp. 65–78.
- Poddiakov, A.N. (2012). Complex Problem Solving at PISA 2012 and PISA 2015: Interaction with Complex Reality.
- Poddiakov A.N. (2013). Catching a Flying Ball–is that Really that Easy? A Contribution to the Critique of G. Gigerenzer's Approach.
- Poddiakov A. & Valsiner. J. (2013). Intransitivity cycles and their transformations: How dynamically adapting systems function. In: Lee Rudolph (Ed.). Qualitative mathematics for the social sciences: Mathematical models for research on cultural dynamics. Abingdon, NY: Routledge. pp. 343–391.
- Poddiakov A.N. Complicology: study of developing, diagnosing and destructive difficulties. Moscow, Publishing house of HSE.
- Alexander Poddiakov Multiple dilemmas of help and counteraction to teaching in complex social worlds/Behavioral and Brain Sciences (2015). V.38. No.1 C.e56

== Awards and accomplishments ==
- Twice "Best Teacher" at the Higher School of Economics in 2012 and 2015
- The book "Psychology of competition in teaching/learning" by A. Poddiakov won The Best Monograph on Psychology Award at the All-Russian Competition of Psychological Books in 2007
