= ICEF =

ICEF may refer to:

- International College of Economics and Finance, Moscow, Russia
- International Congress on Engineering and Food, a quadrennial event organized by the International Association for Engineering and Food
- International Federation of Chemical, Energy and General Workers' Unions, 1907–1995
