= Higher School of Economics =

Public university in Russia

Coordinates: 55°45′41.4″N 37°37′59.7″E

HSE University
- Национальный исследовательский университет «Высшая школа экономики»
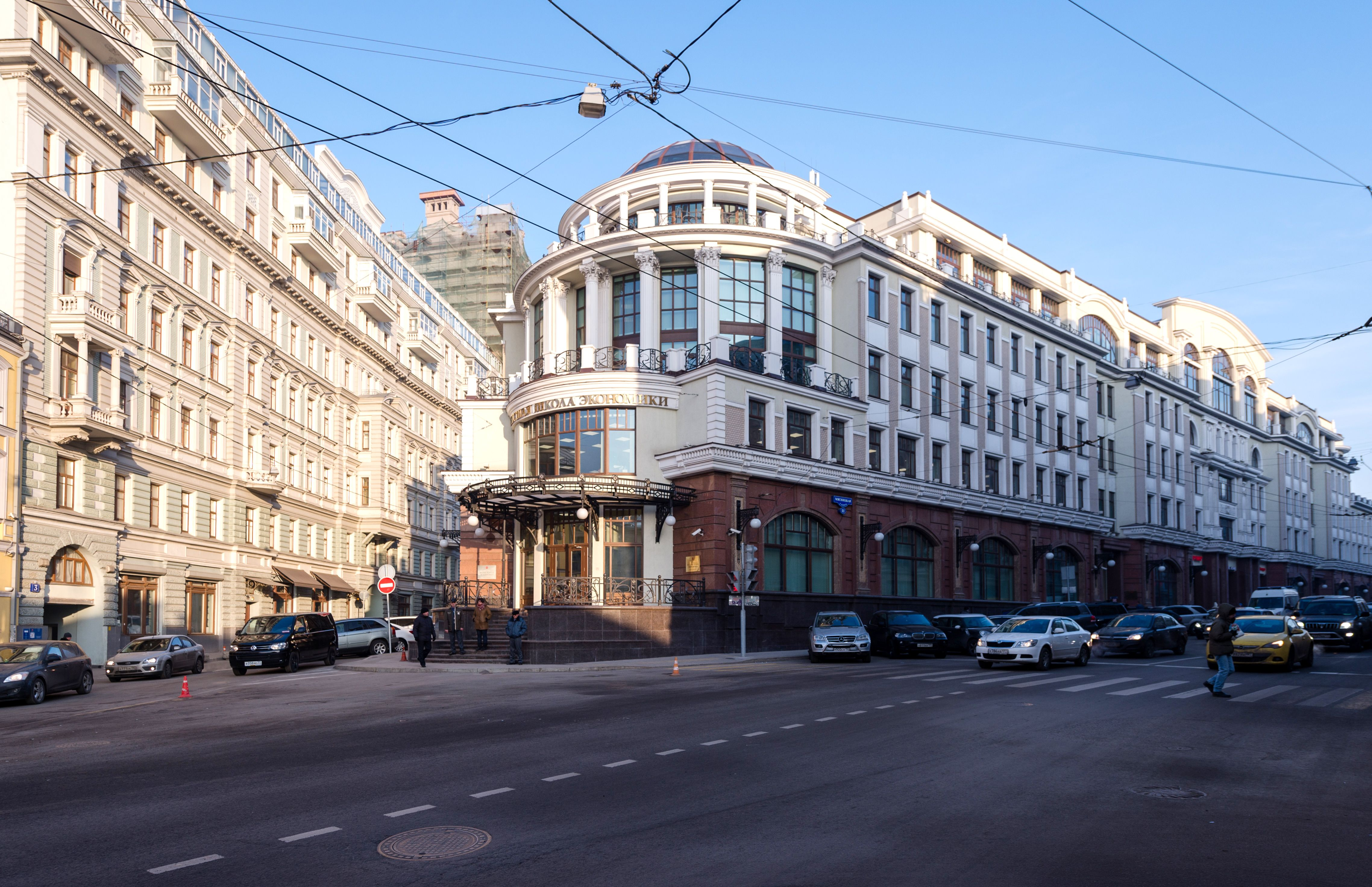
- Motto: Non scholae, sed vitae discimus
- Motto in English: "Not for the school but for life we study"
- Type: Public
- Established: 1992
- Affiliations: National Research University; Project 5-100
- Academic affiliations: BRICS Universities League; EUA (suspended); UNICA (suspended)
- Endowment: ₽1 093.83 million (US$14.8 million) (as of 31 December 2020)
- President: Alexander Shokhin
- Vice-president: Igor Agamirzian
- Rector: Nikita Anissimov
- Academic staff: c. 7,000
- Administrative staff: 1,870
- Students: above 52 000
- Postgraduates: 489
- Doctoral students: 724
- Location: Moscow (subsidiary campuses in Saint-Petersburg, Nizhny Novgorod and Perm), Russia
- Campus: Urban
- Academic term: Quarter
- Colors: Diamond blue and silver grey
- Mascot: Crow
- Website: www.hse.ru/en

University rankings

Global – Overall
- ARWU World: 701–800 (2023)
- QS World: =440 (2026)
- THE World: 401–500 (2024)
- USNWR Global: =561 (2023)

HSE University (Russian: «Высшая школа экономики», ВШЭ), officially the National Research University Higher School of Economics (Russian: Национальный исследовательский университет «Высшая школа экономики»), and sometimes colloquially known as Vishka, is a public research university founded in 1992 and headquartered in Moscow, Russia. Alongside its main campus in the capital, the university operates three regional campuses, in Saint Petersburg, Nizhny Novgorod, and Perm, as well as an online campus. The Lyceum at HSE University, also in Moscow, is affiliated with the institution.

HSE was the first educational institution in Russia to successfully introduce bachelor's and master's degrees, and it also took part in developing and implementing the Unified State Exam as part of the modernization of Russia's education and health care systems.

HSE offers education at every level, from a lyceum for secondary school students to postgraduate and MBA programs. Students can pursue training in a range of fields, including the social sciences, economics, the humanities, law, engineering, computer science, mathematics, physics, chemistry, biology and biotechnology, as well as in creative disciplines. University representatives also sit on the Civic Chamber of the Russian Federation and the Expert Council under the government of Russia.

== Administration ==
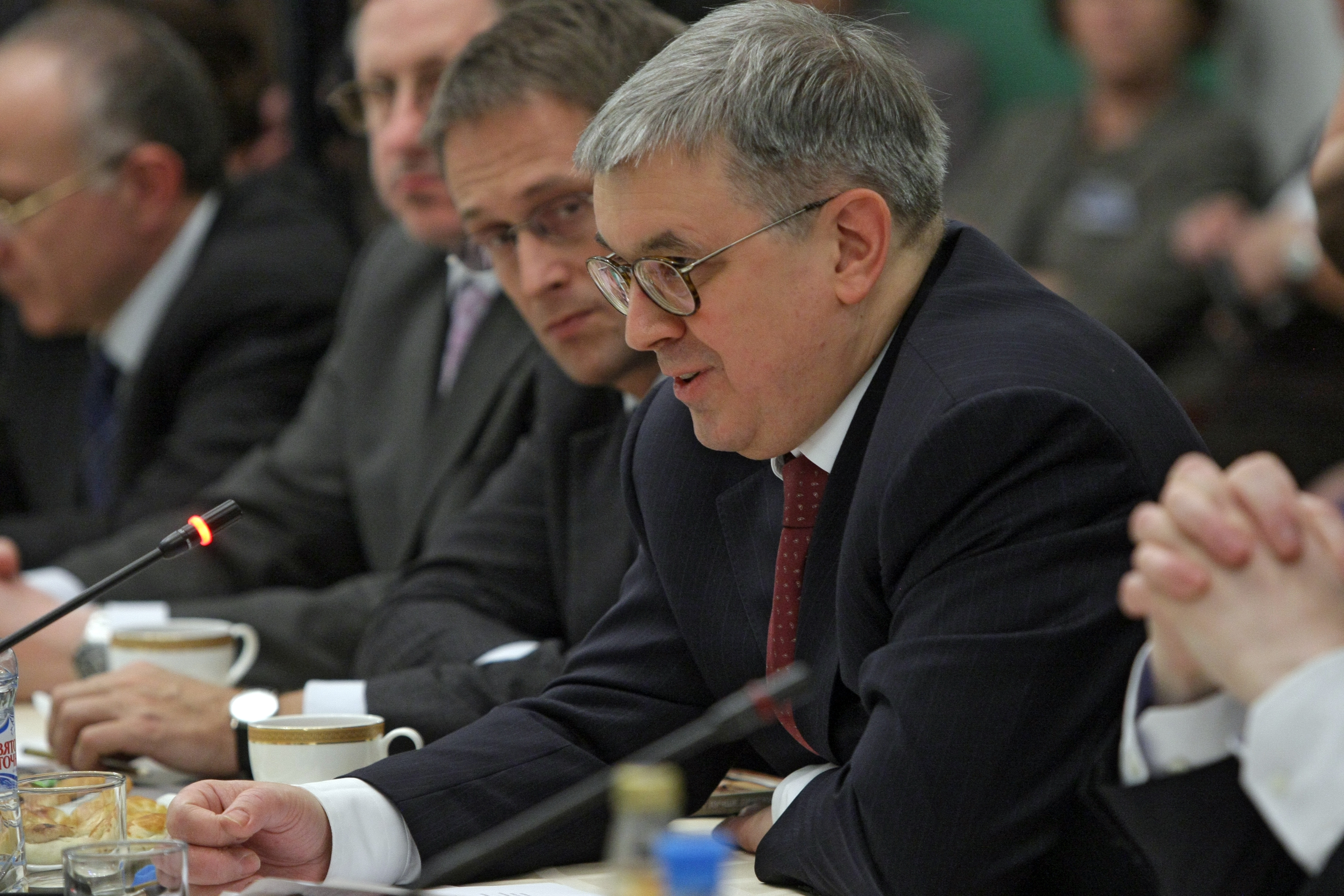
The first Rector Yaroslav Kuzminov, 2010

HSE University was established on 27 November 1992 by a decree from the Russian government. Since then, the university has been administered by a permanent rector, Yaroslav Kuzminov, who also participated in the founding of the university.

In July 2021, Yaroslav Kuzminov resigned. Nikita Anisimov became the new rector. Kuzminov was elected to the post of Academic Supervisor, which Yevgeny Yasin left for health reasons.

Prior to that, the former Minister of Economics Yevgeny Yasin had held the position of Academic Supervisor and represented the university in other academic organizations,, and University President Alexander Shokhin represented it in its interactions with governmental bodies. Economists Vadim Radaev, Lev Yakobson, and Alexander Shamrin have filled the positions of vice-rectors at HSE.

Members of various university councils include Russian politician Sergey Kiriyenko, Chairman of the State Duma Vyacheslav Volodin, the founder of "Sberbank" Herman Gref, the president of Renova Group Viktor Vekselberg, Russian billionaire technology entrepreneur Arkady Volozh, chairman of the management board of Otkritie FC Bank Mikhail Mikhailovich Zadornov, a major shareholder of the Russian gas company Novatek Leonid Mikhelson, philanthropist Vadim Moshkovich, as well as the businessman and political activist Mikhail Prokhorov.

- HSE Lyceum
- HSE Faculty of Mathematics
- HSE Faculty of Physics
- HSE Tikhonov Moscow Institute of Electronics and Mathematics (MIEM HSE)
  - School of Electronic Engineering
  - School of Computer Engineering
  - School of Applied Mathematics
- Faculty of Computer Science
  - School of Software Engineering
  - School of Data Analysis and Artificial Intelligence
  - Big Data and Information Retrieval School
- Faculty of Business and Management
  - School of Business Administration
  - School of Logistics
  - School of Business Informatics
  - Higher School of Business Informatics (in Russian)
  - Institute of Innovation Management
  - International Centre of Training in Logistics (in Russian)
  - Higher School of Project Management (in Russian)
  - Higher School of Marketing and Business Development (in Russian)
- Faculty of Law
  - Department of Civil Law (in Russian)
  - Department of Constitutional and Administrative Law (in Russian)
  - Department of International Public and Private Law (in Russian)
  - Department of Practical Law (in Russian)
  - Department of Judicial Power (in Russian)
  - Department of Theory of Law and Comparative Law (in Russian)
  - Department of Labour and Social Welfare Law (in Russian)
  - Department of Criminal Law (in Russian)
  - Joint Department with the Federal Anti-Monopoly Service (in Russian)
  - Department of Financial, Tax, and Customs Law (in Russian)
- Faculty of Humanities
  - School of History
  - School of Cultural Studies
  - School of Linguistics
  - School of Literary History and Theory
  - School of Philosophy
  - School of Foreign Languages
- Faculty of Social Sciences
  - School of Politics and Governance
  - School of Sociology
  - School of Psychology
  - Institute of Education
  - Institute of Demography
  - Public Policy Department
- Faculty of Communications, Media, and Design
  - School of Media
  - School of Integrated Communications
  - School of Art and Design
- Faculty of World Economy and International Affairs
  - School of World Economy
  - School of International Affairs
  - School of International Regional Studies
  - School of Asian Studies
- Faculty of Economic Studies
  - Department of Theoretical Economics
  - Department of Applied Economics
  - School of Finance
  - Department of Mathematics
  - Department of Statistics and Data Analysis
- International College of Economics and Finance
- Faculty of Urban and Regional Development
  - Vysokovsky Graduate School of Urbanism
- Faculty of Chemistry
- Faculty of Biology and Biotechnology
- Faculty of Geography and Geoinformation Technologies

Independent departments

- Department of Higher Mathematics
- Joint Department with Garage Museum of Contemporary Art
- Department of Physical Training (in Russian)
- Department of Innovation Management (in Russian)
- Department of Security Research (in Russian)
- Military Training Department (in Russian)

== History ==
=== Prerequisites for establishment ===
At the beginning of the 1990s, the state of education in the fields of economics and social science was poorly developed in Russian universities. One of the main causes of this state of affairs was the legacy of the communist system, a system that had led to the exile of many intellectuals, the absence of which would later end up limiting advancement in several academic fields of research. The transition from a centrally based economy to a market economy started in the USSR in the 1980s. Consequently, in 1992, Gaidar's government initiated a number of reforms that drastically increased the need for specialists familiar with the contemporary world economy to conduct analysis and run predictions. In 1992, the government enacted a law authorizing the creation of private universities. At that time, in Russia, 33 state universities specialized in sociology and economy. Reforming the existing conservative universities, including the Moscow State University, seemed like an ineffective solution. Thus, the government approved the idea to establish a new university with research priorities in socio-economic sciences.

At the beginning of the 1990s, we understood that the absence of Russian economic school and Russian financial education is a strategic problem for the country <...>. It was almost impossible to create such a system based on existing economic universities, thus, as it also happened to the Institute for the Economy in Transition period, the Higher School of Economics started from scratch.

— Yegor Gaidar

=== Establishment and formation ===
In many ways, HSE University was founded by the efforts of Yaroslav Kuzminov and Yevgeny Yasin. By the beginning of the 1990s, both of them taught economics at the Moscow State University wherein 1989 Kuzminov founded "alternative" (or non-communist) Department of Economics sponsored by the Soros Foundation. In 1991, together with economists Oleg Ananin and Rustem Nureev, Kuzminov and Yasin prepared a grant application for the European Union. The proposed project was drawn up for 100 million euro that aimed to provide "technical assistance in the field of economic education". The proposed project included about 30 projects, including the Gaidar Institute for Economic Policy.

HSE University was initially planned as a think tank for officials. It was supposed to promote reforms in Russia, to train economists, analysts, and teachers who would be able to work in the new conditions for the new government.

— Yevgeny Yasin

On 27 November 1992, Gaidar signed the government decree "On creation of the Higher School of Economics" (it was his last decree as the Deputy Prime Minister of the Russian Federation). HSE founders noted that they intentionally avoided the term "university" and instead choose "school" referring to the London School of Economics. The European Union and the Government of France immediately sponsored the project. Therefore, HSE University sent its scholars to study in the Netherlands and invited professors from the Sorbonne University and Erasmus Programme.

The missing library was offset by a rapidly created online resource system with training materials. Since the university deliberately avoided state education programs, it focused on translation of advanced foreign textbooks which formed the basis of education programs. University experts consulted with the government on socio-economic reforms, jurisprudence, and political science. For example, at the beginning of the 2000s, Kuzminov and Yasin participated in the creation of the "Strategy 2010" – social and economic development program initiated by German Gref and aimed at forming foundation for government policy.

=== Education system; rankings ===
In 2022 it was ranked #568 in Best Global Universities by U.S. News & World Report, and #881 by Center for World University Rankings, and in 2020 it was ranked in the #801-900 group in the Academic Ranking of World Universities (ARWU), also known as the Shanghai Ranking.

Global ranking	2021/22	2020/21	2019/20	2018/19	2017/18	2016/17	2015/16	2014/15
ShanghaiRanking's ARWU		801—900	901—1000	901—1000				
QS World University Rankings	305	298	322	343	382	411—420	501—550	501—550
THE World University Rankings		251—300	251—300	301—350	351—400	401—500		
QS Top 50 Under 50		31	38	38	48	51—60	81—90	
THE Young University Rankings		41	60	84	96			
U.S. News & World Report Best Global Universities			574	653	714			
Regional ranking	2019	2018	2017	2016	2015	2014		
QS University Rankings: BRICS		37	37	39	62	63	58	
QS Emerging Europe & Central Asia		17	23	25	35	31	37	
THE Emerging Economies University Rankings		18	32	48				
THE European University Ranking		124		201—250				

In September 1993, HSE University became the first university that introduced the Bologna education system in Russia. Thus, when Russia joined the Bologna Process in 1998, the Higher School of Economics already had certified graduates from the program – the first Master's graduation happened in 1995, while the Bachelor's took place the next year.

In 1997, HSE University and the London School of Economics (LSE) signed the agreement on establishing The International College of Economics and Finance (ICEF), that was later renamed to "International Institute of Economics and Finance". According to the regulations of the University of London, starting from the second year, students take classes in English. Upon the successful completion of requirements, they receive a double diploma issued by the University of London and the Higher School of Economics.

In 2001, the Ministry of Education initiated the project of the Unified State Exam (USE) which was developed together with the specialists from HSE. The USE is a series of exams that students must pass after graduating from school to apply to a university or professional college. Since 2009, the USE is the only form of graduation examination in schools. HSE was the first university in Russia to accept USE results as a main criteria for students enrolling. Thus, the university was able to set a high threshold and admit the most talented students from all over Russia.

In 2004, the first Academic Foundation was established to support university research and promote academic activities. A year later a group of research laboratories was opened and in 2006 HSE launched the Center for Fundamental Research to coordinate university research including government orders. The first international laboratories affiliated with the university were launched in 2010–2011.

By the beginning of the 2000s, universities in Russia were deprived of full state support and were forced to attract funds and investors on their own. At that time, HSE was already an influential think tank with more than 20% of its income earned by performing custom research. Besides the USE, HSE experts worked on administrative reforms and on "The Digital Russia Program". In August 2008, HSE University became directly subordinated to the Russian government with which it was working closely for the previous five years. Under the instructions of the President, the university initiated the development of the "Strategy 2020" program.

Ranking	Field/program	2021	2020	2019	2018	2017	2016	2015
Shanghai Ranking's Global Ranking of Academic Subjects	Sociology			51—75	51—75	51—75		
	Mathematics			76—100	76—100	101—150		
	Political Sciences			101—150	151—200	101—150		
	Economics			151—200	151—200	201—30		
	Management		301—400	401—500				
QS World University Rankings by Faculty	Social Sciences & Management	48	59	75	73	155	161	161
	Arts & Humanities	113	145	153	220	299	289	289
	Engineering & Technology	451—500	401–450	451—500				
THE World University Rankings by Subject	Business & Economics	126—150	94	101—125	101—125	101—125	83	
	Social Sciences	176—200	151—175	126—150	126—150	176—200		
	Arts & Humanities	201—250	176—200	201—250	201—250	176—200		
	Physical sciences	501—600	401—500	401—500	401—500	401—500		
	Psychology	176—200	151–175	151–175	151—175			
	Computer Science	401—500	301—400	301—400	301—400			
	Engineering & Technology	801—1000	601–800	601–800	601—800			
	Law	126—150						
QS World University Rankings by Subject	Sociology	50	51—100	51—100	51—100	101—150	151—200	
	Politics & International Studies	45	48	51—100	51—100	51—100	101—150	
	Economics & Econometrics	76	51—100	51—100	101—150	51—100	101—150	151—200
	Mathematics	95	101–150	101–150	101–150	151—200	251—300	
	Philosophy	101—150	101—150	101—150	101—150	151—200	151—200	151—200
	Accounting & Finance	101—150	101—150	151—200	101—150	151—200		
	Business & Management Studies	131	101—150	101—150	151—200	151—200	151—200	
	History	51—100	51—100	101—150	151—200	151—200		
	Linguistics	101—150	101—150	101—150	151—200	151—200		
	Law	101—150	151—200	151—200	201—250	201—250		
	Modern Languages	101—150	101—150	151—200	201—250			
	Computer Science & Information Systems	151–200	151–200	201–250	251—300	351—400		
	Education	64	101—150	101—150	251—300	201—250		

=== Recent years ===
Starting from the 2010s, the Ministry of Education initiated the process of university mergers. Consequently, the Moscow Institute of Electronics and Mathematics was included into the administrative structure of HSE University. Additionally in 2011, the HSE Lyceum was founded for high school students. The university would go on to open several more faculties, including: The Faculty of Communication, Media, and Design, Philology, and in 2014 (with support of the Yandex group) – the Faculty of Computer Science. The first admission to the Faculty of Physics took place in 2017. In 2018, the university opened the faculties of Chemistry, Biology and Biotechnology. In 2015, the Faculty of History was reorganized into the School of Historical Sciences; the School was headed by historian Alexander Kamensky (2015–2023) and since 2023 he has served as its academic supervisor.

In recent years (2019–2020) the heads of various faculties in agreement with each other decided to start the company of renaming their faculties. The corresponding decision was made by the HSE Academic Council as part of the HSE development programs for 2030, aimed at further increasing the university's global competitiveness.

The main reason for doing so is that originally HSE was primarily focused on Economic studies, but with constant rapid development a lot of new branches appeared. Thus, instead of Higher School of Economics Faculty of Management it will be named "Higher School of Business".

In 2010, a bronze bust of Yegor Gaidar was put up by private donations of the faculty in the university building Durasov's Palace.

In 2018, the rector of HSE University, Yaroslav Kuzminov, announced that all lectures will switch to on-line format in 2020s Kuzminov claims that traditional classes are ineffective - they are visited by only 15-17% of students. Instead of them, professeurs will create their own distant courses and interact with the audience in the distant format. The university believes, that this measure will help to increase the engagement of students into the education process.

Despite actively working for the government on various projects, the university had, until recently, positioned itself as a politically independent actor. Consequently, there have been incidents in the history of the university that caused public outcry. For instance, during the anti-government protests of 2009, many university students and lecturers attended rallies. After that, the HSE administration received a request from the Moscow police to expel students and to fire professors that took part in anti-government activities. However, the university refused to take the requested action elaborating on its decision with the phrase: "they [students and professors] are not forbidden from participating in politics".

In March 2011, the university organized debates on the Federal state law № 94 between Russian oppositionist Alexei Navalny and rector Kuzminov. Representatives of the Ministry of Economic Development were also present at the event.

In 2018–20, there were several incidents related to the "V Tochku" university talk show. For instance, after the press secretary for the President of Russia Dmitry Peskov gave a talk at the show discussing Navalny and some aspects of contemporary Russian state discourse, the recording of the speech was not published on the website as it usually happened with other talks. However, its full transcription was published on the BBC website. The Department of Media and Communications apologized to students who publicly protested against the case, calling it a manifestation of censorship.

In the recent years, the HSE has tried to distance itself from any political affiliations which was especially evident in the case of Yegor Zhukov, who was sentenced to three years of probation for unauthorized rioting against corruption among Moscow authorities.

Nikita Yuryevich Anisimov, Rector of the university, was suspended by the European University Association (EUA) following support for the 2022 Russian invasion of Ukraine by the Russian Union of Rectors (RUR) in March 2022, for being "diametrically opposed to the European values that they committed to when joining EUA”. In response to the Russian invasion, in March 2022 the Hamburg University of Applied Sciences, the Fletcher School at Tufts University, School of Slavonic and East European Studies at UCL, and Australian National University suspended their relationships with the university. In 2022, Ukraine sanctioned the HSE. The university also fired dozens of its professors who protested the invasion.

== Campuses ==
=== Nizhny Novgorod ===
The first regional campus was opened in Nizhny Novgorod in 1996. As of 2018, the campus had a population of 2700 students and 320 faculty. In terms of quality of budgetary admission, it ranks first among the universities in Nizhny Novgorod and takes the 19th position in the Russian ratings on the quality of education.

=== Saint Petersburg ===
The campus in Saint Petersburg was founded in 1997. As of 2018, the university in Saint Petersburg ranked third among the socio-economic universities of Russia and second in the city by rating of the average USE admission score of its entrants. As of 2019, the campus has a population of 5500 students and 485 faculty.

=== Perm ===
The third regional campus in Perm was also established in 1997. As of 2018, the university had around 2000 students and 120 faculty, and was rated 29th position in the Russian ranking on the quality of enrollment. In 2017, the Bachelor's program "Business informatics" took the fourth position in the same ranking). The campus collaborates with University of Essex and University of Évry Val d'Essonne to offer joint double-degrees with these institutions.

== Budget and real estate ==
In 2018, the university income amounted to 17.76 billion rubles (as of January 2020 this amounts to approximately 259,405,579 euros). The main sources of financing are state funds, private education services, fundamental and applied research, grants, donations, and others support.

Applied research commissioned by government agencies, private companies or international organizations constitute up to 40% of the university's income. Among regular clients are the Ministry of Education, the Moscow Department of Information Technology, the Ministry of Economic Development, Rosneft, Aeroflot, Gazprom, Russian Railways. In one academic year, the university completes on average around 300 projects. Other sources of support come from state subsidies and scientific grants, including international programs. For instance, for the Russian Academic Excellence Project alone, the state granted 950 million rubles (as of January 2020, this amounts to approximately 13,874,037 euro).

In 2007, HSE University co-founders established the HSE financial endowment – the nonprofit organization that accepts donations on behalf of the university and invests the received funds. The profit goes to the development of university projects. As of December 2018, the size of the endowment fund was 742.5 million rubles (as of January 2020, this amounts to approximately 10,845,942 euros).

== Activity ==
=== Education ===
In 1996, the Higher School of Economics received the status of a State university. Along with the focus on economics, the university emphasized mathematics. By 1999, the Faculty of Law, School of Public Administration, Schools of Political and Social Science had been launched. In 2002, in addition to already existing faculties, the university initiated programs focusing on business and political journalism, psychology, and business informatics.With government support, in 1996–1998 HSE opened new campuses in Russian regions. The first was opened in Nizhny Novgorod, then followed by campuses in Perm and St. Petersburg.

Initially, the university specialized in Economics, Management, and the Social and Human Sciences. Its oldest faculty is the Faculty of Economic Sciences. However, it later began to focus on Mathematics and Information Technology Programs. In 2017, HSE University launched degrees in Physics and Engineering Sciences, and even announced plans to open experimental laboratories at the institutes of the Russian Academy of Sciences. At the same time, the university launched the program "Data culture" aimed at the gradual implementation of digital literacy courses in all departmental units.

In 1999, HSE University divided the academic year into five modules instead of semesters. However, later, the university administration decided to reduce the number of modules to four. Starting from 1997, most of the exams have taken place in written form, while all the major student works are checked with plagiarism detection software.

Together with the modular system, the university introduced the «major/minor» education system, which means that students take main disciplines as their "major" and choose the block of additional programs subjected to individual choice as "minors". Altogether, this frees up time for students to prepare for seminars and individual projects. Assessment is carried out in accordance with the European Credit Transfer and Accumulation System. Correspondingly, every student has an individual GPA-based ranking that illustrates not only the academic performance, but also affects the size of the scholarship, gives a discount on tuition fees and the opportunity to participate in foreign internships, learn additional languages at the university and much more. Only 8% of students continue education in foreign universities, while 9% of all students came from abroad or participated in exchange programs. The university collaborates with more than 500 partner universities, mainly from Europe and Asia. As for 2019, HSE University had 50 double degree programs with Humboldt University of Berlin, Erasmus University Rotterdam, University of Leeds, London School of Economics, ESCP Europe, and other universities.

Since 2013, the Higher School of Economics (HSE University) has recorded courses for Coursera. According to the platform's official statistics, in 2018, HSE university was in top universities with the most recorded online courses. Altogether, it had posted around 100 courses, 25 of which were in English. As for 2017, HSE had the most recorded courses among all universities in the country. The average number of course participants is around 1 million people, 17% of which are listeners from the United States.

=== Science and innovations ===
As of 2018, the university was involved in the work of 37 international laboratories, three of which are located in regional campuses. They were established on the initiative and at the expense of the university as well as "Megagrants" from the government. Among academic supervisors was Nobel Laureate in Economics Eric Maskin (Laboratory of Decision Choice and Analysis), receiver of the Fields Medal Andrei Okounkov and other professors from foreign universities.

Besides research and development, and fundamental and applied research, the university has published the results of 15 large-scale continuously monitored studies, 11 statistics volumes, while additionally supporting national entrepreneurship, and starting from 2000, they have made filings to the Unified Archive of Economic and Sociological Data. According to the UBI Global World, in 2018, the university's business incubator was in the top 7 of world university incubators.

Since 1 February 2017, HSE has been on the list of 23 Russian universities that grant academic degrees. In addition, the university has 16 dissertation councils. As of 2018, HSE University publishes 26 scientific journals, 11 of which are indexed in Scopus, and two in WoS. The average citation index in Scopus increased from 0.5% in 2013 to 6.2% in 2016.

=== Social projects ===
In 2013, the HSE campus in Moscow launched the public project "University opened to the city" aimed at conducting a series of lectures, exhibitions, master classes, festivals, and educational activities for citizens. Following the example of the main campus, regional branches have also organized open lecture halls. For instance, in Saint Petersburg, a regular series of lectures takes place on the New Holland Island. In Perm, the HSE campus launched the summer lecture hall.

Other social projects include Master's programs for teachers, development of education standards, expert support for Russian universities, work in associations, and free citizens' consultations on social and judicial questions.

== Controversy ==
Despite its proximity to the government, the Higher School of Economics has repeatedly become the target of politically charged criticism. In 2014, at the United Russia congress, the university was called a "snake’s nest". Meanwhile, journalist Vladimir Solovyov spoke about HSE: "They are absolutely openly inciting things here, de facto preparing such a Maidan underground and are that very fifth column."

HSE has repeatedly appeared in political news. For example, in 2009, after a Dissenters' March, HSE management received a demand from the Moscow police to expel students and fire lecturers who participated in the march. The university refused, noting that "they are not prohibited from engaging in politics." In March 2011, a debate took place at HSE between Alexei Navalny and Yaroslav Kuzminov about the "public procurement law" 94-FZ in the presence of representatives of the Ministry of Economic Development.

In 2013, on the Moscow campus of the Higher School of Economics, searches were carried out at the department of the presidential adviser on human rights, Mikhail Fedotov, who participated in the examination of the second criminal case of YUKOS. At the beginning of 2014, the government delayed the consideration of Yaroslav Kuzminov’s candidacy for the position of rector, but in the end the contract was extended for another five years.

In 2018, Dmitry Peskov was invited to the university program "To the Point", but his speech remained unpublished. A transcript of the speech quickly became available on the BBC website. The students sent an open letter to the dean, referring to this incident as censorship that should not be tolerated in the journalism department. As a result, the Media Department issued a public apology to the students. The "To the Point" program received renewed media attention in May 2019, when Moscow City Duma candidate Lyubov Sobol spoke out about how the program was cancelled after she was invited to appear on air. Rector Yaroslav Kuzminov publicly commented on this decision, stating the non-political position of the university. Specialists who conducted political research began to leave the university. The Higher School of Economics has published an order to merge the Department of Political Science of the Faculty of Social Sciences with the Department of State and Municipal Administration into a new Department of Politics and Management from 1 September 2019.

In 2020, several teachers were fired from the university, including Yelena Lukyanova, Alexander Kynev, Kirill Martynov, and others. It is believed that the reason for their firing was their public criticism of that year's amendments to the Russian Constitution. Some of those fired filed a lawsuit demanding 550,000 rubles as compensation for moral damage, but the Basmanny Court of Moscow refused. In February 2021, the Higher School of Economics terminated the contract with guest teacher Anna Vellikok; the official reason for the termination was inability to conduct classes as scheduled due to her arrest for retweeting information about an uncoordinated rally on 23 January 2021. Despite a letter to management from former colleagues at the Faculty of Computer Science, Vellikok was not reinstated in her position, and the termination of the contract was not seen as "neither political persecution nor a violation of the employee's labor rights."

At the beginning of 2020, the HSE administration reprimanded Professor Oleg Matveychev for a post on Facebook, considering it unacceptable and containing motives of hostility and hatred. Matveychev wrote about citizens with liberal views as "liberal bastards," believing that "We need '37," referring to the Great Purge. Even Vladimir Zhirinovsky, the leader of the Liberal Democratic Party of Russia, responded to the professor’s calls, calling for Matveychev to be fired from the Higher School of Economics: "This man can be neither a political scientist nor a teacher."

== People ==
=== Faculty ===
Initially, HSE applied for grants to invite foreign scholars who, especially at the beginning of the university's history, had more expertise than local specialists. As of 2016, around 11% of the overall number of foreign specialists were professors with a PhD degree.

Due to collaborations with the Ministry of Economic Development, the university invited ministers of economics and politicians to teach classes and give lectures. In the 1990s, the average age of lecturers was 33 years old, by 2011 the number increased to 43 years old. Most of the young scholars came from the Russian Academy of Science and the Moscow State University. HSE has a competitive system for searching for specialists. In the 1990s, due to a generally low salary, most of the professors had several jobs. Thus, HSE University introduced the "effective contract" – a financial system to encourage professors to consider the Higher School of Economics as a primary workplace. Those who have worked at the university for a long time are granted a status of "honoured professor".

=== Graduates ===
HSE University ranked high in graduate employment rates. In 2016, The Future Today put HSE University with the top Russian universities whose graduates are the most vacant in the market with a 85% employment rate. The survey inside the university also showed that 93% of graduates are employed within the first year after graduation. Some of them take freelance jobs or continue their education.

Among graduates of HSE are Maxim Oreshkin who would later be appointed to the position of Minister of Economic Development of the Russian Federation, and Konstantin Noskov who would become the Minister of Digital Development, Telecommunications and Mass Media of the Russian Federation. Vladimir Kiriyenko is a business executive and media manager who is the CEO of VK, a popular Russian social networking service.
