= Rustem Nureev =

Russian scientist (1950–2023)

- Born: 13 May 1950; Moscow
- Died: 12 April 2023 (aged 72)
- Education: Doctor of Economics
- Alma mater: MSU Faculty of Economics; Lyceum "Second school"
- Occupation: Economist, university teacher
- Employer: Higher School of Economics; Plekhanov Russian University of Economics
- Awards: Order of Friendship (2013); Honoured Higher education employee of the Russian Federation (2000); Medal "In Commemoration of the 850th Anniversary of Moscow" (1997)
- Website: rustem-nureev.ru

Rustem M. Nureev (Russian: Рустем Махмутович Нуреев; 13 May 1950 – 12 April 2023) was a Soviet and Russian scientist and economist. Doctor of Sciences in Economics (1990), professor at the Higher School of Economics and Financial University under the Government of the Russian Federation. He was the first vice chancellor of the Higher School of Economics. He was also Principal Researcher at the Institute of Economics of the Russian Academy of Sciences.

In 1967 he entered and in 1972 he graduated from the Moscow State University, Faculty of Economics.

From 1972 to 1975, he was a graduate student at the MSU Faculty of Economics.

Then he worked at the MSU. Docent (1983). In 1991, he received the title of professor.

He was one of the organizers of the Higher School of Economics, and became its first vice chancellor. He taught at the Plekhanov Russian University of Economics.

He was a member of the Editorial Board of the Voprosy Ekonomiki.

== Honors and awards ==
- Order of Friendship (2013)
- Honorary Professor of the National Metallurgical Academy of Ukraine (2012)
- Honorary Professor of the Ural State Academy of Architecture and Arts (2012)
- Honorary Doctor of Donetsk Technical University (2008)
