= HSE Faculty of Economic Sciences =

Russian institute

The Faculty of Economic Sciences
Established:	1993
Type:	State University
Dean:	Sergey E. Pekarski
Students:	3000
Location:	Moscow
Country:	Russia
Website:	Faculty of Economic Sciences

The Faculty of Economic Sciences at the National Research University Higher School of Economics (Russian: Факультет экономических наук Национальный исследовательский университет «Высшая Школа Экономики») is the oldest faculty of the university which was founded in 1993, aiming at providing education in Economics to future managers and analysts for commercial enterprises, governmental bodies, research centres, as well as the staff of higher education institutions. There are about 3000 students and 315 professors and lecturers at the faculty.

Starting from its foundation the Faculty of Economics has cooperated with French universities to develop dual degree programmes for master's students in Economics (University of Paris-I, Pantheon-Sorbonne). Upon completion of one year of studies in France and having defended the Master's thesis both in France and in Russia the students receive two diplomas: the HSE Master's diploma and the French national diploma - DEA. In December 2005 new conventions between the HSE and the French universities were signed in the new format of Master in Economics programmes adopted by France.

Ten years’ cooperation of the HSE with Erasmus University, Rotterdam gives the HSE students an opportunity to obtain a second Diploma along with the Russian master's degree.

In 2001 the HSE and Humboldt University launched a joint programme for master's degree students. The programme offers an opportunity to obtain two degrees: Master of Arts in Economics and Management Science from Humboldt University in Berlin and the master's degree from the Higher School of Economics.

== Graduate programs ==
- Strategic Corporate Finance (in English)
- Economics and Economics Policy (in English)
- Master in Business Analytics (online, in English)
- Economic Analysis (online)
- Statistical Modelling and Actuarial Science
- Agrarian Economics
- Statistical Analysis in Economics
- Financial Markets and Institutions
- Corporate Finance
- Financial Engineering

== Deans ==
- Grigory Kantorovich - the dean of master’s programmes 1994 - 1999.
- Yuri Sharaev - the dean of bachelor’s programmes 1993 - 1995.
- Tatyana Kravchenko - the dean of bachelor’s programmes since 1995 and the dean of the Faculty of Economics, 1996 - 2000.
- Vladimir Avtonomov - the dean of the Faculty of Economics 2000 - 2011.
- Oleg Zamulin - the dean of the Faculty of Economics 2011 - 2015 and the dean of the Faculty of Economic Sciences 2015 - 2019.
- Sergey Pekarski - the dean of the Faculty of Economic Sciences 2019–present
