= International College of Economics and Finance =

Coordinates: 55.7545°N 37.6486°E

- Motto: Multum in parvo "The great in the small"
- Established: 1997
- Location: Moscow, Russia
Colours
- Website: https://icef.hse.ru/en/

The International College of Economics and Finance (ICEF) is an autonomous department within the Higher School of Economics (HSE), a national research university in Moscow, Russia. The ICEF was founded in 1997 as a collaboration between the HSE and the London School of Economics (LSE). It is an affiliate centre of the University of London International Programmes. The college offers bachelor's and master's degrees with international recognition.

== History ==
The ICEF was founded in 1997. The following year, the first group of ICEF students enrolled in Banking and Finance courses at the University of London. In 1999, courses in Economics and Management are offered.

In 2001, the first Russian graduates were recognized. Also in 2002, the ICEF's research programme is opened. In 2003, the ICEF offered courses in Economics, modelled on the basic curriculum at the LSE. In 2004, the ICEF asked for expressions of interest from qualified international lecturers. In 2005, the completion rate at the college was 60 percent. The Masters of Science degree in Financial Economics was made available at ICEF in September 2007. At this time, the college moved to a new premises on the NRU – HSE campus at Pokrovsky Boulevard. In 2008, the European Diploma Supplement became available to ICEF graduates. In 2009, the ICEF became an affiliate centre of the University of London International Programmes.

In 2010, the International Research Laboratory in Financial Economics was opened at the ICEF. The following year, the Laboratory held the inaugural International Moscow Finance Conference. In 2013, courses in Mathematics and Economics were offered using the curriculum of the University of London and the college awarded state scholarships for the ICEF masters' course.

== Enrolment ==
The admission of students is based on the results of the NRU – HSE entrance examinations. Students apply for admission to the LSE international programme at the end of their first year at the ICEF. To enter the University of London's International Programme the student must pass both the NRU – HSE examinations and the international examinations, the Advanced Placement Exams in economics, calculus, statistics and the IELTS. In each year of study, ICEF students must pass examinations in the Russian programme and in the University of London International Programme. The ICEF's integrated curriculum leads to a double degree. Student fees are calculated according to a student's results.

=== Double degree programme ===
The ICEF Bachelor of Science is a four-year degree. Tuition is mainly given in English. The ICEF course work includes subjects of the University of London International Programmes and those of the NRU – HSE. The University of London International Programme, beginning in the second year of study, requires a specialisation in Banking and Finance, Economics and Management, Economics and Finance, Economics, Accounting and Finance, or Mathematics and Economics.

== Research ==
ICEF faculty members conduct academic research in areas of modern economics, including macroeconomics, economic theory, corporate finance, financial econometrics, industrial organization, labor economics, law and economics, experimental economics, international economics, development economics.
