= State University of Education =

University in Moscow, Russia

- Государственный университет просвещения
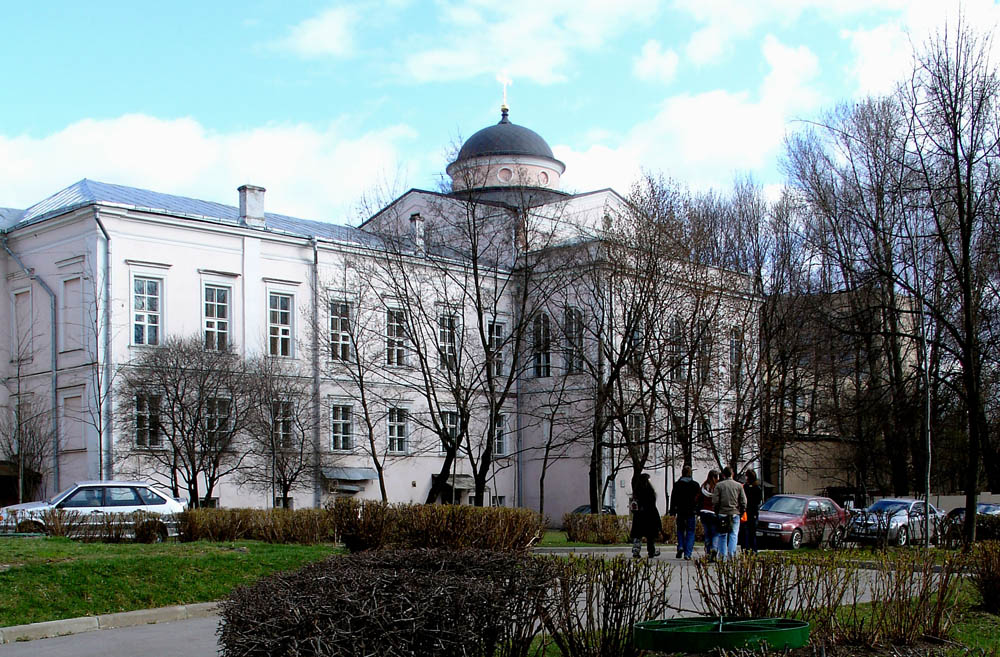
- Former names: Krupskaya Moscow Regional Pedagogical Institute, Moscow Pedagogical University, Moscow State Regional Pedagogical University
- Type: Public
- Established: 1921
- Location: Moscow; 55°53′47″N 37°42′56″E
- Campus: Urban
- Nickname: TvGU
- Website: guppros.ru/en

The State University of Education SUE (Russian: Государственный университет просвещения) is a higher education institution in Moscow and the Moscow Oblast. It was founded in 1931.

== History ==
In 1826, the estate, which now houses the main building of the university, was transferred to the "House of Industry for the Education of Poor Girls", which served as an educational institution for young girls from low-income families and orphans; they were taught here until the age of 20. In 1847, on the site of the House of Industry, in memory of Elizaveta Alekseyevna, the Elizavetinsky School was opened, which provided training for girls. The Elizavetinsky School (later the Institute) taught daughters of senior officers and officials no higher than titular counselors free of charge; for the rest, education was provided on a fee-paying basis.

In 1917, a reform was carried out, which was marked by the opening of the Moscow Regional Pedagogical College. It existed until 1930 and served as a provider of teachers for Moscow and the surrounding regions. In 1931, the technical school was transformed into the Krupskaya Moscow Regional Pedagogical Institute and from 1957 to 1991.

In 1991 the Krupskaya Moscow Regional Pedagogical Institute was transformed into Moscow Pedagogical University .

Since 2002, the university was transformed into Moscow Region State University (MGOU). In 2022, more than 10 thousand students were studying in the university.

On September 29, 2022, MGOU was transferred to federal ownership under the jurisdiction of the Ministry of Education and on November 21 of the same year it was renamed the Federal State Budgetary Educational Institution of Higher Professional Education "Moscow State Regional Pedagogical University" (MGOU).

On February 14, 2023, by order of the Ministry of Education of Russia No. 94, the Federal State Budgetary Educational Institution of Higher Education "Moscow State Regional Pedagogical University" was renamed into the Federal State Budgetary Educational Institution of Higher Education "Federal State University of Education" SUE.
