= Data culture =

Data culture is the principle established in the process of social practice in both public and Private sectors which requires all staffs and decision-makers to focus on the information conveyed by the existing data, and make decisions and changes according to these results instead of leading the development of the company based on experience in the particular field.

These data might include but are not limited to: general economical or Social Trends in the market, sales volume of products, or even performance of staffs pointing to their efficiency and productivity. Despite the business field, data culture is also applied in the social infrastructure system, such as Urban planning projects, to impact the process of data production and data practices of daily usage, such as Smart City programs.

In general, to build data culture, the departments and organizations have to let the data talk itself, and trust the steering of statistics. Being successful as a data-driven entity requires the active participation of all staffs involved in an organization, therefore open access to data is significant in the process.

== History ==
The idea of data culture has been under the spotlight of business field since the beginning of the 21st century, and is gaining popularity in recent years. Although first introduced in a scientific approach, the idea is now associated with both the science field and social sectors.

- In 2000, Geoffrey C. Bowker conveyed the idea of "local data culture" in his academic paper in terms of biodiversity.
- In 2014, Microsoft made a series of announcements including their intention to build data culture into everyday life through their services including Office 365, Azure and SQL Server.
- In 2015, Microsoft organized a series of workshops about data culture in alliance with Hortonworks and KPMG UK, offering data analysts and other professional working in the field of Big data an opportunity to understand the data culture of the company and help them build their own data culture in private sectors.
- The Data Power Conference 2017 was held in Canada at Carleton University, Ottawa, 22–23 June 2017.

== Components and roles ==
=== Participants ===
Participants are both producers of data and people who can contribute to the data culture by making influential changes. In the building process of data culture in a particular entity, employees at different levels are all supposed to obtain the ability of illustrating their works with relative statistics. This includes but is not limited to the goal of their job, the purpose of a specific task, and solutions they could bring up according to problems pointed out by data. Also, participants are allowed to make decisions within the section they take charge of, and experience changes happened due to their innovations.

=== Data scientists ===
Data analysts serve as an important part in the establishment of a data culture, as they often receive first-hand material and raw data, and the way they connect all the components together can determine the efficiency of communication between ordinary participants and decision-makers. Also, they are responsible for the analysis of information conveyed by the data. Having data scientists in each specific section of a company would be an ideal situation for a data-driven entity, therefore guaranteeing data access whenever needed.

=== Decision-makers ===
Decision-makers are those who apply changes and determine the direction of development in a company. In this case, they would make important decisions according to the trends and information highlighted by the data produced either in their own companies internally or statistics of the target market they want their corporations to aim at. Also, to build a data culture, decision makers have to emphasize their intention of requiring data analyses, therefore driving the motivation of staffs to deal with raw materials.

== Data-driven companies ==
=== Microsoft ===
The Microsoft team, under the management of Satya Nadella, depends on data to drive both major market decisions and their daily behaviors. Microsoft focuses on data visualization and Advocates that participants and employees should have the right to access the company's data. The company uses tools such as Power BI to have individual workers get involved and contribute to the future of the company.

=== Capita ===
Capita is a British agency that assists clients in both government departments and enterprises to understand themselves better, using advanced techniques of data analysis. Established in 1984, they advocate their clients to build their own data culture with relative database in their own field of career.

=== Socrata ===
Socrata is a US-based company which serves both public sectors and the civil society. They assist companies and organizations reach open data from the federal government to either improve the working progress of the government or assist social groups that are lack of resources. Their core value is tied to open data and they tend to focus on corporations which are in need of funding to process data analysis. The cloud-based service they provide allow government departments to communicate with the public through publishing their official data.

=== Data culture ===
Data culture is a German company (datenkultur GmbH) which serves business intelligence products and services. It was founded in 2003 and is active in building company data culture since 2006. The technical services are based on Microsoft products like SQL Server data warehouse and Power BI, but the BI strategic services are not directly connected to a product line. The goal is to help controlling employees or board member to use the existing data more effective and efficient. The necessary tools are based on the business needs and not the other way around.

== Counter opinions ==
=== Data privacy ===
Some companies feel that it is important to keep the data private at the executive level. Although it is possible for all staff in a company to produce and process the data together, it is restricted for data to be free from the approach of participants at the elementary level. Some companies use the idea of Data warehouse, a system that limits access to data. Only people in charge could access the data, and other people requiring access need to go through the assessment of warehouse staff.

=== Efficiency ===
As long as data bureaucracy is convenient for open access to Databases, the large number of users might slow down the speed of processing in a particular system. Also, it might be difficult for users to search for what they want if the data bureaucracy system is not facilitated with proper tools. In this case, Data Warehouse would be more efficient for users who are not able to perform professionally when they seek for data.

=== Rationalism ===
A rational method of building or expanding an enterprise is an opposite approach to an empirical one. The decisions of rationalists are often evaluated according to their personal spirit and their existing cognition of the world. In terms of this approach, decision-makers depend on logic rather than social phenomena and phenomena appearing at the front line of an industry to make changes. The fact that decision-making process is not limited to the executive team anymore lead to the hesitation of some people on the management level, therefore they refuse to develop data culture.

== See also ==
- Data activism
- Data analysis
- Data governance
- Data science
- Open data
- Research Data Alliance
