= Kuznetsov =

Kuznetsov, Kuznyetsov, Kuznetsoff or Kouznetsov (Russian: Кузнецов; feminine: Kuznetsova, Russian: Кузнецова) is the third most common Russian surname, an equivalent of the English "Smith" (derived from a Russian word kuznets (Russian: кузнец) that means 'blacksmith').

== Men ==
- Aleksandr Kuznetsov (disambiguation), several people
- Aleksey Kuznetsov (disambiguation), several people

=== Artists and entertainers ===
- Aleksey Alekseevich Kuznetsov (born 1941), Soviet/Russian jazz guitarist and composer
- Anatoly Borisovich Kuznetsov (1930–2014), Soviet/Russian actor
- Anatoly Vasilievich Kuznetsov (1929–1979), Soviet writer, author of Babi Yar
- I. Kuznetsov, Russian soloist with the Alexandrov Ensemble
- Ivan Sergeyevich Kuznetsov (1867–1942), Russian architect
- Mikhail Kuznetsov (actor) (1918–1986), Soviet actor
- Nikolai Dmitriyevich Kuznetsov (1850–1929), Ukrainian portrait painter
- Pavel Varfolomevich Kuznetsov (1878–1968), Russian painter
- Sergey Kuznetsov, (born 1966), Russian writer
- Yury Kuznetsov, (born 1946), Russian actor
- Andy Kusnetzoff (born 1970), Argentine TV and radio personality

=== In sports ===
- Alex Kuznetsov (born 1987), Ukrainian-American male tennis player
- Andrey Kuznetsov (born 1991), Russian tennis player
- Artur Kuznetsov (Russian footballer) (born 1972)
- Artur Kuznetsov (Ukrainian footballer) (born 1995)
- Dmitri Kuznetsov (footballer born 1965), association football coach and former player
- Dmitri Anatolyevich Kuznetsov (born 1972), retired Russian footballer
- Evgeny Kuznetsov (born 1992), Russian ice hockey player
- Evgeny Kuznetsov (diver) (born 1990), Russian diver
- Maxim Kuznetsov (born 1977), Russian ice hockey player
- Mikhail Kuznetsov (figure skater) (born 1988), Russian figure skater
- Mikhail Kuznetsov (triathlete) (born 1971), Kazakhstani triathlete
- Oleh Kuznetsov (born 1963), Ukrainian footballer and manager
- Ruslan Kuznetsov (born 1980), Russian para-cyclist
- Pavel Kuznetsov (weightlifter), (born 1961), Russian weightlifter
- Syarhey Kuznyatsow, (born 1979), Belarusian footballer
- Serhiy Kuznetsov (footballer born 1982), Ukrainian footballer
- Vasili Kuznetsov (athlete) (1932–2001), Soviet decathlete
- Vasili Kuznetsov (footballer) (born 1978), Russian footballer
- Viktor Kuznyetsov (athlete) (born 1986), Ukrainian athlete
- Viktor Kuznetsov (footballer, born 1949) (born 1949), Soviet international footballer
- Viktor Kuznetsov (swimmer) (born 1961), Soviet backstroke swimmer
- Vitali Kuznetsov (footballer) (born 1986), Russian footballer
- Vitali Kuznetsov (judoka) (1941–2011), Soviet judoka
- Yan Kuznetsov (born 2002), Russian ice hockey player

=== In politics ===
- Alexey Kuznetsov (1905–1950), Soviet politician
- Eduard Kuznetsov (dissident) (1939–2024), Jewish Soviet dissident and human rights activist
- Eduard Kuznetsov (politician) (born 1967), Russian politician
- Vasili Kuznetsov (politician) (1901–1990), Soviet politician
- Vyacheslav Nikolayevich Kuznetsov (born 1947), Belarusian politician

=== In the military ===
- Fyodor Kuznetsov (1898–1961), Soviet military leader
- Konstantin Kuznetsov (1902–1977), Soviet naval officer
- Nikolai Gerasimovich Kuznetsov (1904–1974), Admiral of the Fleet of the Soviet Union
- Nikolai Ivanovich Kuznetsov (1911–1944), Soviet intelligence agent and partisan
- Pavel Grigoryevich Kuznetsov (1901–1982), Soviet general
- Vasily Kuznetsov (general) (1894–1964), Soviet military leader and Hero of the Soviet Union
- Yuri Viktorovich Kuznetsov (1946–2020), Soviet military leader and Hero of the Soviet Union

=== In science and engineering ===
- Alexander Kuznetsov (mathematician) (born 1973), Russian mathematician
- Arseniy Kuznetsov (born 1979), Russian physicist
- Oleg Kuznetsov (born 1938), Russian geophysicist
- Pobisk Kuznetsov (1924–2000), Soviet Russian philosopher and scientist
- Nikolai Dmitriyevich Kuznetsov (1911–1995), Soviet aerospace engineer and the chief of the Kuznetsov Design Bureau
- Nikolai Yakovlevich Kuznetsov (1873–1948), Russian entomologist, paleoentomologist and physiologist
- Nikolay V. Kuznetsov (born 1979), Russian scientist, specialist in nonlinear dynamics and control theory
- Yuri A. Kuznetsov, Russian-American mathematician

=== In other areas ===
- Boris Kuznetsov (lawyer) (born 1944), Russian lawyer
- Oleg Kuznetsov (1969–2000), Soviet serial killer
- Pyotr Kuznetsov (born 1964), Russian religious leader
- Andrei Kuznetsov, oldest living Finn at the time of his death

== Women ==
=== Artists and entertainers ===
- Agniya Kuznetsova (born 1985), Russian theatre and film actress
- Dina Kuznetsova, American lyric dramatic operatic soprano
- Lyubov Kuznetsova (1928–2008), Russian calligrapher and font designer
- Maria Kouznetsova (violinist) (born 1991), Russian violinist
- Maria Kuznetsova (novelist), Ukrainian American novelist
- Mariya Kuznetsova (born 1950), Russian actress in 2001 film Taurus
- Mariya Kuznetsova (singer) (1880–1966), Russian opera singer and dancer
- Marina Kuznetsova (1925–1996), Soviet stage and film actress
- Vera Kuznetsova (1907–1994) was a Russian film actress

=== In sports ===
- Alesya Kuznetsova (born 1992), Russian judoka
- Elena Kuznetsova (born 1982), Uzbekistani sport shooter
- Evgeniya Kuznetsova (born 1980), former Olympic gymnast who competed for Russia and later Bulgaria
- Galyna Kuznetsova (born 1960), Ukrainian Paralympic volleyball player
- Maria Kuznetsova (wrestler) (born 1997), Russian wrestler
- Nataliya Kuznetsova (born 1991), Russian powerlifter and bodybuilder
- Nataliya Kuznetsova-Lobanova (1947–1998), a Russian diver
- Olga Kuznetsova (runner) (born 1967), Russian middle distance runner
- Olga Kuznetsova (sport shooter) (born 1968), Russian sport shooter
- Polina Kuznetsova (born 1987), Russian handball player
- Svetlana Kuznetsova (born 1985), Russian tennis player
- Svetlana Kuznetsova (basketball) (born 1965), Russian basketball player
- Svetlana Kuznetsova (cyclist) (born 1995), Russian cyclist
- Sofya Kuznetsova, Russian volleyball player
- Yelena Kuznetsova (born 1977), Kazakhstani race walker
- Yevgeniya Kuznetsova (athlete) (born 1936), Soviet athlete, competed in discus throwing in 1960 and 1964 Olympics

=== In politics ===
- Anna Kuznetsova (born 1982), Russian human rights activist
- Irina Davydovna Kuznetsova (1923–?), Soviet-Latvian politician

=== In science and engineering ===
- Irina Levshakova (née Kuznetsova) (1959–2016), Soviet/Russian paleontologist and artist
- Valentina Kuznetsova (1937–2010), Soviet and Russian polar researcher and skier

=== In the military ===
- Mariya Kuznetsova (pilot) (1918–1990), Soviet fighter pilot

=== In other areas ===
- Inna Kuznetsova (born 1968), CEO of ToolsGroup
- Tatyana Kuznetsova (1941–2018), Soviet cosmonaut

== See also ==
- 2233 Kuznetsov, an asteroid named for Nikolai Ivanovich Kuznetsov (1911–1944)
- Kuznetsov Design Bureau, a Soviet/Russian aircraft engine design bureau
- Admiral Kuznetsov class aircraft carrier
  - Russian aircraft carrier Admiral Kuznetsov
