= Armenian jazz =

Music genre or scene

Armenian jazz refers to jazz music composed by Armenian musicians, sometimes combined with traditional Armenian elements.

== History ==
=== 1930s–1940s: Early beginnings ===
The roots of Armenian jazz trace back to 1936, when composer and trumpeter Tsolak Vardazaryan formed Yerevan's first jazz band. Two years later, in 1938, composer Artemi Ayvazyan founded the Armenian State Jazz Orchestra, which quickly became one of the leading jazz orchestras of the Soviet Union. During World War II, Soviet Armenian authorities sent the orchestra to hold concerts for the Red Army. The orchestra's first drummer, Robert Yolchyan, became an important artist of Soviet and Armenian jazz, developing his own style over time and continuing to play and give master-classes until his death in 2001.

=== 1940s–1950s: Post-World War II jazz ===
Following World War II, a complete ban was imposed on jazz music until the death of Joseph Stalin in 1953. Nikita Khruschev’s De-Stalinization policies lifted restrictions throughout the USSR. In 1954, Konstantin Orbelyan organized an Estrada quintet for Armenian Radio. Other jazz bands were founded in Nairi Cinema, Yerevan Park of Communars, and others.

=== 1960s–1991: The Khrushchev Thaw and emergence of new artists ===
The early 1960s, known as the Khrushchev Thaw, saw a decrease in censorship. However, jazz remained a topic of disagreement throughout the Soviet republics. In his 1963 Declaration on Music in Soviet Society, Khrushchev assured that there would be no bans on music, though he criticized certain kinds of jazz, referring to some as cacophony. While jazz was no longer banned, restrictions remained, especially in terms of access to Western jazz musicians and literature.

Internationally, prominent jazz musicians such as giants were drawn to the music of Soviet-Armenian composer Aram Khachaturian. Bill Evans introduced the music of Khachaturian to Miles Davis. Davis, in his autobiography, mentioned that "I had been listening to him and what intrigued me about him were all those different scales he used". This influence of Armenian classical and folk music on jazz would continue to evolve in the decades that followed.

During this period, numerous jazz bands and ensembles began to emerge. In 1963, while still a student at Yerevan Brusov State University, jazz pianist Levon Malkhasyan founded the first small jazz band in Yerevan, the Levon Malkhasyan Trio, along with Armen Tutunjyan ("Chico") and Arthur Abrahamyan. In 1966, young composer Martin Vardazaryan founded the Estrada Orchestra, renamed in the 1970s as the Estrada Symphonic Orchestra under the direction of Melik Mavisakalyan and Yervand Yerznkyan. Then Stepan Shakaryan founded the jazz sextet Radio, and jazz trios were founded by David Azaryan and Artashes Kartalyan. Artists such as Datevik Hovanesian, often referred to as "The First Lady of Jazz of the Soviet Union", contributed to the integration of Armenian folk music and jazz into mainstream listening. In the early 1970s, the first jazz-rock fusion group Fresco, later renamed Tsiatsan, was formed in Yerevan, which operated at the Mergelyan Institute. The group played its own compositions under the leadership of Tigran Abramjan - lead guitar, Vardan Asatryan - bass and Grigor Avakyan - percussion, the Mirzoyan brothers - trumpet and saxophone. The group was managed by Georgy Minasyan and collaborated with Ervand Erznkyan and David Azaryan.

=== 1991–present: Post-Soviet developments ===
In 1998, Malkhas become one of the initiators of the Yerevan International Jazz Festival.

In 2009 Garik Saribekyan founded the Nuance Jazz Band, an ethnic jazz sextet.

One of the most internationally recognized contemporary Armenian jazz musicians is Tigran Hamasyan, a pianist known for his fusion of Armenian folk music with jazz and other genres, such as progressive rock.

== Notable Armenian jazz musicians ==
- Armen “Chico” Tutunjyan
- Armen Hyusnunts – saxophonist
- Armen Martirosyan – conductor and pianist
- Arto Tunçboyacıyan – multi-instrumentalist and singer
- Artemi Ayvazyan – composer and conductor
- Datevik Hovanesian – singer
- Georgy Garanian – saxophonist, bandleader and composer
- Konstantin Orbelyan – pianist and composer
- Levon Malkhasyan – composer and pianist
- Tigran Hamasyan – composer and pianist
- Vahagn Hayrapetyan – pianist, singer and composer
- Vardan Ovsepian – pianist

== See also ==
- Armenian music
- Russian jazz
