= Sergey Kuznetsov =

Sergei Kuznetsov (Russian: Серге́й Кузнецо́в [sʲɪrˈɡʲej kʊznʲɪˈtsof]; Ukrainian: Сергiй Кузнецов, romanized: Serhij Kuznecov [serˈɦij kʊzneˈtsɔu̯]; Belarusian: Сяргей Кузняцоў, romanized: Siarhiej Kuzniacow [sʲarˈɣʲɛj kuzʲnʲaˈt͡sɔw]; Kazakh: Sergei Kuznetsov) may refer to:

== Sports ==
- Sergey Kuznetsov (athlete) (1918-2010), Soviet Olympic decathlete
- Serhiy Kuznetsov (footballer, born 1950), Soviet international footballer with FC Zorya Luhansk, FC Dynamo Kyiv, FC Zenit Leningrad and FC SKA Rostov-on-Don
- Sergey Kuznetsov (footballer, born 1960), Soviet and Russian footballer with FC Dynamo Moscow, FC Zenit St. Petersburg and FC Asmaral Moscow, Soviet champion in 1984
- Serhiy Kuznetsov (footballer, born 1963), Soviet and Ukrainian footballer with FC Metalist Kharkiv, FC Chornomorets Odesa, FC Metalurh Zaporizhya, Ferencváros and FC KAMAZ Naberezhnye Chelny
- Sergey Kuznetsov (footballer, born 1966), Soviet and Russian footballer with FC SKA Rostov-on-Don, FC Rotor Volgograd and FC Krylia Sovetov Samara
- Syarhey Kuznyatsow (born 1979), Belarusian footballer with FC Metalist Kharkiv and FC Arsenal Kyiv
- Serhiy Kuznetsov (footballer, born 1982), Ukrainian footballer
- Sergey Kuznetsov (footballer, born 1986), Russian footballer with FC Luch-Energiya Vladivostok, FC Dynamo Moscow, FC Krylia Sovetov Samara, FC Kuban Krasnodar and FC Rostov
- Sergei Kuznetsov (ice hockey), born 1980, Russian ice hockey player
- Sergey Kuznetsov (volleyball) (born 1993), Kazakhstani volleyball player
- Sergey Kuznetsov (swimmer) (born 2000), Finnish swimmer who competed at the 2018 European Aquatics Championships

== Other ==
- Sergei Anatolyevich Kuznetsov (born 1956), Soviet and Russian actor in Dandelion Wine
- Sergey Kuznetsov (historian) (born 1960), Russian art historian
- Sergey Kuznetsov (architect) (born 1977), Chief Architect of Moscow
- Sergey Kuznetsov (writer) (born 1966), Russian writer, journalist and entrepreneur

== See also ==
- Serhiy Kurchenko (born 1985), Ukrainian businessman
