= Russian jazz =

Jazz music in Russia and the Soviet Union

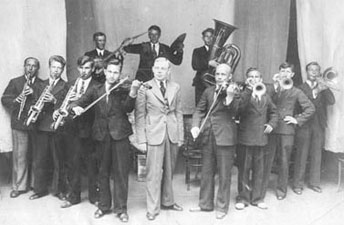
The Orchestra of Valentin Sporius, 1937, Kuybyshev

Russian jazz refers to the development, influence, and performance of jazz music in Russia and the former Soviet Union. Though jazz is often considered a quintessentially American art form, it was introduced in Russia in the 1920s and took root, developing new forms there while performers navigated cultural, political, and social challenges over time. It was suppressed during the Cold War, and later experienced a resurgence.

== History ==
=== Early work in the 1920s ===
Jazz music began to be played in the Soviet Union in the early 1920s, around the same time that it was gaining popularity in the United States. The introduction of the genre is often credited to Valentin Parnakh, a poet and choreographer inspired by American jazz performances he had seen during travels in Paris. Upon returning to the Soviet Union, Parnakh founded the RSFSR Eccentric Orchestra: Valentin Parnakh's Jazz Band, considered the first official jazz band in the country. Their debut performance took place on October 1, 1922, sparking the gradual spread of jazz across the Soviet Union. Pianist Alexander Tsfasman, singer Leonid Utyosov and film score composer Isaak Dunayevsky also helped its popularity, especially with the popular comedy film Jolly Fellows that featured a jazz soundtrack. Eddie Rosner, Oleg Lundstrem, Coretti Arle-Titz and others contributed to Soviet jazz music.

During this period, Utesov moved to Leningrad and set up one of the first Soviet jazz bands. In Leningrad, he began collaboration with the popular composer, Isaak Dunayevsky, which turned out to be a breakthrough for both artists. At that time, Utesov built a band of the finest musicians available in Leningrad, and created a style all his own – a jazz show with stand up comedy, which blended several styles, ranging from Russian folk songs to a variety of international cosmopolitan genres. In 1928, Utesov toured Europe and attended performances of American jazz bands in Paris, which influenced his own style. During the 1930s, Utesov and his band, called "Thea-Jazz" (a portmanteau of Theatrical Jazz) had a regular gig at the Marble Hall of the Kirov Palace of Culture in Leningrad. Utesov's jazz band also performed at the Leningrad Maly Opera theatre, at the "Svoboda-teatr," and at the Leningrad Music Hall. In his performances, Utesov delivered a variety of musical styles, including such genres as American jazz, Argentine tango, French chanson, upbeat dance, and Russian folk music.

=== Soviet jazz in the 1930s and 1940s ===
The disbandment of the Russian Association of Proletarian Musicians in 1932 brought a temporary reprieve for jazz in the Soviet Union. The genre flourished modestly during the 1930s and early 1940s, with jazz bands and orchestras contributing to cultural life. During World War II, jazz was used as a morale booster, performed by official war bands. Musicians like Leonid Utesov and Alexander Vladimirovich Varlamov gained prominence during this era.

Richard Stites writes:

In the years of the "red jazz age" (1932–1936) European and Soviet bands were heard in dozens of cities. The kings were Alexander Tsfasman and Leonid Utesov. ... Utesov – musically far less gifted – was actually more popular than Tsfasman, partly because of the spectacular success of his comedy film Happy-Go-Lucky Guys, but mostly because his Odessa background and his circus and carnival road experience on the southern borscht belt gave him a clowning manner. He resembled his idol, the personable Ted ("Is everybody happy?") Lewis more than he did any of the great jazz figures of the time. In fact, Utesov was the typical estrada entertainer – quick witted, versatile, and funny. He was not only one of the stars of the 1930s but also a personal favorite of Stalin.

The State Jazz Orchestra of the USSR, Russian: Государственный джаз-оркестр СССР) was established as a Soviet jazz band, existing from the late 1930s into the 1940s. After it was auditioned by Joseph Stalin in 1938, a number of similar state-sponsored musical ensembles were created across the country.

S. Frederick Starr comments in his book on Soviet jazz that the band "played with a polish and precision any Western pop orchestra might have envied". But then he adds:

For all its precision, the State Jazz Orchestra was a dismal failure. Tsfasman's Americanism and his unpopularity with the bureaucrats had disqualified him for the position of conductor, which went instead to Victor Knushevitsky, a capable musician with absolutely no feeling for jazz. Miffed, Tsfasman then declined the post of second pianist that was offered him, leaving no true jazz player except [drummer Ivan] Bacheev in a position of importance in the State Jazz Orchestra. Knushevitsky's classical background and ignorance of jazz predisposed him to turn the band into a kind of chamber orchestra with saxophones. The results were disastrous. What began as a small group rapidly snowballed into a forty-three piece ensemble, quite enough to stifle any jazz feeling or spontaneity that individual musicians might have spirited into the group.

— S. Frederick Starr. Red and Hot: The Fate of Jazz in the Soviet Union 1917–1991

Boris Schwarz's book Music and Musical Life in Soviet Russia, 1917–1970 describes The State Jazz Orchestra of the USSR as "essentially" a "light music" (easy listening) orchestra.

However, the post-war climate shifted dramatically with the onset of the Cold War. In the late 1940s, during the "anti-cosmopolitanism" campaigns, jazz music suffered from ideological oppression, as it was labeled "bourgeois" music. Many bands were dissolved, and those that remained avoided being labeled as jazz bands. Artists were marginalized, and some, like Eddie Rosner, faced imprisonment for attempting to leave the Soviet Union or for perceived political disloyalty.

=== Revival in the 1950s and 1960s ===
In the 1950s underground samizdat jazz journals and records became more common to disseminate musical literature and music.

The early 1960s, known as the Khrushchev Thaw, saw a decrease in censorship. However, jazz remained a topic of disagreement throughout the Soviet republics. In his 1963 Declaration on Music in Soviet Society, Khrushchev assured that there would be no bans on music, though he criticized certain kinds of jazz, referring to some as cacophony. While jazz was no longer banned, restrictions remained, especially in terms of access to Western jazz musicians and literature. Soviet Jazz saw a minor comeback as restrictions began to ease, and jazz clubs reemerged across the Soviet Union. Although officials remained cautious about promoting jazz, Western bands were allowed to tour in the country, and Soviet jazz musicians found new opportunities to perform. Figures like Oleg Lundstrem established themselves as key contributors, with Lundstrem founding one of the world's longest-running jazz orchestras.

Saxophonist and clarinetist Boris Midney formed a jazz quartet while studying classical music in the Soviet Union. along with performers including double bassist Igor Berukshtis. Midney and Berukshtis defected from the USSR through a US Embassy while visiting Japan in 1964. A press conference was held for the pair when they arrived in New York City. They were sponsored by American Friends of Russian Freedom, a CIA-linked organisation for Soviet defectors, who found them a manager in New York. Midney explained that he left the Soviet Union due to censorship of the arts and the suppression of jazz. After defecting, they formed the jazz ensemble, The Russian Jazz Quartet, in 1964, with New Yorkers Roger Kellaway and Grady Tate, taking inspiration from the Modern Jazz Quartet.

=== 1970s jazz-rock and beyond ===
In 1970s, jazz-rock scene began to evolve. Arsenal, founded by saxophonist Aleksei Kozlov, is considered the preeminent Jazz-rock fusion ensemble in USSR.

Viatcheslav Nazarov, a jazz trombonist, pianist, and vocalist, was recognized by jazz musicians and critics in Russia and in the United States. A graduate of the Military Music School and Musical College of Ufa, he started to play professionally in a variety of famous Soviet jazz bands in the late 1960s, when he was 16. He played in KADANS, a group led by German Lukianov, in 1977. By 1983, Nazarov was the leading soloist in the Oleg Lundstrem Orchestra, of which Igor Butman was also a member. In 1989, he and Butman played in the jazz ensemble Allegro led by Nick Levinovsky. In 1990, Nazarov worked for the ensemble Melodia. With those bands, he toured nationally and played at jazz festivals abroad. Along with Viatcheslav Preobrazhensky, he assembled a quintet and recorded two disks. Soviet jazz critics recognized Nazarov as the number one trombonist of the country for eight years. In 1990 Nazarov immigrated to the United States, where he died in an auto accident a few years later.

Georgy Garanian, an ethnic Armenian Russian jazz saxophone player, bandleader and composer, was the People's Artist of Russia in 1993. Born in Moscow, Garanian was trained at the Moscow Conservatory. He belonged to the first generation of Russian jazzmen who started to perform after World War II, and was one of the first Russian musicians to attract Western attention to jazz from the USSR. As a musician (alto saxophone), conductor and composer he was the leader of several big bands: Melodia (1970s–1980s) and Moscow Big Band (1992–1995). He led the Municipal Big Band in the Southern Russian city of Krasnodar. He toured regularly as a trio with pianist Daniil Kramer and guitarist Aleksey Kuznetsov during the 1990s.

Garanian recorded more music than any other jazz musician in Russia, performed at many international jazz festivals (Finland, India, Indonesia, Cuba etc.), toured Germany, the United States, Japan, Australia, Sweden, France, Taiwan and many other countries. Frederick Starr wrote that Garanian is one of the best jazz musicians in Russia, quoting American critic John Hammond, who heard George at the jazz festival in Prague, Czechoslovakia, — "Georgy Garanian is phaenomenal". Willis Conover, host of the "Voice of America" jazz program, invited Garanian many times to participate at International jazz festivals in Hungary, Yugoslavia and other countries. In 2000, Garanian was nominated for a Grammy Award as a conductor of the famous Tchaikovsky orchestra for the double CD album "Oregon in Moscow", which had been made together with renowned American jazz group Oregon and produced by Pat Metheny Group's Steve Rodby.

== See also ==
- Armenian jazz
