= Aleksey Kuznetsov =

Aleksei or Aleksey Kuznetsov may refer to:

- Aleksey Kuznetsov (actor) (1941–2023), Soviet and Russian actor and director
- Aleksey Kuznetsov (footballer) (born 1996), Russian footballer
- Aleksey Kuznetsov (guitarist) (born 1941), Russian guitarist
- Aleksey Kuznetsov (politician) (born 1971), Russian statesman and manager
- Aleksey Kuznetsov (skier) (1929–2003), Russian skier
- Aleksey Kuznetsov (swimmer) (born 1968), Russian swimmer
- Alexey Kuznetsov (1905–1950), Soviet statesman
- Alexey Kuznetsov (field athlete) (born 1981), Paralympian athlete from Russia
- Alexey Yakovlevich Kuznetsov (1910–1969), Soviet engineer
- Aleksey Igorevich Kuznetsov (born 1983), Kazakhstani ice hockey goaltender
