= Artur Kuznetsov =

Artur Kuznetsov may refer to:

- Artur Kuznetsov (Russian footballer), born 1972
- Artur Kuznetsov (Ukrainian footballer), born 1995
