= William Weiner =

Armenian–Israeli composer, violinist and vocalist

William Weiner ויליאם ויינר
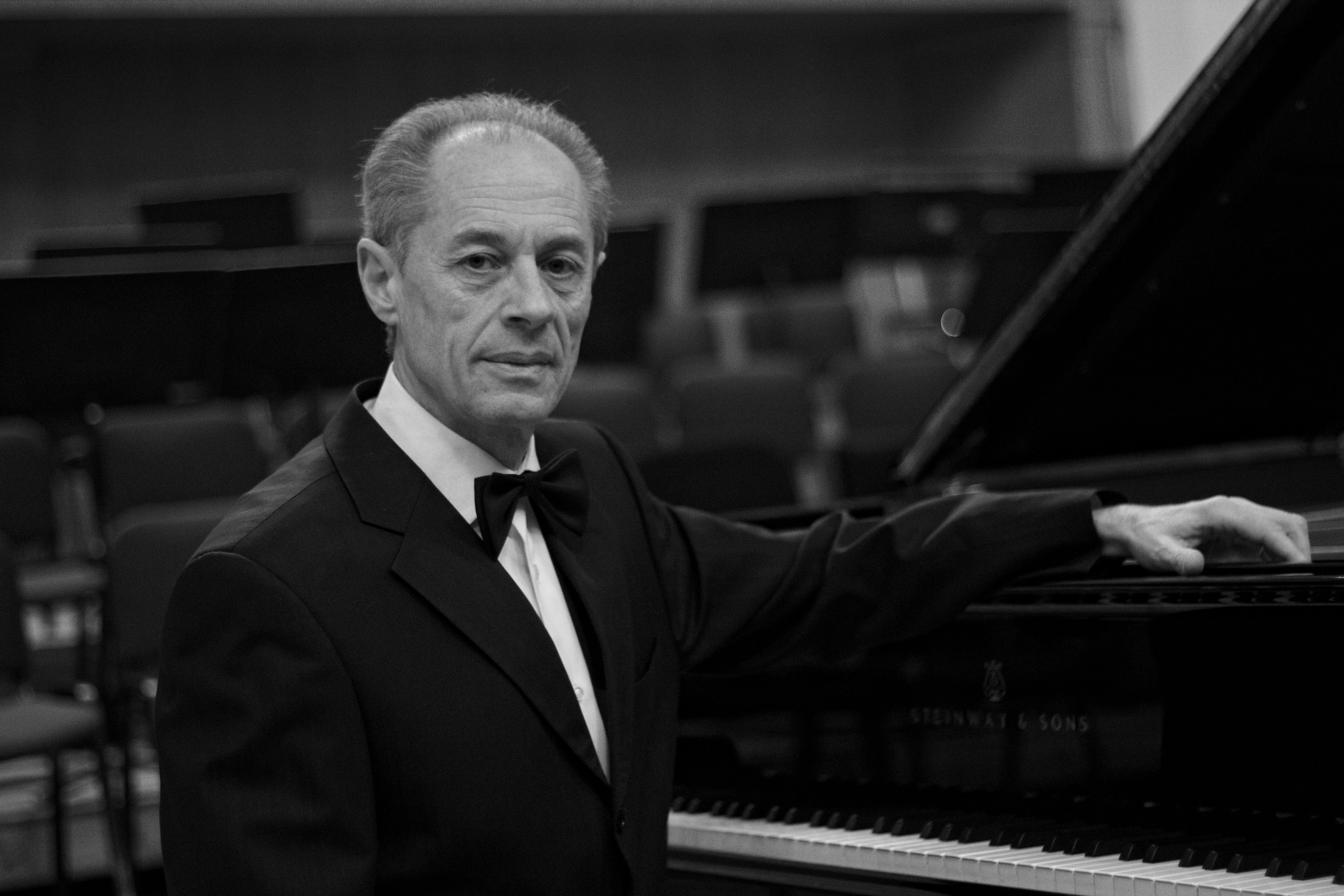
- William Weiner

Background information
- Born: 25 November 1955; Yerevan, Armenian SSR
- Genres: Symphonic music, chamber music, jazz music, choral music
- Occupations: Composer, violinist, vocalist
- Years active: 1974 – present

William Weiner (Hebrew: ויליאם ויינר; Armenian: Վիլյամ Վայներ; Russian: Вилья́м Макси́мович Ва́йнер, commonly known as Willy Weiner) (born 25 November 1955) is an Armenian–Israeli composer, violinist and vocalist; Meritorious Worker of Art of Armenia (2008); a member of the Israel Composers League (2013); president of the Jewish cultural center "Menorah" in Armenia (1994), and director of the Yerevan State Chamber Choir (2018).

== Biography ==
Born to a Jewish family in Yerevan, Willy Weiner graduated with honors from the Yerevan Komitas State Conservatory. While there, Willy attended violin classes led by Professor Jean Ter-Merguerian from 1974 through 1979. After more than thirty years as a violinist, he has changed his career from an instrumentalist to a popular composer.

He has been one of the leaders of the Jewish movement since the 1970s. He was behind the creation of the Jewish community in Armenia. In the darkest years of the independent Armenian state (1992–1995), he was the head of the community. In 1994, Weiner founded a Jewish cultural center, Menorah, which resulted in the organization of many festivals, concerts and cultural events initiated and coordinated by him.

In 2008, Willy Weiner was awarded the title of Meritorious Worker of Art of Armenia for his significant contribution to the culture of the country for many years. In 2010, on the occasion of the 30th anniversary of his creative activity, Weiner was awarded an honorary diploma by the Ministry of Culture of Armenia for his significant contribution to the development of classical music culture of Armenia and for his achievements in the promotion of tolerance through universal values. Since 2013, he has been a member of the Israel Composers' League. Upon the occasion of the 40th anniversary of the creative activity, Willy Weiner was awarded the Gold Medal of the Ministry of Culture of Armenia for his significant contribution to the country's culture (2015).

== Family history ==
The families of Willy Weiner's parents experienced evacuations, enforced expatriation and the horrors of the Nazi concentration camps during World War II.

In 1927, the family of his father, Maxim (Mordkha) Weiner, emigrated from their native city of Uman, Ukraine, to the United States. Later, they settled in the city of Schiedam near Rotterdam, in the Netherlands, where they lived for 13 years. The book Shadows over Schiedam 2, which describes the fate of Jews during the German occupation (1941–1945) and was based on material from the Dutch municipal archives, includes a chapter entitled "The Weiners" describing the tragic history of the family's deportation from the Netherlands. The Weiners arrived to Armenia in 1941 from a concentration camp near Berlin. Due to their Soviet passports, they were transferred through Europe to the northwestern city of Leninakan (current Gyumri), Armenia. After a two-month stay in Yerevan in a prison camp behind the tire plant, the "politically unreliable" were forced into exile in North Kazakhstan (1941–1946). The family left Armenia without the head of the family (the composer's grandfather, Zeylig Weiner); he had to go to the hospital because of a perforated stomach ulcer. In the autumn of 1946, the grandmother Miriam Weiner (Chervonaya) and her four children (Maxim, Klara, Bronya and Lida) obtained an exit permit and came back to Yerevan with the hope of finding her husband, but her efforts were in vain.

In 1941, Willy Weiner's mother, Ida Yerusalimskaya, along with her family (his grandmother, Miriam Yerusalimskaya (Vyazovskaya), and his grandfather, Mark (Mordkha-Moyshe) Yerusalimsky), were evacuated to Kyrgyzstan from their native city of Cherkassy, returning home in 1944. In 1953, Ida Yerusalimskaya graduated from Kiev State University and travelled to Yerevan on an invitation from a friend. She was introduced to Maxim Weiner, and two years later Willy was born.

Maxim Weiner and his wife, Ida Yerusalimskaya, along with their children, son William and daughters Zinaida and Marina, lived in Yerevan for more than 40 years. In November 1993, all of them, with the daughters' families, repatriated to Israel, residing in the city of Akko. Currently, Willy Weiner lives and works in his native city of Yerevan.

== Reviews ==
"Perhaps for the first time, I've heard such pure classical rendition of national musical intonations, absolutely free from any pop fluff. Willy Weiner not only possesses a good sense of this music, he hears it from inside and reveals its melodic and harmonious richness artfully mastering the orchestra's palette…" – People's Artist of the USSR Iosif Kobzon.

"I have always readily supported art which has a wholesome effect on people's mind. The works by Willy Weiner are undoubtedly consonant with this concept. His works are rich in sincerity and expressive orchestra colors…" – People's Artist of the USSR Yuri Bashmet.

"His music is emotional from beginning to end, and one listens to his opuses with unflagging attention. His works are diverse in nature and finely instrumented. At the same time, it is necessary to point out the superb performance by the orchestra and its soloists. Composer Willy Weiner has a profound understanding of Jewish music and I believe his works will be very well appreciated by the audience of various national identities…" – People's Artist of the USSR, composer Oscar Feltsman.

"I highly appreciate his sense of national dignity and eternal love towards his people, which is accurately and fully reflected in his music. Jewish traditional Melos is a basis for Weiner's thought in his creative search. His artistic explorations do not aim at repeating the folklore but at deriving his inspiration from the past, rich ideology and musical values, and at adhering to the principles of the artistic authenticity. It is the modal musical thinking that prevails among his pieces. His works, which embody the East with its musical originality and are displayed in accentuated and grand musical tones, are lyrical and profound at times. While listening to Willy Weiner's works, one discovers musical reality "in the shrine", which has certain sanctity and represents the Jewish East. It can become kindred with another reality, the Armenian East." – People's Artist of Armenia, composer Tigran Mansurian.

== Works ==
Weiner created a series of classical Jewish orchestral works presented in three albums: "Exodus", "Dream" and "My People". The works combine Jewish music traditions and history with folk music. Weiner's music has been performed by numerous artists all over the world, including Armenia, Georgia, Russia, Israel, Germany and many others.

Willy Weiner is also the author of chamber instrumental, piano and choral works. His 2011 book, Piano Pieces in C, was published with the assistance of the Ministry of Culture of Armenia.

=== Orchestral ===
- "Exodus" (for symphony orchestra), 2000
- "Jerusalem of Mine" (for clarinet, violin, and symphony orchestra), 1998
- "Hassidic Dance" (for clarinet and symphony orchestra), 1997
- "Funny Story" (Maise) (for clarinet and symphony orchestra), 1999
- "Small Town" (Shtetl) (for trumpet and symphony & jazz orchestra), 1999
- "Rendez-Vous" (for symphony & jazz orchestra), 2005
- "An Old Organ-Grinder" (for piano and symphony orchestra), 2000
- "Lullaby" (for clarinet, guitar, flute, string orchestra with vocal bass and alto), 1998
- "Song of Songs" (for trumpet, piano and symphony orchestra), 1999
- "Love Song" (for tenor sax, clarinet, trumpet and symphony & jazz orchestra), 2006
- "The Dream" (Khalom) (for tenor sax, clarinet, trumpet, trombone and Big-band), 2002
- "Jewish Tango" (for clarinet, accordion, symphony & jazz), 2000
- "Autumn Roman" (for tenor sax, clarinet, trumpet, trombone and symphony & jazz orchestra), 2003
- "Klezmer" (for clarinet and Big-band), 2001
- "The Joy" (Simkha) (for trumpet, clarinet and Big-band), 2001
- "Jacob's Lily" (Shoshanat Ya'akov) (for clarinet, trumpet and symphony orchestra), 2001
- "The Tune" (Nigun) (for clarinet and symphony orchestra), 2000
- "Queen Esther's Dance" (for piano and symphony orchestra), 2003
- "MACCABI" (for piano and symphony orchestra), 2003
- "Life Is Useless" (for piano and symphony orchestra), 2002
- "My People" (Ami) (for violin and symphony orchestra), 2006
- "To Life" (Lekhaim) (for symphony & jazz orchestra), 2007
- "Ascension" (Aliah) (for Big-band), 2007
- "Childhood Melody" (for clarinet, flute, oboe and symphony orchestra), 2007
- "Spring Rain" (for symphony orchestra), 2007
- "Evening by the Sea" (for tenor sax, clarinet, trumpet, trombone and symphony & jazz orchestra), 2008
- "Once Upon A Time…" (for Big-band), 2008
- "Memory" (Zikaron) (for piano and symphony orchestra), 2008
- "Small Ballerina" (for symphony orchestra), 2009
- "In The Good Mood" (for Big-band), 2007
- "Creation" (for piano and symphony orchestra), 2005
- "Moon Waltz" (for piano, vibraphone and string orchestra), 2004
- "Yerevan Samba" (for Big-band), 2006
- "Autumn Leaves" (for piano and symphony orchestra), 2009
- "Nice Mistake" (for piano and symphony orchestra), 2009

=== Chamber music ===
- "Lullaby" (for clarinet, guitar, flute, string quartet with vocal bass and alto), 2010
- "The Tune" (Nigun) (for cello or clarinet and chamber orchestra), 2010
- Jewish Rhapsody "Ami" (for violin and chamber orchestra; for cello and chamber orchestra; for trio – violin, cello, piano; for duet – violin, piano), 2012
- "Spring Rain" (for chamber string orchestra), 2007

=== Piano ===
Piano pieces in C (2009–2011)

- "Creation"
- "Exodus"
- "Queen Esther's Dance"
- "MACCABI"
- "Life Is Useless"
- "My People" (Ami)
- "Jacob's Lily" (Shoshanat Ya'akov)
- "Small Ballerina"
- "Moon Waltz"
- "Ascension" (Aliah)
- "An Old Organ-Grinder"
- "Autumn Leaves"
- "Memory" (Zikaron)
- "Nice Mistake"
- "Yerevan Samba"

=== Choral ===
Choral pieces (2013–2017)

- "Ascension" (Aliah)
- "Exodus"
- "Funny Story" (Maise)
- "Lullaby"
- "Life Is Useless"
- "Childhood Melody"
- "Moon Waltz"
- "Spring Rain"
- "An Old Organ-Grinder"
- "Autumn Leaves"
- "Evening By The Sea"
- "Once Upon a Time…"
- "In The Good Mood"
- "Lekhaim" (To Life)

== Discography ==
=== CD ===
- 2003 – "Exodus" ("Narek.com", US) – performed by the Armenian National Radio and TV Sympho-jazz orchestra.
- 2008 – "Khalom" ("C Digital Print", Armenia) – performed by the Armenian National Radio and TV Sympho-jazz orchestra.
- 2011 – "Piano Pieces in C" ("C Digital Print", Armenia) – performed by Anahit Nersesyan.
- 2013 – "Piano Pieces in C" ("CDBRAND", Russia) – performed by Hayk Melikyan.
- 2013 – "Orchestral Pieces" ("CDBRAND", Russia) – 2 set CD "Exodus" & "Khalom" – performed by the Armenian National Radio and TV Sympho-jazz orchestra.
- 2018 – "Choral Pieces" (TM Production, Armenia) — performed by the Yerevan State Chamber Choir.

=== DVD ===
- 2006 – DVD "Willy Weiner and the best soloists of Armenia" ("ROFF Technologies", Russia). The live version of the concert at the Opera & Ballet State Academic Theater dedicated to 50th anniversary of Willy Weiner's birthday – performed by the Armenian National Radio and TV Sympho-jazz orchestra.
- 2007 – DVD "EXODUS by Willy Weiner" ("C Digital Print", Armenia) – Film by Nika Shek about composer's life and creative activity.
- 2007 – DVD "ANGEL ON THE ROOFS" ("Kavingrig", Armenia) – Film by Karen Grigoryan dedicated to 120th anniversary of Marc Chagall's birthday. All music by Willy Weiner.
