= Nuance =

Nuance may refer to:

- Nuance (American band), 1980s dance music group
- Nuance (Canadian band), 1980s pop rock group from Quebec
- Nuance Communications, a company that sells voice and productivity software
- Nuance Jazz Band, an Armenian ethnic jazz group
- Nuance Party (Swedish: Partiet Nyans), a Swedish political party
