= Levon Malkhasyan =

Armenian jazz pianist

- Լևոն Մալխասյան
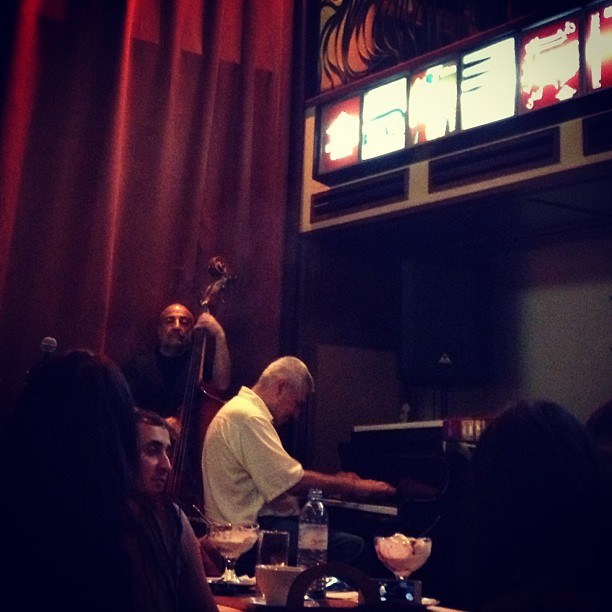
- Malkhasyan (right)
- Born: 1 January 1945 (age 80); Yerevan, Armenian SSR, Soviet Union
- Occupation(s): Musician, composer, pianist

Levon Malkhasyan (Armenian: Լևոն Մալխասյան; born 1 January 1945), also known as Malkhas, is an Armenian jazz musician, composer and pianist, one of the founders of the Armenian jazz scene, and owner of Malkhas Jazz Club.

== Early life ==
Levon Malkhasyan was born in 1945 in Yerevan. His father, Paruyr, was the director of the sheet rolling factory and his mother, Nina – a Russian language teacher. He had a brother Robert Malkhasyan (1935–1955) and a sister Evgenia Malkhasyan (1938–2017).

Until the fourth grade Levon Malkhasyan was a student at School No 71, afterward moved to School No. 8 after A.S.Pushkin. During his school years, he was a captain at a school basketball team as well as started playing piano and accompanying different artists from the age of 15. No one in the family possessed musical abilities. 1962 -1967 Levon Malkhasyan studied at Yerevan Brusov State University of Languages and Social Sciences majoring in Russian language and literature. Here he led a basketball team as well. During his university years he, along with a drummer Armen Tutunjyan (known as Chico) and a contrabass player Arthur Abrahamyan, founded a jazz trio called "Levon Malkhasyan's Trio" which was the first jazz trio ever in Yerevan. The band held small concerts at "Union of Composers" concert hall, the Philharmonic Hall and other venues. The trio with a slightly different line-up exists until today. Several years later the trio is being joined by a saxophonist Alexander Zakaryan and becomes a quartet.

== Career ==
During the All-Union festival held in 1968 the quartet was awarded the 1st prize. 1970 the Quartet received a Grand Prix in Kuibyshev (now Samara) at the All-Union Festival as well as the prize for "The Best Armenian Arrangement". In addition, Levon Malkashayn shared the "Best Pianist" title with another musician from Ukraine and the band won prizes in the categories "Best Drummer" and "Best Saxophonist". 1972 at the All-Union Festival in Yaroslavl, the quartet again took the 1st place and won the title of best in all categories. The program, composed of 7th-century sharakans in jazz arrangement, was also recognized as the best, and the suite on the theme of ancient Church Songs was awarded the main prize. The Malkhasyan Quartet has also participated in various festivals in Tbilisi, Donetsk, Moscow etc. In different periods of time starting from 1964 to 1980 Levon Malkhasyan played at various restaurants such as Akhtamar restaurant in Sevan, Dvin, and Ani Intourist Hotel. In 1980 the era of work in restaurants was over. In 1973 – 1980 Levon Malkhasyan played in different bands such as "Krunk", "Tziatzan", "Serpentine", "CYO (Committee of youth organizations). As a part of "Krunk", together with Aksel Bakunts, he toured all over the USSR. In 1980 Levon Malkhasyan founded the first jazz center at the Aesthetic Center of Henrich Igityan where almost all the famous jazz musicians of that period gathered for jam sessions and concerts. 1985 the first three-day All-Union Jazz Festival was organized by Levon Malkhasyan held in Philharmonic Concert hall where musicians from 14 cities of the Soviet Union participated. 1986 he organized "Jazz Panorama" contest-festival which brought together musicians from all over the USSR as well as a big band which performed under the direction of Konstantin Orbelyan. In 1996 Levon Malkhasyan received an invitation from Nushikyan Association to perform at "Aragast" café (the famous Float). Three days later he invited Aksel Bakunts, then Armen Usnunts Quintet, Khachik Sahakyan, Vahagn Hayrapetyan to accompany him. After some time he reanimated the "Float" and turned it into a Jazz Club. Then he starts organizing festivals. In 1998 a five-day "International Jazz Festival" took place at the Yerevan Opera Theater again due to Levon Malkhasyan. New York Voices Vocal-instrumental jazz orchestra, jazz veterans from New Orleans and many other bands from CIS countries participated in that festival. In 2000 he organizes the next Jazz festival, but this time a bigger one, and a special guest of this event was famous Jazz King Chick Corea. In 2003 Levon Malkhasyan releases his first CD. In 2006 during the 3rd International Jazz Festival Yerevan hosts "Earth, Wind And Fire" – one of the most famous Jazz Bands in the world. In 2008 Levon Malkasyan in cooperation with "Sharm" organizes a number of events dedicated to the 70th anniversary of the Armenian Jazz. Within the framework of this one-year-long festival Yerevan hosted a number of world-famous artists such as Al Jarreau, Joe Cocker, George Benson, "Shakatak" Band, Georgiy Garanyan, Toma Katashvili, Dato Japaradze and many others. An event took place every single month and Konstantin Orbelyan's 80 years anniversary was also celebrated that year.

== Personal life ==
In 1964 Levon Malkhasyan married Nina Ter-Ghazaryan – a five-time gold medalist in swimming and a well-known radiographer. Their daughter, Irina Malkhasyan, a composer and a singer, teaches at Yerevan State Conservatory after Komitas. Levon Malkhasyan made arrangements of a number of jazz compositions, he's the author of the "Yerevan Jan" waltz which is a soundtrack of the self-titled movie. According to the musician's words, he had three big dreams and each of them came true. 1st one – to be able to witness famous American jazz musicians in their home country. In 1990 Levon Malkhasyan traveled to the US where most of his time he spent in different jazz clubs meeting different musicians and seeing them perform live. 2nd one – organizing an international jazz festival in Yerevan with American musicians – a dream that came true multiple times. 3rd one – found and own a jazz club. In 2006 a club called "Malkhas" was opened in Yerevan. It is one of the most beloved clubs both among locals and the guests of the country. Today it has 7 resident-bands. Levon Malkhasyan toured around 50 countries, but he never stayed anywhere for more than 2 weeks. In 1999 was awarded the Movses Khorenatsi Medal of the Republic of Armenia In 2003 was awarded the title of Honorary Citizen of Yerevan In 2007 receives the title of Honored Worker of Art of the Republic of Armenia In 2008 was Awarded the Order of the Russian Federation after Lomonosov with the tape "For the propagation and spread of Armenian jazz abroad. In 2010 Awarded the Gold Medal of the Ministry of Culture of the Republic of Armenia In 2013 Receives the title of People's Artist of the Republic of Armenia Levon Malkhasyan was awarded the gold medal of the Golden Apricot Film Festival and the gold medal after Arno Babajanyan. Levon Malkhasyan is an Academician of the Canadian Institute of Informatics, Laureate of the "Karot" Prize, Laureate of the All-Union Jazz Festivals. In 2010 he was recognized as a "Person of the Year RAU" by the Russian-Armenian (Slavonic) University.

== Awards ==
Year	Award
1999	Movses Khorenatsi Medal of the Republic of Armenia
2003	Honorary Citizen of Yerevan
2007	Honored Worker of Art of the Republic of Armenia
2008	Order of the Russian Federation after Lomonosov with the tape "For the propagation and spread of Armenian jazz abroad.
2010	Gold Medal of the Ministry of Culture of the Republic of Armenia
2013	People's Artist of the Republic of Armenia
2017	Swallow Music Awards
