= Yevgeny Berkovich =

- Евгений Беркович
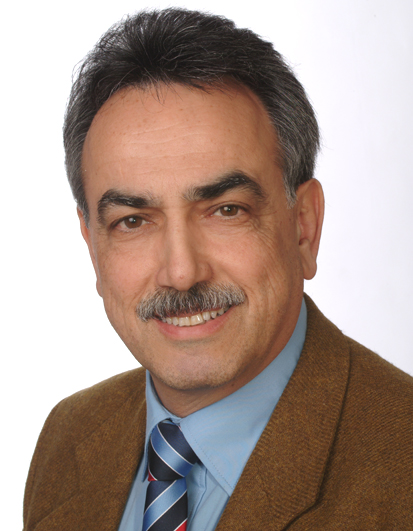
- Berkovich in 2005
- Born: 6 October 1945 (age 80); Irkutsk, Russian SFSR, Soviet Union
- Education: Moscow State University
- Occupations: Historian; publicist; mathematician
- Awards: Medal "For Labour Valour"; Medal "Veteran of Labour"

Yevgeny Mikhailovich Berkovich (Russian: Евгений Михайлович Беркович; born October 6, 1945, Irkutsk) is a Russian-Jewish mathematician, publicist, historian of science and literature, publisher and editor.

He is the founder of the online portal "Notes on Jewish History", which publishes the journal of the same name and the almanac "Jewish Antiquity". He is also the founder and editor-in-chief of the journal "Seven Arts" and the journal-newspaper "Workshop".

He is the author of the books "Notes on Jewish History" and "The Banality of Goodness: Heroes, the Righteous, and Other People in the History of the Holocaust: Notes on Twentieth-Century Jewish History", "The Odyssey of Peter Pringsheim" (2013), "Antipodes: Albert Einstein and Philipp Lenard in the Context of Physics and History" (2014), and "The Revolution in Physics and the Fates of Its Heroes." Thomas Mann and the Physicists of the 20th Century (2017), The Revolution in Physics and the Fates of Its Heroes. Albert Einstein in the Focus of 20th-Century History (2018), Albert Einstein and the "Revolution of Prodigies": Essays on the Development of Quantum Mechanics and the Unified Field Theory (2021), Notes on Albert Einstein. Time, Science, Life (2025). Scriptwriter for the documentary film Questions to God.

== Biography ==
He was born on October 6, 1945, in Irkutsk. His father, Mikhail Shaevich Berkovich, was a radio engineer (born 1917 in Ukraine – died 2001 in Moscow), and his mother, Alexandra Vladimirovna Senderova, was a historian (born 1924 in Miloslavichi, Belarus – died in 1980 in Moscow).

From 1946 to 1995, he lived, studied, and worked in Moscow.

He graduated from the Physics Department of Moscow State University in 1968, earned a PhD in Physics and Mathematics (1973), and is a senior researcher and Doctor of Natural Sciences (Germany).

Since 1995, he has lived and worked in Hanover, Germany.

Publications on Jewish history, history of science and literature in the periodicals Novy Mir, Znamya, Neva, Inostrannaya Literatura, Voprosy Literatury, Chelovek, Studiya, 22, Lechaim, Vestnik (Baltimore) and many other publications in Russia, Ukraine, USA, Israel, Germany, as well as books on the history of science and Jewish history, which have received critical acclaim.
