= Aleksandr Kuznetsov =

Alexander or Aleksandr Kuznetsov is the name of:

== Footballers ==
- Aleksandr Kuznetsov (footballer, born 1951), Soviet Russian football player and coach
- Aleksandr Kuznetsov (footballer, born 1997), Russian footballer

== Other sportspeople ==
- Aleksandr Kuznetsov (skier), Russian skier, participated in Cross-country skiing at the 2007 Winter Universiade
- Aleksandr Anatolyevich Kuznetsov (born 1941), Russian cycling coach for Viatcheslav Ekimov, father of Svetlana Kuznetsova
- Alex Kuznetsov (born 1987), American tennis player of Ukrainian origin
- Alexander Kuznetsov (ice hockey) (born 1992), Russian ice hockey player

== Others ==
- Aleksandr Kuznetsov (explorer), Russian explorer of the North Pole
- Aleksandr Kuznetsov (tea trader) (1856–1895) Russian tea magnate, landowner of Foros, Crimea, and financier of Foros Church
- Aleksandr Vasilyevich Kuznetsov (Hero of the Russian Federation), Hero of the Russian Federation
- Alexander Kuznetsov (actor) (1959–2019), Russian-American actor
- Alexander Kuznetsov (mathematician) (born 1973), Russian mathematician
- Aleksandr Kuznetsov (actor) (born 1992), Russian actor
- Aleksandr Kuznetsov (designer) (1930–1998), Russian film production designer
