= Literaturnaya =

Russian serif typeface created in 1930s

- Category: serif
- Designer(s): Hermann Berthold; Lyubov Kuznetsova
- Foundry: Poligraphmash; ParaGraph
- Sample

Literaturnaya (Russian: Литерату́рная гарниту́ра or simply Литерату́рная) is a serif typeface, created in the USSR. Designed at Poligraphmash (Полиграфмаш) at the end of the 1930s by Anatolii Shchukin (Анатолий Васильевич Щукин), the font was based on Hermann Berthold's Latinskaya (St. Petersburg, 1901), a version of Lateinisch for Russia, also developed at the Berthold foundry (Berlin, 1899). The digital version of Literaturnaya was developed at ParaGraph (ПараГраф) foundry in 1996 by Lyubov Kuznetsova. Also, there was an unofficial digital version, created in 1992 by an unknown author (sometimes credited as !22! Soft).

== Use and popularity ==
Literaturnaya was mostly used in the USSR, Bulgaria and other socialist countries from its creation in the late 1930s to the early 1990s. (the last examples of prints, set in it date back to 1995) and was standard Cyrillic typeface during this period of time. It was informally called "The favourite font of Russian typographers". Most of the 1950–1990 books were set in Literaturnaya typeface. It was also used in some magazines, newspapers, brochures, written advertisements and journals. After the split of the Soviet Union, the font was replaced with the more popular Times New Roman. As of 2009, Literaturnaya is rarely (almost never) used, although there are some indications that its popularity is increasing among Russians. Literaturnaya also started appearing in decorative titles in East European countries such as Bulgaria.

== See also ==
- Typography
- Serif
- Times New Roman
