= Alexander Tsfasman =

Russian composer and jazz pianist

Alexander Tsfasman Александр Наумович Цфасман
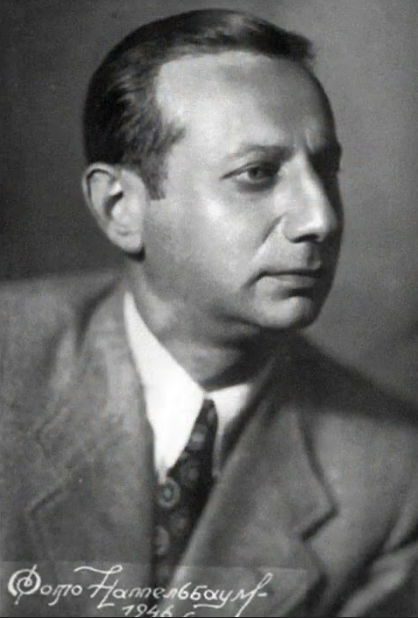

Background information
- Born: December 14, 1906; Aleksandrovsk, Yekaterinoslav Governorate, Russian Empire
- Died: February 20, 1971 (aged 64) Moscow, USSR
- Occupations: Composer, Pianist, Orchestra Leader, Arranger
- Instrument: Piano
- Years active: 1924–1971
- Spouse: Gertrude Grandel (1930-1939)

Alexander Naumovich Tsfasman (Russian: '''Александр Наумович Цфасман'''; 14 December 1906, Alexandrovsk, Yekaterinoslav Governorate, Russian Empire — 20 February 1971, Moscow, USSR) was a Soviet pianist, composer, arranger, conductor, orchestra leader, publicist, and public figure. He was one of the founders of Soviet jazz and led several jazz ensembles, including serving as the artistic director of the Jazz Orchestra of the All-Union Radio from 1939 to 1946. In 1957 he was awarded the title of Honored Artist of the RSFSR.

== Biography ==
He was born into a Jewish family in the provincial city of Aleksandrovsk (now Zaporizhzhia, Ukraine). His father, Nokhim-Itskhok (Naum Isaakovich) Tsfasman (1875–1936), originally from Petrikov in Mozyr district of Minsk province, was a hairdresser who owned the establishment known as the “First Barbershop” and also operated a paid library and hotel in the same building. He was an amateur violinist and passed his love of music to his son. Tsfasman's mother, Perl Srul-Iosifovna (Polina Izrailevna) Tsfasman (née Gokhgilern, 1886–1928), was his father's second wife. The family lived in a large building on the corner of Troitska and Soborna streets in Aleksandrovsk. From the age of seven, Alexander studied violin and piano, with teachers invited to the house because the family could afford formal instruction. Although he began with the violin, he soon gravitated strongly toward the piano.

During the turmoil of the Russian Civil War and the wave of Jewish pogroms that spread across parts of the former Russian Empire, the Tsfasman family moved to Nizhny Novgorod. At the age of twelve, Alexander entered the piano department of the local music technical school. His early musical talent became evident quickly; at thirteen, in 1919, he won first prize for his performance of Franz Liszt's Eleventh Hungarian Rhapsody. Between 1920 and 1923 he worked as a percussionist in the symphony orchestra in Nizhny Novgorod, gaining orchestral experience while continuing his musical development. In 1923, at the age of seventeen, he moved to Moscow. There he soon became head of the music department of the Moscow Drama Studio named after Alexander Griboyedov, a position he held from 1924 to 1925. From 1925 to 1930 he studied at the Moscow Conservatory in the piano department under the professor Felix Blumenfeld. He graduated with a gold medal, and many musicians predicted that he would become a major classical pianist. Instead, he became deeply fascinated with jazz, a musical form that was then spreading across Europe and the Soviet Union.

In 1924 Tsfasman began composing his first works, including pieces such as “Eccentric Dance” and “Sad Mood.” In 1926, while still a student at the conservatory, he founded the jazz ensemble AMA-Jazz (Association of Moscow Artists Jazz Orchestra), which became the first professional jazz orchestra in Moscow. The orchestra quickly gained popularity and performed its first concert in March 1927. It played a repertoire of Soviet and foreign compositions, tangos, and Tsfasman's own jazz works and arrangements. In 1927 the orchestra performed jazz music on Soviet radio for the first time and soon after made some of the earliest jazz recordings in the USSR on gramophone records, including a recording of “Hallelujah.” The ensemble performed in prominent Moscow venues such as the Hermitage Garden, the Casino restaurant on Triumfalnaya Square, and cinemas including Dynamo and others. Musicians and composers admired the technical brilliance of the orchestra and especially Tsfasman's virtuoso piano playing and imaginative arrangements. The composer Isaak Dunaevsky frequently attended the group's rehearsals, while the young composer Artur Polonsky dedicated his early jazz piece “Jazz Foxtrot” to Tsfasman. Tsafsman also performed at the "Savoy" restaurant as his base, and the major hotels, theatres, and concert halls in Moscow. In those eras, performing in restaurants was seen as prestigious.

In the early 1930s, Tsfasman worked as a pianist, film accompanist, and musical illustrator. He also served as an accompanist at the Bolshoi Theatre School from 1933 to 1934. In 1932 he formed another ensemble known as “Moscow Guys” (also referred to as Alexander Tsfasman's Jazz Orchestra). The group performed widely, including regular performances at the Savoy restaurant, and toured throughout the Soviet Union. The orchestra participated in the Moscow Jazz Evenings of 1936 and became one of the most popular jazz ensembles in the country. Tsfasman also performed solo piano concerts during this period. His pianistic talent impressed many prominent musicians including Alexander Goldenweiser, Konstantin Igumnov, Heinrich Neuhaus, and Dmitri Shostakovich. Shostakovich later asked Tsfasman to perform the piano part in the orchestral sequence of the film Unforgettable 1919, noting that although the part would not be difficult for Tsfasman, the composer himself could not perform it.

While touring Leningrad, Alexander Tsfasman met Gertrude Grandel, an American who had arrived in the USSR in 1930 and graduated from the Leningrad Conservatory in percussion instruments in 1935. They soon married and lived for a time in Moscow on Sretenka Street. Before the war, they lived in the elevated section of Begovaya Street, at No. 24, a building built for the employees of the Moscow Hippodrome. Tsfasman had received the apartment when he was already the director of the All-Union Radio Committee Orchestra (the then-famous singer Georgy Pavlovich Vinogradov also lived in the same building).

In 1939 Tsfasman became artistic director of the All-Union Radio Jazz Orchestra, a position he held until 1946. Under his leadership the orchestra collaborated with many famous Soviet singers, including Ivan Kozlovsky, Sergei Lemeshev, Nadezhda Kazantseva, Klavdiya Shulzhenko, Mark Bernes, Ivan Shmelev, Vladimir Bunchikov, Pavel and Mikhail Mikhailov, Efrem Flaks, and Ruzhena Sikora. Numerous notable instrumentalists also worked in the ensemble, including Mikhail Frumkin, Emil Geigner, Alexander Rivchun, Valentin Berlinsky, Igor Gladkov, and the drummer Laci Olah. During the Second World War the orchestra was evacuated to Kuibyshev (now Samara), where the Soviet government had temporarily relocated, and continued performing concerts between 1941 and 1942 before traveling to the front lines to perform for Soviet soldiers. During the war, Tsfasman composed songs with patriotic themes such as “Merry Tanker” and “Young Sailors.” He was also one of the pioneers of the swing style in the Soviet Union.

After the opening of the Second Front in 1944, the orchestra increasingly performed Western works, including pieces by American composers such as Jerome Kern. Tsfasman created arrangements in the swing style of American big bands, and in 1945 his orchestra performed George Gershwin's “Rhapsody in Blue” for the first time in Moscow, in the Column Hall of the House of Unions and later in the Great Hall of the Moscow Conservatory. This performance was enthusiastically received by audiences. However, the postwar political climate soon changed, and jazz music came under ideological criticism as an example of “bourgeois” Western culture. Tsfasman left his position with the radio orchestra in 1946, reportedly following conflicts with the administration over repertoire restrictions.

After leaving the radio orchestra, Tsfasman continued performing as a pianist and composing music for theater and film productions. He served as head of the musical department of the Hermitage Variety Theatre beginning in 1946. Despite the changing cultural climate, he remained a popular performer and continued to play works by Gershwin and other composers. In March 1955 he again performed Gershwin's “Rhapsody in Blue” in the Column Hall of the House of Unions with an orchestra conducted by Nikolai Anosov. In December 1956 a jubilee concert celebrating both his fiftieth birthday and forty years of creative activity was held at the same venue. During the later decades of his life, Tsfasman continued composing jazz pieces and orchestral works, including an “Intermezzo for Clarinet and Jazz Orchestra,” which he dedicated to the famous American clarinetist Benny Goodman; Goodman later included the work in his repertoire. Tsfasman also wrote orchestral pieces, songs, and music for theatrical productions and films, including the Ukrainian film Tarapunka and Shtepsel under the Clouds (1953).

Tsfasman's compositions included popular works such as “Unsuccessful Date,” “Sounds of Jazz,” “Happy Rain,” and the famous tango arrangement “Tired Sun” (originally based on the Polish tango “Ta ostatnia niedziela”). In his arrangement and performance, the song became one of the most recognizable musical symbols of the prewar Soviet era. Tsfasman's orchestra was also among the first in the USSR to broadcast jazz performances on radio and television. Throughout his career he remained known for his brilliant piano technique, inventive arrangements, and ability to combine classical training with jazz improvisation.

In 1966 Tsfasman became one of the founders and a member of the International Jazz Federation of UNESCO, working alongside figures such as Willis Conover and Alexei Batashev. During his lifetime he was recognized as one of the most important figures in Soviet jazz and was awarded the title of Honored Artist of the RSFSR. Despite political fluctuations in the Soviet Union regarding jazz music, Tsfasman managed to maintain his career by carefully navigating the cultural environment and presenting his music in forms that remained accessible to audiences and acceptable to authorities.

== Personal life ==
Tsfasman was married twice. His first wife was Gertrude Grandel (1920–1969), an American who moved with her parents from Detroit to Petrozavodsk in 1935. She studied at the Leningrad Conservatory and worked for the Karelia Radio Committee while also performing in variety programs. She met Tsfasman by 1937, and recordings exist in which she played the marimba in a duet with her husband on piano. Eventually she managed to return to the United States. Their son, Robert Tsfasman (1939–2010), remained with his father after the couple's divorce. Robert became a journalist and translator and graduated from the Faculty of Philology at Lomonosov Moscow State University. He worked for more than thirty years at the Novosti Press Agency and on the editorial staff of the magazine Soviet Life. He died in 2010 after slipping and being struck by a trolleybus. Tsfasman's second wife, Ksenia Grigoryevna Kukhtina (1914–2001), was a graduate of the Bolshoi Theatre ballet school and worked as a dancer in music hall productions before dedicating herself to family life after marriage. Tsfasman also had a sister, Adele Tsfasman (1915–1992), who worked as an accompanist at the Gorky Philharmonic.

Tsfasman lived in Moscow for most of his adult life. From 1947 until his death he resided at 1st Tverskaya-Yamskaya Street, Building 20, in the “Masters of Variety” residential building, which housed many artists and performers. In addition to his city apartment, he spent much time at his dacha in the village of Novo-Daryino near Perkhushkovo. There he cultivated an extensive rose garden that became famous among his friends and neighbors. The garden contained many varieties of roses, red, white, yellow, dwarf, and large varieties, and Tsfasman devoted significant time and money to maintaining it. Visitors recalled that he personally worked the soil, collected manure to fertilize the plants, and carefully tended the flowers with the same dedication he showed toward music.

Outside of music, Tsfasman was also known for his athletic interests. He played tennis, table tennis, and football and was a passionate supporter of the Moscow football club Dynamo Moscow. He maintained friendships with several Dynamo players and often attended matches, enthusiastically cheering in the stands. Despite his small physical stature, he was considered energetic and athletic. He also drove a light-colored Volga automobile and was known for his playful personality, sometimes joking with pedestrians or giving rides to strangers.

Tsfasman died on February 20, 1971, in Moscow after suffering heart failure. He was buried at the Vagankovskoye Cemetery in Moscow. After his death, his reputation as one of the leading pioneers of Soviet jazz continued to grow. His recordings have been preserved and released on albums, including the compilation The Tired Sun issued in the Jazz Anthology series in 2000. His centenary was commemorated on December 14, 2006, with a concert in the Column Hall of the House of Unions, where the Saratov Jazz Orchestra “Retro” restored and performed more than thirty original scores from Tsfasman's orchestra. Performances of his music continue to take place, including the musical production Playing Tsfasman, premiered in 2014 at the Moscow International House of Music and later performed at the Moscow Philharmonic.
