= Booknik =

Booknik.Ru
- Website type: Literature & Culture
- Headquarters: Russian Federation
- Owners: SKCG, AVI CHAI Foundation
- Website: http://www.booknik.ru
- Commercial: No
- Launched: July 2, 2006
- Current status: Online

Booknik, Jewish Texts and Themes is an Internet publication in Russian on Jewish literature and culture. Its Editor In Chief is Sergey Kuznetsov. Prominent authors, journalists, literary translators, philologists, Hebraists, historians, etc. are contributing to the resource.

== History ==
Booknik was launched in 2006 by Sergey Kuznetsov Content Group (SKCG) with the financial support of the international AVI CHAI Foundation and The Chais Family Foundation. The original idea was suggested by the AVI CHAI Foundation director for the former Soviet Union David Rozenson. The launching day was July 2, 2006, however Booknik's Birthday is celebrated in July and not tied up to any specific date.

== Ideology ==
Booknik is an interdisciplinary web resource on the Jewish literature and culture in general. According to the official information, “the goal of the project is to use multitudes of examples to demonstrate various trajectories of the national and global cultures’ mutual influence.”

Booknik covers literary and cultural events by placing them into the broad context of the contemporary and classical literatures, as well as the Jewish and Jewish themes-related culture.

Thus, Booknik touches upon many aspects of Jewish and global cultures, ranging from ritual arts to neo-klezmer music, Judeo-Christian polemics to Kabbalah studies, Biblical studies to Reform Judaism, and anti-Semitism to gender studies.

The project originators declare their intentions in this way, “We are as free of religious, political, territorial, language, and other commitments, as we can be, with all due respect to all groups and trends. We are equally interested in both mainstream and marginal aspects of the Jewish culture, in friendly attention and hostile stereotypes.”

== Sections ==
Booknik materials are arranged by genre (in sections), and by theme (in tags). Booknik has seven principal sections:

Books & Reviews: book reviews, and the catalogue of publications covered by Booknik.

Articles & Interviews: analytical materials, interviews with arts and culture luminaries, collections of thematically united materials.

Events & Reports: latest news of Jewish culture in the context of the global culture.

Columns & Columns: thematic and personal columns by the web site contributors.

Stories & Essays: preprints from books, essays, features, translations of poetry and prose, and stories originally written for Booknik.

Contests & Quizzes: the interactive section, including contests, polls, quizzes, tests, etc.

Audio & Video: Booknik's video blog.

== “Booknik Reader” ==
Since November 2007, the hard-copy edition of the resource has been published in the form of 16-pages full-color quarterly newspaper “Booknik Reader.” Since November 2008, its run has been 50 thousand copies. The distribution is free by subscription. The paper is also distributed in Russian and Israeli clubs and bookstores.

== “Booknik Jr.” ==
In August 2008, the “Booknik Jr.” was launched, the web site for children and their parents. The site creators describe it as a resource “about good books, both fresh ones and those we loved when we were kids ourselves. It is also about shows and concerts that could make all of us a little bit better. And we write about different cities and countries where you can travel with all your family, and no one will be bored.”

== “Booknik Show” ==
Several times a year, Booknik arranges “Booknik Shows,” thematic offline events coinciding with significant events of Moscow's cultural and literary life, like the NON/FICTION International Book Fair, the Moscow International Book Fair, the series of club events for the “Read, City” program organized by the Knizhnoye Obozrenie newspaper, etc. Booknik also celebrates its birthday in early July. More often than not, Booknik's events are musical concerts, literary evenings or a combination of the two.

== The Spirit of the Web Site ==
Being the name of the project, Booknik is also the name of a virtual character who writes some materials for the web site. This character is considered the web site's spirit by the project originators.
