= TM Production =

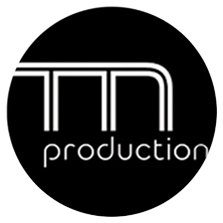
- Company type: Limited liability company
- Founded: 9 April 2009; 17 years ago
- Headquarters: Yerevan, Armenia
- Website: tmproduction.am

TM Production LLC is an Armenian production company founded in 2009 by Thomas Martirosyan, who holds position of General Manager of the company. Company is one of the leading music labels and music production companies in Armenia. Since 2009 the company organizes concerts of different genres and in different formats.

== About the company ==
TM Production provides audio and video production with full cycle: starting from album recording, concert shooting, artist photo shoots, cover design and finishing with CD/DVD manufacturing and distribution. The aim of the company is to present Armenian sacred, folk, classic, rock and jazz music. TM Production collaborates with local artists and does artist management. Company also offers international artists booking.

== Projects ==
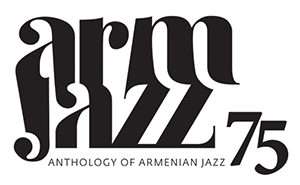
ArmJazz'75

=== Anthology of Armenian Jazz [2015] ===
This anthology encompasses a variation of styles used by the Armenian musicians. It includes recordings of 110 compositions that come in three categories: authors (selected compositions of the Armenian authors) performers, orchestras & bands. Most of the recordings selected in the anthology have been made during concerts rather than in studios. As an exception, performances of our compatriots – outstanding representatives of soviet (Russian) jazz have been included in the anthology. We have a number of Armenian prominent jazz artists living and creating from out of Armenia, and in this light, compilation of the anthology Armenians in the world of foreign jazz is a timely matter too. The authors admit that this anthology it is not as comprehensive as it could be, and probably not all the famed artists have been included in it due to the lack or loss of their recordings. The technical quality of the recordings may not please the fastidious audience either. Nonetheless, this anthology has a number of indisputable benefits. The anthology features a variety of jazz styles including mainstream jazz, Latin jazz, jazz funk, jazz fusion, ethno jazz. Music is available for listening on official website

== Artists ==
- Armen Babakhanian
- Armen Hyusnunts
- Davit Amalyan
- Gevorg Hakobyan
- Hrachya Melikyan
- Jivan Gasparyan
- Jivan Gasparyan Jr.
- Katuner
- Komitas Quartet
- Levon Malkhasyan
- Marine Ales
- Vahagn Hayrapetyan

== Partners ==
- LaserCraft
- Converse Bank Corp
- ArArAt brandy
- Gazprom Armenia
- Tunecore

== Awards ==
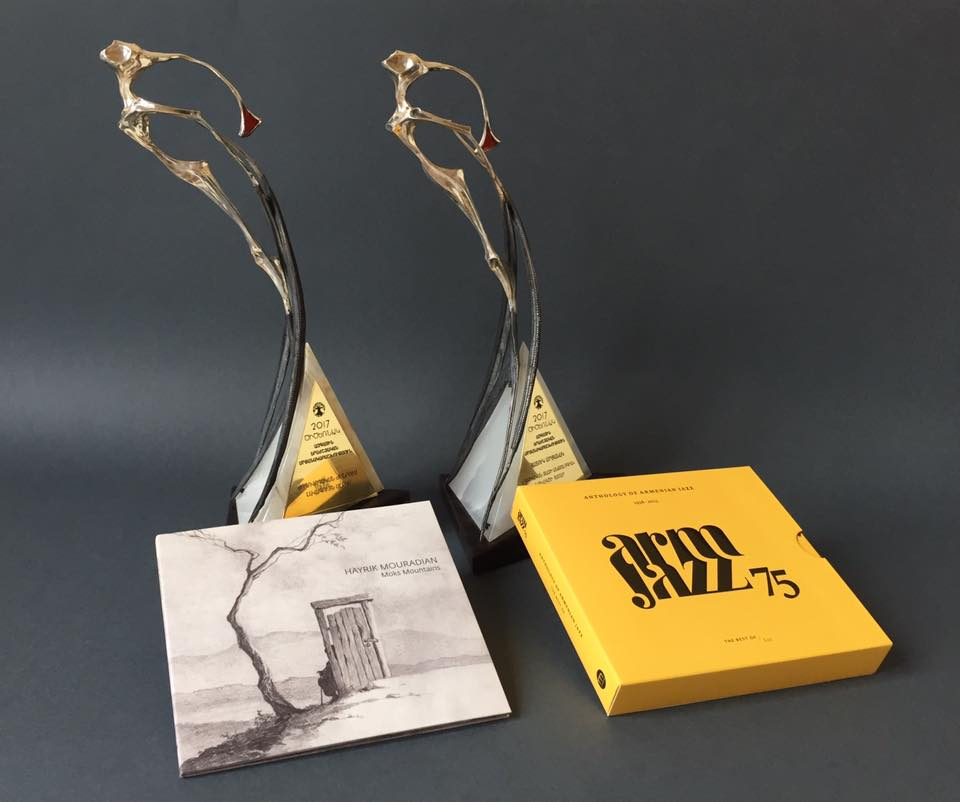
Won two "Swallow" Awards

Five projects of TM Production were nominated for "Swallow" Armenian Music Awards of Ministry of Culture of Armenia on 27 May 2017. "Moks Mountains (Hayrik Mouradian)" CD has won "Best Album in Folk Genre" nomination and "Armenian Jazz Anthology" has won a Special Prize. Also nominated for "Best Classical Album", "Best Folk Album" and "Best Concert Program".
