= Boris Shapiro (poet) =

Russian-born German poet (1944–2026)

- Борис Шапиро
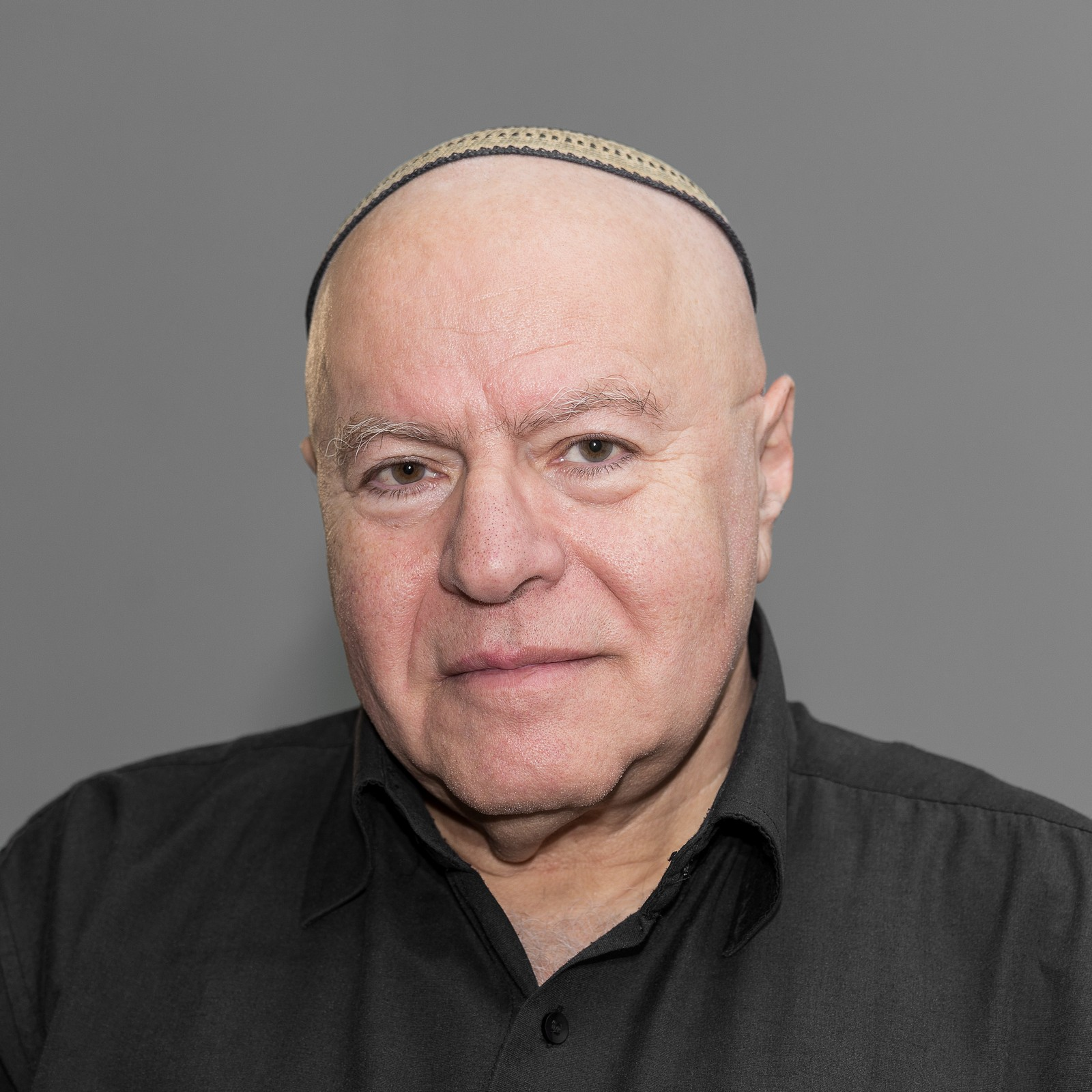
- Shapiro in 2018
- Born: Boris Izrailevich Shapiro; 21 April 1944; Moscow, Russian SFSR, Soviet Union
- Died: 26 July 2026 (aged 82); Berlin, Germany
- Education: Moscow State University
- Occupations: Poet, physicist
- Awards: PLAAS Arts Foundation Prize (Literatur-Stipendium der ART-Stiftung PLAAS, 1984); 2nd International PEN Prize (1998); 2nd Prize of the German Arts Guild (Lyrikpreis der Künstlergilde, 1999); Konrad Adenauer Foundation Prize (Förderpreis der Konrad Adenauer Stiftung, 2000)

Boris Shapiro (Russian: Борис Шапиро; 21 April 1944 – 26 July 2026) was a German poet, physicist, and translator. He was the inventor of a special design of a Pistonless rotary engine called Shapiro Motor.

== Early life and career ==
Boris Izrailevich Shapiro was born in Moscow, Russian SFSR, Soviet Union on 21 April 1944. He studied at Moscow State University Faculty of Physics and then graduated in 1968. During his studies, he organized and led the faculty's poetry group Maple Leaf from 1963 to 1965, which organized two university poetry festivals and founded the Poetic Theater. He got his career in underground Soviet literary circles during the 1960s and early 1970s. He wrote his poet in samizdat. In 1975, he emigrated to Germany, there, he still continued his career in science and poetry.

In 1975, he married for the second time to a German exchange student, after which he left for West Germany. In 1979, he received a doctorate in natural sciences from the University of Tübingen. From 1981 to 1986, he worked in the Department of Theoretical Physics at the University of Regensburg. During his career, he became the organizer of the Regensburg Poetry Readings from 1982 to 1986. Then he became the head of a department at the Institute for Medical and Naturwissenschaftlichen und Medizinischen Institut at the University of Tübingen, and director of the Coordination Headquarters for Scientific and Technological Cooperation between Germany and the Koordinationsstab fur Wissenschaftliche und Technologische Kooperation mit den GUS-Landern.

In 1990, he founded the Wissenschaft-Technologie-Kultur society, which supports writers and artists, organizes readings and exhibitions, publishes poetry collections, and conducts seminars and conferences. He has translated poetry from German by Friedrich Hölderlin, Paul Celan, Hilde Domin, Herta Müller, and many more poets.

== Death ==
Shapiro died in Berlin on 26 July 2026, at the age of 82.
