= Valentina Kuznetsova =

Russian polar researcher and skier

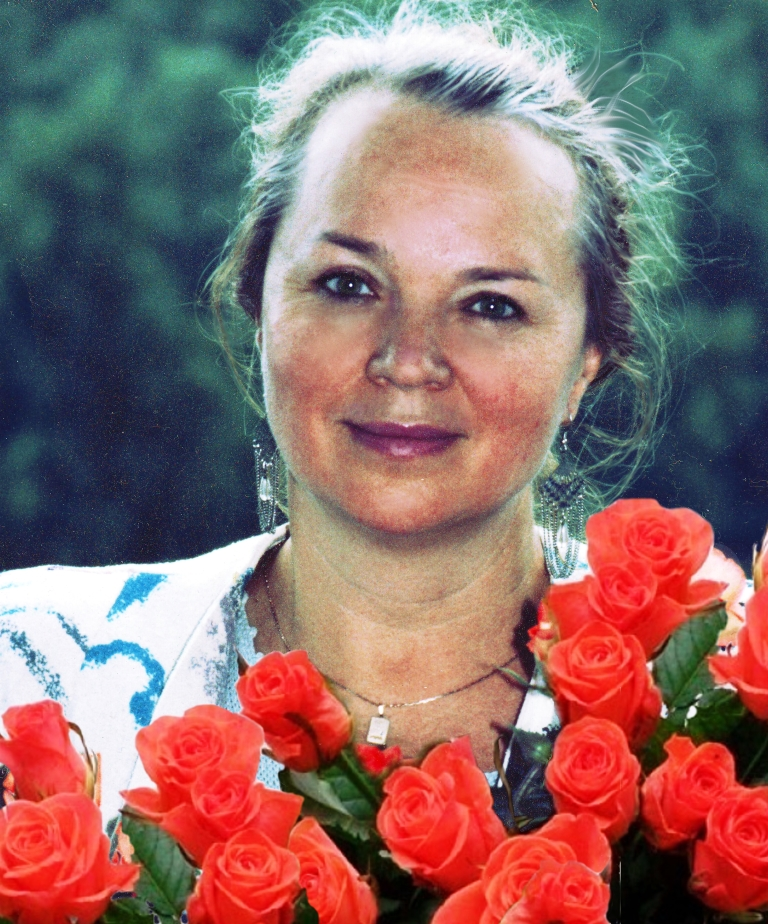
Valentina Kuznetsova

Valentina Mikhailovna Kuznetsova (Russian: Валентина Михайловна Кузнецова; 21 January 1937 - 3 September 2010) was a Soviet - Russian radio technician and polar researcher.

== Biography ==
Kuznetsova was born in Moscow and worked as an architect-technician in the Gipropischtscheprom. She studied radio at Moscow Aviation Institute. She was a member of the national ski team, and trained with Alevtina Kolchina.

In 1966, Kuznetsova founded the ski group Metelitsa (Snowstorm). She led a polar expedition.
