= Yuri A. Kuznetsov =

Russian-American mathematician

Yuri A. Kuznetsov is a Russian-American mathematician currently the M. D. Anderson Chair Professor of Mathematics at University of Houston and Editor-in-Chief of Journal of Numerical Mathematics.
