= Sergey Kuznetsov (writer) =

Russian writer, journalist and entrepreneur (born 1966)

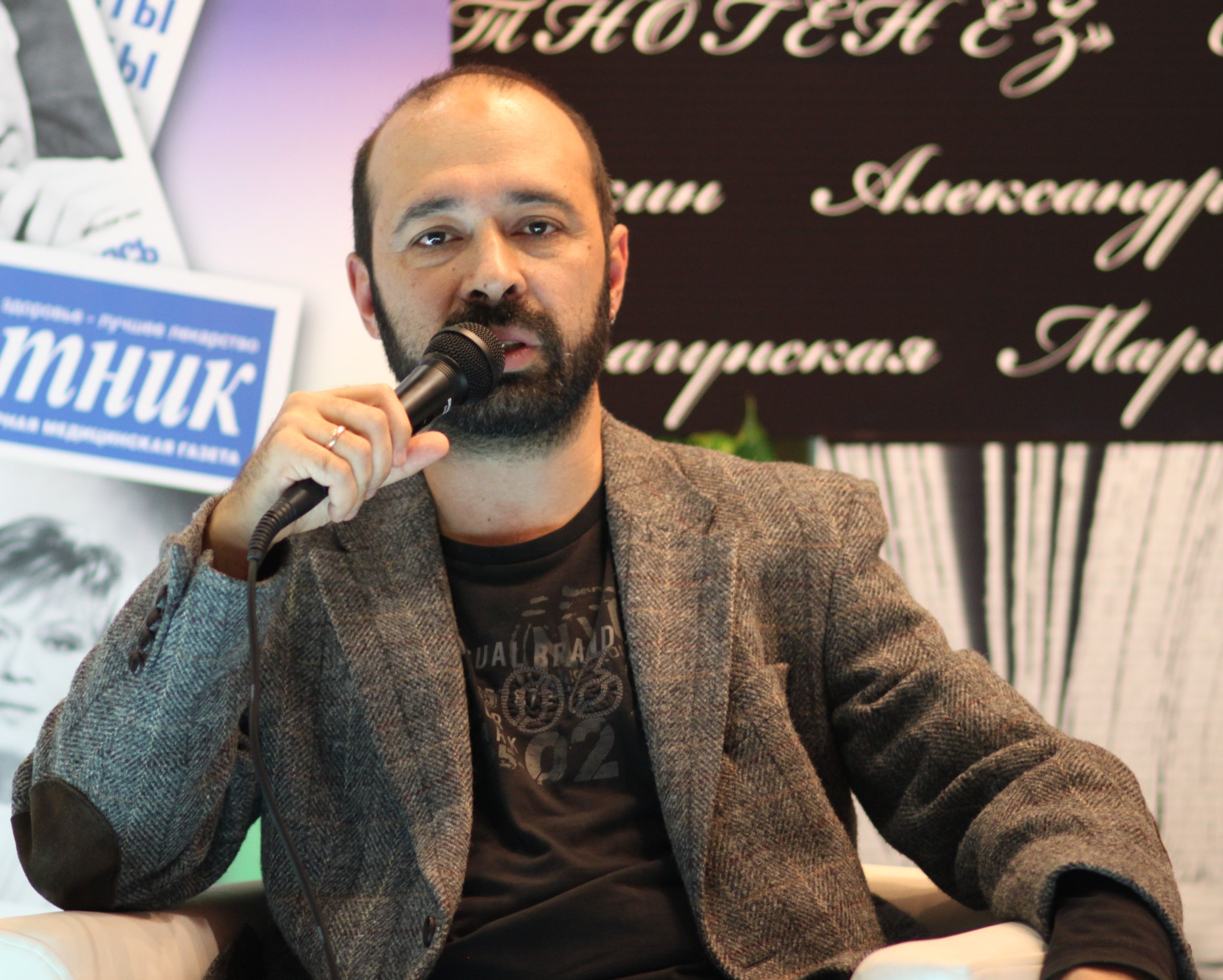
- Kuznetsov in September 2010
- Born: 14 June 1966; Moscow, Russia
- Occupations: Writer, journalist, entrepreneur, educator
- Website: www.skuzn.ru

Sergey Yurievich Kuznetsov (Russian: Сергей Юрьевич Кузнецов; born 14 June 1966) is a contemporary Russian writer, journalist, entrepreneur and educator.

== Early life ==
Kuznetsov was born in Moscow to Galina Kuznetsova, a French language and French literature teacher, and Yuri Kuznetsov, a well-known Soviet/Russian chemist. In 1988, Kuznetsov graduated from Moscow State University's Department of Chemistry.

== Career ==
=== Literary career ===
Butterfly Skin was translated into English, German, French, Polish, Hungarian, Czech, Dutch, and other languages. The publishers called it a Russian take on Silence of the Lambs, but critics pointed out that Kuznetsov "aims for more than smug nihilism. He delivers a gratifying conclusion to a sometimes overburdened and sickening journey through sadism and alienation."

His novel The Round Dance of Water was translated into Arabic and English. The book was published in the US in July 2022 by Dalkey Archive Press.

His most recent novel, Kaleidoscope: Expendable Materials, received praise from both readers and critics. Lisa Hayden, a recognized literary translator, wrote: ‘What I enjoy is reading about upheaval and how it affects and even connects characters that pop in and out of the chapters like pieces in a kaleidoscope".

Member of PEN Club and Russian Union of Cinematographers.

=== Journalism ===
In 1996 he started to write articles on pop culture for various magazines and online media. After returning from Stanford to Russia in 2002, Kuznetsov continued to work in journalism.

Kuznetsov took part in forming post-Soviet independent journalism in Russia, focusing mainly on movies and literature. He contributed to Russian editions of Premiere, Harper's Bazaar, Vogue and other magazines. He participated in multiple online projects.

In 2006, he launched Booknik, a daily online project on Jewish literature and culture that took a hard-copy quarterly form from 2007 to 2013, called Booknik Reader. In 2011, as editor-in-chief of the publication, Kuznetsov was awarded Man of the Year 5771 by the Federation of Jewish Communities of Russia.

Kuznetsov is a semi-regular contributor to American periodicals, including The New York Times, The Huffington Post and others.

=== Entrepreneur ===
In 2004, Kuznetsov and his wife Ekaterina Kadieva founded a digital marketing agency called SKCG (an acronym for Sergey Kuznetsov Content Group), aimed at developing and supporting social media projects. The company had offices in Kyiv, Ukraine as well as Paris, France and in the United States; international clients include Nike, Audi, Nokia, Estée Lauder, Efes, Jeep, Bosch and other major corporations. The company was shut down after Russia's massive invasion of Ukraine in 2022

=== Educator ===
In 2014, Kuznetsov and his wife Ekaterina founded Marabou Science Camp, an educational project for Russian children in Europe. In 2021 the first Marabou camp was launched in the USA.

In 2016 Sergey and Ekaterina launched a Science & Vacation Program aimed at explaining science to an adult audience. Financial Times called it "a company that specialises in luxury learning with a scientific bent". One of S&V's first events was dedicated to neurophysics of scents. The lectures are legendary perfume critic Luca Turin and parfum blogger Victoria Frolova.

In 2018, Sergey, together with Ekaterina, launched the international middle school Le Sallay Academy, based on a blended learning model of a combination of on-site sessions and online classes. In its English-language publication, Forbes called this school "pioneers of blended education for pre-teens". Relocate Magazine shortlisted Le Sallay Academy in Relocate Award 2022 as a School excellence for relocation & transition care.

In 2020, the Russian branch of the school, Le Sallay Dialogue, was opened, in 2022 the US branch, Le Sallay Discovery, was open.

== Personal life ==
Kuznetsov married Inna Kuznetsova in 1987. The couple divorced in 1993. In 1995, he married psychologist Ekaterina Kadieva. He has three children: Ekaterina (born in 1987), Anna (born in 1996) and Daniel (born in 2001).

He has lived in Paris since 2013.

== Political views ==
Sergey Kuznetsov has consistently opposed Russia's invasion of Ukraine

In March 2014, he signed the letter “We are with you!” in support of Ukraine

In 2022, he has repeatedly spoken out against the war unleashed by Russia and expressed support for Ukraine, including signing a letter to Le Monde and making statements online.

As the founder of Le Sallay Academy school and Camp Marabou, Sergey provides scholarships for free education and recreation for Ukrainian refugee children. On April 28, 2026, Sergei Kuznetsov announced the start of legal bankruptcy proceedings against Le Sallay Academy school and its closure.

== Recognition ==
In 2001, he received a Knight Fellowship from Stanford University and moved to the U.S. state of California for a year.
