= Garik Saribekyan =

- Born: 26 April 1970; Yerevan, Armenia
- Genres: jazz fusion, ethno jazz
- Occupation(s): composer, musician
- Instrument: piano

Garik Saribekyan (born 26 April 1970 in Yerevan, Armenia) is a composer and musician, band lead and founder of Nuance Jazz Band. Garik is widely regarded as one of the most notable characters on the Armenian jazz stage, and has been named Honourable Culture Contributor of Yerevan in 2014.

== Early life ==
Garik Saribekyan was born in a family of musicians and has become familiar to musical instruments since early age. His father, now Honoured Artist of Armenia, has noticed his outstanding feeling of rhythm when Garik used to tap rhythmic beat sequences on a chair, who, at that time was nearly as tall as the chair itself. Due to this, many predicted his musical career as a drummer. Luckily, his music teacher gave him freedom to express and develop in the direction that he felt most passionate about.

Also, Garik used to listen to his father play on tar, which influenced his music in future to contain ethnic elements.

== Education ==
1977-1984 Garik attended Yerevan Musical Secondary School after Edward Mirzoyan - piano classroom and graduated with excellence.

1988-1993 attended Yerevan state conservatoire after Komitas piano composition department and earned Graduation diploma.

== Career ==
Garik's talent was quickly noticed, which enabled him to participate in various musical projects since 1993, playing piano in Yerevan's most popular music clubs (Mezzo, Kami, Malkhas, Retro music club, Yan's), in various official and private events in different Armenian regions, as well as in Nagorno-Karabakh Republic, Russia, Georgia, Iran, Doha and Sydney, Australia.

In 2008 Garik Saribekyan founded a jazz band called "Why Not". The group divided soon after creation, however rapidly gaining popularity in a short period of time, and having recorded 3 singles.

Garik Saribekyan's compositions have been included in a range of albums and works

- Live in Sydney (Garik Saribekyan, Zara Markosyan, George Mangasaryan) recorded by the A.G.B.U Alexander Primary School, 2013
- Autumn Yerevan - Garik Saribekyan, Arm Jazz, executive producer Thomas Martirosyan, 2012
- Soundtrack for "My Little Prince" art-house movie by Armen Ronov, nominated for Golden Apricot (Yerevan International Film Festival) in 2012
- Yarimo - Nuance Jazz Band, Sazz&Jazz Armenian Ethno album, dedicated to the 300th Anniversary of Sayat-Nova, recorded at S'HARMONY music studio, general producer Ruben Jaghinyan, 2013
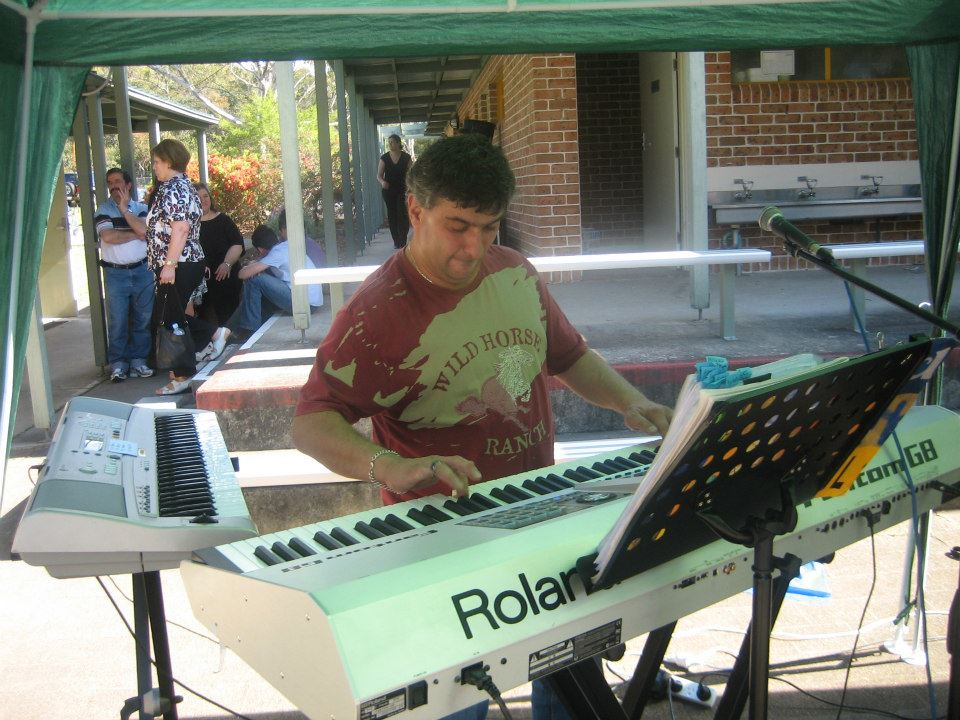
  Garik Saribekyan performing outside AGBU Alexander Primary School, Sydney, Australia, 2013

In 2009 Garik founded Nuance Jazz Band. The band is well known for successfully experimenting with qanun in their jazz compositions.

The band members are Garik Saribekyan (piano and keyboard), Suren Zakaryan (bass guitar), Albert Ordinyan (percussion), Ruzanna Kirakosyan (canon), Artur Yeghiazaryan (saxophone), Aleksandr Grigoryan (drums).

On 30 April 2014 during the celebration of International Jazz Day in Yerevan, Garik Saribekyan was awarded the title of Honourable Culture Contributor of Yerevan by mayor of the city, Taron Margaryan.

== Personal life ==
Garik is married since 1990, has two children.
