= Oleg Kuznetsov (geophysicist) =

Russian geophysicist (born 1938)

- Олег Кузнецов
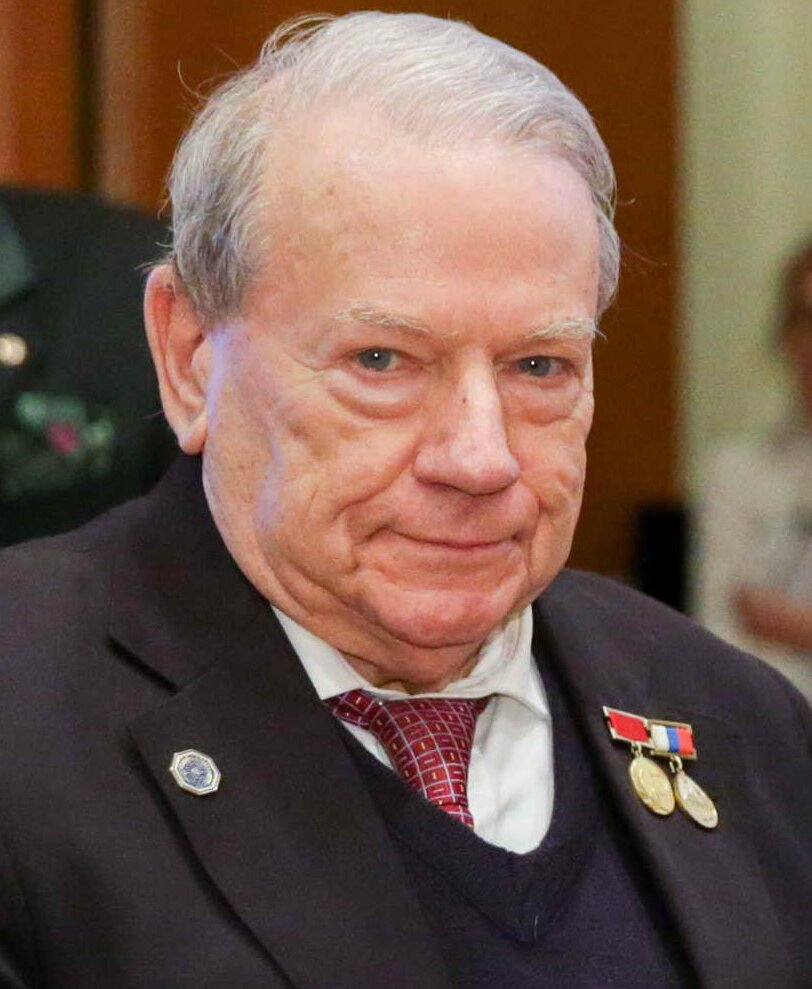
- Kuznetsov in 2017
- Born: 29 August 1938 (age 88); Moscow, Russia
- Education: Russian State Geological Prospecting University; Moscow State University
- Occupation: Geophysicist

Oleg Leonidovich Kuznetsov (born 29 August 1938) is a Russian geophysicist. He is a full member of the Russian Academy of Natural Sciences and has served as its president since 1993.

Kuznetsov was born in Moscow, the son of Xenia Petrovna and Leonid Kuznetsov. Kuznetsov attended the Russian State Geological Prospecting University, graduating in 1962 from the Geophysical Faculty. He then attended Moscow State University, graduating in 1967 from the MSU Faculty of Physics. Kuznetsov worked at the Institute of Geology and Combustible Mineral Development, and was director and head of the All-Russian Research Institute of Geological, Geophysical and Geochemical Systems of the Ministry of Geology. Kuznetsov was a founder of the Russian Academy of Natural Sciences, and has served as its president since 1993.

Kuznetsov has been awarded the USSR State Prize, Order of Honour and the title of the Honored Worker of Science and Technology of the RSFSR. He was also granted the Russian Federation Presidential Certificate of Gratitude in 2002. Kuznetsov has received honorary titles from universities and is an honorary member of the Association of Hungarian Geophysicists.
