= Serhiy Kuznetsov (footballer, born 1963) =

Ukrainian footballer

Personal information
- Full name: Serhiy Vasylyovych Kuznetsov
- Date of birth: 1 January 1963 (age 63)
- Place of birth: Belgorod, Russian SFSR
- Height: 1.83 m (6 ft 0 in)
- Position: Defender

Youth career
- –1976: Salyut Belgorod
- 1976–1980: KhOShISP Kharkiv

Senior career*
Years	Team	Apps	(Gls)
1980–1987	Metalist Kharkiv	165	(1)
1988–1990	Chornomorets Odesa	70	(2)
1991	Metalurh Zaporizhya	9	(1)
1991–1993	Ferencváros	48	(7)
1994	KAMAZ Naberezhnye Chelny	13	(0)
1995–1996	Ferencváros	35	(5)
1997	Gázszer FC	4	(0)

International career
1983	Ukrainian SSR		

Managerial career
- 1999–2000: Csongrádi FC
- * Club domestic league appearances and goals

Sergei Vasilievich Kuznetsov (Ukrainian: Сергій Васильович Кузнєцов; Russian: Серге́й Васильевич Кузнецов; born 1 January 1963) is a Ukrainian former professional footballer who played as a defender.

== Club career ==
Kuznetsov made his professional debut in the Soviet First League in 1981 for Metalist Kharkiv. He played two games in the UEFA Cup 1990–91 for Chornomorets Odesa.

In 1983 Kuznetsov took part in the Summer Spartakiad of the Peoples of the USSR in the team of Ukrainian SSR.

== Personal life ==
His son Serhiy Kuznetsov is also a former football player.

== Honours ==
- Soviet Cup: 1987–88 (played in the early stages of the tournament for FC Metalist Kharkiv)
- USSR Federation Cup: 1990
- USSR Federation Cup finalist: 1987
