= Alexey Yakovlevich Kuznetsov =

Soviet engineer (1910–1969)

Alexey Yakovlevich Kuznetsov (Russian: Алексей Яковлевич Кузнецов; 1910 – 1969) was a Soviet engineer, Hero of Socialist Labor (1961).

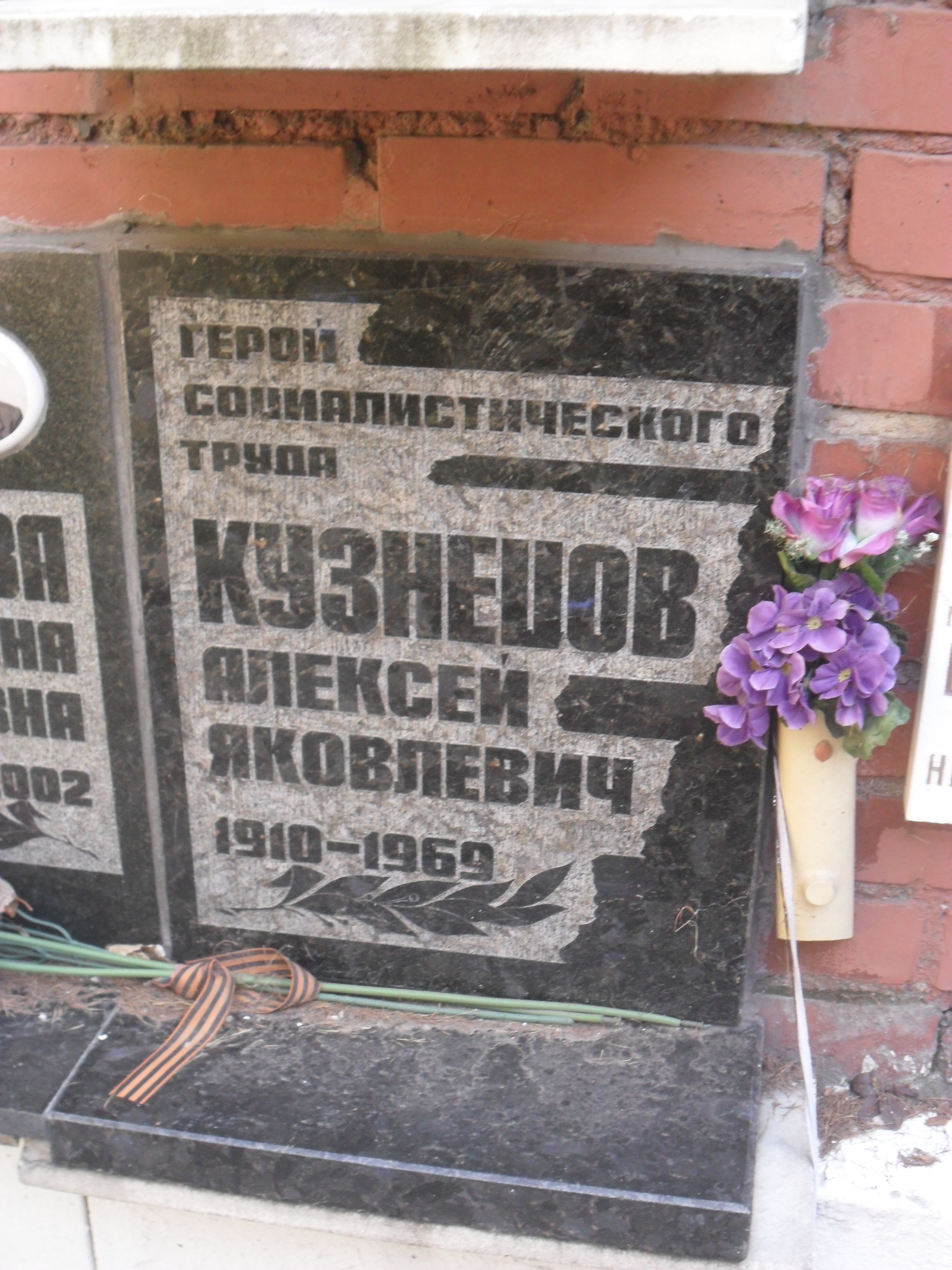
Stove columbarium at Novodevichy Cemetery in Moscow

== Biography ==
Alexey Kuznetsov was born in 1910 in Moscow. He graduated from high school, Rabfak and Moscow Power Engineering Institute. Since 1933 he worked on the construction of Moscow Canal.

He took an active part in the construction of the Uglich and Rybinsk power plant and waterworks, flooding large areas of Rybinsk Reservoir. Since 1956, Kuznetsov was the chief engineer of construction management Stalingradgidrostroy. Under his leadership, carried out the construction of the Stalingrad (now - the Volga Hydroelectric Station) hydropower plant.

Presidium of the Supreme Soviet of the Soviet Union on September 9, 1961, for Alexey Kuznetsov was awarded the title of Hero of Socialist Labor with delivery Order of Lenin and medal Hammer and Sickle.

Since 1962, Kuznetsov served as Deputy Head of the Department of construction of energy facilities of the Ministry of Energy and Electrification of the USSR. Soon, he was sent to Egypt, the chief engineer of construction management, is engaged in construction Aswan Dam. In 1968, he fell ill and went to Moscow for treatment. He died a few months later there in 1969.
