= Aleksey Kuznetsov (actor) =

Russian actor (1941–2023)

Aleksey Glebovich Kuznetsov (Russian: Алексей Глебович Кузнецов; 14 May 1941 – 5 July 2023) was a Soviet and Russian actor and director, Honored Artist of the RSFSR (1985). He was known for his roles in The Green Flame, D'Artagnan and Three Musketeers, where he played Duke of Buckingham, and Dark Eyes.

== Biography ==
Kuznetsov was born 14 May 1941, in Moscow. In 1964 he graduated from the Boris Shchukin Theatre Institute and in the same year was accepted into the troupe of the Yevgeny Vakhtangov State Academic Theatre, where he worked for more than 55 years, until the end of his life. He had good vocal abilities and owned the guitar.

In 1967 he was invited to the department of acting as a teacher, and in 1995 – to the department of stage speech of the Boris Shchukin Theatre Institute as a teacher of artistic reading.
