= Moscow State University Faculty of Physics =

Faculty of Moscow State University

Coordinates: 55°42′00″N 37°31′46″E

The Fizfak (Faculty of Physics) of Moscow State University is a faculty of Moscow State University. It was established in 1933. The dean of the faculty is Nikolay Sysoev.

The faculty of Physics includes 7 divisions. The faculty's staff consists of about 1400 employees. About 2,480 students are enrolled in undergraduate and graduate programs.

== Departments of the faculty ==
- Department of experimental and theoretical physics
- Department of the physics of solid bodies
- Department of radiophysics and electronics
- Department of nuclear physics
- Department of geophysics
- Department of astronomy
- Department of additional educating programs

== Notable alumni ==
=== Nobel winners ===
- Igor Tamm (Nobel Prize in Physics, 1958)
- Ilya Frank (Nobel Prize in Physics, 1958)
- Lev Davidovich Landau (Nobel Prize in Physics, 1962)
- Andrei Sakharov (Nobel Peace Prize, 1975)
- Vitaly Ginzburg (Nobel Prize in Physics, 2003)
- Alexei Alexeyevich Abrikosov (Nobel Prize in Physics, 2003)

=== Physicists ===
- Sergei Kurdyumov
- Stanislav Mikheyev
- Dmitry Shirkov
- Alexei Smirnov
- Igor Ternov
- Sergei Tyablikov
- Sergey Vavilov
- Anatoly Vlasov
- Georgiy Zatsepin
- Dmitry Zubarev
- Roald Sagdeev
- Andrei Linde
- Alexei Starobinsky
- Rem Khokhlov
- Oleg Leonidovich Kuznetsov
- Slava Turyshev
- Boris Shapiro

=== Educationists ===
- Georgy Shchedrovitsky

=== Businessmen ===
- Oleg Deripaska
- Yuri Milner

=== Artists ===
- Natalia Sokol
