= Lyubov Kuznetsova =

Lyubov A. Kuznetsova (Russian: Любовь Алексеевна Кузнецова; 1928 – 22 February 2008) was a Russian calligrapher and font designer.

The official digital version of the Literaturnaya font was developed at ParaGraph in 1996 by her.

Kuznetsova died on 22 February 2008.
