= Nuance Jazz Band =

- Genres: Ethno jazz
- Years active: 2009-present
- Members: Garik Saribekyan; Arik Babayan; Ruzanna Kirakosyan; Albert Ordinyan; Artur Yeghiazaryan; Gevorg Charchyan
- Website: http://www.nuancejazzband.com

Nuance Jazz Band is an Armenian ethnic jazz sextet active since 2009. Founded and led by Garik Saribekyan, Nuance is one of the most recognised and ethnically sounding bands on Yerevan jazz stage.

== History ==
Nuance Jazz Band was founded in 2009 by Garik Saribekyan.

Former band lead and founder of jazz/rock band “Why not” Garik Saribekyan was looking for a new sound, and his passion towards Armenian National music inspired the creation of “Nuance” - an ethno jazz band, featuring piano, bass guitar, drums, qanun, percussion, saxophone.

Garik's love towards national instruments was inspired by his father - tar player and conductor, currently Honored Worker of Art of the Republic of Armenia.

=== Early years ===
Initial repetitions with bass guitar and the wish to experiment - bringing qanun on their stage set the essence and future musical development of the band.

First time on stage in Alibi club the band was recognized as one of the most innovative and ethnically sounding tune on the Yerevan jazz stage.

Soon after the initial success, Alibi shut down, and the band was invited to play in Mezzo Classic House Club, one of the best places to listen to local music. The partnership with Mezzo Club lasted until late 2015.

== Events and awards ==
Nuance Jazz Band has been a regular guest (2012–2015) at annual International Jazz Festival in Yerevan, held on April 30, on the International Jazz Day.

Nuance Jazz Band has been a frequent guest at events of governmental level, including

- Multiple public events organized by Russian Embassy
- The Celebration of the Birthday of Queen, in UK Embassy in 2012
- 2013-2016 Annual Italian Cuisine Festival in Yerevan, organized by Italian Embassy in Armenia, with guests including The Ambassador of Italy, France, Great Britain
- Multiple private events

Nuance has also performed concerts in Cafesjian Center for Arts in Yerevan.

In 2015, Nuance won “The Best Jazz Composition of the Year” award by local radio station Radio Van, with their composition called “Zartonq”.

In 2016 April, Nuance has performed a concert for the Aurora Prize nominees in Mezzo Classic House Club.

== Repertoire ==
Nuance Jazz Band performs compositions of Komitas, Tsovak Hambardzumyan along with Armenian folk music, jazz standards and compositions by Garik Saribekyan.

== Personnel ==
- Garik Saribekyan – piano and keyboard
- Arik Babayan – bass-guitar
- Albert Ordinyan – percussion
- Ruzanna Kirakosyan – qanun
- Artur Yeghiazaryan – saxophone
- Gevorg Charchyan – drums
