= Alexander Kuznetsov (mathematician) =

Russian mathematician (born 1973)

- Born: November 1, 1973 (age 52)
- Education: Moscow State School 57; Moscow State University
- Awards: EMS Prize (2008)
- Scientific career
- Fields: Mathematics
- Workplaces: National Research University – Higher School of Economics; Steklov Institute of Mathematics
- Doctoral advisor: Alexei Bondal

Alexander Gennadyevich Kuznetsov (Russian: Александр Геннадьевич Кузнецов, born November 1, 1973) is a Russian mathematician working at the Steklov Mathematical Institute and the Interdisciplinary Scientific Center J.-V. Poncelet, Moscow, and head of the Laboratory of Algebraic Geometry and its Applications of the Higher School of Economics. He graduated from Moscow State School 57 in 1990. He received a Ph.D. in 1998 under the supervision of Alexei Bondal. Kuznetsov is known for his research in algebraic geometry, mostly concerning derived categories of coherent sheaves and their semiorthogonal decompositions.

Kuznetsov received an August Möbius fellowship in 1997. He was awarded a European Mathematical Society prize in 2008. He was an invited speaker at the International Mathematical Congress in Seoul (2014). Kuznetsov is a Professor of the Russian Academy of Sciences (RAS), corresponding member of the RAS (elected in 2016).

== Selected publications ==
- Kuznetsov, Alexander (2007). "Homological projective duality". Publications Mathématiques de l'IHÉS. 105 (1): 157–220. arXiv:math/0507292. doi:10.1007/s10240-007-0006-8.
- Kuznetsov, Alexander (2011). "Base change for semiorthogonal decompositions". Compositio Mathematica. 147 (3): 852–876. arXiv:0711.1734. doi:10.1112/S0010437X10005166.
- Kuznetsov, A. G. (2009). "Derived categories of Fano threefolds". Proceedings of the Steklov Institute of Mathematics. 264: 110–122. arXiv:0809.0225. doi:10.1134/S0081543809010143.
- Kuznetsov, Alexander (2008). "Derived categories of quadric fibrations and intersections of quadrics". Advances in Mathematics. 218 (5): 1340–1369. arXiv:math/0510670. doi:10.1016/j.aim.2008.03.007.
