= Artur Kuznetsov (Russian footballer) =

Russian footballer

Personal information
- Full name: Artur Fyodorovich Kuznetsov
- Date of birth: 4 October 1972 (age 54)
- Place of birth: Sochi, Russian SFSR
- Height: 1.71 m (5 ft 7 in)
- Position: Midfielder

Youth career
- DYuSSh-7 Sochi
- RO UOR Rostov-on-Don

Senior career*
Years	Team	Apps	(Gls)
1990	FC Shakhtyor Shakhty	4	(0)
1991–1993	FC Zhemchuzhina Sochi	39	(2)
1993	→ FC Torpedo Adler	1	(0)
1994	FC Lokomotiv Nizhny Novgorod	6	(0)
1995–2000	FC Zhemchuzhina Sochi	122	(7)
1995–1998	→ FC Zhemchuzhina-2 Sochi	7	(5)
2001	FC Neftekhimik Nizhnekamsk	19	(0)
2002	FC SKA Rostov-on-Don	10	(0)
2003	FC Zhemchuzhina Sochi	9	(0)
2004	FC Sochi-04 (amateur)		
2008–2009	FC Adler Sochi		

International career
1993	Russia U-21	1	(0)
- * Club domestic league appearances and goals

Artur Fyodorovich Kuznetsov (Russian: Артур Фёдорович Кузнецов; born 4 October 1972) is a Russian former professional footballer.

== Club career ==
He made his professional debut in the Soviet Second League B in 1990 for FC Shakhtyor Shakhty.
