= Konstantin Orbelyan =

- Կոնստանտին Օրբելյան
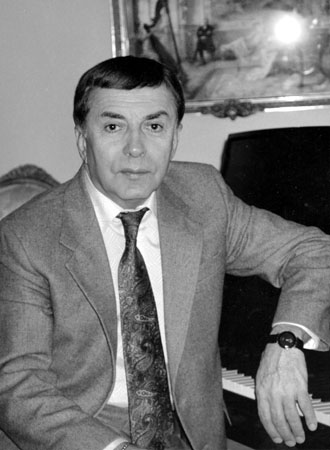
- Born: July 29, 1928; Armavir, North Caucasus Krai, Russian SFSR, Soviet Union
- Died: April 24, 2014 (aged 85); Los Angeles, California, U.S.
- Occupations: Composer; pianist
- Title: People's Artist of the USSR (1979); People's Artist of the Armenian SSR (1972)
- Musical career
- Genres: Jazz; Chamber music; Estrada
- Instrument: Piano

Konstantin Aghaparonovich Orbelyan (Armenian: Կոնստանտին Օրբելյան; Russian: Константин Агапаронович Орбелян; July 29, 1928 – April 24, 2014) was an Armenian pianist, composer, head of the State Estrada Orchestra of Armenia.

He was awarded People's Artist of the USSR in 1979. Other positions held by him included the board member of the Union of Soviet Composers, Armenian Composer's Union secretary since 1983, and the Vice-President of All-Soviet Musical Society of the USSR. He was the uncle of his namesake Constantine Orbelian.

== Discography ==
- "Государственный эстрадный оркестр Армении п/у Константина Орбеляна" (1968)

=== As composer ===
- "Birch Whispers" (Russian: Шум берёз), sung by Dmitri Hvorostovsky on the 2005 Delos Records compilation "Moscow Nights" (conducted by Constantine Orbelian).
