= Inna Kuznetsova =

- Инна Кузнецова
- Born: Inna Anatolyevna Kuznetsova; 1968 (age 57–58); Moscow, Russian SFSR, USSR
- Citizenship: Russia; United States
- Education: Moscow State University (MS; PhD); Columbia Business School (MBA)
- Occupation: Businesswoman
- Organization(s): IBM; INTTRA Marketplace; Sage Group
- Known for: the only vice president of Russian origin at IBM headquarters in the United States

Inna Anatolyevna Kuznetsova (Russian: Инна Анатольевна Кузнецова; born 1968) a Russian-American business executive who has served as the chief executive officer (CEO) of ToolsGroup from May 2022 to March 2025. She was named among the top 25 Tech CEOs of Boston (https://www.thekeyexecutives.com/2024/10/22/the-top-25-tech-ceos-of-boston-for-2024/) in 2024 by Key Executives and got top women in Supply Chain award for 4 years in a row.

She serves on two corporate boards, Freightos (NASDAQ: CRGO), a shipping marketplace and SaaS company, where she chairs the Compensation Committee since 2022, and SeaCube, a PE-backed leading container leasing company, where she chairs the Innovation & Technology Committee.

https://www.freightos.com/leadership-and-governance/

https://www.freightos.com/press-release/freightos-to-raise-growth-capital-and-become-public-via-business-combination-with-gesher-i-acquisition-corp/

https://seacubecontainers.com/boardofdirectorsappointment/

Formerly, she was CEO of 1010data, which she joined as COO in July 2019. Inna Kuznetsova also serves as Independent Non-Executive Director of Freightos (NASDAQ:CRGO). In the past she was the President & COO of INTTRA until its successful acquisition by E2open at the end of 2018; Chief Commercial Officer of CEVA Logistics; and before that, IBM vice president of sales and marketing, Systems Software.

She also previously served on boards of directors of Global Ports Investments PLC (LSE:GLPR) and Sage Group.

Inna graduated from the faculty MSU CMC (1990). and received an MBA from a business school at Columbia University in 2005. She started working in the Russian branch of IBM (since 1993). Head of one of the sales sectors (since 1996). She worked in the IBM office in the United States (since 1997). She was engaged in developing markets and an internal startup IBM Life Sciences. She led the IBM business in Linux (since 2007). Vice President of Marketing and Sales of System Software (2009) – the first Russian vice president at IBM headquarters.

In 2011, in Moscow, the publishing house «Mann, Ivanov and Ferber» published Inna's book «Up! A practical approach to career growth».https://www.goodreads.com/book/show/19368562-up-the-practical-approach-to-career-growth

In 2013, in Moscow, the publishing house Mann, Ivanov and Ferber published Inna's book A month in the sky. Practical notes on the ways of professional growth. https://www.goodreads.com/book/show/18489927-reaching-for-the-moon

== Literature ==
- Inna Kuznetsova (2010). Up! Practical approach to career growth. Moscow: Mann, Ivanov and Ferber. ISBN 978-5-91657-144-8.
- Inna Kuznetsova (2013). A month in the sky. Practical notes on the ways of professional growth. Moscow: Mann, Ivanov and Ferber. ISBN 978-5-91657-821-8.
