= Serhiy Kuznetsov (footballer, born 1982) =

Ukrainian footballer (born 1982)

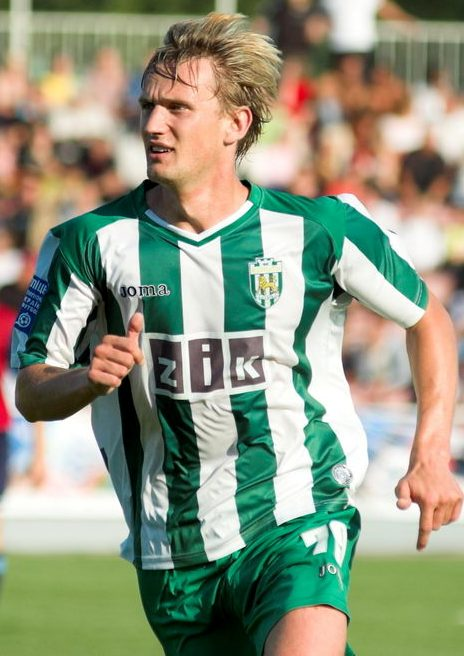
- Kuznetsov with Karpaty Lviv in 2009

Personal information
- Full name: Serhiy Serhiyovych Kuznetsov
- Date of birth: 31 August 1982 (age 44)
- Place of birth: Kharkiv, Ukrainian SSR
- Height: 1.89 m (6 ft 2 in)
- Position: Forward

Youth career
- 1991–2000: Ferencváros

Senior career*
Years	Team	Apps	(Gls)
2000–2001	Jokerit	7	(3)
2001–2003	Ferencváros	12	(4)
2002	→ Erzsébeti Spartacus (loan)	3	(1)
2003	→ Oradea (loan)	9	(7)
2003	Gomel	11	(5)
2004	Sheriff Tiraspol	24	(13)
2005	Vorskla Poltava	12	(0)
2005	Illichivets Mariupol	0	(0)
2006	Vėtra	33	(18)
2007–2008	Nosta Novotroitsk	45	(12)
2008–2011	Karpaty Lviv	55	(22)
2010	→ Alania Vladikavkaz (loan)	10	(1)
2012–2014	Sevastopol	48	(39)
2014–2015	Hoverla Uzhhorod	2	(0)
2016	Metalist Kharkiv	0	(0)
2018	Balkany Zorya	9	(0)
Total		280	(125)

International career
	Ukraine U21	6	(2)

Managerial career
- 2018: Arsenal Tula (assistant)
- 2018–2019: Spartak Moscow (assistant)
- 2019: Spartak Moscow (caretaker)
- 2020–2022: Panathinaikos (assistant)
- 2022–2024: Diósgyőr
- 2024: Győr
- * Club domestic league appearances and goals

Serhiy Kuznetsov (Hungarian: Kuznyecov Szergej; Ukrainian: Сергій Сергійович Кузнецов; born on 31 August 1982) is a Hungarian (of Russian descent) football coach and a former player who played as a forward and is a manager. He is a son of another footballer Serhiy Kuznetsov. He was registered with the Russian league as a Hungarian citizen.

== Playing career ==
Kuznetsov began his footballing career in the Hungarian club Ferencváros, the club his father, also Serhiy Kuznetsov, joined in 1991 from Chornomorets. Serhiy Kuznetsov, a highly athletic striker, was noticed by the Professional Finnish side Jokerit in 2000, in which club Kuznetsov began his professional career. When playing in the Lithuanian premier league club FK Vėtra, Kuznetsov became the top scorer in the Lithuanian League, netting 19 goals in 42 appearances. In Nosta, Kuznetsov became the second highest scorer for the club in 2007. After the start of the 2008–09 season in the Ukrainian Premier League, Kuznetsov signed a 2.5-year contract with the Ukrainian Premier League side FC Karpaty Lviv.

Kuznetsov has also played for the Ukrainian national youth football team.

== Coaching career ==
Kuznetsov started his coaching career as an assistant to Oleg Kononov (who coached Kuznetsov previously for Sheriff, Karpaty and Sevastopol) in Russian clubs FC Arsenal Tula and FC Spartak Moscow. On 29 September 2019, following Kononov's resignation as Spartak manager, he was appointed caretaker manager for Spartak. He left Spartak after permanent manager Domenico Tedesco was appointed on 14 October 2019.

=== Diósgyőr ===
On 24 August 2022, he was appointed as the manager of Nemzeti Bajnokság II club Diósgyőri VTK. He led the club to promotion to Nemzeti Bajnokság I. On 31 January 2024, he was sacked.

=== Győr ===
On 24 February 2024, he was appointed as the coach of Nemzeti Bajnokság II club Győri ETO FC.

== Personal life ==
He is the son of footballer Serhiy Kuznetsov who in 1983 represented Ukraine at the Spartakiad of the Peoples of the USSR.

== Managerial statistics ==
As of 14 April 2024

Team	Nat	From	To	Record							
Team	Nat	From	To	P	W	D	L	GF	GA	GD	W%
Spartak Moscow (caretaker)	(Russia)	29 September 2019	13 October 2019	1	0	0	1	1	2	−1	0.0
Diósgyőr	(Hungary)	24 August 2022	31 January 2024	53	35	6	12	105	59	+46	66.0
Győr	(Hungary)	24 February 2024		7	4	0	3	11	7	+4	57.1
Total				61	39	6	16	117	68	+49	63.9

== Honors ==
- Veikkausliiga: runner-up 2000
- Hungarian National Championship I: 2003; third place 2001, 2002
- Hungarian Cup: 2003
- Belarusian Premier League: 2003
- Moldovan Premier League: 2004
- A Lyga third place: 2006

Individual

- A Lyga top scorer: 2006
- Nosta second top scorer: 2007
- Nemzeti Bajnokság I Head coach of the Month: August 2023
