= Aleksey Kuznetsov (guitarist) =

Russian composer and guitarist

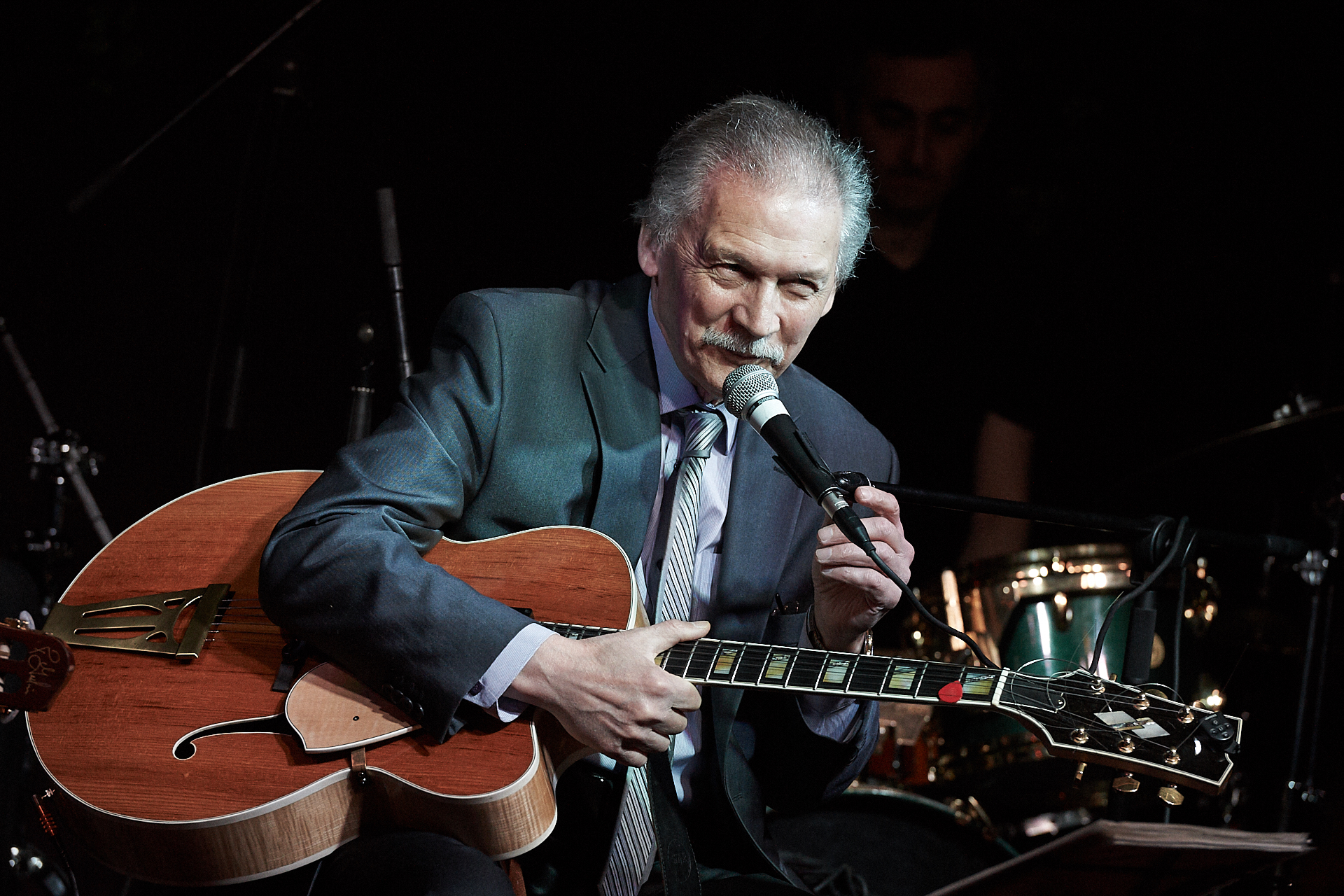
- Kuznetsov in 2018
- Born: 6 September 1941 (age 84); Chelyabinsk, Russian SFSR, Soviet Union
- Education: Moscow State Pedagogical University

Aleksey Kuznetsov (born 6 September 1941) is a Russian guitarist, composer, and guitar pedagogue. Mainly known as a jazz guitarist on the international stage, he has also worked as a classical musician. He is the author of Iz praktiki dzhazovogo gitarista (From the practice of a jazz guitarist; 1993), an instructional book for aspiring jazz guitarists.

== Life and career ==
In 1962, he graduated with a music performance degree from the Moscow State Pedagogical University. He has since played throughout Russia/USSR, India, and Eastern Europe as both a soloist and ensemble member at major music festivals and concert venues. In the 1990s, he toured regularly as a trio with saxophonist Georgy Garanian and pianist Daniil Kramer. He also formed and led the jazz quartet Jazz-Accord whose members also included accordion player Vladimir Danilin, pianist Lev Kushnir, and double bassist Anatoly Sobolev. With Jazz-Accord, he has performed many times on Russian television, including appearances with guest musicians Igor Bril and German Luk’yanov. Kuznetsov is the grandson of Marshal of the Soviet Union Alexander Ilyich Yegorov.
