= Georgy Garanian =

Russian composer

Georgy Aramovich Garanian (Armenian: Գէորգի Գարանեան, Russian: Гео́ргий Ара́мович Гараня́н; 15 August 1934 – 11 January 2010) was an ethnic Armenian Russian jazz saxophone player, bandleader and composer. He was the People's Artist of Russia in 1993.

Born in Moscow, Garanian was trained at the Moscow Conservatory. He was one of the first Russian musicians who attracted the attention of the Western world as part of the jazz from the USSR. He belonged to the first generation of Russian jazzmen who started to perform after World War II. As a musician (alto saxophone), conductor and composer he was the leader of the country's best big bands: Melodia (1970s–1980s) and Moscow Big Band (1992–1995). He led the Municipal Big Band in the Southern Russian city of Krasnodar. He toured regularly as a trio with pianist Daniil Kramer and guitarist Aleksey Kuznetsov during the 1990s.

Garanian recorded more music than any other jazz musician in Russia, performed at many international jazz festivals (Finland, India, Indonesia, Cuba etc.), toured Germany, the United States, Japan, Australia, Sweden, France, Taiwan and many other countries. Frederick Starr wrote in his book about Russian jazz that Garanian is one of the best jazz musicians in Russia. Starr quoted famous American critic John Hammond, who heard George at the jazz festival in Prague, Czechoslovakia, — "Georgy Garanian is phaenomenal". And person number one in jazz, Willis Conover, the host of "Voice of America" jazz program, invited him many times to participate at International jazz festivals in Hungary, Yugoslavia and other countries. In the year 2000 Garanian was nominated to the Grammy Award as a conductor of the famous Tchaikovsky orchestra for the double CD album "Oregon in Moscow", which had been made together with renowned American jazz group Oregon and produced by Pat Metheny Group's Steve Rodby. In September 2004 on the main Square of Russia founded a pavement Star in honour of George Garanian as the sign of absolute recognition and gratitude for his contribution into Russia culture.

Georgy Garanian was always one of the most "sought after" musicians in Russia. He was the only jazz performer who granted the privilege to perform 4 concerts annually at Moscow Conservatory Great Hall (the most renowned classical venue in East Europe).

In March 2010 Georgy Garanian Fund released the album "Jazz in Tuxedos" that was recorded by suddenly gone in January Maestro George Garanian with "Moscow virtuosi" Chamber Orchestra and classical pianist Denis Matsuev. All the tracks in the album "Jazz in Tuxedos" suggest unique arrangements, that are originally made by Garanian. Practically in every track there is George Garanian's alto sax solo and he is the conductor always. CD became popular right after it had come out as well as the new version of George Garanian's legendary manual "Basic foundation of variety and jazz arrangement".

He died from cardiac arrest in Krasnodar on 11 January 2010 at the age of 75.
