= Moscow State School 57 =

Moscow School 57
- New logo of The Moscow School 57, redesigned in 2019

Location
- 7/10 Maly Znamensky Lane; Moscow 119019; Russia
- 55.748616°N 37.605134°E

Information
- Type: State school
- Established: 1877; 149 years ago
- Principal: Anna Vakhneeva
- Faculty: 123.3 (on FTE basis)....
- Grades: 1st–11th
- Enrollment: 1,100 (as of 2014–15)
- Website: sch57.ru

Moscow State School 57 (Russian: Пятьдесят седьмая школа) is a public school located in the Khamovniki District of Moscow, Russia. The school was founded in 1877 and is best known for its specialized secondary program in mathematics and its alumni.

== History ==
=== Founding and School 4 (1877–1968) ===
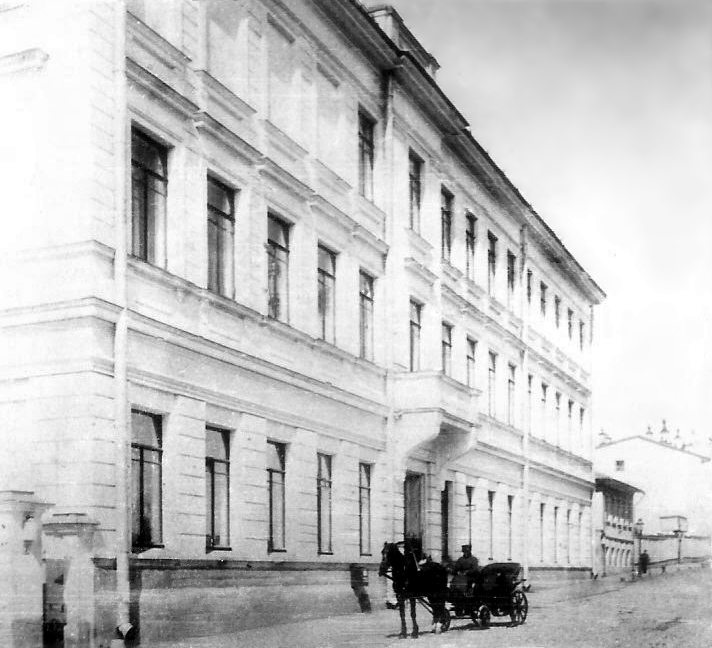
The school circa 1877.

In 1877, Karl Masing, a Russian engineer and educator, founded a realschule in Maly Znamensky Lane, which soon became one of the most progressive vocational schools in Russia.

After the October Revolution, the realschule was converted into a boarding school with courses in aesthetic arts and renamed to School 4. It became popular with the Soviet establishment, with top government officials sending their children there.

In 1936, the school was transformed again, converting back to a vocational school and acquiring the number 57 in Moscow's educational system.

=== Math classes and new campuses (1968–present) ===
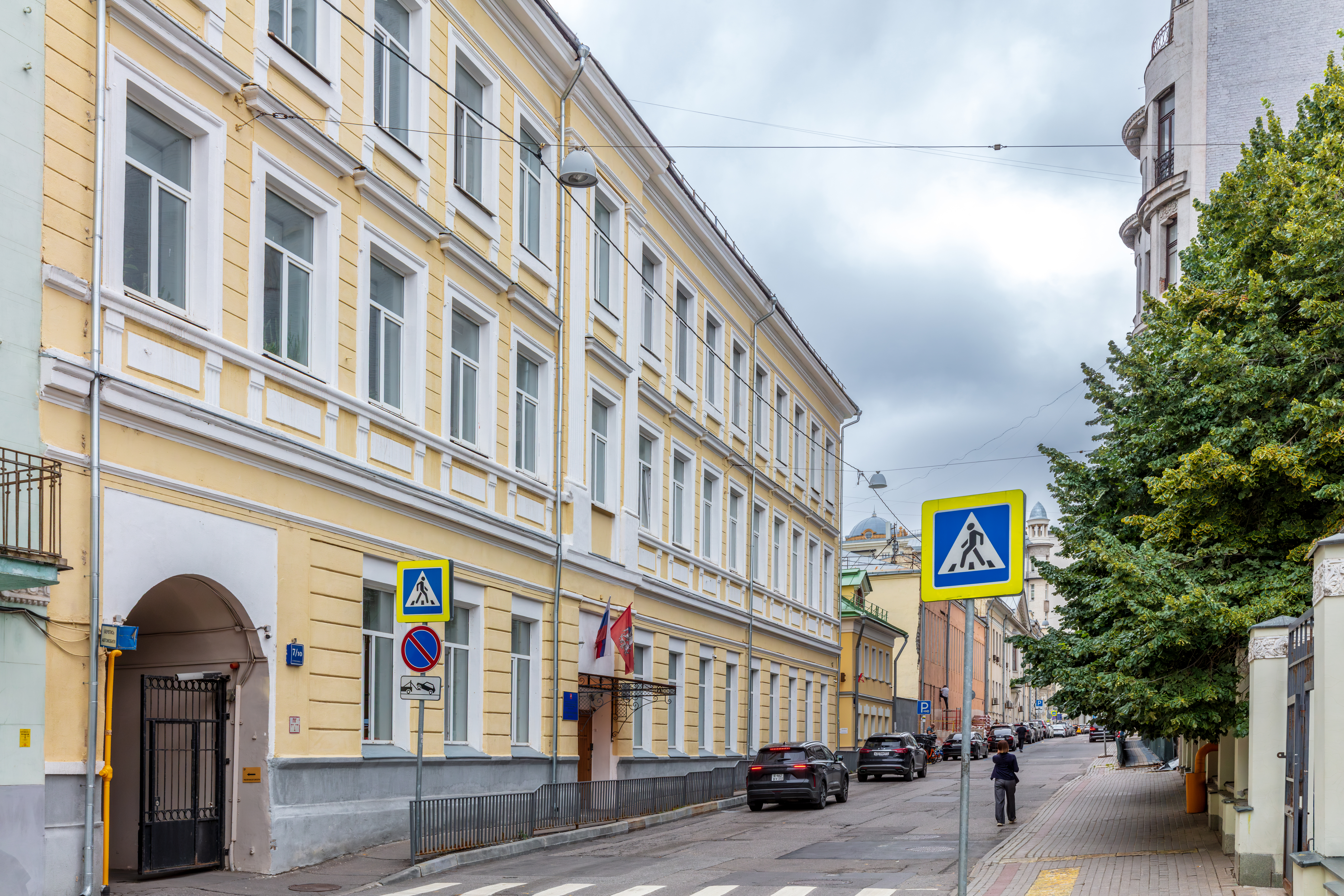
School 57 today

In 1968, Nikolay Konstantinov, a Russian educator in mathematics, established specialized math classes at the school. Konstantinov's teaching methodology still is used in these classes to this day and has been shared with other educational centers.

The high school offers specializations in humanities, biology, and mathematics, as well as a general track. In 2008–2013, the school merged with two other schools in different locations of the Khamovniki District of Moscow, in conformity with recent reforms in educational policy.

== Enrollment ==
The school has a total enrollment of over a thousand students, entering first, eighth and ninth grade.

Admission to elementary school is competitive and based on test results of the students previously enrolled in the school's tuition-based mandatory preschool program. In 2015, the admission committee considered over a thousand applicants for 130 positions. By maintaining good standing the students can guarantee their further education in the school's general track middle and high school.

School 57 has general track classes along with its specialized programs and holds a separate admission process for specialized classes in mathematics, humanities and biology, a joint project of the school and the Faculty of Bioengineering and Bioinformatics of Moscow State University. The admission committee considers a few hundred applicants for 20–25 places in each class.

School 57 launches two math classes each year, with four- and three-year curriculums, each admitting around 20–25 students who have demonstrated the best problem-solving abilities during the application process. The school organizes free preparatory courses that help interested students to develop said abilities. A portfolio that includes prizes from math competitions can strengthen an application.

== Academics ==
Students in the specialized classes receive extensive training in their areas of expertise, often covering college-level material in their junior and senior years. Graduates of the specialized classes often go on to pursue college degrees in Russia's best universities, including the Higher School of Economics, Moscow State University, and the Moscow Institute of Physics and Technology.

=== Physics classes ===
One of the faculties in the school. The specialists in STEM subjects work with students from 8th to 11th grade to prepare them for the All-Russian Olympiad of schoolchildren. The academic curriculum includes calculus (differentiation, integration, number theory, etc.), advanced mechanics, optics, molecular theory as well as the English language for academic purposes.

=== Mathematics classes ===
Individual approach lies in the core of the specialized math classes' educational process. Teaching the specialized math classes isn't limited to faculty staff – additional instructors, many of whom are volunteering alumni, are involved in order to give every student necessary attention. Rather than having to learn the material from a textbook, students discover it through solving sequences of problems. Solutions are presented by the students to the instructors in one-on-one discussions. This method, introduced by Konstantinov, proved to be effective and was adopted by other educational institutions in both Russia and abroad, including School 179, the Independent University of Moscow and the Faculty of Mathematics at Higher School of Economics. Several School 57 teachers have also written textbooks that follow the method.

== Awards and recognition ==
Classical logo of The Moscow School 57, designed in 1984 by students

The school is consistently ranked among the top 10 Russian schools. In 2016, school 57 was ranked fourth in Moscow by the Moscow Department of Education and fifth in Russia by Uchitelskaya Gazeta (Teacher's Newspaper), the leading educational periodical in Russia. Several teachers from the school received honorary awards, including the President's award. The school was also awarded grants by the George Soros' Open Society Foundations and the American Mathematical Society. In 2016, fifteen students of the school received awards of the All-Russian Mathematical Olympiad.

== Extracurricular activities ==
School 57 offers a number of free courses for middle schoolers preparing students who intend to apply to the mathematics, humanities and biology classes. The math program includes weekly problem solving sets for sixth-, seventh- and eighth-graders, some of the courses are published. The biology track includes lectures in math, biology and chemistry for eighth graders, and future humanities students study literature and history. The school also offers a course preparing for TOEFL and IELTS standardized English tests.

Class vacations, including those involving intense work (lectures, presentations, field trips), are popular in the school, though not mandated by the administration. Math classes usually tend to have mountain hiking journeys, while humanities classes organize urban trips, focusing on cultural and historical studies. Since 1996 the school worked together with the Tauric Chersonese museum to organize volunteers from the number of students and alumni to work and learn on different archaeological sites in the area.

=== Open Oral Maths Olympiad ===
School 57 holds an annual math competition for sixth and seventh graders from Moscow schools, sometimes accommodating more than 300 students. During the competition, students interact with professors, as well as mathematics graduate and postgraduate students of Moscow universities. The competition consists of two rounds and a series of lectures on various subjects by school teachers and alumni professors.

=== Summer Мath Сamp ===
Since 2012, the school has been hosting a mathematical summer camp for high school students, where university professors offer a number of introductory courses in different areas of college level mathematics. School 57 students are admitted automatically, students of other Moscow schools receive a spot in the camp based on results of a competition. The Summer Мath Сamp is jointly organized by the school, the Higher School of Economics and Yandex. In 2016, the Summer Мath Сamp had 15 courses and 80 students. The topics covered in the camp's course include the Young tableau, knot invariants and Schubert polynomials. Students who have the School 57 math camp's honors certificate have a better chance at getting into the Higher School of Economics.

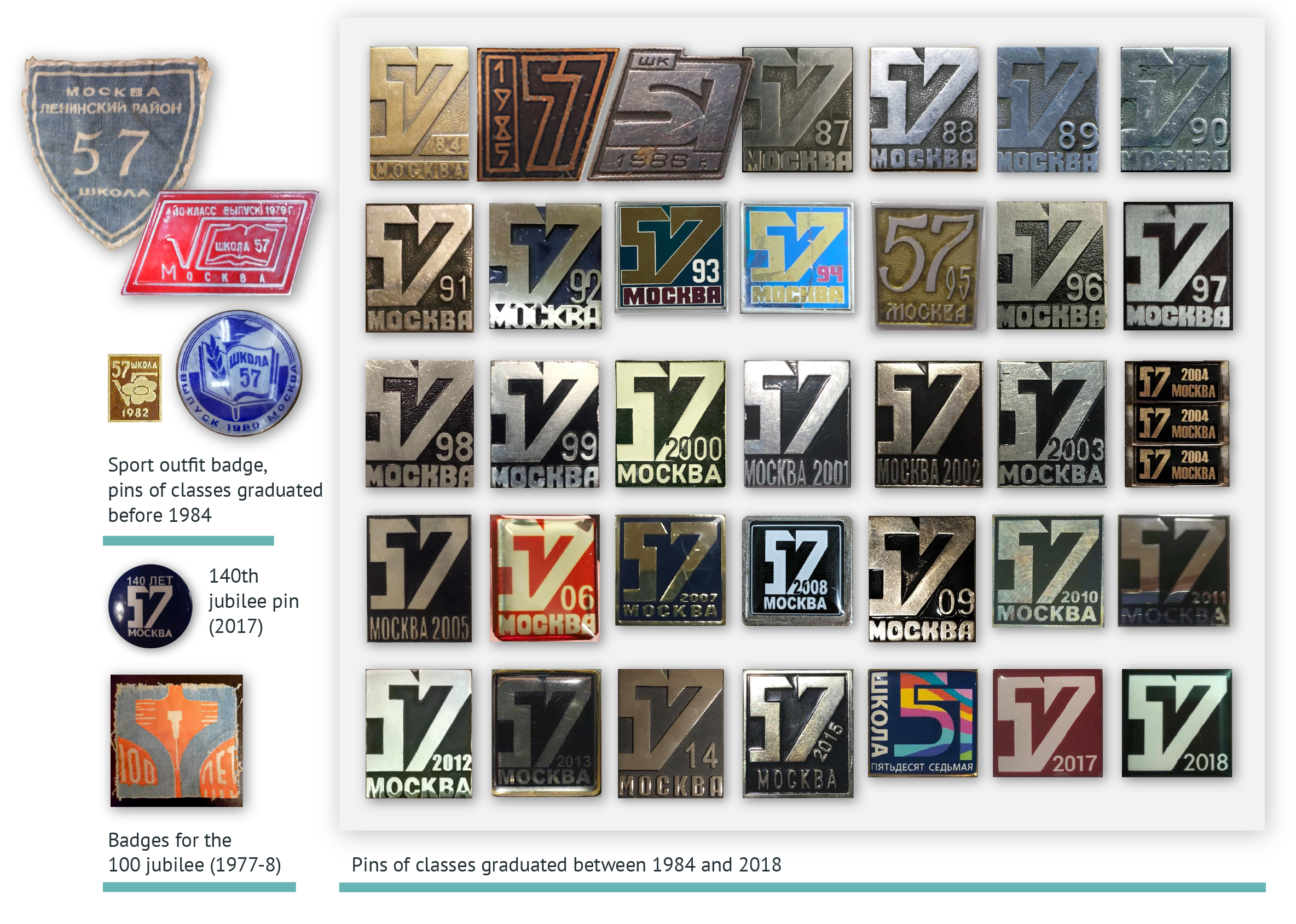
Collection of graduation pins and badges of Moscow School 57 from 1970s to 2018

=== Lectorium ===
In September 2016, a series of lectures by notable alumni was launched in a joint effort by the school's alumni and students' parents. Lectures take place in all three buildings of the school, the speakers include Alexander Barulin and Anatoly Starostin.

=== Logo ===
Classical School 57 logo contains a mathematical root symbol hidden in its counterform.

== Notable people ==
=== Alumni ===
Among the notable alumni, most work in the field of mathematics. However, the list also contains well-known scholars in other disciplines, as well as politicians, businessmen, and public figures.

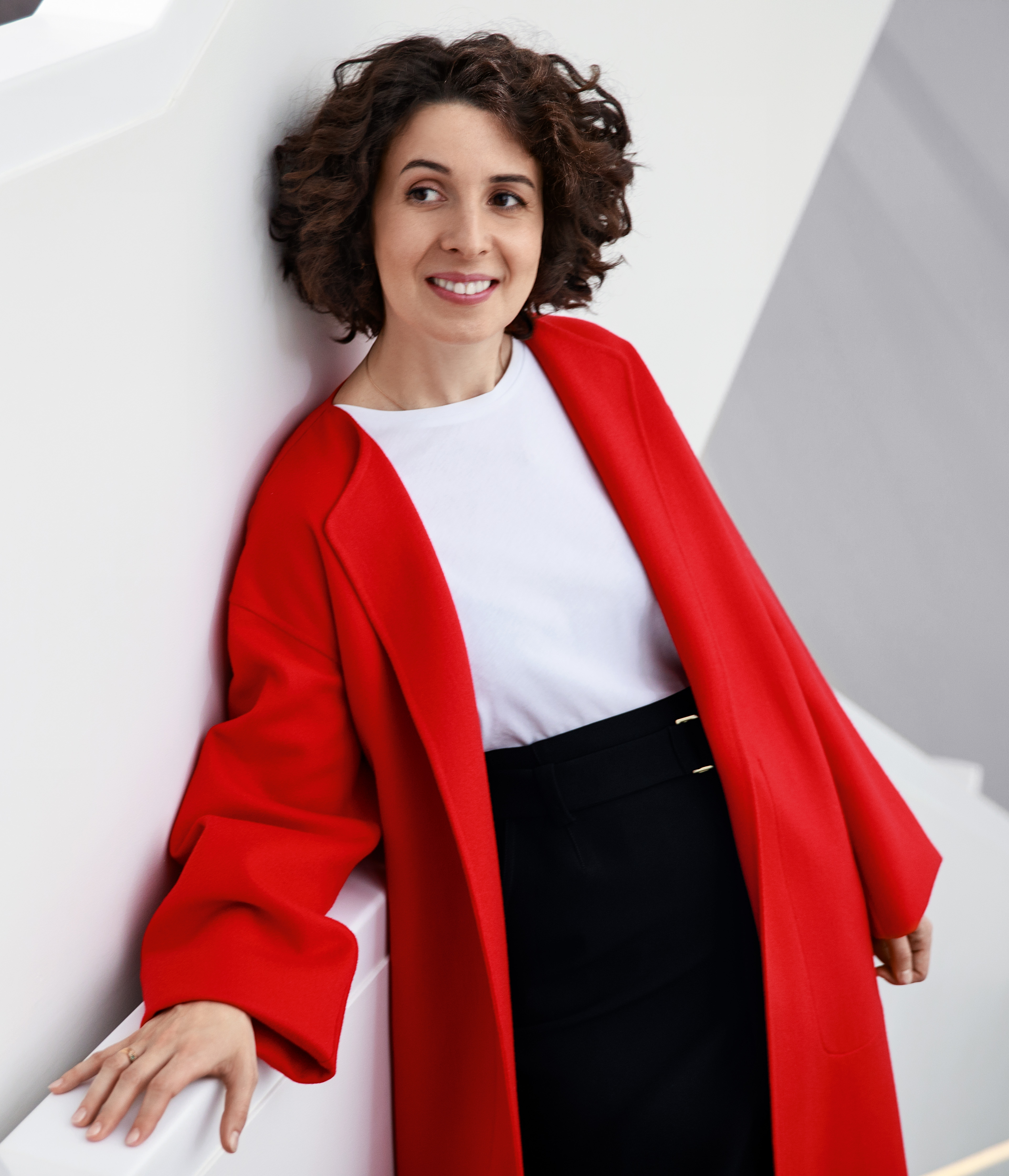
Elena Bunina

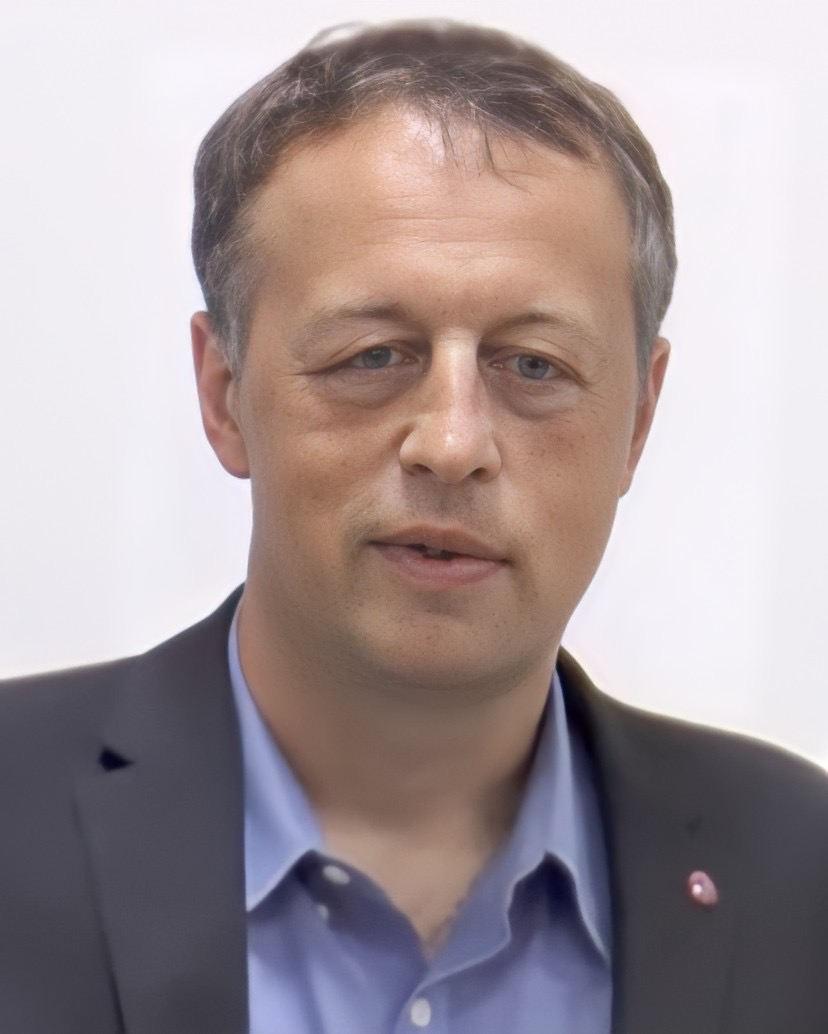
Konstantin Sonin

- Vitaliy Arnold (1968-2017), leader in mathematics education
- Pavel Bardin (born 1975), film director, screenwriter and producer
- Boris Barkas (1953–2007), poet, songwriter, author of songs for Alla Pugacheva and Mashina Vremeni
- Valentin Baryshnikov, editor of Radio Free Europe/Radio Liberty
- Roman Bezrukavnikov (born 1973), mathematician, professor at the Massachusetts Institute of Technology
- Alexei Bondal (born 1961), mathematician
- Alexandre Bouzdine (born 1954), theoretical physicist, professor at the University of Bordeaux
- Maxim Braverman (born 1966), mathematician
- Grigory Bubnov (born 1970), economist, president of Moscow Technological Institute
- Elena Bunina (born 1976), mathematician, professor at Bar Ilan University former head of Yandex in Russia
- Dmitry Dolgopyat (born 1972), Russian-American mathematician, professor at the University of Maryland, College Park
- Ruben Enikolopov (born 1978), economist, former rector of New Economic School.
- Alex Gerko (born 1979), founder of XTX Markets, a trading firm.
- Mark Greenberg (translator) (born 1953), interpreter, winner of the Andrei Bely Prize
- Mikhail Kalyakin (born 1963), director of the Zoological Museum of Moscow University
- Mikhail Kapranov (born 1961), mathematician, professor at University of Tokyo
- Azim Karimov (born 1991), conductor
- Tatyana Kasatkina (born 1963) philosopher, philologist
- Anna Kashina, writer, author of The Princess of Dhagabad
- Andrey Khazin (born 1969), rector of Russian State Social University
- Yegor Kholmogorov (born 1975), publicist.
- Mikhail Khovanov (born 1972), mathematician, professor at Johns Hopkins University
- Alexander Klyachin (born 1967), entrepreneur and investor.
- Andrey Kozarzhervsy (1918–1995), philologist, professor of Moscow State University
- Ekaterina Krongauz (born 1984), journalist
- Alexander Kuznetsov (born 1973), mathematician, professor at the Higher School of Economics
- Artemy Lebedev (born 1976), designer, founder of the design company Art. Lebedev Studio
- Mikhail Levandovskii (born 1972), a four time world champion in What? Where? When?
- Ernst Lissner (1874–1941), painter
- Sergei Lukianov (born 1963), biochemist, president of Russian National Research Medical University
- Alexander Lvovsky (born 1973), physicist and educator
- Yuri Mahlin (born 1969), physicist, professor at the Higher School of Economics
- Vladimir Matetsky (born 1952), composer and producer
- Alexander Mezhirov (1923–2009), poet
- Roman Mints (born 1976), violinist
- Petr Mitrichev (born 1985), competitive programmer
- Maksim Moshkow (born 1966), public figure
- Vadim Moshkovich (born 1967), businessman and philanthropist
- Nikolai Nadirashvili (born 1955), mathematician, professor of Aix-Marseille University
- Nikita Nekrasov (born 1973), physicist, professor at Stony Brook University
- Mikhail Ostrovskiy (born 1979), economist, professor at Stanford Graduate School of Business
- Igor Pak (born 1971), mathematician, professor at the University of California, Los Angeles
- Nikolai Pertsov (1924-1987), scientist
- Iosif Polterovich (born 1974), mathematician, professor of the Université de Montréal
- Viktor Przhiyalkovsky (born 1982), mathematician
- Kirill Reshetnikov (born 1975), poet
- Leonid Reyzin, computer scientist, professor at Boston University
- Valery Rubakov (born 1955), physicist
- Alexei Savvateev (born 1973), educator, popularizer of mathematics
- Irina Shostakovskaya (born 1978), poet, winner of the Andrei Bely Prize
- Vera Serganova (born 1961), mathematician, professor at the University of California, Berkeley
- Konstantin Sonin (born 1972), economist, professor at the University of Chicago
- Maxim Sonin (born 1998), writer
- Georgiy Starostin (born 1976), linguist
- Anton Suvorov (born 1973), economist, rector of New Economic School
- Yana Tokareva (born 1976), poet, philologist, interpreter
- Askar Tuganbaev (born 1977), businessman, creator of Rutube
- Misha Verbitsky (born 1969), mathematician, professor at IMPA
- Mikhail Voloshin (born 1953), theoretical physicist, professor at the William I. Fine Theoretical Physics Institute
- Alexander A. Voronov (born 1962), mathematician, professor at the University of Minnesota
- Olga Zondberg (born 1972), poet
- Anton Zorich (born 1962), mathematician, professor at the Institut de mathématiques de Jussieu – Paris Rive Gauche

=== Faculty ===
The schools faculty includes a mathematician and professor Alexander Shen, an educator, geometer, author of several geometry textbooks Rafail Gordin, director of the Moscow Center for Continuous Mathematical Education, head of development of Unified State Exam Ivan Yashchenko.

Former faculty includes poet and novelist Igor Vishnevetsky, mathematician and Soviet dissident Tatyana Velikanova, biologist, founder of the biological classes at School 57 and other Moscow schools Galina Sokolova.
