= HSE Faculty of Mathematics =

Russian business school institute

The Faculty of Mathematics (FM) at the National Research University Higher School of Economics (Russian: факультет математики Национального Исследовательского университета «Высшая Школа Экономики») was founded in 2008 jointly by the Higher School of Economics (HSE) and the Independent University of Moscow (IUM). It offers Bachelor of Science program “Mathematics” (in Russian), Master of Science program “Mathematics” (in English), Master of Science program “Mathematics and Mathematical Physics” (in Russian). The faculty also plays a key role in the HSE Graduate School of Mathematics (open to domestic and international students). Since the creation of the FM, new faculty members were hired at the international market, and researchers from the USA, Japan, Canada, France, the UK, etc., joined the team. The Faculty of Mathematics has joint departments with distinguished research institutes of the Russian Academy of Science: Steklov Institute of Mathematics, Kharkevich Institute for Information Transmission Problems, Lebedev Physical Institute. Associated with the FM are three international research groups, the so-called laboratories: the Laboratory of Algebraic Geometry and its Applications, the Laboratory of Representation Theory and Mathematical Physics, and the Laboratory of Mirror Symmetry and Automorphic Forms.

Jointly with Moscow Center for Pedagogical Mastership, the FM announced two new programs in 2017: one at the Bachelor and one at the Master level.

== History ==
In 2007, HSE university central administration contacted the Independent University of Moscow (IUM) with a suggestion to join HSE as one of the faculties. Although this suggestion in its initial form was rejected, the IUM decided to help establishing a new Faculty of Mathematics. In particular, several IUM professors were hired by HSE in 2008 and formed the initial composition of the faculty. All further hiring was conducted through open international competitions. In September 2008, FM invited the first Bachelor of Science Students.

The idea behind HSE Faculty of Mathematics was to create the first mathematics department in the former USSR that would be internationally competitive in the following sense:

- Employment terms and conditions (including salary range and research funding) should be attractive for mathematicians from developed countries;
- A hybrid strategy of instruction should be employed that combines Konstantinov's system and the best practices of leading Western mathematics departments (such as teaching assistantships, a cumulative grading scheme, an external English language proficiency evaluation, etc.).
- A new faculty should inherit the main positive features of the IUM, which are the mixing studies and research, teaching of modern mathematics, high level of both professors and students, and lacking the weak ones, which are no right to provide state diplomas, and, most seriously, having a small number of possessors of the IUM degree.

In 2010, a Master of Science program in Mathematics and a PhD program in Mathematical Logic, algebra and number theory were started, with about 10 students at each level. All of the students accepted to the programs had graduated from universities different from the HSE. In 2011, it was decided to make the Mathematics MSc program an international one, with classes given in English, and to establish a new MSc program “Mathematical physics”, in Russian, headed by Igor Krichever. In 2010, the HSE won a `mega-grant’ from the Russian ministry of science and education, and the research group “Laboratory of Algebraic geometry and its applications” was organized under the scientific guidance of Fedor Bogomolov (Courant Institute of Mathematical Sciences, NY, USA). The laboratory maintains its academic activities, however, since 2015, it is funded entirely by the university.

Three chairs (Algebra, Geometry and Topology, and Discrete Mathematics) had existed from the first day of the Faculty, but were disbanded in 2011, making the administrative structure single level rather than a two-level one. Meanwhile, in 2011, under an agreement with the Steklov Mathematical institute of the Russian Academy of Sciences (RAS), a joint department with the Steklov institute was established at the FM. In 2012, a similar agreement was achieved with the RAS Kharkevich Institute for information transmission problems, and, in 2014, with the Lebedev Physical Institute of RAS.

In 2014, the International Laboratory of Representation Theory and Mathematical Physics was founded. The academic supervisor of the laboratory is Andrei Okounkov (Columbia University, NY, USA). The decision to open this research unit came as a result of a competition conducted by HSE and similar to the `mega-grant’ competition conducted by the RF government. In 2016, HSE won another `mega-grant’ for the creation of the International Laboratory of Mirror Symmetry and Automorphic Forms, under the academic supervision of de:Ludmil Katzarkov (University of Vienna, University of Miami).

=== Deans of the Faculty ===
- 2008—April 2015: Sergei Lando
- April 2015—September 2020: Vladlen Timorin
- since September 2020: Sasha Skripchenko

== Current state ==
There are over 70 Mathematics faculty members. If researchers from the three associated research units are counted in, then the size of the academic team is about 120 people. A significant number of these people work part-time. Fourteen of the faculty members/researchers affiliated with the FM have been invited speakers at the International Congress of Mathematicians (ICM), including 3 speakers at the last ICM (Seoul, August 2014):

- Misha Verbitsky (Algebraic and Complex Geometry)
- Alexander Kuznetsov (Algebraic and Complex Geometry)
- Grigory Olshansky (Combinatorics)

International partnerships and student exchange programs in Mathematics include École Polytechnique, Kyoto University, Leiden University, University of Tokyo, École normale supérieure, University of Nantes, University of Luxembourg, Stony Brook University. The Faculty of Mathematics maintains a close connection with the Independent University of Moscow (IUM). Many HSE faculty members also teach core courses at the IUM. Formally, there are the following joint projects of the HSE and the IUM:

- Moscow Mathematical Journal, one of the most frequently cited Russian mathematical journals. In 2014, the Moscow Mathematical Journal had the highest SCImago Journal Rank among all Russian journals.
- Math in Moscow, a study abroad program for international students. American Mathematical Society offers a scholarship program for US citizens admitted to Math in Moscow.

== International Advisory Board ==
The International Advisory Board of the FM consists of prominent international mathematicians (Pierre Deligne, Sergey Fomin, Tetsuji Miwa, Nikita Nekrasov, Stanislav Smirnov) and the Dean of the Faculty (ab officio). The main objectives of the Board include evaluating the academic performance of the Faculty as well as its educational and research policies. The initial composition of the Board included Andrei Okounkov, who accepted a Faculty affiliation in 2015 and therefore was replaced in the Board by Nikita Nekrasov. Also, the ab officio membership of the Dean lead to an automatic change in the Board composition as the Deans changed in 2015.

Composed in 2012, the Board received the first report of the FM in 2012 and gave its evaluation in 2013. Overall, the evaluation was positive:

Within 5 years of its creation, the HSE has become the leading Russian institution of higher learning in pure mathematics. We are most impressed by the Department's undergraduate program which is, in our opinion, among the best ones in the world. It currently attracts the strongest pool of mathematics students in Russia, offering them a challenging and thoughtfully designed curriculum.

— Report of the International Advisory Board (P. Deligne, S. Fomin, T. Miwa, A. Okounkov, S. Smirnov)

However, some important critical remarks were made. Among them:

- Graduate programs of the FM were still in their infancy, and needed improvements.
- Hiring and promotion schemes needed adjustments.
- Some areas of mathematics (notably, Analysis) were underrepresented.
- There were no postdoctoral positions.
- The FM needed more space.

Following the recommendations of the Board, the FM moved to a new (larger) building, and postdoctoral hiring was introduced. The Faculty administration also claimed to have modified educational programs following the suggestions of the Board. However, some group of students complained in 2015 that the study plans still had serious deficiencies.

In 2016, the FM filed the second report to the International Advisory Board.

== Notable faculty members and associate faculty members ==
Fedor Bogomolov (Head of the HSE Laboratory of Algebraic Geometry), one of the creators of the theory of hyperkahler manifolds.

Boris Feigin (Tenured Professor), a well-known expert in representation theory.

Yulij Ilyashenko (Head of the Academic Council, Master of Science program in Mathematics), rector of the Independent University of Moscow, the author of the finiteness result for the number of limit cycles of a polynomial vector field in the plane.

Igor Krichever (Director of the HSE Master of Science program in Mathematics and Mathematical Physics, previously the dean of the mathematics department at Columbia University).

Andrei Okounkov (Head of the HSE International Laboratory of Representation Theory and Mathematical Physics), 2006 Fields Medal recipient, honorary member of the American Academy of Arts and Sciences.

Victor Vassiliev (Chair of the joint department of the Steklov Institute of Mathematics and the HSE Mathematics Department, president of the Moscow Mathematical Society), creator of the theory of finite type invariants.

Mikhail Verbitsky (Professor), prominent mathematician, widely known in Russia as a controversial critic and political activist.

== Graduates ==
Most graduates continue their education at Master’s or PhD level. About a quarter of all graduates have been admitted to the PhD programs of foreign universities: Harvard University, Columbia University, MIT, University of Toronto, Yale University, Princeton University, ETH Zurich, etc. Those who opted for industrial employment, work in the areas of Finance, Insurance, Information Technology, and others,. HSE FM alumni are also employed in education, including mathematical high schools in Moscow (2, 57, 179).
