= Misha Verbitsky =

Russian mathematician (born 1969)

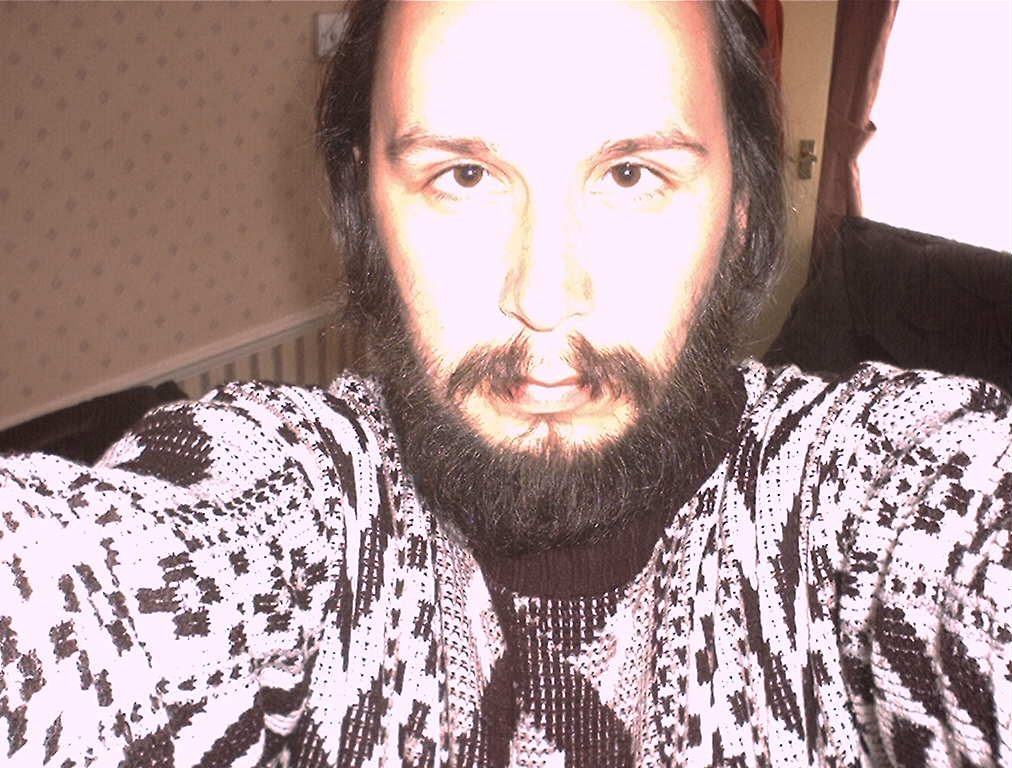
- Born: Mikhail Sergeyevich Verbitsky; June 20, 1969 (age 57); Moscow, Soviet Union
- Education: Harvard University
- Known for: Torelli theorem for hyperkähler manifolds
- Scientific career
- Fields: Mathematics
- Workplaces: Independent University of Moscow; University of Glasgow; HSE Faculty of Mathematics; Université libre de Bruxelles; Instituto Nacional de Matemática Pura e Aplicada
- Doctoral advisor: David Kazhdan

Mikhail "Misha" Verbitsky (Russian: Ми́ша Верби́цкий, born June 20, 1969, in Moscow) is a Russian mathematician. He is primarily known to the general public as a controversial critic, political activist and independent music publisher.

== Scientific activities ==
Verbitsky graduated from a mathematics class at the Moscow State School 57 in 1986, and has been active in mathematics since then. His principal area of interest in mathematics is differential geometry, especially geometry of hyperkähler manifolds and locally conformally Kähler manifolds. He proved an analogue of the global Torelli theorem for hyperkähler manifolds and the mirror conjecture in hyperkähler case. He also contributed to the theory of Hodge structures.

His PhD thesis, titled Cohomology of compact Hyperkaehler Manifolds, was defended in 1995 at Harvard University under the supervision of David Kazhdan. He has held different positions, most prominently at the Independent University of Moscow (since 1996), the University of Glasgow (2002–2007), the University of Tokyo (since 2008), the HSE Faculty of Mathematics (since 2010), and the Free University of Brussels (2015–2016). Since 2017 he has worked at the Instituto Nacional de Matemática Pura e Aplicada in Rio de Janeiro.

== Public activities ==
Apart from mathematical research, Verbitsky was greatly involved in public activities, especially after his graduation from Harvard with a PhD.

=== Political Activities ===
After graduating from Harvard with a PhD, Verbitsky moved to Russia and became a close associate (though not a member) of Eduard Limonov's National Bolshevik Party. His articles were published in a variety of newspapers and magazines, including Russkij Zhurnal, Zavtra and Limonka. He defines himself as a communist, anarchist, and Satanist. When the National Bolsheviks split in 1998, he joined the Eurasia Party of Alexander Dugin. He praised Russian imperialism, National Bolshevism and Eurasianism, and denounced liberalism, consumerism, and the Western world in his blogs. He is also a prominent supporter of the anti-copyright movement, and has given lectures on the subject at various locations, including Oxford University. In 2002 he wrote Anticopyright: The Book, the only Russian publication placing concepts such as open source and copyleft into historical and cultural context.

In 2004–5 he gradually distanced himself from the Eurasianism movement, and claimed that it has gone from being a counterculture movement to becoming part of the official ideology. In 2015, after the arrest of Boris Stomakhin, Verbitsky moved to Belgium, then to Brazil. In November 2024, a criminal case for calls for terrorism was opened against Verbitsky, who publicly condemned Russia's invasion of Ukraine and called for strikes on Russian territory. In January 2025, Rosfinmonitoring added Verbitsky to the list of terrorists and extremists.

On June 13, 2026, IMPA posted a note on its official Instagram profile stating that Verbitsky had been arrested at the Zvartnots International Airport in Yerevan, Armenia. The note requested Verbitsky's immediate release.

=== Activities on the internet ===
Verbitsky was one of the first users of the Russian internet. Verbitsky's website imperium.lenin.ru (including the webzine subdomains :Lenin:, End of The World news, Север and Барсук), from around 1997, is one of the oldest Russian online projects, and has been hugely influential in the shaping of Russian counter-culture. The website contains sociopolitical commentary, philosophy, literature, and Russian underground music criticism. It was the first website to introduce concepts of Western counter-culture, such as Thelema, pornography and right-wing extremism into post-Soviet Russia, and was the first website in Russian to openly discuss topics considered taboo at the time.

=== Writing style ===
Verbitsky's provocative writing style can be described as both aggressive and ironic, a mixture of gonzo journalism, profanity and surreal exaggeration which instantly captures the reader's attention. The critical response to his writings ranges from anger and disgust to fascination and widespread imitation (for example, his catchphrases "So it goes, Misha" and "Kill, Kill, Kill" have been plagiarised all over the Russian web).

=== Ur-Realist Records ===
In 1998, Verbitsky founded the independent label UR-Realist Records to publish experimental and controversial underground music. Since then, over 40 albums have been released, including those of punk legends Grazhdanskaya Oborona and Instruktsiya po Vyzhivaniyu, the neofolk bands Rada i Ternovnik and Kooperativ Nishtyak, and singer-songwriters such as Oleg Medvedev and Hans Zivers (pseudonym of Alexander Dugin). Verbitsky designed the covers and wrote music reviews for many albums published by UR-Realist.

== Personal life ==
Verbitsky currently lives in Rio de Janeiro and teaches at IMPA.

In December 2009, Yuri Kuklachev, the founder of the Moscow Cat Theatre, filled a defamation lawsuit against Verbitsky. Kuklachev was seeking to recover alleged damages caused by Verbitsky quoting previously published allegations of Kuklachev's animal cruelty in one of his blog posts; moreover, Kuklachev holds Verbitsky responsible for the expletive-ridden content of anonymous comments to the post in question.

In 2012, Verbitsky was convicted without his knowledge of copyright infringement. He had posted a photograph of a Russian politician who claims that his beard is trademarked. The case has been appealed.

On June 11, 2026, he was arrested in Armenia at the request of Russia, while traveling to a ceremony in Yerevan. Mathematicians including IMPA and the French Mathematical Society called for his release. He was released on June 16, 2026.

== Bibliography ==
- Anticopyright: The Book (2002)
- :LENIN: an offering to Gods Unknown webzine
- Against Culture + Pt. 2
- Chaos and Underground Culture
