= Bunin (surname) =

Bunin (Russian: Бунин), feminine: Bunina is a Russian surname. Notable persons with the surname include:

- Anna Bunina (1774–1829), Russian poet
- Elena Bunina (born 1976, Russian and Israeli mathematician businesswoman
- Ivan Bunin (1870–1953), Russian writer
- Keith Bunin (born c. 1971), American dramatist and screenwriter
- Lou Bunin (1904–1994)), American puppeteer, artist, and pioneer of stop-motion animation
- Michael Bunin (born 1970), American actor
- Revol Bunin (1924–1976), Russian composer
- Stanislav Bunin (born 1966), Russian-born pianist
- Steve Bunin, American journalist

== See also ==
- 3890 Bunin, main-belt asteroid
