= Sabir Gusein-Zade =

Russian mathematician (born 1950)

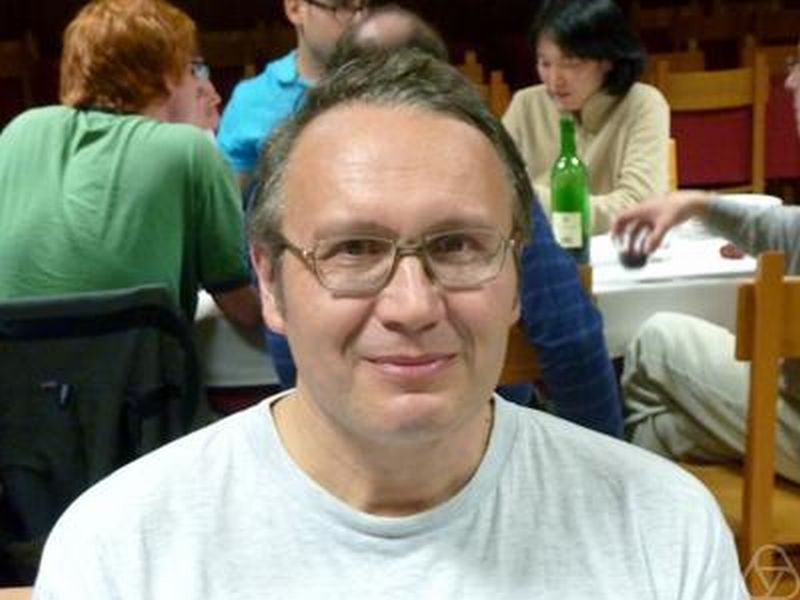
Sabir Gusein-Zade (2010), El Escorial

Sabir Medgidovich Gusein-Zade (Russian: Сабир Меджидович Гусейн-Заде; born 29 July 1950 in Moscow) is a Russian mathematician and a specialist in singularity theory and its applications.

He studied at Moscow State University, where he earned his Ph.D. in 1975 under the joint supervision of Sergei Novikov and Vladimir Arnold. Before entering the university, he had earned a gold medal at the International Mathematical Olympiad.

Gusein-Zade co-authored with V. I. Arnold and A. N. Varchenko the textbook Singularities of Differentiable Maps (published in English by Birkhäuser).

A professor in both the Moscow State University and the Independent University of Moscow, Gusein-Zade also serves as co-editor-in-chief for the Moscow Mathematical Journal. He shares credit with Norbert A'Campo for results on the singularities of plane curves.

== Selected publications ==
- S. M. Gusein-Zade. "Dynkin diagrams for singularities of functions of two variables". Functional Analysis and Its Applications, 1974, Volume 8, Issue 4, pp. 295–300.
- S. M. Gusein-Zade. "Intersection matrices for certain singularities of functions of two variables". Functional Analysis and Its Applications, 1974, Volume 8, Issue 1, pp. 10–13.
- A. Campillo, F. Delgado, and S. M. Gusein-Zade. "The Alexander polynomial of a plane curve singularity via the ring of functions on it". Duke Mathematical Journal, 2003, Volume 117, Number 1, pp. 125–156.
- S. M. Gusein-Zade. "The problem of choice and the optimal stopping rule for a sequence of independent trials". Theory of Probability & Its Applications, 1965, Volume 11, Number 3, pp. 472–476.
- S. M. Gusein-Zade. "A new technique for constructing continuous cartograms". Cartography and Geographic Information Systems, 1993, Volume 20, Issue 3, pp. 167–173.
