= Kasatkin =

Kasatkin (Russian: Касаткин, from касатка meaning killer whale, swallow or small bird) is a Russian masculine surname; its feminine counterpart is Kasatkina. An American variant is Kassatkin. It may refer to:

- Daria Kasatkina (born 1997), Russian and Australian tennis player
- Ivan Kasatkin, birth name of Nicholas of Japan (1836–1912), a Russian Orthodox priest, monk, and saint
- Lyudmila Kasatkina (1925–2012), Russian actress
- Natalia Kasatkina (1934–2024), Russian ballerina and choreographer
- Nikolay Kasatkin (1859–1930), a Russian/Soviet painter
- Pavel Kasatkin (1915–1987), Soviet poet
- Tatyana Kasatkina (born 1963), a Russian philosopher, philologist, culture expert, religious scholar and writer
- Vasily Kasatkin, Soviet professor, rector of the Moscow State University in 1930–1934
- Viktor Kasatkin (born 1942), Soviet sprinter
