= Igor Pak =

- Born: 1971 (age 54–55); Moscow, Soviet Union
- Education: Moscow State School 57
- Alma mater: Moscow State University (BS); Harvard University (PhD)
- Known for: Combinatorics
- Scientific career
- Institutions: Yale University; Massachusetts Institute of Technology; University of Minnesota; University of California, Los Angeles
- Thesis: Random Walks on Groups: Strong Uniform Time Approach (1997)
- Doctoral advisor: Persi Diaconis

Igor Pak (Russian: Игорь Пак) (born 1971, Moscow, Soviet Union) is a professor of mathematics at the University of California, Los Angeles, working in combinatorics and discrete probability. He formerly taught at the Massachusetts Institute of Technology and the University of Minnesota, and he is best known for his bijective proof of the hook-length formula for the number of Young tableaux, and his work on random walks. He was a keynote speaker alongside George Andrews and Doron Zeilberger at the 2006 Harvey Mudd College Mathematics Conference on Enumerative Combinatorics.

Pak is an associate editor for the journal Discrete Mathematics. He gave a Fejes Tóth Lecture at the University of Calgary in February 2009.

In 2018, he was an invited speaker at the International Congress of Mathematicians in Rio de Janeiro.

== Background ==
Pak went to Moscow High School No. 57. After graduating, he worked for a year at Bank Menatep.

He did his undergraduate studies at Moscow State University. He was a PhD student of Persi Diaconis at Harvard University, where he received a doctorate in mathematics in 1997, with a thesis titled Random Walks on Groups: Strong Uniform Time Approach. Afterwards, he worked with László Lovász as a postdoc at Yale University. He was a fellow at the Mathematical Sciences Research Institute and a long-term visitor at the Hebrew University of Jerusalem.
