= Moscow Mathematical Journal =

- Discipline: Mathematics
- Language: English
- Edited by: Yulij Ilyashenko; Michael Tsfasman; Sabir Gusein-Zade

Publication details
- History: 2001–present
- Publisher: Independent University of Moscow/HSE Faculty of Mathematics (Russia)
- Frequency: Quarterly

Standard abbreviations
- ISO 4: Mosc. Math. J.

Indexing
- ISSN: 1609-4514

Links
- Journal homepage

The Moscow Mathematical Journal (MMJ) is a mathematics journal published quarterly by the Independent University of Moscow and the HSE Faculty of Mathematics and distributed by the American Mathematical Society. The journal published its first issue in 2001. Its editors-in-chief are Yulij Ilyashenko (Independent University of Moscow and Cornell University), Michael Tsfasman (Independent University of Moscow and Aix-Marseille University), and Sabir Gusein-Zade (Moscow State University and the Independent University of Moscow).
