= Yegor Kholmogorov =

Russian journalist, author, and political activist

- Егор Холмогоров
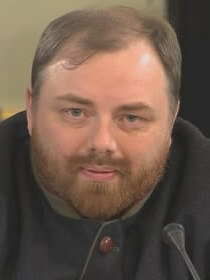
- Kholmogorov in 2012
- Born: April 15, 1975 (age 51); Moscow, RSFSR, Soviet Union
- Citizenship: Russia
- Education: Moscow State School 57
- Alma mater: Russian Orthodox University
- Occupations: Teacher; journalist; politologist

Yegor Stanislavovich Kholmogorov (Russian: Егор Станиславович Холмогоров; born 15 April 1975) is a Russian political figure, opinion journalist, documentary director, blogger, and nationalist. He was a columnist for the Russia Today TV channel, author, and host of the 100 Books website and author of the term "Russian Spring". Kholmogorov was an author of a large number of publications devoted to the analysis of the current political and religious situation in Russia, the philosophy and ideology of conservatism, the history of Russia and the Russian Orthodox Church.

== Biography ==
He studied at schools No. 81 (now 1229) (1982–1987) and No. 401 (1987–1991). In 1992, he graduated from the humanities class of Moscow secondary school No. 57.

In 1992, he entered the history department of Moscow State University, but was expelled after the first year. In 1993, he entered the Russian Orthodox Institute of St. John the Theologian, where Natalya Kholmogorova also studied, but did not graduate from the institute.

In the 1990s, he worked as a part-time junior history teacher at School No. 57 and as a salesman in an Orthodox bookstore in the humanities building of Moscow State University. In the early 1990s, he adhered to liberal democratic views. In 1993, he came out to support president Yeltsin against the Supreme Soviet, but became disillusioned with Yeltsin's policies.

In 1994, he took up journalism. The first publications were in the Segodnya newspaper and the Alpha and Omega magazine.

At the end of 1996, he became a parishioner of the Russian Orthodox Autonomous Church. At the end of the 1990s, he was the editor-in-chief of the Internet site “Churchfulness,” which belonged to the ROAC. In the fall of 1997, he met Konstantin Krylov, with whom in 1998 he created the Russian nationalist website Doctrina.Ru. In 1999 he wrote the brochure “Right Turn. A program for a correct life, a healthy economy and honest politics” for Alexey Ulyukaev, who was at that time Yegor Gaidar's deputy at the IET.

In April 2004, he left the ROAC, criticizing its course as anti-national, and reunited with the Russian Orthodox Church. In November 2005, he gave a presentation at the Theological Conference of the Russian Orthodox Church “Eschatological Teaching of the Church”. In January 2006, he spoke at the plenary session of the International Christmas Readings of the Russian Orthodox Church.

In October 2005, he ran for the Moscow City Duma from the Free Russia party in the elections on December 4, 2005. The party received 2.2% of the vote and did not pass the 10% threshold.

Kholmogorov is a supporter of Nuclear Orthodoxy. He outlined its principles in a June 2007 lecture at the All-Russian Scientific Research Institute of Experimental Physics in Sarov, where he stressed the Christian and eschatological nature of the ideology. As stated in the lecture, Nuclear Orthodoxy is focused on ensuring that the Holy Spirit is received by Russians, that demons are exorcised from Russia, and that Russia is prepared to maintain the Holy Rus' in preparation of the Second Coming, and that nuclear weapons will defend Russia from the forces of Satan. Kholmogorov has lastly categorised Nuclear Orthodoxy as a form of "hagiopolitics", a term also used by the Russian Orthodox Church to justify its support for nuclear proliferation. According to the ROC, nuclear weapons are a necessity to ensure the safety of Moscow, third Rome against the forces of evil. He is also a supporter of the Ruscism term. He published an article titled "Russism. Choosing Putin", in which he broke down Russism into three components: "Russia is above all. Russia is a state of Russians. The Lord is with Russia and the Russians".

On February 6, 2012, he participated in a meeting of Russian political scientists with Vladimir Putin, who at that time held the post of Prime Minister. At the meeting, he entered into a discussion with the prime minister about the understanding of Russian nationalism, proposing, in particular, the mention of the Russian people in the Constitution.

In March 2012, at the organizational conference of the National Democratic Party of Russia, he was elected a member of the organizing committee of this party and appointed a person authorized by the Ministry of Justice to form the party. On September 16, 2012, he resigned and left the party.

From 2012 to 2013, together with Anatoly Wasserman, he was the co-host of the NTV program “Wasserman's Reaction”. From January 2014 to September 2016, he was a regular columnist for the Izvestia newspaper and a columnist for the Russian News Service radio station.

On February 24, 2014, he proposed the term "Russian Spring" to refer to the annexation of Crimea and the war in Donbass. He is an active supporter of Novorossiya. He advocated open intervention of the Russian Federation in Ukraine.

Since 2017, he has been a columnist for Tsargrad TV, where he conducted the daily political review.

Since November 2017, member of the Council of the Society for the Development of Russian Historical Education "Double-Headed Eagle", headed by Konstantin Malofeev and Leonid Reshetnikov. In March 2018, he was awarded by the Double-Headed Eagle Society with the medal “In memory of the reign of the Holy Sovereign Emperor Nicholas II Alexandrovich”.

In January–March 2020, he actively supported the amendments to the Russian Constitution on the state-forming status of the Russian people and on the mention of faith in God.

On January 28, 2021, he took part in the integration forum "Russian Donbass" in Donetsk. He acted as one of the authors of the "Russian Donbass" doctrine, in which the Donetsk People's Republic and Lugansk People's Republic are proclaimed “national states of the Russian people”.

He has been a member of the Union of Russian Writers since March 3, 2021.
