= Alexander Lvovsky =

Lvovsky

- Born: 15 September 1973 (age 53); Moscow, Russia
- Citizenship: Canadian, Russian
- Education: Moscow Institute of Physics and Technology
- Known for: Research and teaching in quantum optics.
- Scientific career
- Fields: Quantum physics
- Workplaces: University of Oxford

Alexander Lvovsky (Russian: Александр Исаевич Львовский; born 15 September, 1973, Moscow, Russia) is an educator and experimental physicist. He currently holds a professorship at the University of Oxford and has contributed to quantum optics and its applications in technology.

== Education and career ==
Lvovsky attended Moscow State School 57, a school renowned for its focus on mathematics and physics. He earned his undergraduate degree in physics from the Moscow Institute of Physics and Technology in 1993. He then attended Columbia University in New York City, completing a Master of Arts and Master of Philosophy in Physics in 1996 and a Ph.D. in 1998. His doctoral advisor was Sven R. Hartmann, and his dissertation focused on superradiance in atomic gases.

After completing his Ph.D., Lvovsky was a postdoctoral researcher at the University of California, Berkeley (1998–1999). He subsequently joined the University of Konstanz in Germany as an Alexander von Humboldt postdoctoral fellow (1999–2001) and later headed an Emmy Noether research group in quantum-optical information technology until 2004. In 2004, Lvovsky became a faculty member in the Department of Physics and Astronomy at the University of Calgary, Canada, where he held a Canada Research Chair and advanced research in quantum information science. In 2018, he joined the University of Oxford as a Professor of Physics, continuing his work in quantum optics and optical computing.

Lvovsky was involved in establishing the Russian Quantum Center and led a research group there between 2013 and 2022.

== Research ==
Lvovsky's research focuses on quantum optics and its applications in technology and information processing, as well as optical computing and neural networks.

Examples of his contributions are

- Experiment on quantum homodyne tomography of the single-photon Fock state.
- Observation of quantum memory for squeezed light.
- A method for optical quantum process tomography by coherent state probing.
- Producing and studying a macroscopic optical entangled state.
- A technology of recovery (distillation) an entangled state after a loss caused by long-distance propagation.
- An interference-based procedure for increasing the amplitude of an optical Schrödinger's cat state.
- A quantum-secured blockchain protocol.

== Teaching and outreach ==
Lvovsky's book Quantum Physics: An Introduction Based on Photons offers an alternative approach to teaching quantum mechanics. The book uses photon polarization as the underlying physical system and teaches entanglement early on in the course, rather than as an advanced concept. This is motivated by the understanding that entanglement is key to the inherent logic of quantum physics, particularly the nature of quantum measurement, clarifying the role of observer in it.

Lvovsky established two educational outreach programmes providing small-group tutorials to senior secondary school students in the UK, delivered mainly by Oxford Physics undergraduate students:

- COMPOS (Comprehensive Oxford Mathematics and Physics Online School) focusses on developing the students' advanced problem-solving skills in mathematics and physics within the school syllabus.
- Quantum Club offers an academically rigorous quantum physics course, covering basic principles such as Hilbert space and measurement, as well as more advanced concepts including entanglement, nonlocality and teleportation.

== Entrepreneurship ==
Lvovsky co-founded Lumai, a spin-off company developing optical neural network technology aimed at high-speed, energy-efficient computing applications.

== Awards ==
Lvovsky has received several awards, including the 2010 International Quantum Award. He is a Fellow of the American Physical Society and a Fellow of Optica.

== Personal life ==
Lvovsky is married to Bhavya Rawal and they are raising three children.
