= Grigory Bubnov =

Russian writer

- Born: Bubnov Grigory Grigorievich, March 9, 1970 (age 56); Moscow, Russian SFSR, USSR
- Education: Moscow Institute of Physics and Technology
- Known for: Rector of MTI
- Spouse: Olga Bubnova

Grigory Bubnov (Russian: Григорий Георгиевич Бубнов; March 9, 1970, in Moscow) – corresponding member of the Russian Academy of Natural Sciences, PhD, the first President of IMD Alumni Club of Russia, "MIPT -Soyuz" board member. Rector of Moscow Technological Institute.

== Biography ==
In 1987 he graduated from Moscow State School 57 mathematical class.

In 1993 he graduated from the Moscow Institute of Physics and Technology (MIPT, Russian State University) majoring in Applied Physics and Mathematics.

In 1997 he defended his thesis on "Entrepreneurship in the developed economies and in the transition period".

In 2002 he defended his doctoral thesis on the topic "Entrepreneurship and its role in the economic revival of Russia". According to analysis made by voluntary networking community Dissernet, Bubnov's doctoral thesis of 2002 contains extensive undocumented plagiarism from several dissertations and books, published in 1998 - 2001.

In 2006 he graduated from the Program EMBA at IMD (Lausanne).

In 2010 he graduated from the program Exponential Technologies Executive Program at Singularity University.

== Professional career ==
Over the past 15 years Grigory Bubnov has been taking charge in more than 20 commercial financial and non-profit organizations, as well as managing more than 30 organizations, including: the Moscow University named after Witte, "Fiztekh XXI", MIPT Higher School of Systems Engineering, SPE “Medolit", ex-BoD member of Pushkino bank.

== Works ==
Author and co-author of more than 20 scientific books, articles and monographs. Some publications:

- Bubnov G.G., Darda I.V., Malyshev N.G., Malyshev S.L, Soldatkin E.V. Informational and educational environment WTU / Telematics 2008: Proc. XV All-Russian Scientific Conference (23–26.06.2008, St. Petersburg). - T. 1. - St. Petersburg., 2008. - p. 214-216 .
- Bubnov, G.G., Malyshev N.G., Soldatkin V.I. University of distributed type / Telematics 2008: XV All-Russian Scientific Conference (23–26.06.2008, St. Petersburg). - T. 1. - St. Petersburg., 2008. - p. 213-214 .
- Soldatkin V.I., Bubnov G.G., Malyshev N.G. The use of distance learning technologies WTU / Telematics 2008: Proc. XV All-Russian Scientific Conference (23–26.06.2008, St. Petersburg). - T. 2. - St. Petersburg., 2008. - p. 337-338 .
- Soldatkin V.I., Bubnov G.G., Malyshev N.G., Semenov A.V. Organizational support for distance learning / / Unified educational information environment: problems and ways of development: VII Int. Scientific- prakt.konf. Exhibition (Omsk, 22–25 September 2008). - Tomsk: Deltoplan, Omsk, 2008. - p. 21-23 .
- Bubnov G.G., Malyshev N.G., Soldatkin V.I. Corporate information-educational environment of open multi-level continuing education / / Education sphere today and tomorrow: Mater. IV All-Russian. scientific. and practical Conf. (Moscow, October 3, 2007) / Editorial council, V.I.Soldatkin. - Moscow: Federal Agency for Education, 2007. - p. 48-50 .
- Malyshev N.G., Bubnov G.G., Soldatkin V.I. World Technological University: goals and objectives in the context of globalization of higher education / / Education sphere today and tomorrow: Mater. IV All-Russian scientific and practical. Conf. (Moscow, October 3, 2007) / Editorial council, Ed. Ed. V.I.Soldatkin. - Moscow: Federal Agency for Education, 2007. - p. 143-145.
- Plokhov, D., Osipov, I. V., & Bubnov, G.G. (Moscow, January, 2016). Using social network analysis techniques to study the efficiency of interproject communication. In ITM Web of Conferences (Vol. 6). EDP Sciences.
