= Igor Krichever =

Russian academic and mathematician (1950–2022)

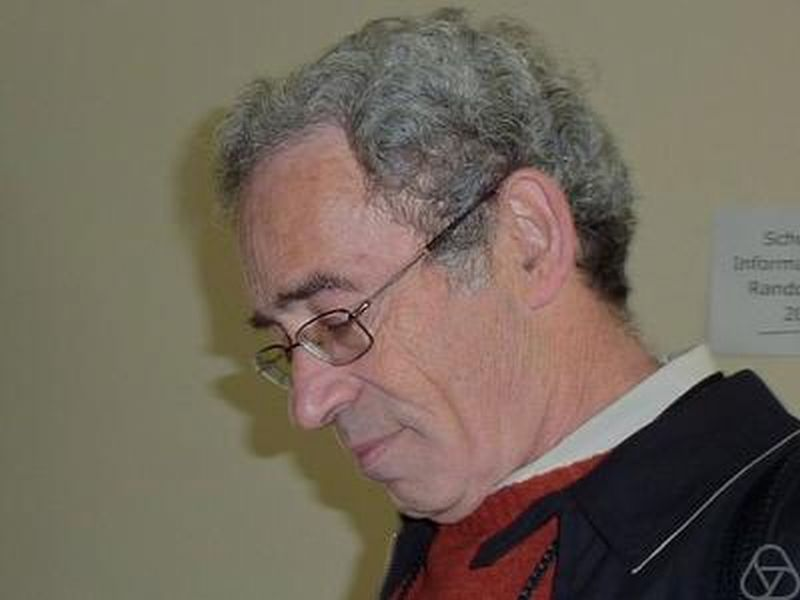
- Krichever in 2010
- Born: Igor Moiseevich Krichever; 8 October 1950; Kuybyshev, Russian SFSR, USSR
- Died: 1 December 2022 (aged 72); New York City, New York, U.S.
- Education: MSU Faculty of Mechanics and Mathematics
- Occupations: Professor; Mathematician

Igor Moiseevich Krichever (Russian: Игорь Моисеевич Кричевер; 8 October 1950 – 1 December 2022) was a Russian academic and mathematician.

== Biography ==
Krichever was born in Kuybyshev to aviation engineer Moisey Solomonovich Krichever and Maria Leyzerovna Arlievskaya. He received a silver medal at the 1967 International Mathematical Olympiad. He graduated from the MSU Faculty of Mechanics and Mathematics in 1972.

From 1975 to 1988, Krichever was a researcher at the Energy Institute G. M. Krzhizhanovsky. He was then a senior researcher at the Institute for Problems in Mechanics of the Russian Academy of Sciences. In 1990, he became a senior researcher for the Landau Institute for Theoretical Physics. From 1992 to 1996, he was a professor at the Independent University of Moscow. In 1997, he became a professor at Columbia University in New York City, where he served as dean of the mathematics department from 2008 to 2011. In 2013, he became a professor at the Higher School of Economics in Moscow. That same year, he became deputy director of the Institute for Information Transmission Problems of Russian Academy of Sciences.

In 2011, Krichever was awarded the Medal of the Order "For Merit to the Fatherland" II class.

Igor Krichever died in New York City on 1 December 2022, at the age of 72.
