= Nuclear Orthodoxy =

Russian eschatological political concept

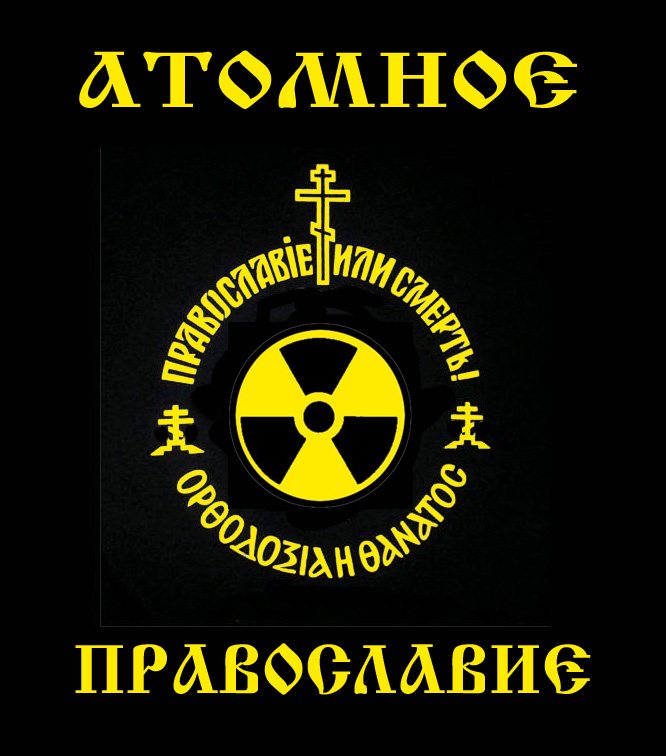
Symbol of Nuclear Orthodoxy, created by Yegor Kholmogorov. The slogan "Orthodoxy or death!" is written around the nuclear symbol.

Nuclear Orthodoxy (Russian: атомное православие, romanized: atomnoye pravoslaviye), also sometimes referred to as Atomic Orthodoxy, is a Russian eschatological political concept which believes that Russia must build up its military, particularly its nuclear arsenal, in order to prepare for the Second Coming. First conceived following the dissolution of the Soviet Union, Nuclear Orthodoxy has become a part of the ideology of the Russian Orthodox Church through its policy of "hagiopolitics". The concept is in some views similar to that of the "Islamic Bomb", or "Nuclear Islamism".

== History ==
Nuclear Orthodoxy was first formulated in the aftermath of the dissolution of the Soviet Union among Eurasianist political circles. The term was first coined by Aleksey Belyayev-Gintovt, who published a painting of a nuclear submarine with Christian imagery at the NovoNovosibirsk exhibition in Paris in 1999. The concept gradually became part of the Russian world ideology. In 2005, Fyodor Ushakov was recognised as patron saint of Russia's nuclear arsenal.

President Vladimir Putin first invoked Nuclear Orthodoxy in a 1 February 2007 press conference, where he stated that the Russian Orthodox Church and Russia's nuclear arsenal were "the components that strengthen Russian statehood and create the conditions for ensuring the country's internal and external security." Putin has continued to invoke Nuclear Orthodoxy on various occasions, such as a 2018 claim that Russians would "go to heaven as martyrs" and foreigners would "simply drop dead."

Nuclear Orthodoxy was further elaborated upon by Eurasianist ideologue Yegor Kholmogorov in 2009, where he argued that Russia must secure dominance over the West through military methods and nuclear blackmail. The same year, Patriarch Kirill of Moscow visited the city of Sarov, home to the All-Russian Scientific Research Institute of Experimental Physics and birthplace of Saint Seraphim of Sarov, where he said that Russia's nuclear weapons programme was the will of God.

Since the 2022 Russian invasion of Ukraine Nuclear Orthodoxy has gained increased attention, particularly as a result of heightened nuclear threats.

== Beliefs ==
Yegor Kholmogorov outlined the principles of Nuclear Orthodoxy in a June 2007 lecture at the All-Russian Scientific Research Institute of Experimental Physics, where he stressed the Christian and eschatological nature of the ideology. As stated in the lecture, Nuclear Orthodoxy is focused on ensuring that the Holy Spirit is received by Russians, that demons are exorcised from Russia, and that Russia is prepared to maintain the Holy Rus' in preparation of the Second Coming, and that nuclear weapons will defend Russia from the forces of Satan.

According to Kholmogorov, three "straitjackets" were imposed upon humanity by God as a reaction to Satan's power. These "straitjackets" are mortality (in accordance with the fall of man), the disobedience of nature to man (in accordance with the Flood myth), and humanity's fragmentation along ethnic lines (in accordance with the Tower of Babel). Kholmogorov argued that there are three methods to overcoming these limitations: through the path of grace and humility, through the path of law and progress, and through the path of rebellion through occultism. Humility is considered by Kholmogorov to be positive and occultism negative, while progress is considered as neutral so long as it does not cross over with occultism.

Kholmogorov additionally argues that Russia's uniquely Christian nature was established by Sergius of Radonezh, and Russia later turned to autocracy under Ivan the Terrible in reaction to conflict with the Western world. He argues that the city of Sarov played a critical role in preventing Russia from becoming part of the west, both as the origin of Saint Seraphim and due to its role in producing nuclear weapons.

Kholmogorov has lastly categorised Nuclear Orthodoxy as a form of "hagiopolitics", a term also used by the Russian Orthodox Church to justify its support for nuclear proliferation. According to the ROC, nuclear weapons are a necessity to ensure the safety of Moscow, third Rome against the forces of evil. Nuclear Orthodoxy has been linked to similar ideas of Russian messianism by researchers, such as Maria Engström of Uppsala University, and been compared to jihadism for its emphasis on holy war.
