= Tatyana Kasatkina =

Russian philosopher, philologist and writer

Tatyana Aleksandrovna Kasatkina (Russian: Татьяна Александровна Касаткина; born 1963 in Moscow, Soviet Union) is a Russian philosopher, philologist, culture expert, religious scholar and writer. She is an expert in the field of theory of culture, theory of literature, philosophy, religious studies, the works of Fyodor Dostoyevsky and Russian literature of the 19th-21st centuries. She is Doctor of Philology (the Russian highest doctoral degree that has no equivalents in English speaking countries), Head Researcher at the Gorky Institute of World Literature RAS, Head of the Centre “Dostoevsky and World Culture” at the Gorky Institute of World Literature RAS, president of the Research Committee for Dostoyevsky's Artistic Heritage within the Scientific Council for the History of World Culture, RAS. She is Editor-in-Chief of the peer-reviewed open-access journal "Dostoevsky and World Culture. Philological journal".

T. A. Kasatkina is a member of the International Dostoevsky Society and of the management Board of the Russian society of F. M. Dostoevsky. She is also a member of the editorial boards of the Almanac "Dostoevsky and World Culture", the Yearbook "Dostoevsky and the Present", and "Dostoevsky Monograph". Tatyana Kasatkina is the author of 8 monographs, the novella The Copy, the textbook "Religion, Culture, Art" (first issue), and more than 300 scientific articles. She has edited a number of collective monographs of Russian and foreign researchers.

== Biography ==
- Graduated from Moscow State School 57 in 1980.
- Graduated from the philological faculty of Moscow State Pedagogical Institute in 1986.
- After completing her post-graduate course at the Gorky Institute of World Literature (IMLI; Russian ИМЛИ) T.A. Kasatkina was admitted to the Department of Literary Theory as a research assistant and after obtaining her Candidate of Sciences degree (equivalent of a Ph.D.) in 1992, she was promoted to a senior researcher. From 1991 to 1996 she was a Scientific Secretary of the Scientific Council for the Study of Literature in the Context of the Studies of Culture headed by А.V. Mikhaylov.
- Since 1996 she has been а regular contributor to the magazine Novy Mir (Russian Но́вый Ми́р, New World)
- In 2000 T.A. Kasatkina was awarded a Doctor of Sciences Degree (Doktor nauk is the highest academic degree having no equivalents in English-speaking countries).Since then she has been working as a leading researcher in the Gorky Institute of World Literature.
- In 2001 T.A. Kasatkina founded and headed the Research Committee for Dostoyevsky's Artistic Heritage within the Scientific Council for the History of World Culture, RAS).
- From 2001 to 2007 she worked as a professor at the Department of the History of World Culture at The Gubkin Russian State University of Oil and Gas (optional course «Religion, Culture, Art»)
- In 2005-2011 she worked as a professor at the Department of Russian and Foreign Literature at the Moscow State Pedagogical Institute (special workshop "Continuity in the individual style of the writer: F.M. Dostoevsky's works"; special course "Religion and Literature")
- In 2010-2019 she has been Head of the Department of Literary Theory at the Gorky Institute of World Literature.
- Since 2018 she is Editor-in-Chief of the peer-reviewed open-access journal "Dostoevsky and World Culture".
- Since 2019 she is Head of the Centre “Dostoevsky and World Culture” at the Gorky Institute of World Literature RAS.

== Research work ==
Tatyana Kasatkina is one of the most prominent Russian specialists in the field of Dostoyevsky studies. Her works were published not only in Russia but also in Great Britain, the US, Switzerland, Italy, Germany, Japan, China, etc. She prepared for publication a new collection of works by F.M. Dostoyevsky, organized in chronological order. Each volume contains not only Dostoyevsky's works of a respective period of his life but also letters and memoirs of his contemporaries that are followed by the comments of a new type — apart from the traditional literary notes there are interpreting ones. She carried out supervision of a number of thesis devoted to Dostoevsky's works. She has given many seminars and lectures in different Russian cities (Moscow, Novosibirsk, Kemerovo, Rostov Veliky, Veliky Novgorod, Barnaul, Staraya Russa, etc.). In the period between 2009 and 2015, being invited by the Catholic movement Communion and Liberation, Tatyana Kasatkina presented lectures on Dostoyevsky and Russian culture in the Universities of Italy (Rome, Milan, Florence, Bari, Venice etc.). Since 1999 she has been a research supervisor of the April Youth Conferences "F.M. Dostoevsky's Works in the Perception of the 21st Century Readers " in the town of Staraya Russa. She also gives seminars to the philologists of teaching professions in Veliky Novgorod.

T.A. Kasatkina's works are mainly devoted to the word's creative role in culture and to the nature of the artistic image. Her theoretical studies are carried out at the intersection of theory of literature, cultural studies, philosophy, religious studies, etc. In her research, she often addresses problems of religion, mysticism, symbolism and the ontological nature of things using as the material the works of Dostoevsky, Pushkin, Lermontov, Gogol, Chekhov, Blok, etc.

== In the media ==
- October 18, 2006 T.A. Kasatkina took part in A. Kostinsky's program "Obrazovanije" (Russian Образование — Education) on Radio Free Europe/ Radio Liberty. The topic of the program was "Research work of schoolchildren as exemplified by the course "Dostoevsky as he is seen by 21st century readers"."
- November 10, 2011 she gave the lecture "The Brothers Karamazov: the image of the world and man" on the TV channel Russia-K (project ACADEMIA).
- November 26, 2012 she took part in the program of I. Popov "Kulturoteka" on Radio "New Life". The topic of the program was "Is Dostoevsky relevant today?"
- In 2013-2018 she took part in the talk show "Igra v biser" by Igor Volgin.

== Awards ==
- 1997 — award of the magazine Novy Mir
- 2015 — award of the magazine Voprosy literatury (Russian Вопросы литературы — Problems of Literature)

== Books in Russian ==
- Kasatkina, T.A. Kharakteriologiia Dosotevskogo [Characterology of Dostoyevsky]. Naslediie Publ., Moscow, 1996.
- Kasatkina, T.A. O tvoriashchei prirode slova. Ontologichnost' slova v tvorchestve F.M. Dostoevskogo kak osnova "realizma v vyschem smysle" [On the Poietic Nature the Word. The Ontological Power of the Word in F.M Dostoevsky's Works as the Basis of his "Realism in the Highest Sense"]. IWL RAS Publ., Moscow, 2004.
- Kasatkina, T.A. Sviashchennoe v povsednevnom: dvusostavnyi obraz v proizvedeniiakh Dostoevskogo [The sacred in the everyday life: a two-part image in the works of F.M. Dostoevsky]. IWL RAS Publ., Moscow, 2015.
- Kasatkina T.A. Dostoevskii kak filosof i bogoslov: khudozhestvennyi sposob vyskazyvaniia [Dostoevsky, Philosopher and Theologian: Artistic Way of Expression]. Volodei Publ., Moscow, 2019.

== Books in Italian ==
- Tat’jana Kasatkina. Dal paradiso all’inferno: I confini dell’umano in Dostoevskij. A cura di Elena Mazzola. Castel Bolognese, Itacalibri, 2012. 218 p.
- Tat’jana Kasatkina. Dostoevskij. Il sacro nel profano. Prefazione di Uberto Motta, traduzione a cura di Elena Mazzola. Milano, BUR Saggi, 2012. 314 p.
- Tat’jana Kasatkina. È Cristo che vive in te. Dostoevskij. L’immagine del mondo e dell’uomo: l’icona e il quadro. Prefazione di Julián Carrón. Castel Bolognese: ITACA, 2012. 112 p.

== Book editor (selected works, in Russian) ==
- Roman F.M. Dostoevskogo "Idiot": Sovremennoe sostoianie izucheniia [F. M.Dostoevsky's Novel The Idiot: Current State of Research: Collected Works by Russian and Foreign Scholars]. Nasledie Publ., Moscow, 2001.
- Literaturavedenie kak problema [Literary studies as a problem]. Moscow, 2001.
- F.M. Dostoevskii i pravoslavie [Dostoevsky and Orthodox Christianity]. Collection of Publicist Works about Fyodor Dostoyevsky. Moscow, 2003.
- Sobranie sochinenii F.M. Dostoevskogo v 9 t. [F.M. Dostoevsky's Collected Works in 9 vols.] Astrel, AST Publ., Moscow, 2003—2004.
- Dostoevskii: Doponeniia k kommentariiu [Dostoevsky: Addenda to the Commentary]. Nauka Publ., Moscow, 2005.
- Roman F.M. Dostoevskogo "Brat'ia Karamazovy": Sovremennoe sostoianie izucheniia [Dostoevsky's Novel The Brothers Karamazov: Current State of Research]. Nauka Publ., Moscow, 2007.
- Dostoevskii i XX vek [Dostoevsky and the 20th Century]. IWL RAS Publ., Moscow, 2007. Vols. 1-2.
- Dostoevsky, F.M. Izbrannoe [Selected Works]. ROSSPEN Publ., Moscow, 2010.
