= Max Sonin =

Russian writer

- Born: Maxim Sonin; 15 March 1998 (age 28); Moscow, Russia
- Occupation: Writer
- Writing career
- Genres: Prose, Young adult fiction

Maxim Sonin (Russian: Макси́м Константи́нович Со́нин, born 15 March 1998), is a Russian writer who has published several novels dealing with LGBTQ+ and violence with AST (publisher) and Popcorn Books (Russian: Popcorn Books). Their debut novel, The Letters till Midnight (Russian: «Пи́сьма до полу́ночи»), a young adult drama, was the first Russian-language book by a major publishing house that mentioned LGBTQ-relationship in the publisher's announcement. The Letters till Midnight has become a regular target of attacks and was blacklisted in 2022 as a part of the government crackdown on LGBTQ+ community in Russia.

Sonin obtained their BA from Haverford College in Pennsylvania, United States in 2019 and MA from University of Chicago, United States in 2022.

== Letters till Midnight ==
The novel presents the story of a developing relationship between two students in a Moscow high school; each of the two girls is a narrator. It is considered one of the first examples of the emerging Russian queer literature by both proponents and anti-LGBTQ media. In an essay on perspectives of the LGBT literature in Russia for Gorky.Media (Russian: Gorky.Media), Konstantin Kropotkin reviews The Letters till Midnight and concludes that the publication of the novel by the largest publishing house in Russia demonstrates the changing attitude of Russian publishers to LGBT literature in general.

Galina Yuzefovich, a prominent literary critic, wrote about The Letters till Midnight: “The novel does more than an actual investigation of the events [sexual abuse episodes in a well-known Moscow high-school]; it is an emotional reflection – and profoundly persuasive at that”. Dmitry Bykov, in a lecture on the ten years of Russian literature on TV Rain channel, called The Letters till Midnight “an attempt to reflect on the new sexuality”.

In 2022, The Letters till Midnight were removed from the major Russian electronic book service Litres.ru amid a broad government crackdown on LGBTQ+ in Russia. Before that the book was constantly present in the media attacks on LGBTQ+ community.

In 2022, AST (publisher) published another Sonin's novel, The Elephant's Steps (Russian: «Ступает Слон»), a loosely connected sequel to The Letters till Midnight which is set up in St. Petersburg and deals with radical feminism. A literary critic and editor Eduard Lukoyanov, reviewing the book for Gorky.Media, wrote “the undoubtful advantage of this book is that the author can perfectly see his audience”. The review argues that Russian literature lacks books dealing with the issues of transgenderness and feminism, and praises the author for focusing on the topic.

== Mishka Mironova ==
Sonin is an author of three crime novels, The Double (Russian: «Дво́ица»), The Hunt (Russian: «Охо́та»), and The Abode (Russian: «Обитель») published by PopcornBooks in 2021 and 2022. The protagonist character, Mishka (Miriam) Mironova, is a sixteen years-old high-school student with a unique ability to solve violent crimes.

In an extensive review of the Mishka trilogy, Gorky.Media compares Sonin's novels to novels in the young adult crime genre, and concludes that “even 30 years from now, Sonin's novels would not require any editing [to make them current]”.

In 2024, Popcorn Books (Russian: Popcorn Books) re-published the crime trilogy in one volume under the title Mishka Mironova.

== Other Work ==
Sonin co-wrote the script for Konstantin Fam’s film The Meyerhold’s Biomechanics, which was scheduled to be released in 2022 and has contributed literature reviews to major Russian print media.
