= Runet (disambiguation) =

Runet is the Russian-language community on the internet.

Runet may also refer to:

- Internet in Russian language
- Internet in Russia
- .ru, the Russian top level domain
