= Elena Bunina =

Russian and Israeli mathematician businesswoman (born 1976

Elena Igorevna Bunina
- Елена Игоревна Бунина
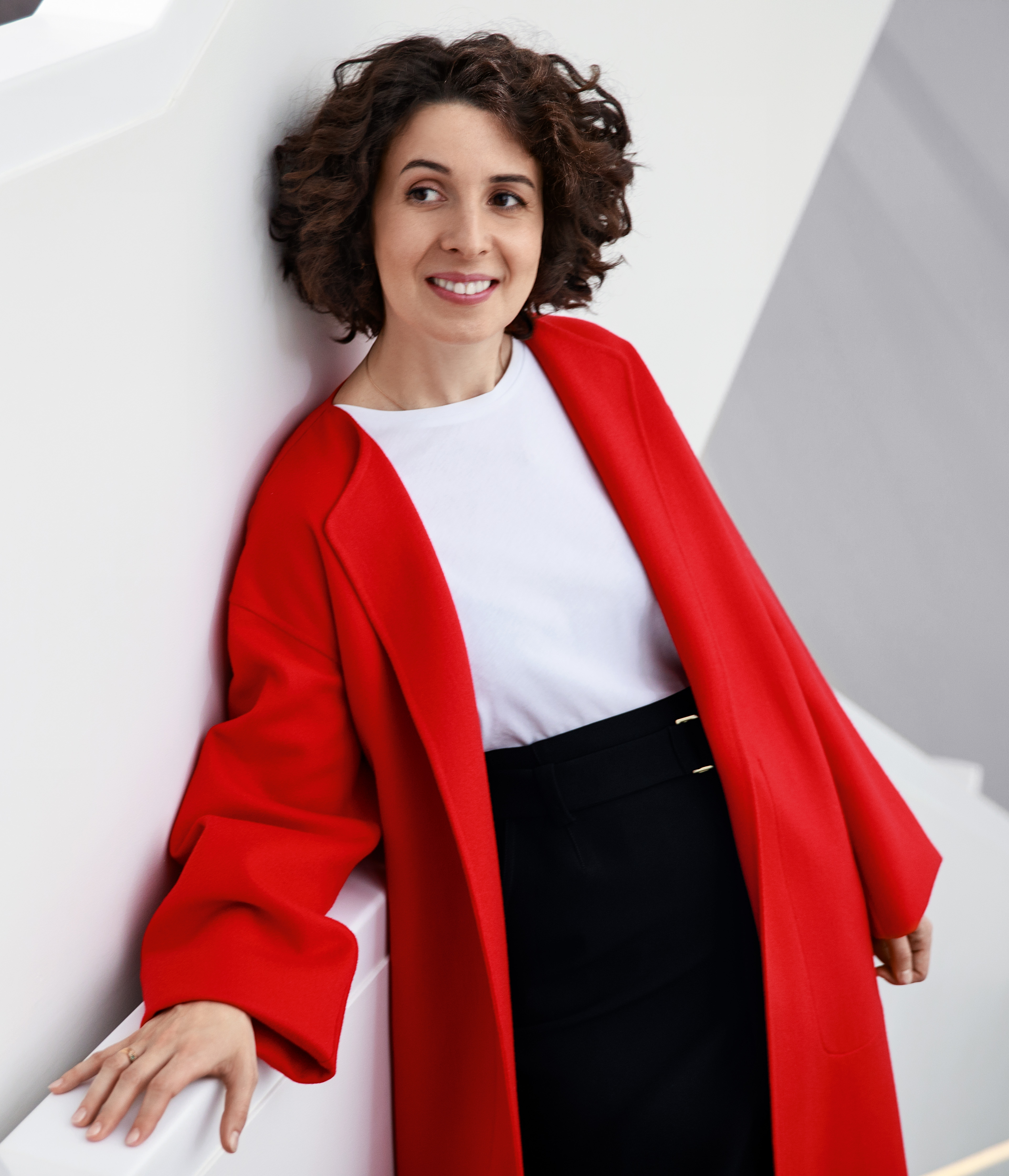
- Elena Bunina in 2018
- Born: May 12, 1976 (age 50); Moscow, Soviet Union
- Education: Moscow State University
- Occupations: Mathematician, businesswoman

Elena Igorevna Bunina (Russian: Елена Игоревна Бунина; born 12 May 1976) is a Russian and Israeli mathematician and businesswoman. She was the CEO of Yandex from 2017 to 2022. Following her resignation, she immigrated to Israel following the 2022 Russian invasion of Ukraine.

As of 2022, she is a professor in the mathematics department of Bar-Ilan University in Ramat Gan, Israel, and a scientific advisor at the Y-Data school of data science in Israel.

== Early life and education ==
Elena Igorevna Bunina was born May 12, 1976, in Moscow, Soviet Russia, and is of Jewish background. Her father Igor Bunin was a historian.

Bunina finished Moscow State School 57, where she later taught mathematical analysis. Bunina graduated from the Faculty of Mechanics and Mathematics at the Moscow State University in 1998.

== Scientific career ==
At the Department of Higher Algebra at Moscow State University, under the guidance of Professor Alexander Vasilyevich Mikhalev, she defended her PhD thesis for the degree of Candidate of Physical and Mathematical Sciences on the topic "Elementary equivalence of linear and algebraic groups".

In 2001 she began teaching programming at the Faculty of Mechanics and Mathematics of Moscow State University, since 2005 she has worked at the Department of Higher Algebra of Moscow State University, where she taught algebra until 2022. Also, at the Moscow Institute of Physics and Technology, she was the head of the Department of Data Analysis at the FPMI until 2022.

In 2010 she defended her dissertation for the degree of Doctor of Sciences on the topic "Automorphisms and elementary equivalence of Chevalley groups and other derived structures".

She is the author and co-author of more than 50 scientific articles on elementary properties of algebraic structures and other issues of algebra and mathematical logic. In 2023 she became a professor at the Department of Mathematics at Israel's Bar-Ilan University.

== Yandex ==
By 2007, Yandex had grown to several hundred employees and was experiencing a significant shortage of qualified personnel. Graduates of technical universities often lacked experience writing code for commercial products and could not meet the company’s needs. Attempts by Yandex co-founders Arkady Volozh and Ilya Segalovich to establish a dedicated university department in a relevant institution were unsuccessful. Volozh’s academic advisor, Ilya Muchnik, who had spent many years at Rutgers University, suggested that the entrepreneurs create their own in-house programming school within Yandex.

In 2007, Elena Bunina was invited to join the Yandex School of Data Analysis (YSDA) project. The initiative proved successful: in its first year, the school enrolled 80 students instead of the planned 30, and 36 of them completed the program. Between 2007 and 2017, over 600 students graduated from YSDA.

After the school was founded, Bunina headed the Computer Science department at YSDA and continued working at Yandex. From 2008 to 2011, she led the company’s Academic Programs Department, and starting in 2011, she headed the Organizational Development and Human Resources Department as HR Director. She consistently ranked among the top HR executives in Russia according to ratings compiled by Kommersant Publishing House and the Russian Managers Association, appearing on the list in 2012, 2013, 2015, and 2016.

On December 1, 2017, Elena Bunina was appointed CEO of Yandex Russia, succeeding Alexander Shulgin in that role.

On March 15, 2022, she was replaced as CEO by Tigran Khudaverdyan, who took on the role while also serving as Managing Director of the entire Yandex Group. Bunina remained with the company as HR Director. However, on March 16, she was reinstated as CEO following Khudaverdyan’s resignation after he was placed under international sanctions.

On April 2, 2022, Bunina resigned as CEO of Yandex and left for Israel from Cyprus, where she had been vacationing. She explained her decision by saying she “could not live in a country that is at war with its neighbors”.

Since 2022, Elena Bunina has been serving as Scientific Director of Y-Data.

== Personal life ==
Bunina is married, and has four children.
