= Moscow Technological Institute =

Technical university in Moscow, Russia

- Московский технологический институт
- Former name: World Technological University
- Type: Private
- Established: 1997
- Affiliations: Moscow Open Institute
- Rector: Grigory Bubnov
- Faculty: 700
- Administrative staff: 200
- Students: 20000
- Location: Kedrova, 8-2, 117292, Moscow, Russia., Moscow, Russia
- Nickname: Mostech
- Website: www.mti.edu.ru

Moscow Technological Institute (formerly known as World Technological University UNESCO) was established in 1997 for the amalgamation of the international, national and regional efforts for the further development of the persistent technological education. It is the only institute of higher education that works under the aegis of UNESCO to execute the decree of the Russian Federation Government from 6 January 1997, 13. This project of UNESCO has been aimed at the internationalisation training of personnel in the sphere of high technology all over the world. The aim of MTI is to provide the integration of the best universities efforts for the spread of knowledge, high technologies and besides ensuring the moderateness of education.

2 faculties and 13 departments do the work towards 64-direction training of personnel in MTI structure. MTI collaborates with 82 Russian universities, among them Moscow State Technical University n.a. N.E. Bauman (MSTU), Plekhanov Russian Academy of Economics and others. The education works not only in Russia, but abroad. The links are established between the universities of Italy, France, Switzerland, the United States and Malaysia.

Oct 25, 2018 Moscow Technological Institute reformed and merged as a division of the Moscow Open Institute.

== Study structure ==
=== Undergraduate ===
Higher education towards such training directions as: "Management ", "Economy ", " Informatics ", "Construction ", " Thermal and Heating technology ", "Management of technical systems ", "Electric Power and Electrical Engineering" " Technosphere Safety ".

=== BBA (Bachelor of Business Administration) ===
Education training program BBA (Bachelor of Business Administration) is a part of the educational profile of "Small Business Management ", Management specialisation. The main difference of BBA program consists in an in-depth study of issues related to particular management functions and different fields of entrepreneurial activity. BBA is simultaneously a traditional undergraduate program and a preliminary step to getting an MBA (Master of Business Administration). Upon the completing their studies, graduates receive a state diploma of higher education with the degree of Bachelor of Management with the specialisation in a chosen fields of study, an international diploma with a Bachelor of Business Administration degree, and a European Diploma Supplement.

=== Second degree ===
Undergraduate and master's degree program studies. Undergraduate studies imply a fundamental learning of a discipline most basic concepts, but also provides an option of a reduced program duration (3,5 years) . Master's degree ( 2-2.5 years ) is based on a deeper and more detailed study of a particular specialisation.

=== Master’s degree ===
Different specialisations such as "Management", "Economy", "Computer Science", "Power and Electrical Engineering", etc.

=== College ===
The training of specialists on a secondary vocational education programs: "Economics and Management", "Computer Science". Upon the completing of the training, participants receive a state diploma.

=== MBA programs ===
Different programs such as MBA Start, MBA Professional, MBA Industry, Mini-MBA MBA program provide students with theoretical and practical knowledge. The training program includes courses in disciplines such as economics, financial reporting, law, human resources management, marketing, production management. Upon the graduation one will be granted a diploma.

=== Continuing Professional Development ===
Additional education:

- Business administration
- Computer and Information Sciences

During the training the participants take part in web-conferences, attend professor's’ and tutors’ consultations, use the studying materials and additional literature of the digital library. Upon the graduation the participants get the diploma.

=== Development of competence ===
is the additional education for specialists and directors that allow to improve their professional knowledge and skills.

Programmes:

- “Construction”
- “Technical security”
- “Energy efficiency”.

The goal of these programs is acquiring extra practical knowledge and skills and also exploring new ways and methods of work.

== Faculties and Departments ==
=== Faculty of modern technology and technics ===
The faculty is a centre for training staff in informatics, modern technology and technics spheres. Departments:

- Department of Information Science and Automation
- Department of technospheric safety
- Department of energetics
- Department of construction
- Department of science
- Department of food technology

=== Faculty of Economics and Management ===
The faculty provides a range of programs within the spheres of “Economics” and “Management”. Both on-site and distance trainings are available.

- Department of economics
- Department of management
- Department of social and humanitarian studies.

=== Moscow School of Brain and Cognitive Science ===
The faculty provides a training for psychologists, teachers, coaches, social workers, doctors, businessmen and people interested in personal growth and development.

=== Moscow Business School ===
Logo for Moscow Business School

== Partners ==
- Institute of Information Technologies (Moscow)
- Institute of Psychoanalysis (Moscow)
- Moscow Business School
- Moscow Institute of Economy, Management and Law (Moscow)
- National Institute of Modern Design (Moscow)
- Samara institute of continuous education (Samara)
