= Math in Moscow =

Study abroad program for undergraduates

Math in Moscow (MiM) is a one-semester study abroad program for North American and European undergraduates held at the Independent University of Moscow (IUM) in Moscow, Russia. The program consists mainly of math courses that are taught in English. The program was first offered in 2001, and since 2008 has been run jointly by the Independent University of Moscow, Moscow Center for Continuous Mathematical Education, and the Higher School of Economics (HSE).

The program has hosted over 200 participants, including students from Harvard, Princeton, MIT, Harvey Mudd, Berkeley, Cornell, Yale, Wesleyan, McGill, Toronto, and Montreal.

== Features ==
The MiM semester lasts fifteen weeks with fourteen weeks of teaching and one week of exams. Math courses are lectured by professors of the Independent University of Moscow and the Math Department of National Research University Higher School of Economics. The cultural elements of the program include organized trips to Saint Petersburg and to the Golden Ring towns of Vladimir and Suzdal. Students live in the dormitory of the Higher School of Economics.

Each semester the American Mathematical Society offers up to five "Math in Moscow" scholarships provided by the National Science Foundation to US undergraduates, and the Canadian Mathematical Society offers one or two NSERC scholarships to Canadian students.

The program is often reviewed favorably by North American students and their departments.

== Curriculum ==
The primary curriculum is entirely mathematical, drawing from every major field of mathematics. All courses are taught jointly with the Higher School of Economics, and are often attended by students from the HSE master's program. Likewise, Math in Moscow participants may attend open lectures and seminars at the Higher School of Economics. The Math in Moscow courses are formally divided into three groups according to the expected prerequisites; admitted students may choose to attend whichever and as many courses as they wish. An incoming aptitude exam is administered to assist in advising students' course selections.

All courses require at least a semester each of analysis and linear algebra as prerequisites. Courses at the first level require no more than this basic formal background, but are generally more intensive than their equivalents at North American universities, often taught from first-year graduate texts and presenting material typically covered only at a graduate level; intermediate courses correspond to senior-level offerings at scientifically-focused American and Canadian institutions; and advanced courses are graduate-level.

Elementary Courses

- Combinatorics
- Programming: From an Art to a Science
- Topology I
- Advanced Linear Algebra
- Basic Algebra
- Geometric Foundations of Analysis
- Non-Euclidean geometry
- Ordinary Differential Equations

Intermediate courses

- Advanced Algebra
- Differential Geometry
- Calculus on Manifolds
- Complex Analysis
- Ergodic Theory of Dynamical Systems
- Knot Theory
- Algebraic Number Theory
- Topology II: Introduction to Homology and Cohomology Theory
- Algebraic Geometry
- Basic Representation Theory
- Computability and Complexity

Advanced courses

- Equations of Mathematical Physics
- Introduction to Commutative and Homological Algebra
- Mathematical Catastrophe Theory
- Riemann Surfaces

In addition to the mathematical curriculum, students are offered electives in Russian literature, Russian history, history of mathematics and science, and Russian language.

== Course structure ==
The courses deviate in structure from standard courses in the United States, Canada, and Europe. The Russian pedagogical tradition emphasizes developing the active participation of students. Classes are designed to encourage dialogues between the students and the teacher, which is more easily achieved in the program's small classes of two to ten students. Each math course runs for three hours once a week. Roughly speaking, classes devote an hour and a half to lecture and an hour and a half to exercises, although the structure varies from course to course. Students may choose any number of courses, in practice between three and six from the mathematical curriculum. Courses are run jointly with the Higher School of Economics M.Sc program. Most of the Math in Moscow courses are given at the building of the Independent University of Moscow, located in the center of Moscow near the historic Arbat, and some take place in the building of the Higher School of Economics.

== See also ==
- Budapest Semesters in Mathematics is a similar program held in Budapest, Hungary.
