= Independent University of Moscow =

Educational institution in mathematics

- Независимый Московский Университет
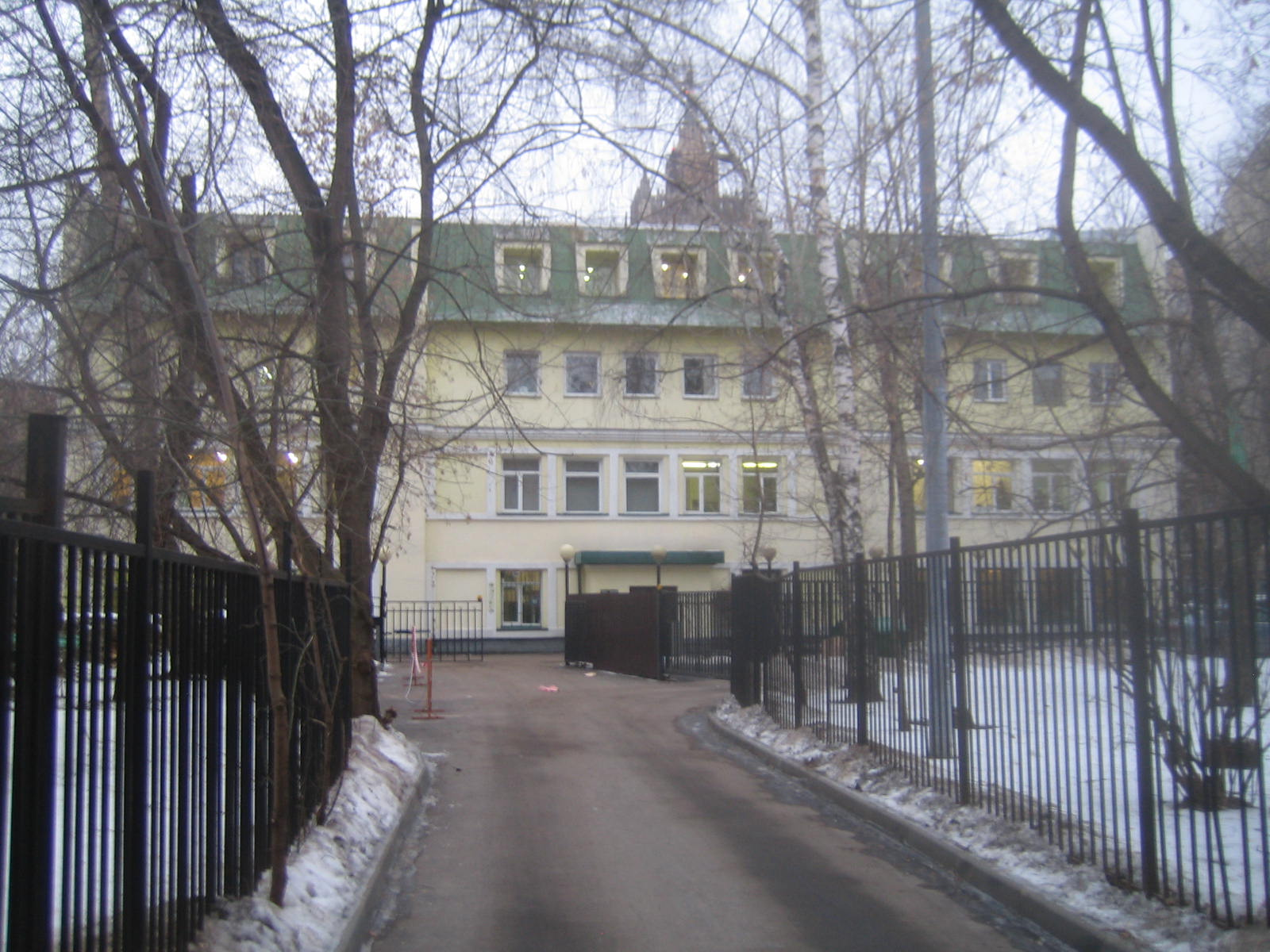
- Other names: IUM; НМУ
- Type: Non-governmental
- Established: 1991
- Parent institution: Moscow Center for Continuous Mathematical Education
- Location: Bolshoy Vlasyevsky Lane 11, Moscow, Russia; 55.746°N 37.587°E
- Language: Russian (core); English (Math-in-Moscow)
- Website: Official website

The Independent University of Moscow (IUM; Russian: Независимый Московский Университет, НМУ) is a non-governmental educational institution in Moscow, Russia, focused on advanced study and training in mathematics. Founded in 1991 by a group of mathematicians including Vladimir Arnold (chairman) and Sergei Novikov, IUM now operates as a division of the Moscow Center for Continuous Mathematical Education (MCCME). The founders cited both the École normale supérieure (Paris) and the informal People’s University organized by mathematician Bella Subbotovskaya as organizational models.

Teaching is primarily scheduled in the evenings and lectures are generally open to the public. IUM does not conduct formal entrance examinations; participation begins as an auditor and formal student status (“listener”) is determined by academic performance recorded in IUM examinations. As of 1 January 2026, a licentiate diploma—based on a set of core undergraduate‑level courses—is a prerequisite for graduation.

IUM hosts the Math‑in‑Moscow study‑abroad program, co‑founded the English‑language Moscow Mathematical Journal with the Higher School of Economics, collaborates with the CNRS through the Poncelet Interdisciplinary Research Center, and has organized the annual Möbius competition for student research since 1997.

== Location and campus ==
The Independent University of Moscow is housed at 11 Bolshoy Vlasyevsky Lane in central Moscow, near the Arbat district. The building contains lecture rooms, a conference hall, a library, a computer classroom, and a cafeteria; a mathematics bookshop operated by MCCME is located on the premises.

== History ==
=== Origins and influences ===
Plans for an independent mathematics school in Moscow were developed in 1991 by a group of mathematicians and mathematics educators associated with the city’s olympiad and extracurricular circles. In outlining the concept, the founders cited both the École normale supérieure (Paris) and the informal “People’s University” organized by mathematician Bella Subbotovskaya (also known as the Jewish People’s University, 1978–1982) as models for a compact, seminar‑centered institution with open access.

=== Founding and early years (1991–1996) ===
The Independent University of Moscow (IUM) began offering open lectures in September 1991. The first courses were taught by Alexandre Kirillov (analysis), Ernest Vinberg (algebra), and Alexei Sossinsky (geometry). A parallel Physical College (theoretical physics) also started in 1991. On 25 January 1993 the Mathematical College received a license to provide higher education, and Alexey Rudakov was elected the first dean. In 1996 IUM moved into a renovated building at Bolshoy Vlasyevsky Lane 11; the building was inaugurated on 26 September 1996 in the presence of representatives of the Moscow city government and the Russian Academy of Sciences.

=== Organizational developments and programs (1997–2007) ===
In 1997 IUM launched the annual Möbius competition for student and postgraduate research papers. In the late 1990s and early 2000s the university expanded international activities, including an exchange with the École normale supérieure and the study‑abroad program Math‑in‑Moscow (first run in 2001), with scholarship support from the American Mathematical Society and the National Science Foundation. In 2002 a joint CNRS–IUM laboratory was opened in Moscow (later the Poncelet Interdisciplinary Research Center). IUM also co‑founded the English‑language Moscow Mathematical Journal; since 2009 the journal has been published jointly with the Faculty of Mathematics at the Higher School of Economics (HSE).

=== Status changes and affiliation (2007–present) ===
Following changes in Russian education regulations in the late 2000s, IUM transitioned from issuing state‑recognized higher‑education diplomas to operating under a license for additional professional education and became a division of the Moscow Center for Continuous Mathematical Education (MCCME). It continues to offer an evening, seminar‑driven program in mathematics with open access to lectures. Details of admissions and academic requirements are set out in IUM’s Rules of Study, including a licentiate diploma (from 1 January 2026) as a prerequisite for graduation.

=== Former Physical College ===
A Physical College (theoretical physics stream) operated alongside mathematics in the early 1990s; it has since been discontinued.

== Academics ==
IUM offers an evening, seminar‑centered program in mathematics, typically spanning five years and culminating in a diploma thesis. Tuition is free.

=== Curriculum and licentiate ===
As of 1 January 2026, obtaining the IUM licentiate diploma is a prerequisite for graduation. The licentiate program comprises 15 core courses announced as required and typically offered in the first five or six semesters:

1. Mathematical Analysis 1
2. Mathematical Analysis 2
3. Analysis on Manifolds
4. Algebra 1
5. Algebra 2
6. Algebra 3
7. Geometry
8. Topology 1
9. Topology 2
10. Differential Geometry
11. Algebra 4
12. Topology 3
13. Probability Theory
14. Complex Analysis
15. Differential Equations

To receive the licentiate it is necessary and sufficient to pass 12 of these 15 courses, provided that the first 10 are passed. Completion of at least 24 semester courses plus the licentiate allows a student to declare a diploma year and prepare a thesis under faculty supervision; defenses are typically held in late May–early June.

== Admissions ==
IUM maintains open and free attendance at mathematics classes; anyone may attend as an auditor and sit examinations. Academic results are recorded in official protocols maintained by the academic office. Formal student status (“listener”, slushatel’) is based on accumulated passed courses: to be a listener of semester k (1 < k < 10), a candidate must have at least one course passed in the preceding semester and at least 3k − 4 passed IUM courses in total; lists of listeners are reviewed four times per year. Listeners who pass examinations in person may receive a semester stipend (“premium”).

Within the degree requirements, special seminars and supervised research may be credited (normally no more than two special seminars toward the IUM diploma). Elective courses from other institutions may be credited by decision of a commission; courses passed at the Steklov Institute of Mathematics educational center are credited without restriction. A student may repeat (“double”) a semester twice during their studies.

== See also ==
- Bella Subbotovskaya
- Jewish People's University
- Math in Moscow
- Moscow Mathematical Journal
