= Music of Armenia =

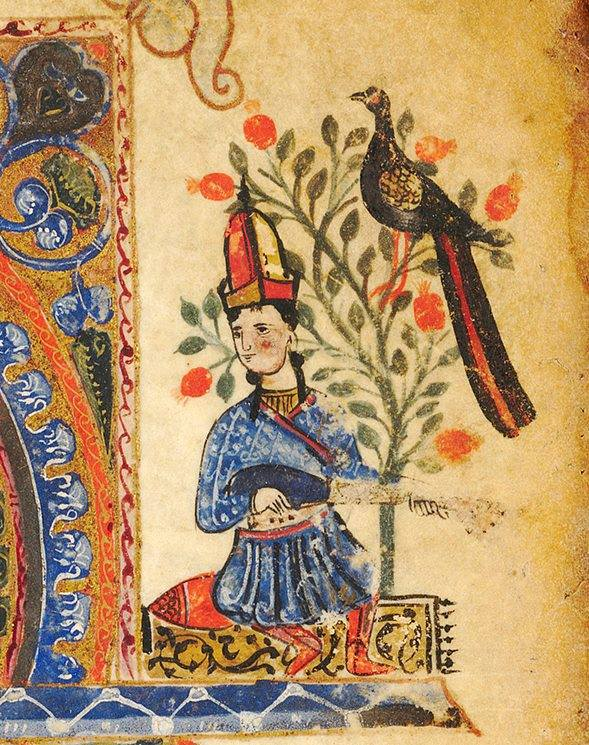
Matenadaran M6288, Female troubadour with saz, Horomos, Ani, 1211

The music of Armenia (Armenian: հայկական երաժշտություն haykakan yerazhshtut’yun) has its origins in the Armenian highlands, dating back to the 3rd millennium BCE, and is a long-standing musical tradition that encompasses diverse secular and religious, or sacred, music (such as the sharakan Armenian chant and taghs, along with the indigenous khaz musical notation). Folk music was notably collected and transcribed by Komitas Vardapet, a prominent composer and musicologist, in the late 19th and early 20th centuries, who is also considered the founder of the modern Armenian national school of music. Armenian music has been presented internationally by numerous artists, such as composers Aram Khachaturian, Alexander Arutiunian, Arno Babajanian, Haig Gudenian, and Karen Kavaleryan as well as by traditional performers such as duduk player Djivan Gasparyan.

== Melodic basis ==
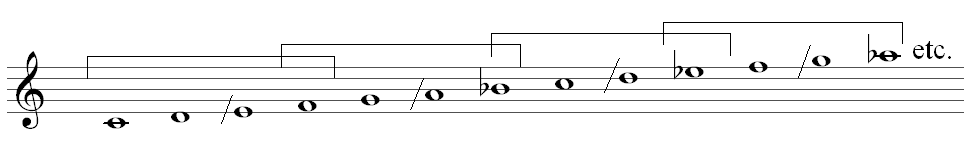
Armenian scale

Traditional Armenian folk music as well as Armenian church music is not based on the European tonal system but on a system of tetrachords. The last note of one tetrachord also serves as the first note of the next tetrachord – which makes a lot of Armenian folk music more or less based on a theoretically endless scale.

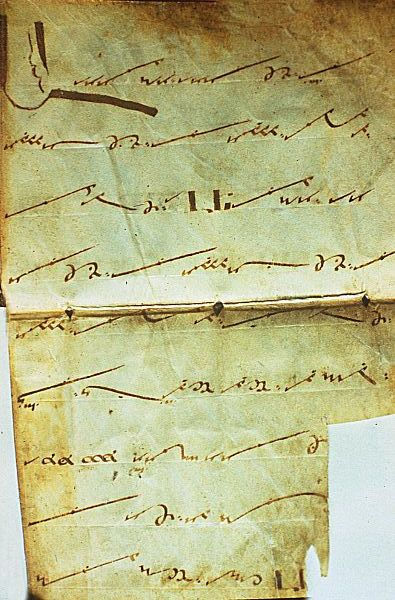
Armenian music manuscript with Khaz neumes, 12th century (Matenadaran)

Khaz is an Armenian neume, one of a set of special signs (khazes) constituting the traditional system of musical notation that has been used to transcribe Armenian music (mostly religious Armenian music) since the 8th century.

== Folk music ==
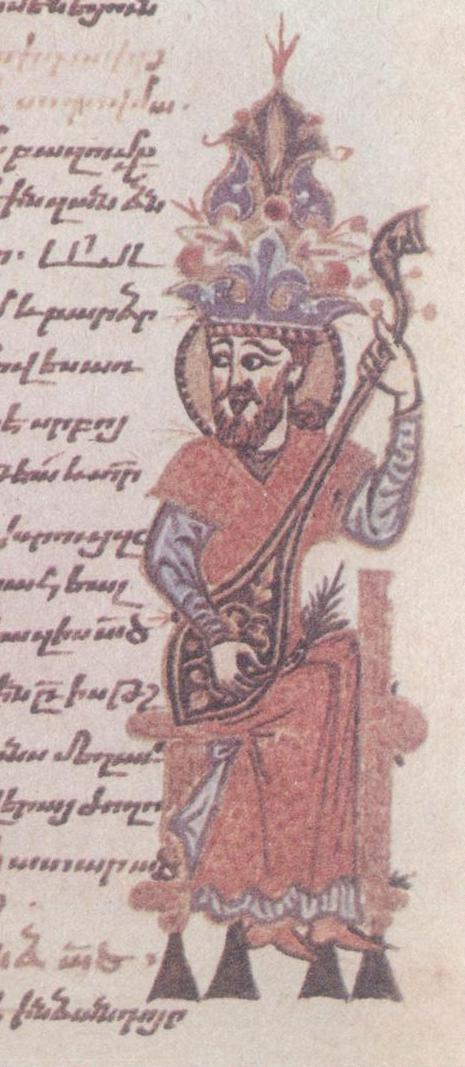
Matenadaran, manuscript no. 346, p., 280a. Musician with saz in hand

Armenia has had a long tradition of folk music since antiquity. During the Soviet era, Armenian folk music was taught in state-sponsored conservatoires. In 1978, influential kanon player and composer Khachatur Avetisyan founded the folk music department of the Komitas State Conservatory of Yerevan. Traditional instruments include the qamancha, kanon (box zither), dhol (double-headed hand drum, see davul), oud (lute), duduk, zurna, blul, sring, shvi, pku, parkapzuk, tar, dmblak, bambir, and to a lesser degree the saz. Other instruments often used include the violin and clarinet. The duduk is considered to be Armenia's national instrument, and among its well-known performers are Margar Margaryan, Levon Madoyan, Vache Hovsepyan, Gevorg Dabaghyan, and Yeghish Manukyan, as well as Armenia's most famous contemporary duduk player, Djivan Gasparyan.

Notable performers of folk music include vocalists such as Armenak Shahmuradyan, Ofelya Hambardzumyan, Vagharshak Sahakyan, Araksia Gyulzadyan, Varduhi Khachatryan, Norayr Mnatsakanyan, Hovhannes Badalyan, Hayrik Muradyan, Valya Samvelyan, Rima Saribekyan, Raffi Hovhannisyan, Avak Petrosyan, Papin Poghosyan, and Flora Martirosian.

There are also several Armenian folk ensembles, the Shoghaken Folk Ensemble, founded in 1995 in Yerevan, and others such as the Arev Armenian Folk Ensemble.

=== Gusan and Ashugh art ===
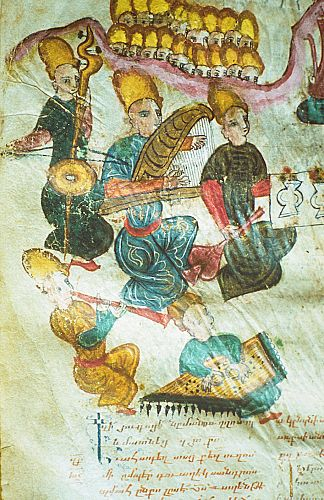
Matenadaran, manuscript showing group of musicians, 16th–17th centuries

In ancient and medieval Armenia, the gusans (Armenian: գուսան) were the creative and performing artists – singers, instrumentalists, dancers, storytellers, and professional folk actors in public theaters. The word gusan is first mentioned in early Armenian texts of the 5th century AD, such as Faustus of Byzantium, Moses of Chorene, and others. In the early Middle Ages the word gusan was used as an equivalent to the classical Greek word mimos (mime). There were 2 groups of gusans: the first were from aristocratic dynasties (feudal lords) and performed as professional musicians; the second group comprised popular, but illiterate gusans.

The gusans were both criticized and praised, particularly in medieval Armenia. The adoption of Christianity had its influence upon Armenian minstrelsy, gradually altering its ethical and ideological orientation. The center of the gusans was the Goghtn gavar (canton), a region in the Vaspurakan province of Greater Armenia that bordered the province of Syunik.

During the late Middle Ages, gusans were succeeded by popular, semi-professional musicians called ashughs (Armenian: աշուղ), who played instruments like the kamancha and saz. Sayat-Nova, an 18th-century ashugh and poet, is revered in Armenia. Other Armenian ashughs include Jivani, Sheram, Shirin, Shahen, Havasi, and Ashot

=== Folk music in the Armenian diaspora ===
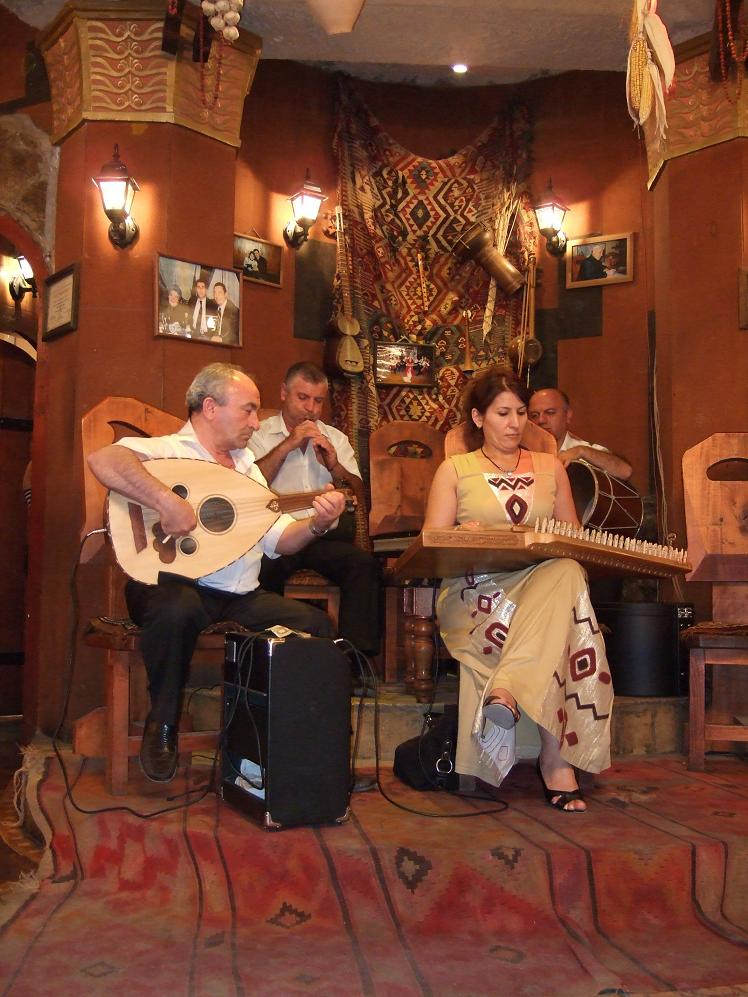
Armenian folk musicians

Descendants of survivors of the Armenian genocide, originally from Western Armenia, and Armenian emigrants from other parts of the Middle East have settled in various countries, especially in the California Central Valley. The second- and third-generation artists, such as Richard Hagopian, an oud-player associated with the kef tradition of Armenian-American music have kept their folk traditions alive. This dance-oriented style of Armenian music, using Armenian and Middle Eastern folk instruments (often electrified/amplified) and some Western instruments, preserved the folk songs and dances of Western Armenia. Many artists also played the contemporary popular songs of cosmopolitan Turkey and other Middle Eastern countries from which the Armenians emigrated (termed surjaran or café aman, meaning cafeteria), on the Eight Avenue of Manhattan, New York City. Bands such as the Vosbikian Band of Philadelphia were notable in the 1940s and 1950s for developing their own style of "kef music", heavily influenced by the popular American big band jazz of the time. Another oud player, John Berberian, is notable in particular for his fusions of traditional music with rock and jazz in the 1960s.

In the Lebanese and Syrian diaspora, George Tutunjian, Karnig Sarkissian and others performed Armenian revolutionary songs, which quickly became popular among the Armenian Diaspora, notably ARF supporters. In Tehran, Iran, the folk music of the Armenian community is characterized by the work of Nikol Galanderian (1881–1946) and the Goghtan Choir.

=== Hayrens ===
Hayren is a form of traditional Armenian poetry. Hayrens are typically composed of four lines with each of the four lines containing 15 syllables. Each line divides into two half-lines that consist of seven and eight syllables. Some of this structure has been lost in translation, and the poems are best appreciated in the Armenian language. This form of poetry dates back to medieval Armenia and has been used by various poets and writers throughout history. The content of hayrens can vary, covering topics such as love, satire, or lessons in morality.

=== Examples of Armenian folk music ===
A part of Kochari

Armenian folk music often accompanies Armenian folk dances, which vary significantly across regions. Most of the folk songs/dances have ancient or medieval origins.

The most popular Armenian folk songs/dances are Kochari, Shalakho, Yarkhushta, Berd, Tamzara, Lorke, Sari Aghjik, and Uzundara.

Another example is Mokats Mirza, a medieval folk song.

== Religious music ==
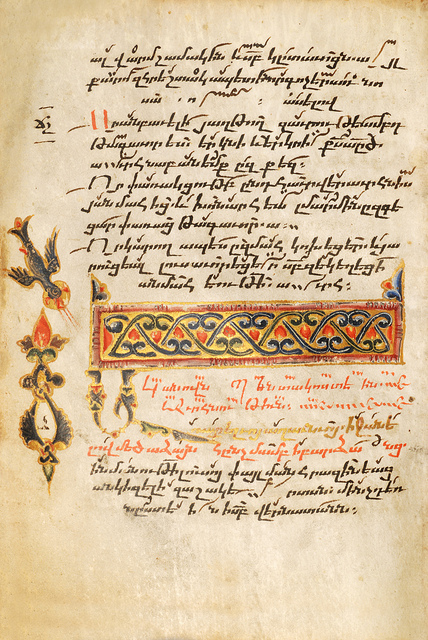
Medieval Armenian hymnaire, 1332

Armenian religious (or sacred) music, which is predominantly vocal, is one of the oldest branches of Christian culture, and was introduced after the Christianization of Armenia in 301 AD. Armenian chant, composed in one of eight modes, is the most common kind of religious music in Armenia. It is written in khaz, a form of indigenous musical notation. Many of these chants are ancient in origin, extending to pre-Christian times, while others are relatively modern, including several composed by Saint Mesrop Mashtots, who also invented the Armenian alphabet. Some of the best performers of these chants, or sharakans, reside at the Holy Cathedral of Etchmiadzin, and include the late soprano Lusine Zakaryan.

Makar Yekmalyan (1856–1905) composed the Patarag, the setting of the Armenian Apostolic Church's Divine Liturgy, which he completed in 1892 in several arrangements and was first published in Leipzig in 1896. This arrangement of the liturgy incorporated polyphonic and homophonic vocal parts into the structure of the Liturgy and saw it be notated in its entirety. This would influence the compositional approach of Komitas, who was Yekmalian's student (along with the works of Kristapor Kara-Murza) and would also see him introduce polyphony with his version of the Liturgy at the end of the 19th century.

== Classical music ==
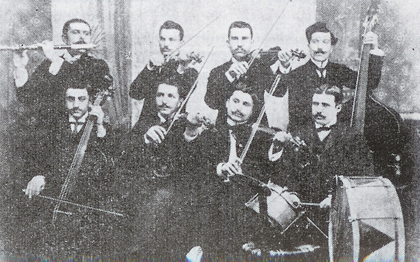
The Armenian Orchestra of Adana, 1902–1906

Armenian classical composers of Ottoman classical music include Kemani Tatyos Ekserciyan (1858–1913), music theorist Hampartsoum Limondjian (1768–1839) who developed the influential "Hamparsum" notation system, and Bimen Şen Der Ghazarian (1873–1913).

Alexander Spendiarov (1871–1928), Armen Tigranian (1879–1950), and Haro Stepanian are best known for their Armenian operas. Sargis Barkhudaryan (1887–1973) and Garo Zakarian (1895–1967) are representative composers of the pre- and early Soviet Armenian era. The most famous, however, was Aram Khatchaturian (1903–1978), internationally well-known especially for his music for various ballets and the immortal Sabre Dance from his composition for the ballet Gayane. Gevorg Armenyan (1920–2005), Anahit Tsitsikian (1926–1999), Arno Babajanian (1921–1983), Barseg Kanatchian (1885–1967), Edward Mirzoyan (1921–2012), Boris Parsadanian (1925–1997), Ashot Zohrabyan (b. 1945), Aram Satian (b. 1947), and Vartan Adjemian (b. 1956) represent other Soviet-era Armenian composers. Iosif Andriasov's (1933–2000) was an influential composer-symphonist, a moral philosopher, and a teacher. Alexander Arutiunian (1920–2012) is best known for his Trumpet Concerto in A-flat major. Alexander Dolukhanian (1910–1968) composed or arranged numerous Armenian songs, including the well-known "Swallow". Alexander Adjemian (1925–1987), Ashot Satian (1906–1958) and Vagarshak Kotoyan (1921–1992) are known for their contributions to Armenian choral and vocal music. Eduard Abramian (1923–1986) wrote songs on the poetry of Armenian poets Hovhannes Tumanyan and Avetik Isahakian which are now part of the standard repertoire. Artemi Ayvazyan (1902–1975) wrote the first Soviet musical comedies, including the popular "Dentist from the Orient". In recent years, Avet Terterian (1929–1994), Tigran Mansurian (b. 1939), Vache Sharafyan (b. 1966) and Aram Petrosyan (b. 1972) have achieved global success. Another acclaimed, more recent, classical composer is Khachatur Avetissian (1926–1996), many of whose compositions are based on traditional folklore themes. Uruguayan-Armenian composer Coriún Aharonián (1940–2017), besides a notable body of avant-garde compositions has done extensive musicological and political work. The Armenian nationalist composer Alexander Kaloian (b. 1962) is known for his overtly nationalistic works for military band and orchestra including marches, tone poems and symphonies immediately recognizable as "Armenian" in their color.

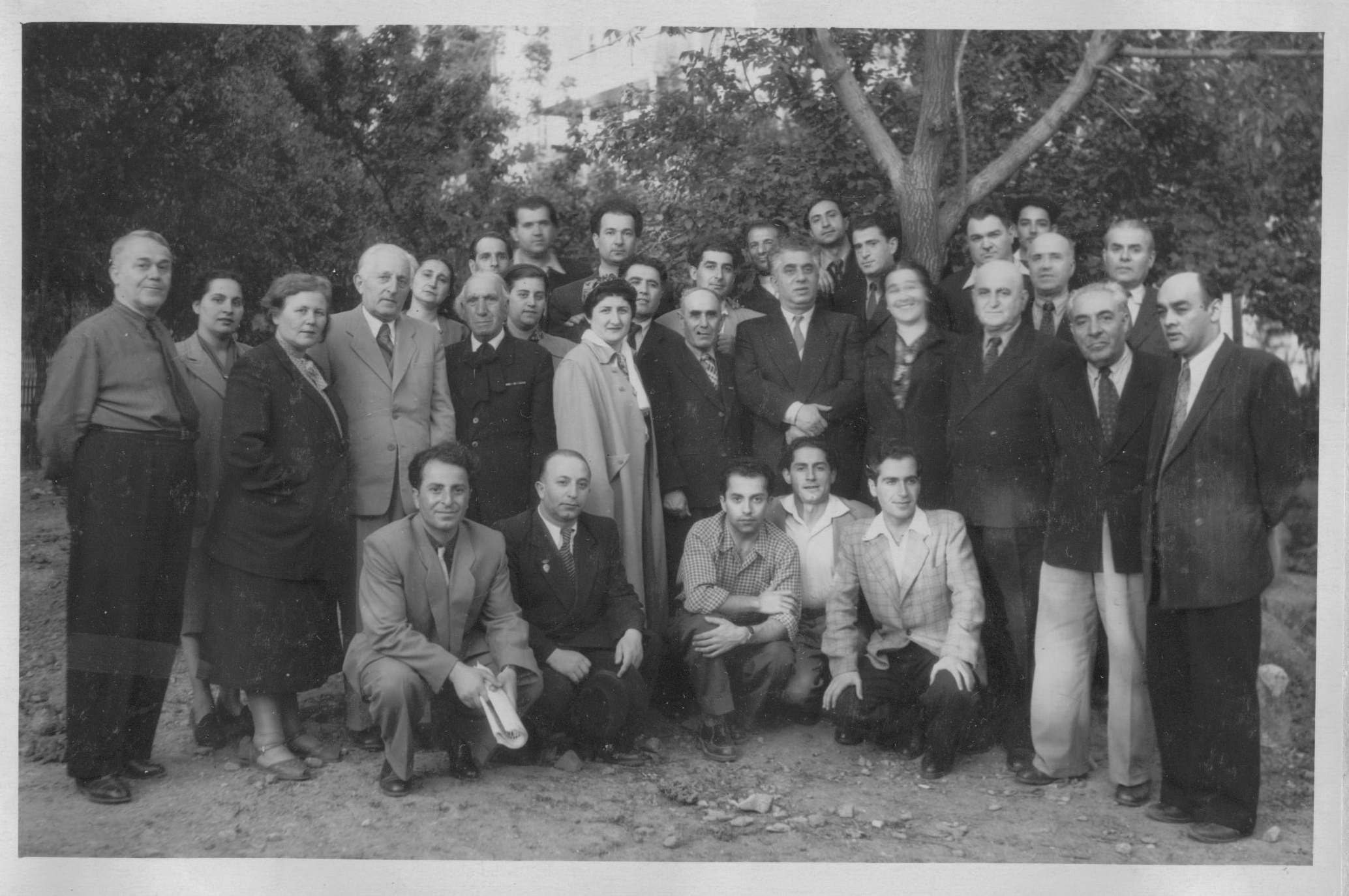
Aram Khachaturian with Armenian composers and musicians in Dilijan

In classical music, many Armenian singers have gained worldwide recognition: sopranos Gohar Gasparyan, Sona Ghazarian, Arpine Pehlivanian, Lucine Amara, Cathy Berberian and, more recently, Isabel Bayrakdarian and Anna Kasyan, mezzo-soprano Tatevik Sazandaryan, tenors Tigran Levonyan, Gegham Grigoryan, and Vahan Mirakyan; basses Ara Berberian, and Henrik Alaverdian, as well as the bass-baritone Barsegh Toumanian.

Cadence Ensemble is an Armenian musical ensemble formed in February 2004 by five classically trained musicians. Initially specialising on works by Argentinian composer Astor Piazzolla, they later included a wider repertoire of American, Armenian, Russian and other European classical and contemporary classical music.

In the diaspora, Armenian musicians such as pianist Şahan Arzruni, violinists Manoug Parikian and Levon Chilingirian, and composers such as Alan Hovhaness, Alicia Terzian, Sirvart Kalpakian Karamanuk have reached international fame.

Armenian-American composer John Hodian created "Songs of Exile", new music based on poetry by the medieval Armenian painter, poet and priest Mkrtich Naghash. With three female vocalists, duduk, oud, dhol and piano, The Naghash Ensemble has been touring internationally since 2014. Their music has been described as a hybrid of "classical music, jazz, folk and post-minimalism" by the German radio station BR Klassik. Scott Giles (b. 1965) is an Armenian-American known for his many symphonies and concertos. Armenian-Canadian composer Vahram Sargsyan (b. 1981) represents the younger generation of Armenian contemporary composers who is mostly known for his choral compositions.

== Jazz ==
The first jazz band of Yerevan was founded in 1936. Soviet jazz was developed by Armenians such as Artemi Ayvazyan, who founded the Armenian State Estrada Orchestra in 1938. Notable performers in the vocal genre have been Georgi Minasian, Artashes Avetyan, Levon Sevan, Elvina Makaryan and Datevik Hovanesian. Tigran Hamasyan is a Gyumri-born contemporary jazz pianist who is strongly influenced by the Armenian folk tradition, often using its scales and modalities.

== Popular music ==
=== Pop music ===
Armenian popular songs have been performed by famous Soviet-era performers such as Norayr Mnatsakanyan, Ofelya Hambardzumyan, Varduhi Khachatryan, and Papin Poghosyan. Suzan Yakar and Udi Hrant Kenkulian were famous cabaret performers in Turkey during the 1920s and 1930s. Other representatives of Soviet-era and modern Armenian pop music include Bella Darbinyan, Raisa Mkrtchyan, and the more contemporary vocal performers such as Elvina Makaryan, Erna Yuzbashyan, Nadezhda Sargsyan, Zara Tonikyan, Syuzan Margaryan, and Datevik Hovanesian. Armenian male pop performers include Ruben Hakhverdyan and diasporan artists Adiss Harmandian, Paul Baghdadlian, Manuel Menengichian and Maxim Panossian. Harout Pamboukjian is a widely popular Soviet Armenian-born singer that currently lives in Los Angeles.

In the 2000s, pop singers such as Sirusho and André represented Armenia in the Eurovision Song Contest. Other popular pop singers include Hasmik Karapetyan, Arsen Safaryan, and Arsen Grigoryan.

==== Rabiz music ====
Rabiz (Armenian: ռաբիզ), or rabis, is a genre of Armenian popular music and a subculture, distinguished by its lyrics and dance-oriented synthesized melodies in 6/8 time signature with elements of Armenian folk music. Despite the term's widespread use, the etymology or definition of the word "rabiz" is not clearly understood. According to some sources it stems from the Russian phrase "работники искусства" (rabotniki iskusstva) used during Soviet times, meaning "Art Workers", in reference to unions which specialized in new music composition.

Played by musicians such as Tatul Avoyan and Hayk Ghevondyan (better known as Spitakci Hayko), rabiz music is also widely popular among by Armenian diasporan communities in Los Angeles and Russia. A subgenre of rabiz music, called "kef" (unrelated to the homonymous Armenian-American kef music), concerns romantic love or partying, but also love of family or patriotism.

The musical language of the rabiz, being a blend of several musical traditions (primarily Armenian national music, called ashug. [Bardic-style] and Eastern in the style of the makam [classical court music]), it is marked by delicate Eastern harmony and an abundance of melisinas, which allow the musician to achieve the desired effect by purely musical means.

Rabiz music has recently seen unexpected international commercial success, especially in Turkey, with "Mi Gna" by Armenian American rapper Super Sako, which features Hayk Ghevondyan, hitting No. 1 on a Shazam Top 100 list and its video garnering over 190 million views on YouTube.

=== Rock ===
Among the rock bands of the older generation were the Arakyalner ("Apostles") of Arthur Meschian, Vostan Hayots, Ayas, and Arevatsaq. Contemporary Armenian rock bands include Sard, Bambir 2, Vordan Karmir, Dogma, Reincarnation, and alternative rock band The Beautified Project. In recent years, Armenian progressive metal bands have emerged in the Armenian rock music scene, featuring bands such as Dorians and Armenian Space Station.

=== Hip-hop ===
Hip-hop music in Armenia is popular primarily amongst the youth. One of the notable Armenian hip-hop bands of the 2000s was Hay Tgheq (Հայ տղեք "Armenian guys"), founded in 2001. Following the band's dissolution, members Misho and HT Hayko started their own solo careers. The most popular Armenian language hip-hop song has been regarded as the 2006 song "Qami Pchi" by the now defunct group HAYQ, composed by Hayk Apricota ( Hayk Harutyunyan), produced by DerHova. In the diaspora, Glendale, California-based rapper R-Mean gained popularity amongst the Armenian community with the song "Open Wounds," which commemorates the Armenian genocide, and started the movement "Open Wounds 1915". Other Armenian rap groups were formed in Germany, such as Armenios, which was founded in Germany by A-Shot, ArmoX & 15Volt. In the 2010s, Armenian-American rapper Super Sako's aforementioned single "Mi Gna" achieved worldwide commercial success and was remixed in over 10 languages and by international artists, such as Maitre Gims (France), Balti (Morocco), and DJ Pantelis (Greece).

== Armenian musicians from the Diaspora ==
There are a large number of musicians of Armenian descent or origin living or born outside of Armenia.

In France, the artist Charles Aznavour (born Aznavourian), of Armenian descent, has been known for his shows and songs over the course of decades. System of a Down, an internationally popular alternative metal band from the United States, was formed by Daron Malakian, Serj Tankian, Shavo Odadjian and John Dolmayan, all of whom are of Armenian American descent. Tankian has also released several solo albums with political and socially conscious content. Malakian is known for his solo project Daron Malakian and Scars on Broadway, often featuring works previously meant for SOAD. Occasional SOAD collaborator Arto Tunçboyacıyan is a well known Turkish musician of Armenian descent, who is famous in Turkey and worldwide, and currently has his own jazz club in Yerevan, Armenia. He was the founder of the Armenian Navy Band.

Keyboardist Derek Sherinian is a well-known rock keyboardist who has played with Alice Cooper, Kiss, and Dream Theater, amongst others. Andy Madadian is an Iranian Armenian artist, and Vigen Derderian is an Iranian Armenian jazz and pop singer. Armik, an Iranian Armenian flamenco guitarist and composer, is a well-known virtuoso of the new flamenco genre. Armenian-American multi-instrumentalist Danny Bedrosian has been the main keyboardist for the Rock and Roll Hall of Fame-inducted band, George Clinton's Parliament-Funkadelic (also known as P-Funk), since 2003. George Mgrdichian, born and raised in New York City, was an Armenian American musician who played several instruments in the jazz genre, including the oud and clarinet.

André Manoukian is a French songwriter and jazz pianist of Armenian descent. He served as a judge on the French version of Pop Idol, Nouvelle Star, for 12 seasons. In 2015, he accompanied Syrian-Armenian singer Lena Chamamyan in the production of modern renditions of Armenian folk songs such as Sareri Hovin Mernem and Moutn'er.

Lena Chamamyan is a Syrian-Armenian singer-songwriter who has become famous for her modernized jazz renditions of traditional Arabic and Armenian folk songs. In 2014, she served as a jury member in "Tsovits Tsov – ArmVision 2014", an international contest for Armenian music at the Kremlin Theatre in Moscow.

Armenian-American Taline and Friends group have played a major role in developing Armenian language skills for children worldwide since the early 1990s.

Ara Topouzian performs on the kanon and VANArmenya, sings both folk, children's and patriotic songs, performs on keyboards, and promotes the music of "the other Gomidas," Grikor Mirzaian Suni.

Angel Deradoorian, also known mononymously as Deradoorian, is a musician of Armenian descent based in Los Angeles, California. She is best known for her work with Dirty Projectors from 2007 to 2012, after which she left to pursue a solo career.

== Armenian musical instruments: etymological origins ==
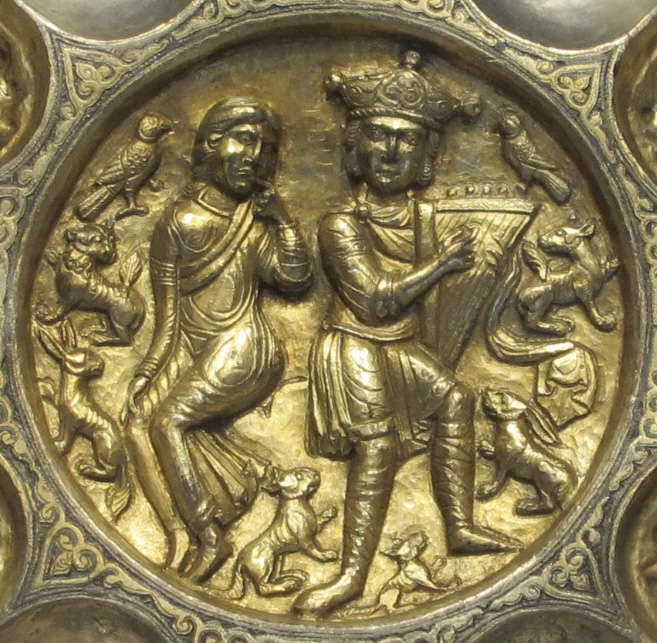
1150-1159, Armenian Kingdom of Cilicia. Artwork on a silver bowl showing Digenes Akritas playing a rota for his wife Eudocia.

The etymology of Armenian musical instrument names offers insights into the ancient linguistic and cultural exchanges that have shaped the Armenian lexicon. Armenian musical terminology draws from three primary linguistic layers: Native Armenian Origins: Terms of Indo-European heritage or composed in Armenian from 5th–4th millennia BCE. Late Indo-European and Mediterranean/European Substrate: Words adopted from neighboring cultures around the 3rd–2nd millennia BCE. Loanwords from Neighboring Languages: Borrowed from languages such as Caucasian, Anatolian, Hurrian, Urartian, Semitic, and Iranian, dating from the 2nd–1st millennia BCE to the present.

=== Instrument 1: knt–nt–ocʻ, knt–knt–ocʻ, ktnt–ocʻ (‘plectrum’) ===
Historical Usage: In classical Armenian texts by Philo, Gregory of Nyssa, Anania, and Vardan Arewelcʻi, the term kntntocʻ described a 'plectrum', evolving in Modern Armenian to mean a 'violin bow'. Linguistic Analysis: Ačaṙyan attributed this term to the onomatopoeic sounds kn and tn. Jahukyan also treated it as onomatopoeic, viewing it as a reduplication. Cross-Linguistic Comparison: This term appears similar to Baltic and Slavic roots, such as Lithuanian gaũsti and Slavic gǫsti, suggesting a shared origin or influence in ancient Eurasian languages.

=== Instrument 2: ǰnar (‘lyre, harp, cithara’) ===
Historical Context and Usage: Used in ancient Armenian literature (such as Severian of Gabala and Grigor Narekac‘i), ǰnar denotes various stringed instruments. Possible Hattic and Greek Origins: Some scholars link ǰnar to the Hattic zinar–, while others propose a connection to Greek κιθάρα (lyre). This could indicate a Mediterranean–Pontic cultural loanword, stemming from a theoretical proto-form ghindhara. Related Words: The Armenian k‘nar is similarly associated with Semitic terms like Aramaic kinnārā and Hebrew kinnōr, possibly indicating a cultural and linguistic exchange through Iranian intermediaries.

=== Instrument 3: sruil (‘musical instrument’) ===
Historical Usage: The term sruil appears in texts by Ephrem the Syrian. Etymology and Linguistic Challenges: Originally derived from the Indo-European su̯er– (to resound), the word poses phonological challenges. Alternative theories suggest an Iranian root, possibly related to the Iranian word for 'horn' (sruuā– in Avestan). Related Terms: The term sruak ('vial' or 'cruet') in Armenian might also derive from an Iranian source, showing the influence of neighboring cultures on Armenian musical vocabulary.

== Samples ==
- Recording of "Erivan bachem arer", an Armenian-American folk song from the Library of Congress' California Gold: Northern California Folk Music from the Thirties Collection; performed a cappella by Ruben J. Baboyan on 16 April 1939 in Fresno, California

== See also ==
- Armenian culture
- Armenian dance
- Armenian opera
- Armenian lullabies
