= Valya Samvelyan =

Armenian singer (1937–1990)

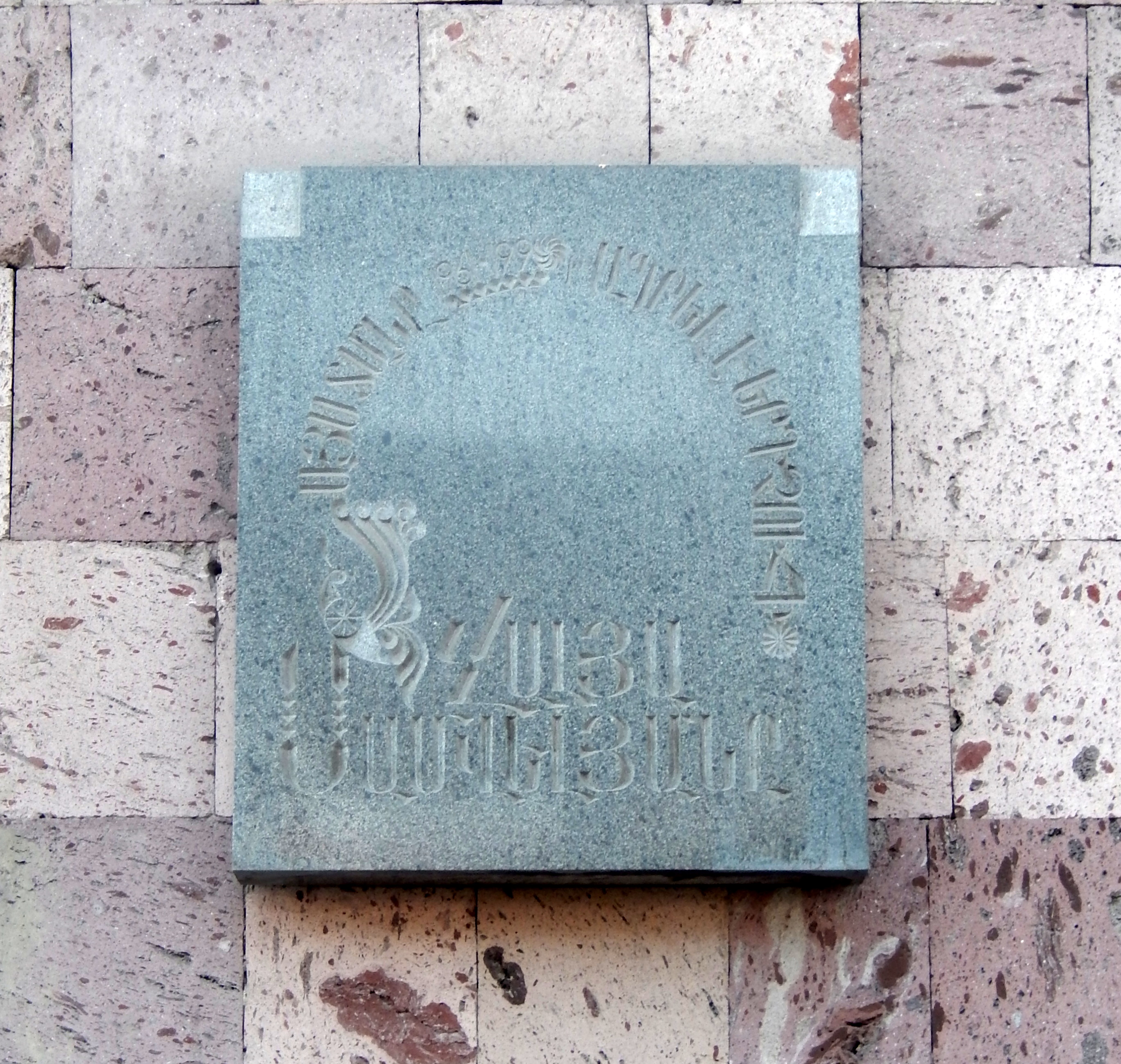

Valya Samvelyan (Armenian: Վալյա Սամվելյան; born 12 August 1937 in Yerevan – died 3 December 1990 in Yerevan) was an Armenian singer (mezzo-soprano), performer of a number of folk and ashugh songs.

She was born on August 12, 1937 in Yerevan. Her father, Vardan Samvelyan, was the chairman of the church council, and her mother, Vergine Badalyan, sang in the choir of the St. Hovhannes (St. John) Church.

She developed her love for Armenian music thanks to her parents; and chose her first performances from the old songbook of her grandfather (who was from Van). From an early age she listened to Armenian folk and gusan songs performed by Shara Talyan, Armenak Ter-Abrahamyan, Vagharshak Sahakyan, Araksya Gyulzadyan, Shoghik Mkrtchyan, and then Ofelia Hambardzumyan and Hovhannes Badalyan, and she wanted to become a folk singer.

She worked at "Hayelectro", then at a device-making factory, continuing to sing in a self-made ensemble, where she met her future husband, the artistic director of the "Folk Instrument" orchestra and tar player Karlen Gevorgyan.

She died in a car accident in 1990.

== Career ==
Valya Samvelyan took her first steps in the singing field in the school choir. Unfortunately, for some reason she did not manage to get a musical education and started her artistic career as an amateur. While working at the tire factory she set a song and dance ensemble, and toured and performed in different regions of Armenia, as well as in Ukraine, Belarus, the Baltic countries, France, Spain, Syria, Lebanon and Belgium.

In 1957, she won the first prize in the singing category at the Armenian Youth Festival and wasg awarded a gold medal. Later at other competitions she got three other gold medals as well as various diplomas.

Valya Samvelyan established herself as a soloist of the Aram Merangulyan Folk Instruments Orchestra of the Public Radio of Armenia (where she was admitted after winning a competition organzied by the Radio of Armenia). She performed as part of the ensemble for 38 years, until the last days of her life. Famous Armenian singers Araksya Gyulzadyan, Shoghik Mkrtchyan, Ofelia Hambardzumyan, Hovhannes Badalyan, Norayr Mnatsakanyan, Ruben Matevosyan, Raffi Hovhannisyan and Manik Grigoryan sang at the ensemble. Samvelyan's performance included musical pieces by Komitas, Sayat-Nova, Alexey Hekimyan, Khachatur Avetisyan, Aram Satunts, Khachatur Nersisyan, gusan Ashot, gusan Shahen, gusan Havasi and others. Among the most popular songs in her interpretation were "Anushik im quyrik (My sweet sister)", "Antsar aygus nayelov (You passed looking at my garden)", "Zov gisher (Cool night)" and "Shorora (Walk gracefully)" by Sayat-Nova, gusan Sheram, Alexey Hekimyan, and others.

She has released disks at the "Melodia" record company (Moscow, Russia) and in the USA. Se has performed in concerts in a number of countries around the world.

Her son Ara Gevorgyan is the producer of her posthumous "Toghetsir indz menak" ("You left me alone") and "Anushik im quyrik" ("My sweet sister") albums.
