= Norayr Mnatsakanyan =

Armenian artist

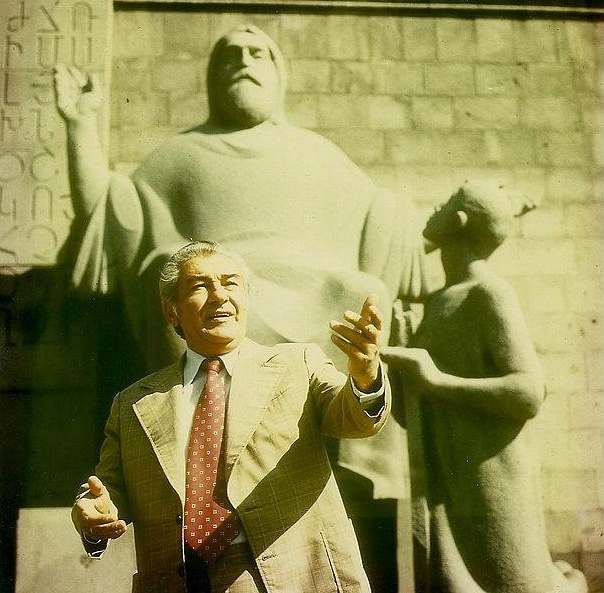
- Mnatsakanyan in 1983
- Born: January 7, 1923; Yerevan
- Died: March 25, 1986 (aged 63)
- Awards: Merited Artist of the Armenian Soviet Socialist Republic (1965)

Norayr Mnatsakanyan (Armenian: Նորայր Մնացականյան, January 7, 1923 – March 25, 1986) was a Merited Artist of the Armenian Soviet Socialist Republic (1965).

As a vocal performer of Armenian traditional and gusans' music, Mnatsakanyan is a vocalist in the canon of Armenian national music. Owing to his baritone voice, knowledge of Armenian folk music, and knowledge of the Armenian language and Armenian literature, Mnatsakanyan is a writer, musicologist, and lover of Armenian folk music.

Mnatsakanyan was the first among Armenian vocalists to introduce a new approach to popular songs, as well as to the musical compilations of historic and contemporary gusans (Armenian minstrels). As an accepted convention of any national folklore, the works of Armenian popular and gusans music were performed in a rustic fashion. Professional performers of opera and classical music also tried to perform these works. However, their efforts took them away from ordinary Armenian people by rendering them in the elitist operatic genre in Soviet Armenia. With his poetic approach to these works of traditional Armenian and Gusans music, Mnatsakanyan was the first vocalist to present them in a refined and natural fashion. Unlike his predecessors, Mnatsakanyan attempted to convey these works with use of harmony. Mnatsakanyan also attempted to eliminate the provincial character of the songs. Being an art critic himself, Mnatsakanyan always conveyed great significance to the unity of the melody and the lyrics in whatever he performed.

Norayr Mnatsakanyan also performed songs by famous Armenian composers interwoven with lyrics by such Armenian poets, such as Avetik Isahakian, Vahan Terian, Hovhannes Shiraz. Avetik Isahakian valued Mnatsakanyan's contributions to the canon of Armenian performing arts and proclaimed Norayr "the velvety voice" of Armenia. Derenik Demirchian called Mnatsakanyan "a unique vocal interpreter of the popular consciousness, scattered bits of which are present in every Armenian individual."

== Biography ==
Norayr Mnatsakanyan was born on January 7, 1923, in an old Yerevan family. He inherited the love for traditional music from his parents. Possessing an ever singing spirit of a talented youth, Norayr Mnatsakanyan won his first prize at the young performers' competition held in Moscow in 1936. Owing to his extraordinary vocal qualities and his passion for acting, Mnatsakanyan started his career as actor and singer at the Yerevan State Theater of Musical Comedy after Hakob Paronian. As surprising as it may seem, Mnatsakanyan played the first Gikor on the Armenian stage in the namesake performance based on Hovhannes Tumanyan's famous novel. Mnatsakanyan's artistic talent and his reverence for the Theater drove him to work with such eminent theatrical stage directors as Armen Gulakian. Mnatsakanyan also had the honor of working with the "titans" of the Armenian theatrical arts at the Yerevan State Academic Theater after Gabriel Sundukian: Vahram Papazian, Hrachia Nersisyan, Avet Avetisyan, Hambardzum Khachanyan, Babken Nersisyan, Metaksia Simonyan, the late Mher Mkrtchyan, and Khoren Abrahamyan. Norayr Mnatsakanyan's acting, apart from his artistic talent, vouched for his unsurpassed mastery of World Literature. After seeing Mnatsakanyan's rehearsal in the role of the Shakespearean Othello, Vahram Papazian highly praised Norayr for his excellent rendition of Othello's protagonistic pathos and antagonistic callousness, and foresaw a bright future for him in acting. Mnatsakanyan later played one of the leading roles in A Man from Olympus (Chelovek iz Olimpa)(Armenfilm, 1974).

Purporting to pursue a more worldly profession, Norayr Mnatsakanyan held a Master of Arts degree from the Department of Philology of the Yerevan State University. Upon his graduation, Mnatsakanyan defended a dissertation with a thesis on "Sayat Nova's Lyric Poetry in the Armenian Literary Milieux." Mnatsakanyan proceeded with a professional career as a journalist and a freelance writer. With his unconventional disposition, Norayr Mnatsakanyan authored an anthology of short novels dedicated to the old city of Yerevan, depicting its people's way of life, its customs and traditions. As a journalist, Mnatsakanyan's articles and critiques on various issues of the Armenian arts and culture frequented the pages of many Armenian periodicals. One of Mnatsakanyan's most groundbreaking articles was dedicated to the famous Armenian duduk players of the past and the present: Margar Margarian, Levon Madoyan, Vatche Housepian, and Djivan Gasparyan. Mnatsakanyan also hosted a special program in 1985, the heyday of his artistic career, on the Public Television of Armenia, which was about the instrumental and stylistic distinctions of the duduk and its most outstanding players.

Despite his background in acting and writing, Mnatsakanyan primarily focused on singing. He gained recognition among Armenian music audiences both domestically and internationally. Mnatsakanyan's musical career advanced further when Tatoul Altunian invited him to perform as a soloist with the State Philharmonic Chapel's Ensemble of Song and Dance. During his time there, he collaborated with Araksia Gyulzadian and Varduhi Khachatrian. In addition to his Sayat Nova repertoire, Mnatsakanyan performed popular songs and works by traditional gusans (minstrels) such as Sheram, Ashot, Jivani, Havasi, along with compilations of urban folklore.

However, the inviolable right of Norayr Mnatsakanyan's achievement consists in his performances of Sayat Nova's works. His performances of Sayat Nova imbued the Bard's poetry with lyricism and spirituality. It is through Norayr Mnatsakanyan's rendition of Sayat Nova that the ethical and metaphysical peculiarities in the works become apparent. The singer grieves and rejoices with the poet, feeling every tremble of the great Bard's heart. It is Norayr Mnatsakanyan's voice that brings us the songs of Sayat Nova in the namesake movie (1960).

Mnatsakanyan's performances became a lot more accessible to the general public, when Aram Merangulian invited Norayr to perform as a soloist in his Ensemble of Folk Instruments of the Armenian National Radio and Television. Mnatsakanyan's songs are possible to find in several Armenian films, including Sergei Parajanov's The Color of Pomegranates (1969), also dedicated to the life of Sayat Nova. A piece of Mnatsakanyan's unique rendition of the traditional Dle Yaman also appears in the background of Andrew Goldberg's The Armenian Americans (2000). A number of documentaries were shot on Mnatsakanyan's life and activity intermitted by his own performances. Throughout his lifetime, the vocalist recorded over two hundred traditional and gusans songs, all of which are held as relics by the Museum Fund of the Public Radio and Television of Armenia. His performances have paved the way for many successors in the traditional vocal genre.

Norayr Mnatsakanyan performed in many countries where Armenians had set foot and had established their communities. During his tour of the Middle Eastern countries, Norayr Mnatsakanyan received an honorary gold medal from King Hussein of Jordan after his concert in Amman (1979), which His Majesty attended with Queen Noor. Mnatsakanyan's performance of Sayat Nova brought him the highest honors at the Festival of Traditional Music in Lyon, France (1981). Subsequently, upon the request of the smaller Armenian communities in Luxembourg, Belgium, and the Netherlands, Mnatsakanyan performed in a tributary concert at the Conservatoire de Luxembourg Hall (1981).

In the annual ceremony of the Armenian Music Awards, held in Los Angeles for the year 1999, Mnatsakanyan posthumously received a lifetime achievement award for his worthwhile contributions to Armenian music, and his album of traditional and gusans' compilations, named Husher (Reminiscences) (Parseghian Records, 1999) was recognized as the year's best traditional album.

In 2005, Narek Productions, with the support of the Public Radio of Armenia, launched a record, called "I Sing a Song," composed of Norayr Mnatsakanyan's performances of the most famous Armenian gusans' works.

== Further information ==
- Armenian Radio Archive - Norayr Mnatsakanyan
- AV Production - An Online Encyclopedia of Armenian Culture
- "Norayr Mnatsakanyan: the Velvety Voice of Armenia" ("Yerevan" Studios, 1983)
- "Canticle of Canticles," AMPTV, 2014
- "After Nahapet Hayk," AMPTV, 2007
- "Confession," Armenian Public Radio, 2011
- «Sayat Nova» (Armenfilm, 1960)
- Select Performances
