= Lusik Koshyan =

- Born: Լուսիկ Քոշյան; April 2, 1921; Baku, Azerbaijani SSR
- Died: October 26, 1984; Yerevan, Armenian SSR, USSR
- Occupation: Armenian folk singer

Lusik Koshyan (Armenian: Լուսիկ Քոշյան, April 2, 1921, Baku, Azerbaijani SSR – October 26, 1984, Yerevan, Armenian SSR, USSR) was an Armenian folk singer, awarded the title of People's Artist of the Armenian SSR in 1961.

== Biography ==
Lusik Koshyan was born in Baku, Azerbaijani SSR. From 1938 to 1961, she was the leading soloist of the Armenian Folk Song and Dance Ensemble, and from 1961 to 1984, a soloist of the Armenian State Philharmonic. Her performing mastery was shaped within the ensemble under the guidance of Tatul Altunyan, Ilya Arbatov, and E. Manukyan. Through her performances, songs such as “Bingyol,” “Machkal,” “Yes pujchur em,” “Lusnyak gisher” (“Moonlit Night”), and “Jaghats’ patik-patik,” as well as works by the gusan singers Jivani, Sheram, Havasi, Ashot, and Shahen, gained wide recognition. She performed in cities across the USSR and abroad. She was awarded the Order of the Badge of Honor and, in 1961, was granted the title of People's Artist of the Armenian SSR. She died in Yerevan.

== Sources ==
This article incorporates text from the Armenian Soviet Encyclopedia, which is available under the Creative Commons Attribution-ShareAlike 3.0 Unported License.
