= Ofelya Hambardzumyan =

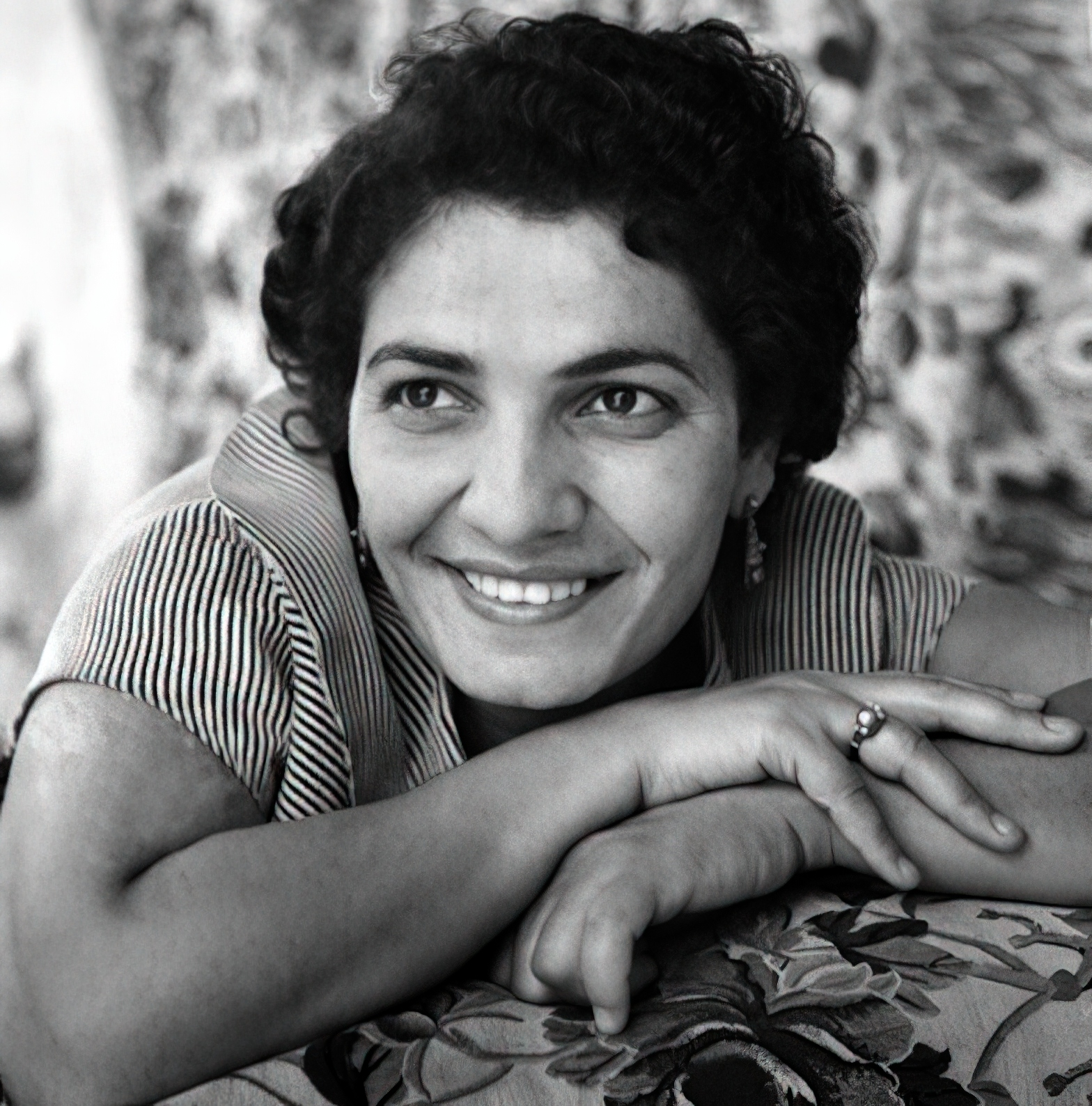

Background information
- Born: Օֆելյա Կարապետի Համբարձումյան; Офе́лия Ка́рапетовна Амбарцумя́н; Ofelya Karapeti Hambardzumyan; January 9, 1925; Yerevan, Armenian Soviet Socialist Republic, Transcaucasian Socialist Federative Soviet Republic, USSR
- Origin: Armenian
- Died: June 13, 2016 (aged 91) Yerevan, Armenia
- Genres: folk, ashugh, popular

Ofelya Karapeti Hambardzumyan (Armenian: Օֆելյա Կարապետի Համբարձումյան, January 9, 1925 – June 13, 2016) was an Armenian folk singer.

== Biography ==
She was born in Yerevan, Armenia SSR, on January 9, 1925. From a young age, she was recognized for her beautiful voice. She underwent vocal training at the Romanos Melikyan Musical College. In 1944, she became a solo singer for the Ensemble of Folk Instruments of the Radio of Armenia, where she dedicated her efforts to the ensemble headed by Aram Merangulyan.

Her repertoire included classical Armenian music, ashughakan music, and folk songs. She was especially recognized for her interpretations of ashugh Sayat-Nova's songs, such as "Յարէն էրուած իմ Yaren ervac im", "Յիս կանչում եմ լալանին Yis kanchum em lalanin", and others. She also performed music by Fahrad, Jivani, and Sheram. In addition, she performed songs by her contemporaries Ashughs, Gusan Shahen, Havasi, and Gusan Ashot; she was often the first to perform them.

Ofelya Hambardzumyan died on June 13, 2016, in Yerevan.

== Awards ==
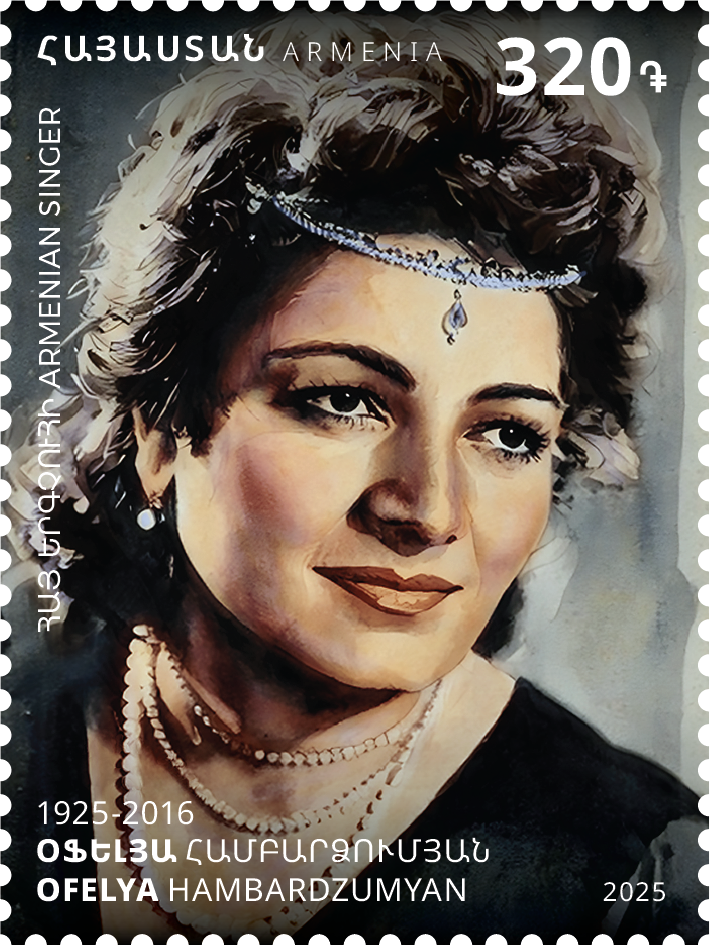
Hambardzumyan on a 2025 stamp of Armenia

- People's Artist of Armenian SSR (1959)
- Mesrop Mashtots Medal for significant contribution to the art of Armenian song
