= Gohar Gasparyan =

Armenian opera singer (1924–2007)

Gohar Gasparyan Գոհար Գասպարյան
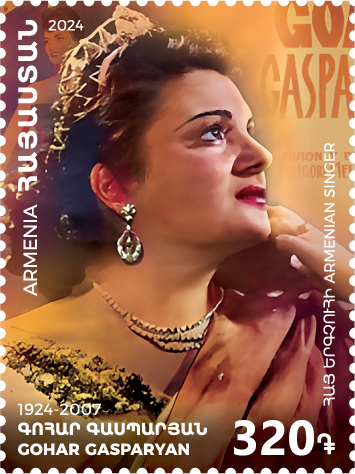
- Gasparyan on a 2024 stamp of Armenia

Background information
- Born: Gohar Mikayeli Khachaturian; 14 December 1924; Cairo, Egypt
- Died: 15 May 2007 (aged 82) Yerevan, Armenia
- Genre: Classical
- Occupation: Opera singer
- Instrument: Singing

Gohar Mikayeli Gasparyan (Note: Armenian: Գոհար Միքայելի Գասպարյան, romanized: Gohar Mik’ayeli Gasparyan; Western Armenian: Գոհար Գասպարեան, romanized: Kohar Kasbarean), sometimes given as Goar Gasparjan, (14 December 1924 – 16 May 2007, née Khachaturian), (Note: Armenian: Խաչատուրյան, romanized: Xačatowryan; Western Armenian: Խաչատրեան, romanized: Khachʻadrean) also known as the "Armenian nightingale", was an Armenian opera singer.

== Life ==
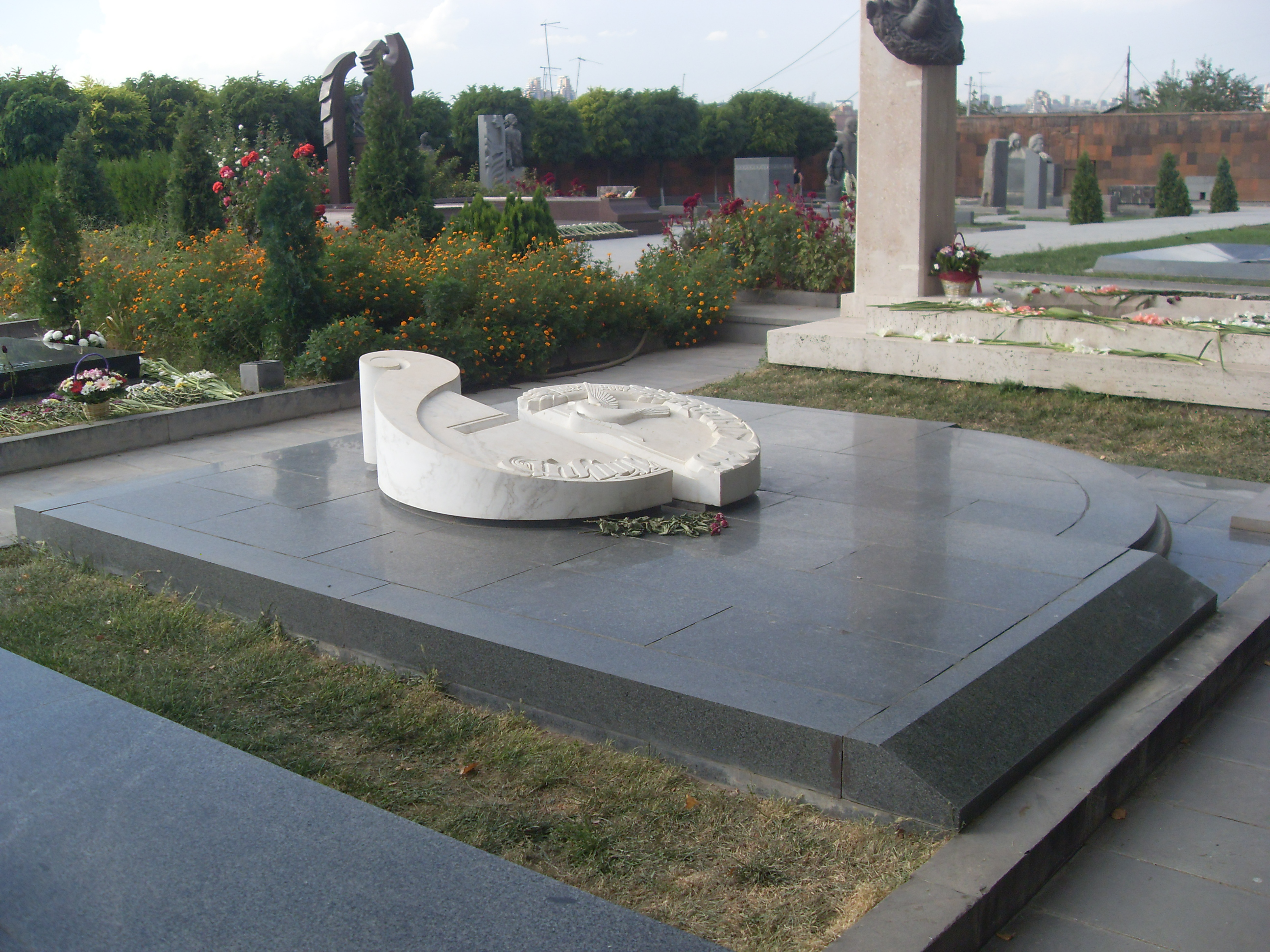
Gasparyan's grave

Born in an Armenian family in Cairo, Egypt, Gasparyan studied at a Music Academy in the city. In 1948, she migrated to Soviet Armenia along with thousands of other Armenians from the Middle East. Gasparyan performed at the Yerevan Opera Theatre in 23 operas during her long career, as well as performing at concerts. In 1951 she was the soprano in A Heroine by Haro Stepanian in Yerevan. This opera won one of "Stalin's music prizes".

She also taught at the Yerevan State Musical Conservatory. Gasparyan was a People's Artist of the USSR, a Hero of Socialist Labour and a Mesrop Mashtots order-bearer.

Gohar Gasparyan died in Yerevan and is buried at Komitas Pantheon.

== Awards ==
- Order of St. Mesrop Mashtots (14 December 1994)
- Hero of Socialist Labour (11 December 1984)
- Order of Lenin (11 December 1984)
- Order of Friendship of Peoples (7 August 1981)
- People's Artist of the USSR (1956)
- People's Artist of the Armenian SSR (1954)
- Stalin Prize 1st class (1951)

== See also ==
- Armenian opera
