= Lusine Zakaryan =

Lusine Zakaryan Լուսինե Զաքարյան
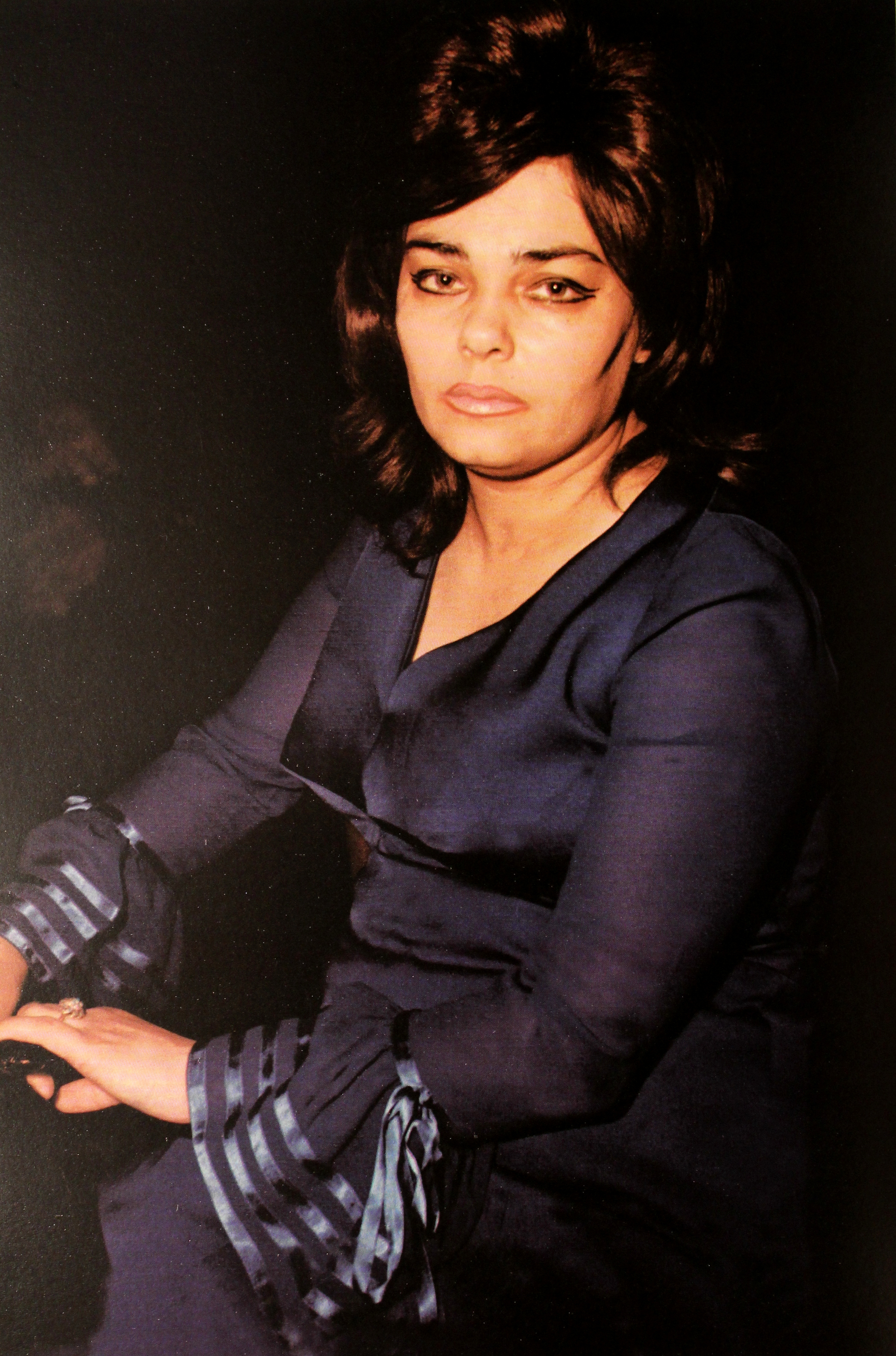

Background information
- Born: Svetlana Zakaryan; Սվետլանա Զաքարյան სვეტლანა ზაქარიანი June 1, 1937; Akhaltsikhe, Georgian SSR
- Origin: Armenian
- Died: December 30, 1992 (aged 55) Yerevan, Armenia
- Genres: Opera, Armenian church music, traditional
- Occupation: soprano
- Instrument: voice
- Award: People's Artist of the Armenian SSR (1972)
- Website: lzm.am

Lusine Zakaryan (Armenian: Լուսինե Զաքարյան), born Svetlana Zakaryan (Armenian: Սվետլանա Զաքարյան; June 1, 1937 – December 30, 1992), was an Armenian soprano.

Zakaryan was born in Akhaltsikhe, Georgian SSR, and grew up in the Samtskhe-Javakheti region of southern Georgia. In 1952, she moved with her family to Yerevan, where she attended a secondary music school. She entered the Yerevan State Musical Conservatory in 1957 and her singing talent soon became apparent.

From 1970 to 1983, Zakaryan was a soloist with the symphony orchestra of Armenian TV and Radio. She also sang in the choir of the Armenian Apostolic Church's Holy See at the Etchmiadzin Cathedral, and it is for her renditions of centuries-old Armenian spiritual hymns that she is now most remembered.

Zakaryan was also known for singing the international opera repertoire as well as Armenian traditional and church music.

In July 1968, Zakaryan married the former priest Khoren Palian, also a noted singer of church music.

Zakaryan died in Yerevan, Armenia, and was buried at Saint Gayane Church in Etchmiadzin.
