= Araksia Gyulzadyan =

Araksia Gyulzadyan Արաքսյա Գյուլզադյան
- Born: Արաքսյա Կարապետի Գյուլզադյան; Араксия Карапетовна Гюлзадян; Araksia Karapeti Gyulzadyan; June 5, 1907; Gyumri, Russian Empire
- Origin: Armenian
- Died: October 7, 1980 (aged 73) Yerevan, Armenian SSR
- Genres: Folk, ashugh

Araksia Gyulzadyan (Armenian: Արաքսյա Գյուլզադյան, June 5, 1907, Alexandropol – October 7, 1980, Yerevan) was an Armenian canonical singer of folk and ashugh music. She was awarded the People's Artist of Armenia honorary title in 1950.

== Biography ==
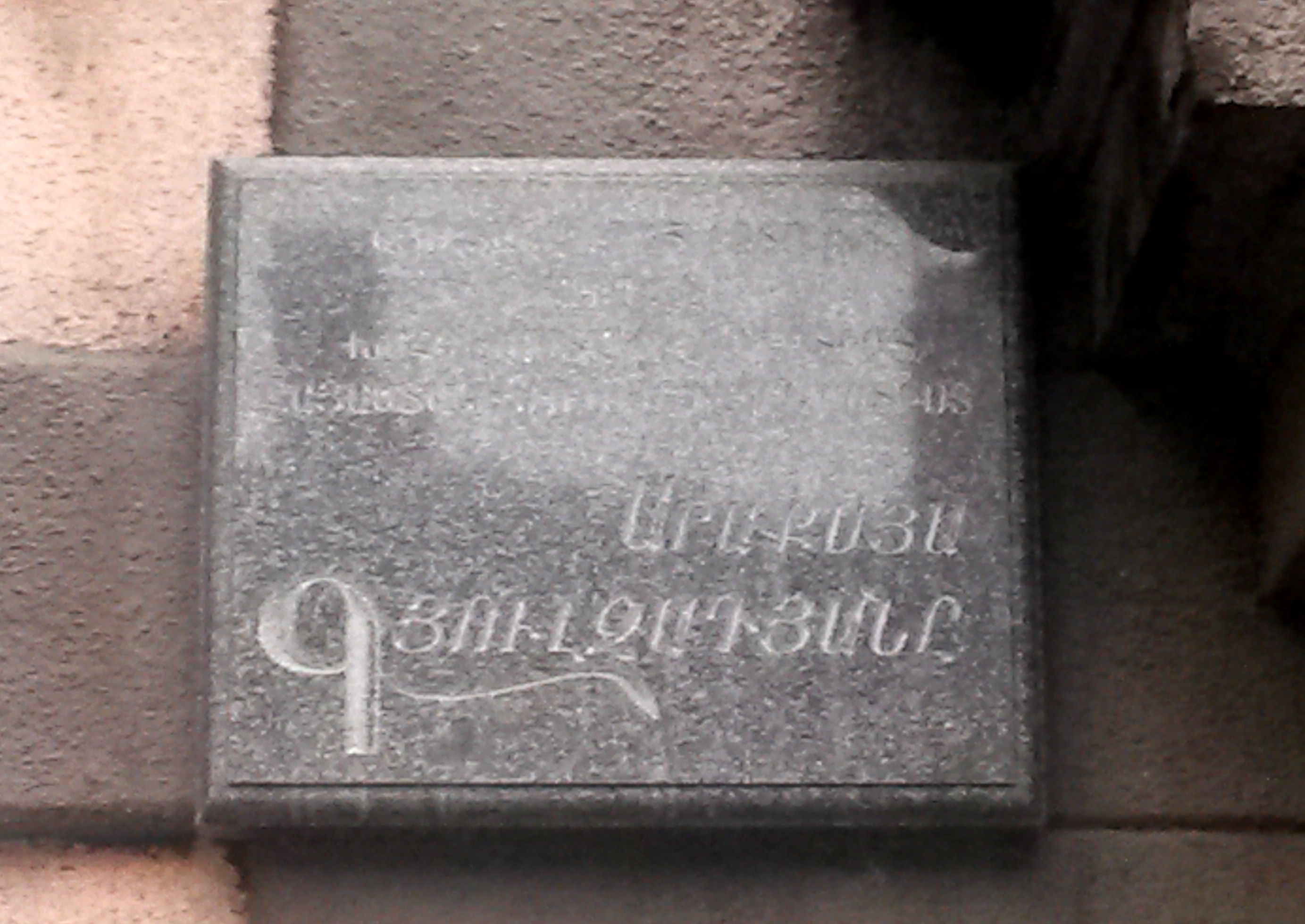
Araksya Gyulzadyan's plaque, Yerevan

As a young child, she became a solo singer at a church in Gyumri. She finished the primary school in her native town and moved to Yerevan in 1926, where Romanos Melikian became one of her teachers. She was the solo singer of the Armenian Radio Orchestra of Folk Instruments until 1955. She was also a solo performer at the Armenian Philharmonic.

She is also known for her performances of Sheram's songs.

== Discography ==
- Husher, 1999
