= Alexey Ekimyan =

Armenian composer (1927–1982)

- Born: April 10, 1927; Baku, Azerbaijani SSR, Soviet Union
- Died: April 24, 1982 (aged 55) Moscow
- Genres: Pop
- Occupations: Composer, General
- Years active: 1950s–1982

Alexey Ekimyan (Armenian: Ալեքսեյ Հեքիմյան, Russian: Алексей Гургенович Экимян) also Alexey Gurgenovich Hekimyan (April 10, 1927 – April 24, 1982) was a famous Armenian composer, and writer of popular songs. Ekimyan was also a General of Soviet militsia (police) and was the head of the Criminal Investigation Department of Moscow region. He was considered the only popular composer in the world who ruled a law-enforcement department at the same time. Ekimyan awarded by the "Renowned Master of the Arts" Armenian SSR official title.

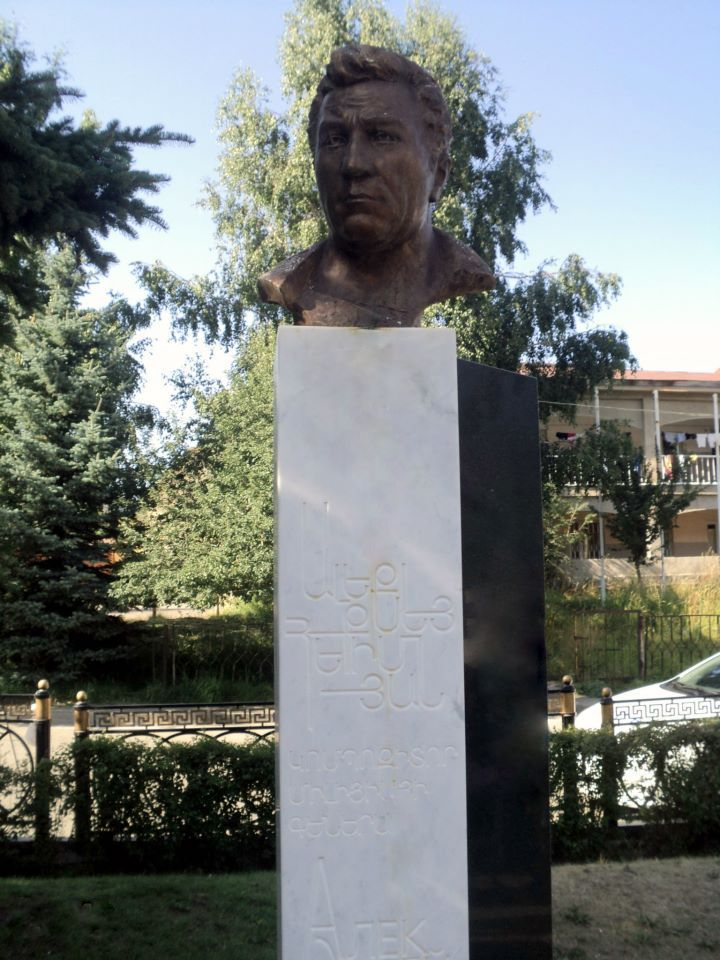

Born in Baku, Ekimyan's first song for the Moscow International Festival (1957) was approved by Vano Muradeli ("I don't know if you would become a general, but you would become a composer!"). His songs were performed and recorded by prominent Soviet singers that include Lyudmila Zykina ("I don't need another love"), Iosif Kobzon, Lusine Zakaryan, Muslim Magomayev ("Save the friends"), Sofia Rotaru, Vakhtang Kikabidze, Ruben Matevosian ("Gharabaghtsin"). Among his most famous songs are- "Listopad", "Vsya jizn' vperedi", "Sonjachnyj doshh", "Odinochestvo" (written by poets Robert Rozhdestvensky, Rasul Gamzatov, and others). Aram Khachaturian wrote: "The melodies of Ekimyan are amazingly beautiful, expressive, plastic and always natural". Some hits by Ekimyan were chosen for the "Song of the Year" all-Soviet festivals during the 1970s-'80s.

The documentary film-concert "Paths of My Memory" (1979, 27 min.) by Yerevan Studio is dedicated to Alexey Ekimyan. His "Do not be sad" hit was used as a songtrack for the "Nu Pogodi" Soviet animated film series.

Ekimyan suffered a heart attack and died on April 24, 1982, in Moscow. He is buried in Yerevan, Armenia.

Ekimyan was married to Valentina Karpova. They had two sons, Rafael and Michael. Rafael went on to become Section Chief of the Regional Department of organized crime within Headquarters of Internal Affairs of Moscow Region. While Michael became a famous composer for the Moscow Circus.

== Honours and awards ==
- Order of the Red Star
- Medal "For Military Merit"
- Medal "For the Victory over Germany in the Great Patriotic War 1941–1945"
- Jubilee Medal "In Commemoration of the 100th Anniversary since the Birth of Vladimir Il'ich Lenin"
- Medal "For Distinction in the Protection of Public Order"
- Jubilee Medal "50 Years of the Soviet Militia"
- Medal "For Impeccable Service" 1st, 2nd and 3rd classes

== Discography ==
- Artashes Avetyan sings: songs by Alexey Ekimyan, U.S.S.R.: Melodiya, 1978 (LP). C60-10619-20
- Alexey Ekimyan. Beregite druzey..., Russia: Melodia, 2006 (CD)
- Alexey Ekimyan. Vot i vstretilis, Russia: Melodia, 2007 (CD)
