= Babken Nersisyan =

Armenian actor (1917–1986)

- Բաբկեն Ներսիսյան
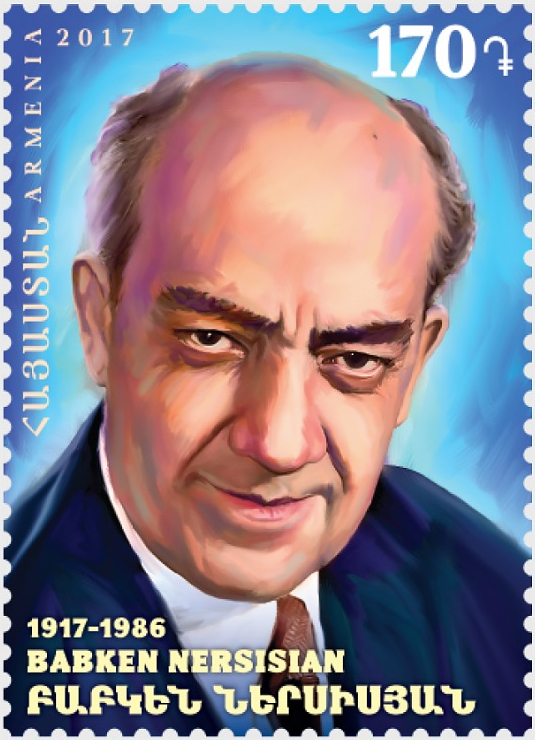
- Nersisyan on a 2018 Armenian stamp
- Born: 18 July 1917; Tiflis, Tiflis Governorate, Russian Empire
- Died: 14 February 1986 (aged 68); Yerevan, Armenian SSR, Soviet Union
- Occupation: Actor
- Years active: 1933–1986

Babken Poghosi Nersisyan (Armenian: Բաբկեն Ներսիսյան; Georgian: ბაბკენ ნერსესიანი; 18 July [O.S. 5 July] 1917 – 14 February 1986) was an Armenian stage and film actor. After beginning his career in the Armenian theatre in Tbilisi, he became a leading actor of the Sundukyan State Academic Theatre in Yerevan and was named a People's Artist of the USSR in 1972.

== Early life ==
Nersisyan was born on 18 July 1917 in Tiflis to an Armenian family whose parents had moved there from Mush. He began acting in 1933 in Tbilisi.

== Career ==
From 1934 Nersisyan worked at the Armenian theatre for young spectators in Tbilisi, and from 1944 to 1955 he was an actor of the Tbilisi Armenian Drama Theatre (now the Petros Adamian Tbilisi State Armenian Drama Theatre). In 1956, on the invitation of the director Vardan Ajemyan, he moved to Armenia and joined the Sundukyan State Academic Theatre in Yerevan, where he remained until his death.

He played character, comic and tragic roles, among them Pepo in Sundukyan's Pepo (which he also performed in Georgian at the Rustaveli Theatre) and Arbenin in Lermontov's Masquerade. He was also a noted master of artistic recitation. From 1957 he appeared in films, including the title role in Sayat-Nova (1960). He died in 1986.

== Awards and honours ==
- Honoured Artist of the Georgian SSR (1955)
- People's Artist of the Armenian SSR (1961)
- People's Artist of the USSR (1972)
- Order of the Red Banner of Labour

== Personal life and legacy ==
Nersisyan's son, Tigran Nersisyan, also became an actor. He died in Yerevan on 14 February 1986 and was buried at the Tokhmakh Cemetery. For the centenary of his birth, a monument to him was unveiled in Yerevan in 2018, and Armenia issued a commemorative postage stamp in his honour.
