= Mokats Mirza =

Armenian folk song

Mokats Mirza (Armenian: Մոկաց Միրզա) is a medieval Armenian folk song, sometimes considered as a ballad. The song originates from Moxoene. Four versions of the song have survived, all of them in the Mokats dialect. The song gained popularity in the Armenian Highlands, after it was recorded by Komitas. The content of the song is the following. Supposedly, the Kurdish Kolot Pasha invites the ishkhan Mokats Mirza to Zezire. Kolot Pasha poisons Mokats Mirza in order to marry his wife. Afterwards Mokats Mirza was buried in Malakava.
