= Nairuhi Alaverdyan =

Azerbaijani Soviet folk singer and dancer (1941–2021)

- Born: 25 June 1941; Stepanakert, Nagorno-Karabakh, Azerbaijan Soviet Socialist Republic
- Died: 10 November 2021 (aged 80) Stepanakert, Azerbaijan
- Occupations: Folk singer and dancer
- Awards: People's Artist of the Azerbaijan SSR (1982); Order of St. Mesrop Mashtots of the Republic of Armenia (2001); Honored Artist of the Republic of Armenia (2005)

Nairuhi Isahak Alaverdyan (Armenian: Նաիրուհի Ալավերդյան, Persian: نایروهی آلاوردیان, 25 June 1941 – 10 November 2021) was an Azerbaijani Soviet folk singer and dancer. She was a People's Artist of the Azerbaijan SSR (1982) and was appointed to the Order of St. Mesrop Mashtots of the Republic of Armenia (2001) and as an Honored Artist of the Republic of Armenia (2005).

== Biography ==
Alaverdyan was born on 25 June 1941 in Stepanakert, Nagorno-Karabakh, Azerbaijan Soviet Socialist Republic. She graduated from Stepanakert Music College in 1968.

Alaverdyan was a folk singer and dancer who performed as a soloist for the Karabakh Variety Ensemble. In 1982, Alaverdyan was honoured as a People's Artist of the Azerbaijan SSR. Alaverdyan's repertoire included Armenian folk songs and she was appointed to the Order of St. Mesrop Mashtots of the Republic of Armenia in 2001 and as an Honored Artist of the Republic of Armenia in 2005.

Alaverdyan died on 10 November 2021, aged 80.
