= Tagh =

Armenian song genre

The tagh (Armenian: տաղ) is a genre of Armenian monodic song writing. Its origin is ancient but its content and melodic line can be similar to modern vocal and instrumental compositions.

The characteristics of the tagh are its expansiveness of form and volume, its free melodic style, the existence of instrumental passages and richness of rhythm. The tagh is basically a lyric song but it is not canonic like the sharakan. There are two types of taghs—religious and secular. St.Narekatsi's taghs are the unsurpassed monuments of this musical style.
