= Order of St. Mesrop Mashtots =

State order of Armenia

Order of St. Mesrop Mashtots Armenian: Սուրբ Մեսրոպ Մաշտոցի շքանշան
- The Order of St. Mesrop Mashtots
- Awarded for: Significant achievements in economic development of Armenia, natural and social sciences, inventions, culture, education, healthcare, public service and activities promoting cooperation with foreign countries
- Country: Armenia
- Presented by: President of Armenia
- Eligibility: Armenian citizens, foreign citizens and stateless persons
- Status: Active
- Established: July 26, 1993
- Total: 44
- Ribbon of the order of St. Mesrop Mashtoc

Precedence
- Next (higher): Order of Saint Vardan Mamikonian

The Order of St. Mesrop Mashtots (Armenian: Սուրբ Մեսրոպ Մաշտոցի շքանշան) is awarded for significant achievements in economic development of Armenia, natural and social sciences, inventions, culture, education, healthcare, and public service, as well as for activities promoting scientific, technological, economic and cultural cooperation with foreign countries. The law on the St. Mesrop Mashtots Order has been in effect since July 26, 1993. It is named after Mesrop Mashtots.

== Awards granted ==
Name	Field	Year of award
Khoren Abrahamyan	Cinema / Theatre	2000
Valdas Adamkus	Politics	2002
Ivan Aivazovsky	Painting / Posthumous	1997
Nairuhi Alaverdyan	Music	2001
Levon Aronian	Chess	2012
Alexander Arutiunian	Music	2001
Yegishe Asatsatryan	Economy / Politics	2004
Charles Aznavour	Music / Diplomacy	2001
Zori Balayan	Publicism / Civic activity	2010
Nerses Bedros XIX	Religion	2012
Jacques Chirac	Politics	2006
Valery Gergiev	Music / Culture	2009
Gohar Gasparyan	Opera / Music	1990
Jivan Gasparyan	Music	2001
Rober Haddeciyan	Journalism / Literature	2011
Ofelya Hambardzumyan	Music	2009
Jon M. Huntsman Sr.	Philanthropy	1998
Iosif Kobzon	Music	2004
Samvel Karapetyan	Business / Charity	2011
Kirk Kerkorian	Business / Philanthropy	2001
Sergey Lavrov	Politics / Diplomacy	2010
Luzhkov, Yuri	Public service	2003
Tigran Mansurian	Music	2017
Ruben Matevosyan	Music	2009
Arthur Meschian	Music / Architecture	2011
Alexey Miller	Business / Energy	2005
Edvard Mirzoyan	Music	2001
Vladimir Movsisyan	Economy / Politics	—
Louise Manoogian Simone	Diaspora / Charity	2001
Frunzik Mkrtchyan	Cinema / Theatre	2000
Svetlana Navasardyan	Music	2010
Saparmurat Niyazov	Politics	2000
Yuri Oganessian	Science / Physics	2019
Konstantin Orbelyan	Music	2003
Ardem Patapoutian	Science / Neurobiology	2022
Arshak Petrosian	Chess	2012
Alla Pugacheva	Music	2009
Ryzhkov, Nikolai	Public service	1998
Eduard Shevardnadze	Politics	1997
Rita Vorperian	Journalist, Writer, Translator, and Researcher	—
Ruben Vardanyan	Business / Charity	2011
Varduhi Varderesyan	Theatre / Cinema	2013
Paul Guiragossian	Artist	—
Richard Hovannisian	historian	—
