= Khaz (notation) =

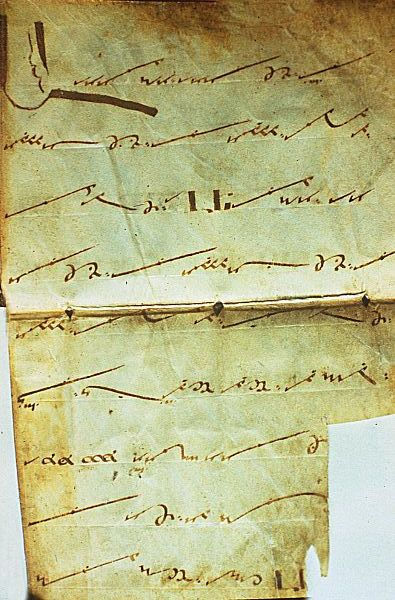
Armenian music manuscript with khaz neumes, 12th century (Matenadaran)

Khaz (Armenian: խազ) is an Armenian neume, one of a set of special signs (plural: khaz or khazes) constituting the traditional system of musical notation that has been used to transcribe religious Armenian music since the 8th century.

During the medieval period, the monasteries of Ark'akaghin, Drazark, Karmir Vank and Skevra became famous centers of manrousoumn, the study of church songs, melodies and the khaz notation.

Examples of khaz signs
