= Shahen =

Shahen is a given name and surname. It may refer to:

== Given name ==
- Shahen (Sassanian general) or Shahin Vahmanzadegan (died ca. 626), senior Sasanian general (spahbed) during the reign of Khosrau II
- Shahen Khachatrian (born 1934), Armenian art expert
- Shahen Meghrian (1952–1993), Armenian military commander and political activist
- Shahen Nikolay Petrosyan (1912–1999), Armenian lawyer, doctor of law, professor in Soviet Armenia

== Surname ==
- Yenovk Shahen (1881–1915), Ottoman Armenian actor and director

== See also ==
- Shahan (disambiguation)
- Shahin (disambiguation), including Shaheen
