= Vache Hovsepyan =

Vache Hovsepyan Վաչե Հովսեփյան
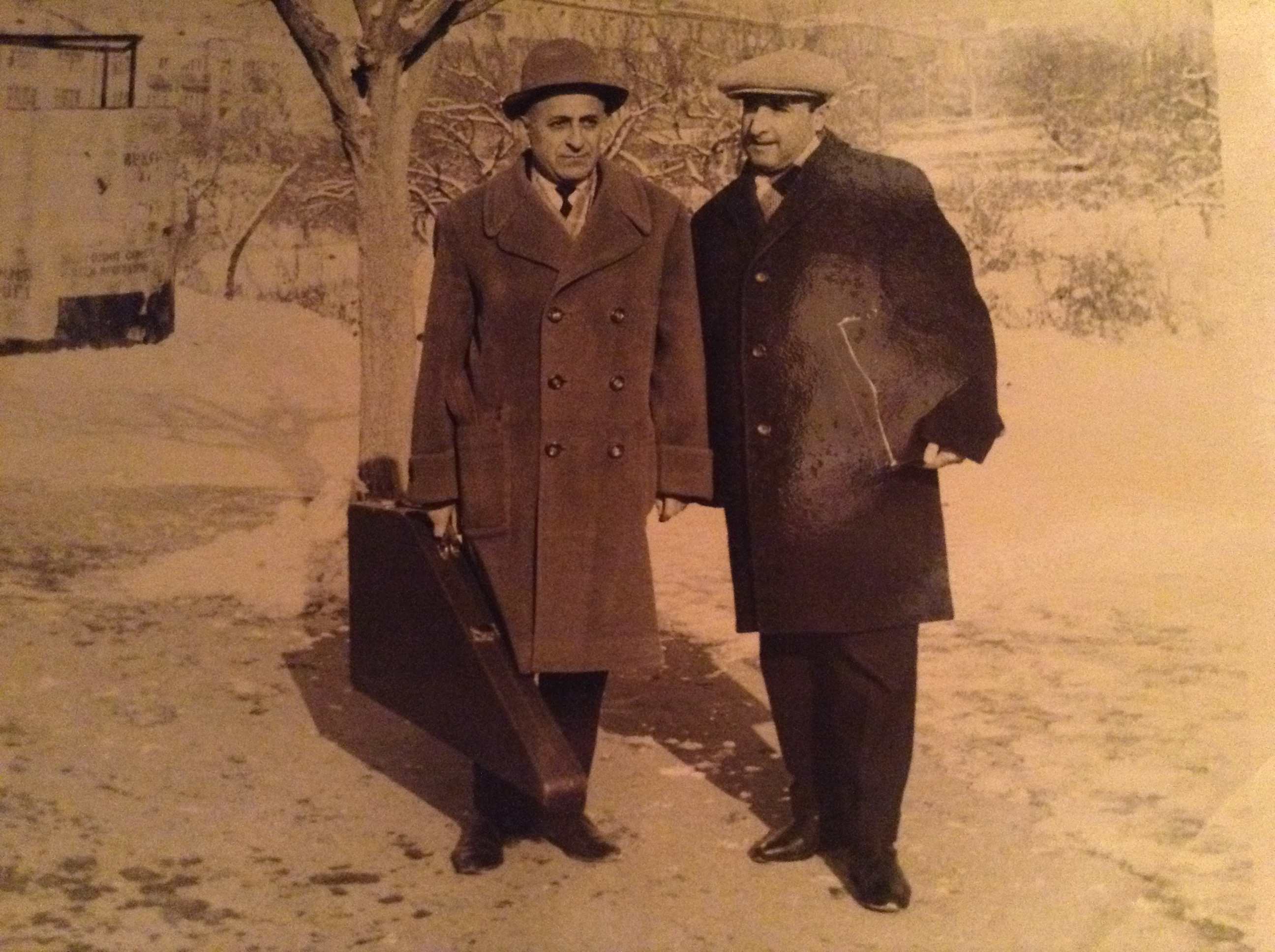
- Hovsepyan with Zaven Termenjyan

Background information
- Born: 17 September 1925; Yerevan, Armenian SSR, Soviet Union
- Died: 1 December 1978 (aged 53); Yerevan, Armenian SSR, Soviet Union
- Genres: Folk
- Occupation: Duduk player
- Instrument: Duduk

Vache Artashesi Hovsepyan (Note: Armenian: Վաչե Արտաշեսի Հովսեփյան, romanized: Vachʻe Artashesi Hovsepʻyan; Russian: Ваче Арташесович Овсепян, romanized: Vache Artashesovich Ovsepyan; Sometimes given as Vatche Hovsepian) (17 September 1925 – 1 December 1978) was an Armenian duduk player and renowned popular artist.

He graduated from the Romanos Melikyan State Music College in 1951. He had started performing as a popular musician on Yerevan radio in 1945 in Armenian popular and folk music. He has composed music for songs like Estonakan Erg (lyrics by Vahan Terian), Iriknazhamin (lyrics by Silva Kaputikyan) and Ereknuk (lyrics by Paruyr Sevak) and others. He also toured in live performances in Armenia, the Soviet Union and worldwide.

With Andranik Askarian, he performed the duduk parts on "The Feeling Begins", the opening track of Peter Gabriel's Passion, the soundtrack album from Martin Scorsese's film The Last Temptation of Christ. The duduk recording is actually an excerpt from a song titled "The Wind Subsides", originally recorded for a collection of Armenian music released by Radio France's Ocora label.
