= Armenian chant =

Liturgical song of Armenian churches

Armenian chant (Armenian: շարական, sharakan) is the melismatic monophonic chant used in the liturgy of the Armenian Apostolic Church and the Armenian Catholic Church.

The Armenian chant, much like the Byzantine chant, is grouped in a system of eight modes called oktoechos. There is no direct parallel between these modes and those of the western tradition. However, they bear a notable similarity to the Byzantine scale otherwise known as the double harmonic scale.

== Early Armenian chant ==
In the 5th century, the earliest Armenian chants were created by St. Mesrop Mashtots who in addition to his compositional work, invented the Armenian alphabet. With the onset of this new alphabet and the subsequent translation of the Bible into Armenian, there was a large incentive to create original Armenian hymns, distinct form those of the Greeks and other neighboring Christians. With the help of Catholicos Isaac, St. Mashtots established an originally authentic Armenian style to be implemented into liturgical music. Both St. Mashtots and Catholicos Partev composed original chants, often drawing inspiration from pre-Christian Armenian melodies. In total, St. Mashtots wrote 129 shara-kanq (canonical hymns) and Catholicos Partev wrote 60: many of which were passed down first by oral tradition and later through written notation. All works were written in classical Armenian called grabar. Today, grabar is reserved only for liturgical usages and is seldom spoken in colloquial settings.

== The Sharaknots ==
The Sharaknots is a vast collection of hymns dedicated for use during Sunday liturgy and prescribed feast days. Although other notable hymn books were used throughout the centuries, including the Gandzaran (the collection of litanies) and the Tagharan (the collection of hymnic odes), none have maintained the same popularity and versatility as the Sharaknots. Efforts to compile the Sharaknots began in the 1300s and concluded in the late 1300s and early 1400s. Few hymns were added to the Sharaknots thereafter with the exception of works composed by Saint Nerses Shnorali which were slowly integrated into the collection beginning in the late 14th century. Today, the Sharaknots contains approximately 1,116 hymns which uniquely incorporate verses from books of the Bible including Prophets, Psalms, and the four Gospels.

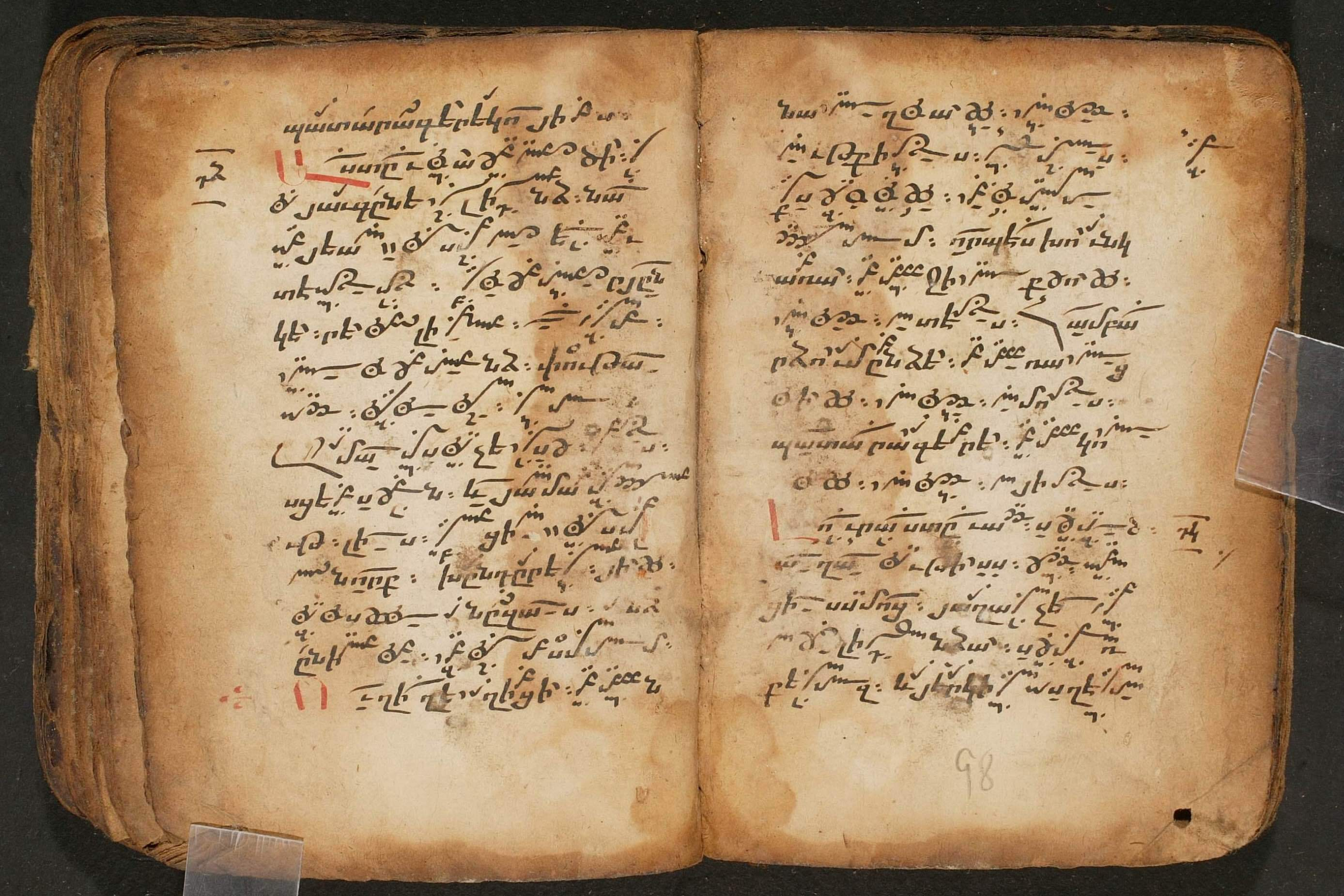
Manuscript of Sharaknots with use of musical notation

Many manuscripts of the Sharknots and other hymnals can be found in museums across the world with the largest collection being found in the Matenadaran Museum of Yerevan Armenia.

== Armenian Neumes: Khaz ==
The earliest surviving Armenian liturgical manuscripts with musical notation date back to the 8th century and contain a system of Armenian neumes called the khaz. This form of notation utilizes an array of symbols and signs written above words to signify changes in pitch. This notation is quite similar to those used in the Byzantine Empire during the same period. Scholars believe this notation was seldom used initially and the majority of musical tradition was passed down orally. However, over time, the khaz became increasingly popular, especially in the Cilician Age. The notation did not remain static and constantly evolved with notable contributions being made by Krikor the deaf during the reign of King Levon II. However, as musical chants became more complex, so too did the khaz. By the 16th and 17th centuries, the khaz became unreadable as newer generations were no longer taught how to read the notation style. As a result, although hundreds of Armenian manuscripts are still preserved, many of them are undecipherable.

In the first half of the 19th century, a new system of notation was introduced by music theorist Hamparsum Limonciyan which bears similarities to the system of notation used in the Greek church at that time. Limonciyan's goal was to develop a notation system that was simple to read but still encapsulated elements of medieval khaz. The "Armenian new notation" consists of 45 symbols and signs which each indicate changes in pitch. Like the old notation, these symbols are placed in between lines of words.

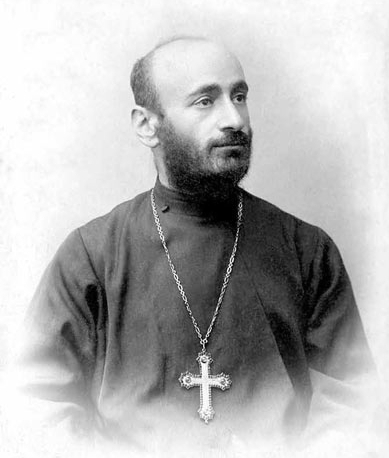
Komitas (Soghomon Soghomonian) in priestly attire

== Contributions by Komitas ==
In the latter half of the 19th century, the Armenian priest and musician Komitas Vartabed, otherwise known as Soghomon Soghomonian, took it upon himself to decipher the Armenian khaz and transcribe it to traditional Western notation. By this time, much of the Armenian liturgy had fused with the styles of Assyria, Greece, Byzantium, Persia, Arabia and Turkey. Komitas studied both the Armenian oral tradition, Armenian manuscripts, and the music of neighboring nations to decipher which parts of contemporary oral tradition were artifacts of foreign influence and which contained historical Armenian melodies. In letters to friends, Komitas describes his motives and his desire to publish a collection of volumes on his findings. In other writings, Komitas discusses in great detail the strategies and methods he employed to decipher the nuemes.

I began my serious experiments in decoding the neumes with the (second) mode [Yerkrord Tzayn], for there, the primary tones remained uncorrupted in both the old and new singing styles. 1) I observed that the tenor [reciting tone] is the most important note in a mode, and neumes assume direction only according to their relation to the tenor in each mode; 2) Each scale degree keeps its position unaltered, and takes its charge from the tenor, making its distinctive moves in accordance with the tenor, the intonation inflects up if it is rising, and down if it is descending

However, Komitas never completed this project due to the onset of the Armenian genocide. Consequently, many of his works were scattered across Europe and many destroyed by the Ottomans. Following the Genocide, Komitas suffered a mental breakdown and was admitted to a hospital in Paris in 1919 where he spent the remainder of his life. However, many of Komitas's works still survive to this day and have been incorporated into the Armenian liturgy.

In the past decade, much work has been done by Artur Shahnazaryan to re-decipher the ancient melodies encoded within the knaz. However, there is still much work left to be accomplished.
