= Armenian opera =

Art of opera in Armenia or opera by Armenian composers

Armenian opera is the art of opera in Armenia or opera by Armenian composers. The founder of the Armenian operatic tradition was Tigran Chukhajian (1837–98), who was born in Constantinople in the Ottoman Empire and received his musical education in Milan, where he became a great admirer of Verdi. He was a political and musical nationalist who mixed Western and Armenian influences in his work. His Arshak II is regarded as the first Armenian opera. It was completed in 1868 but had to wait until 1945 for a full staging, albeit with a new libretto and changes to the score and instrumentation. The libretto, by Tovmas Terzian, is based on the life of the 4th-century king Arshak II. Chukhajian's other operas include Arifi khardakhutyune (The Government Inspector, based on the play by Gogol, 1872); Zemire (1891), which was written in Turkish and premiered in Constantinople; as well as Kyose Kyokhva ("The Balding Elder"), Leblebidji ("The Pea Seller") and Indiana.

The next important composer of Armenian opera was Armen Tigranian (1878–1950) who lived in Russian Armenia and the Armenian Soviet Socialist Republic. He wrote Anoush, set in the Armenian countryside and based on a poem by Hovhannes Tumanyan, in 1912. It was first performed privately in Alexandrapol in 1912, but the first public production occurred in 1935 at the Yerevan Opera Theatre. It made heavy use of folk music, as did Tigranyan's last opera, David Bek (1950). Based on the life of the eponymous national hero and set in the 18th century, it depicts the struggle between Armenians and Safavid Persians. Other leading Armenian opera composers include Alexander Spendiaryan and Haro Stepanian.

== Sources ==
- Grout, Donald (2003). A Short History of Opera (4th ed.). New York: Columbia University Press. ISBN 9780231119580.
- Tahmizian, N. (1976). "Arshak B" «Արշակ Բ». In Simonian, Abel (ed.). Haykakan sovetakan hanragitaran Հայկական սովետական հանրագիտարան [Armenian Soviet Encyclopedia] (in Armenian). Vol. 2. Erevan: Haykakan hanragitarani glkhavor khmbagrutʻyun. pp. 105–106.
