= Khachatur Avetisyan =

Armenian composer

Khachatur Avetisyan (14 April 1926–1996) (Armenian: Խաչատուր Ավետիսյան, Xačatur Avetisyan; alternate transliterations include Avetisian or Avetissian) was an influential Armenian composer, conductor and kanun player.

== Early life and career ==
Khachatur Mekhaki Avetisyan (Armenian: Խաչատուր Մեխակի Ավետիսյան) was born on April 14, 1926, in Leninakan, Armenian SSR (now Gyumri, Armenia). He graduated from the Yerevan State Musical Conservatory where he studied composition under professor Edvard Mirzoyan. At age 25 Avetisyan became the first Armenian composer honored with gold medals in the Berlin and Moscow international competitions. In addition to his studies in classical music, Avetisyan became an authority in Armenian folk music and traditional instruments, especially the kanun. He composed the first Concerto for Kanun and Symphony Orchestra in 1954. Avetisyan dedicated his creative life to researching and developing the performance practice of the Armenian folk music.

Avetisyan founded the folk music department of the Komitas National Conservatory in 1978 where, under his guidance, an entire generation of master instrumentalists was trained. He created numerous famous compositions, ballet, oratorio, film and dance music, as well as a large number of works for various folk instruments. In 1958, he assumed the role of the artistic director of Armenian National Dance Ensemble, and later, the Tatul Altunyan Song and Dance Ensemble, where his new folk instrumental and vocal music became a staple of the performance repertory.

== Personal life ==
Avetisyan married Armenian folk dancer Sona Avetisyan. His son Dr. Mikael Avetisyan is the former conductor of Armenian Philharmonic Orchestra, Yerevan State Symphony Orchestra, and guest conductor with various European orchestras. He is currently the music director of the Armenian Society of Los Angeles Choir.

Khachatur Avetisyan died in 1996, in Yerevan.
