= Gusans =

Ancient Parthian and Armenian performers and storytellers

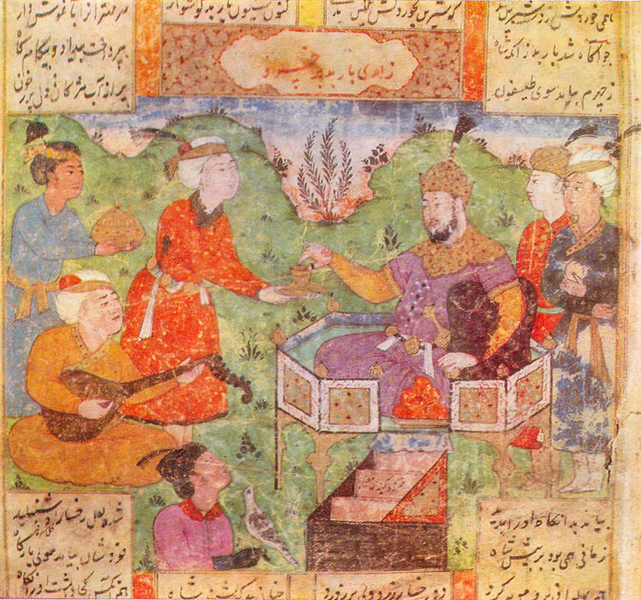
Medieval gusan Barbad playing before Khosrow II

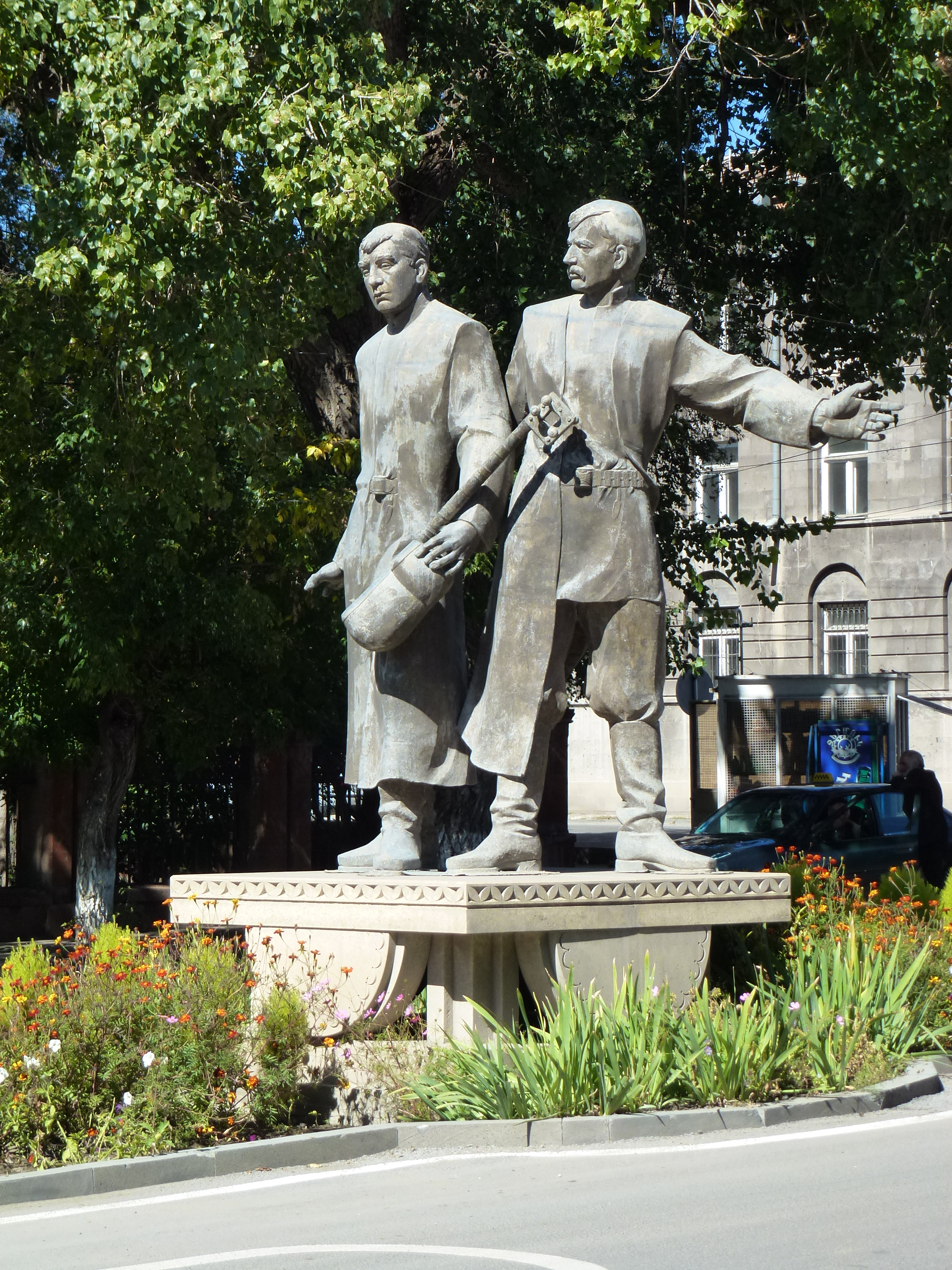
A statue of two gusans in Gyumri, depicting Sheram and Jivani

Gusans (Armenian: գուսան, from Parthian gōsān) were singers, instrumentalists, dancers, storytellers, and professional folk actors in Parthia and ancient and medieval Armenia.

In Armenia, the term gusan is often used as a synonym for ashugh, a later type of singer-poet and bard.

== Etymology ==
The word gusan appears in the earliest Armenian written works, such as the Armenian translation of the Bible (5th century AD). The earliest known use of the word in the Persian language is in the 11th-century poem Vis o Ramin by Fakhruddin As'ad Gurgani. There, it is spelled kūsān and was originally thought to have been a personal name. However, in the 19th century Kerovbe Patkanian identified it as a common word possibly meaning 'musician' and suggested that it was an obsolete Persian term deriving from the same source as Armenian gusan, a loanword. In 1934, Harold W. Bailey identified the word as Parthian in origin. In Hrachia Acharian's opinion, the word was borrowed into Parthian from Armenian govasan 'praiser', then borrowed back into Armenian as gusan. The word is attested in Manichaean Parthian as gwsʾn. Garnik Asatrian suggests that Parthian gōsān derives from earlier *gōβ(a)sān (possibly the source of Armenian govasan), contracted from *gōβ(a)sāhan 'praise-sayer, panegyrist', from Old Iranian *gauba-sāhana-.

== History ==
=== In Armenia ===
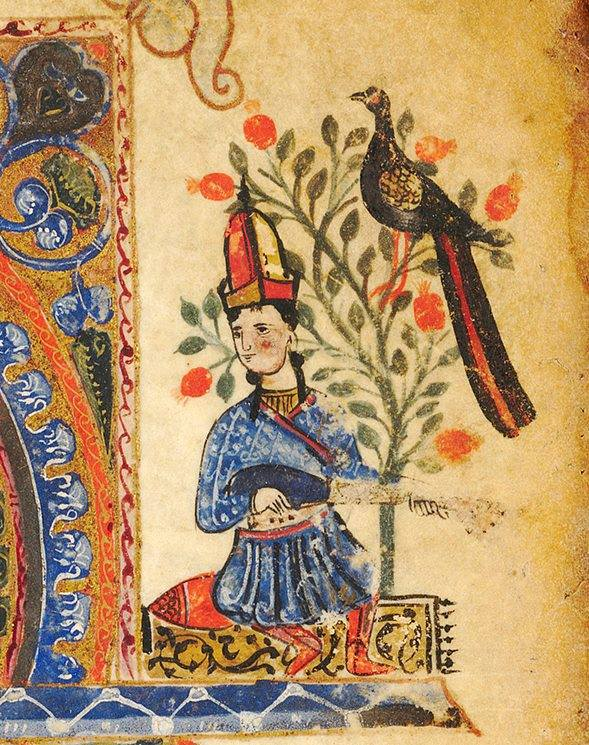
Medieval Armenian gusan in Ani

The origin of Armenian religious and secular songs and their instrumental counterparts takes place in time immemorial. Songs arise from various expressions of Armenian folk art such as rituals, religious practices and mythological performances in the form of music, poetry, dance and theatre. Performers of these forms of expression, gradually honing their skills and developing theoretical aspects, have created a performing tradition. In ancient Armenia, musicians that were referred to as "vipasans”(storytellers) appeared in historical sources as early as the first millennium BC. Vipasans raised the art of secular song and music to a new level. Over time, the vipasans were replaced by "govasans" which later became known as "gusans.” The art of the latter is one of the most important manifestations of medieval Armenian culture, which left indelible traces in the consciousness and spiritual life of people. Gusans, cultivating this particular art form, created monumental works in both lyric and epic genres, thus enriching both national and international cultural heritage (such examples are the heroic epic “David of Sasun” and a series of lyric poems -hairens).

In the early Middle Ages the word gusan was used as an equivalent to the classical Greek word mimos (mime). There were 2 groups of gousans:

1. the first were from aristocratic dynasties (feudal lords) and performed as professional musicians.

2. the second group comprised popular, but illiterate gusans.

Gusans wore long hair, combed up in a cone so that the hairstyle resembled the "tail" of a comet. This hairstyle was supported by a "gisakal" placed under it, which was the prototype of "onkos" - a triangle placed under the wig of ancient tragedians.

The gusans were sometimes criticized and sometimes praised, particularly in medieval Armenia. The adoption of Christianity had its influence upon Armenian minstrelsy, gradually altering its ethical and ideological orientation. This led to the eventual replacement of gusans with ashughs.

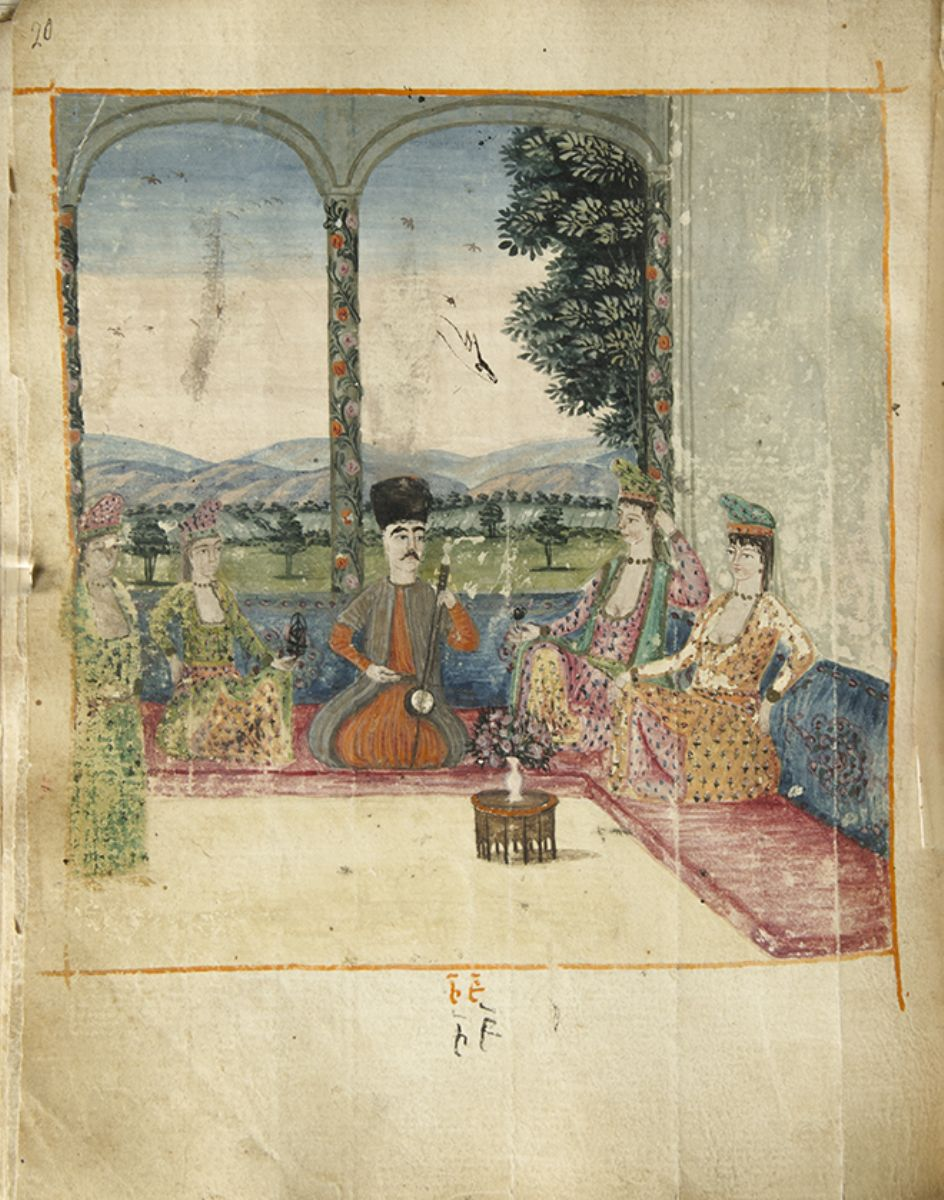
Naghash Hovnatan, Armenian ashugh from Gogtn credited with the shift from Armenian medieval lyric poetry to the new Armenian minstrel school

The center of gusans was Goghtn gavar - a region in the Vaspurakan province of Greater Armenia and bordered with province of Syunik.

=== In Parthia and Sasanian Iran ===
Music and poetry constituted an essential part of Parthian and Armenian culture, serving as an important indicator of belonging in the secular society of ancient Armenia and Parthia. It is not known from ancient sources how the Parthian and Armenian gusans were trained, but the predominance of hereditary transmission of professions in Ancient Armenia and Iran made it possible for transmission from family education and the transfer of knowledge from fathers to children. Historians believe that each feudal clan had its own clan minstrel gosans who knew the history and traditions of the clan and glorified them in their works.

The Gosans enjoyed great privileges and authority in ancient Armenian and Iranian society. According to medieval Armenian and Iranian sources, not a single significant event could go without them. Gusan art reached a focal point of development during the Sasanian Empire. One of the most famous gusans (minstrel poets) of the Sasanian era was Barbad.

Parthian influence has left clear traces in some aspects of Armenian culture. Thus, the gusans mentioned by Armenian authors could be a replica of the Parthian gusans. Mary Boyce believes that the Parthian cultural influence was so strong in the region, and in particular in Armenia, that it is likely that the Parthian gusans influenced not only the name but also, the Armenian art form.

== See also ==
- Ashik
- Bard
- Bhāts
- Dziady (wandering beggars)
- Filí
- Griot
- Lirnyk
- Minstrels
- Skald
- Trouvère
- Troubadour

== General references ==
- Syuni, Grigor (2005). Hay erazhshtutʻiwn Հայ երաժշտութիւն [Armenian Music] (in Armenian and English). Translated by Toumajan, Anahit; Toumajan, Dickran. Yerevan: Grakanutʻean ew aruesti tʻangarani hratarakchʻutʻiwn. ISBN 9789993060598.
