= Sayat-Nova =

Armenian poet

Sayat-Nova Սայաթ-Նովա
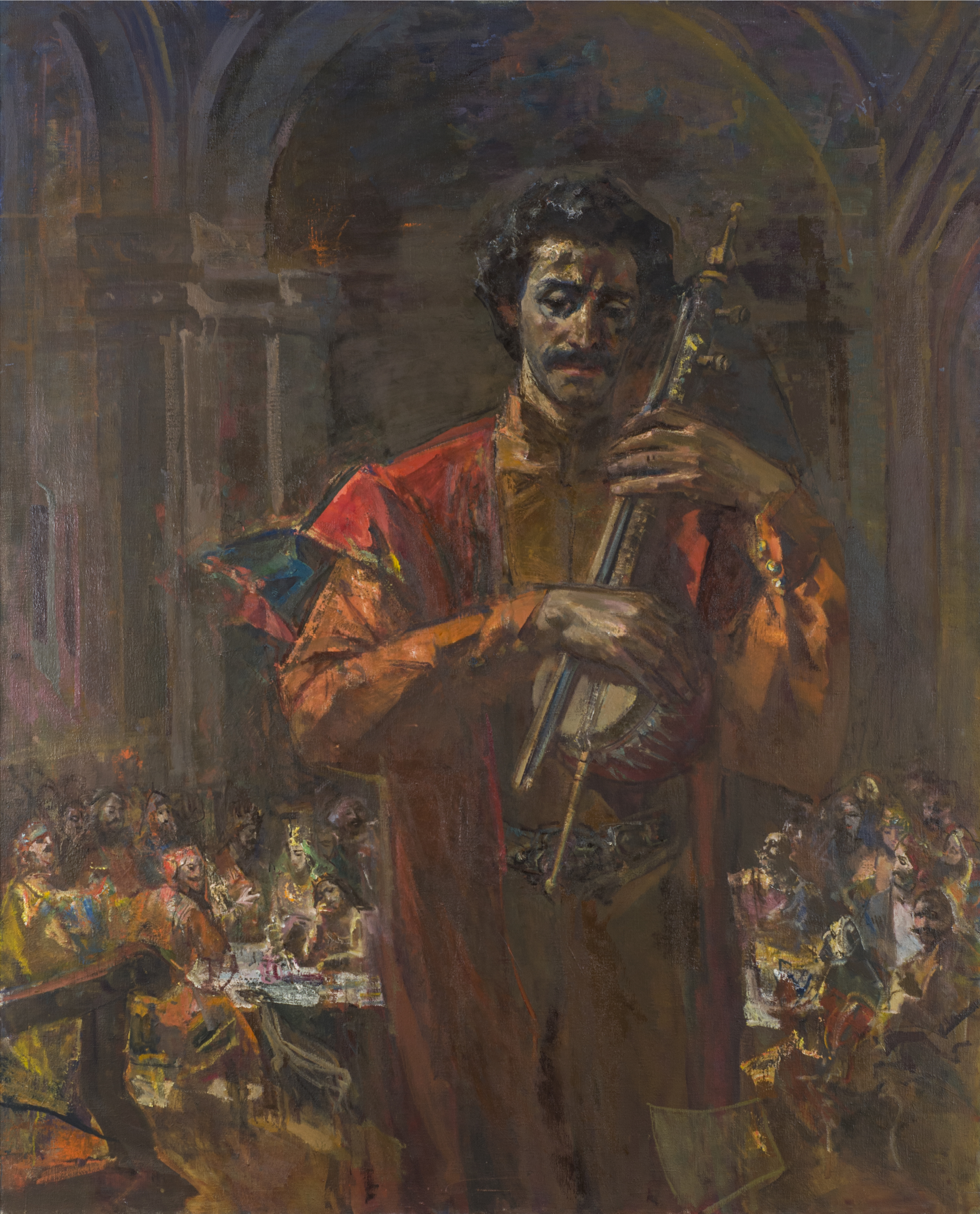
- Oil on canvas portrait of Sayat-Nova by Eduard Isabekyan (1964).
- Born: Harutyun Sayatyan; 14 June 1712; Tiflis, Kingdom of Kartli, Safavid Iran (present-day Georgia)
- Died: 22 September 1795 (aged 83); Haghpat, Kingdom of Kartli-Kakheti, Qajar Iran (present-day Armenia)
- Occupations: Poet, musician, ashugh
- Spouse: Marmar Shahverdian

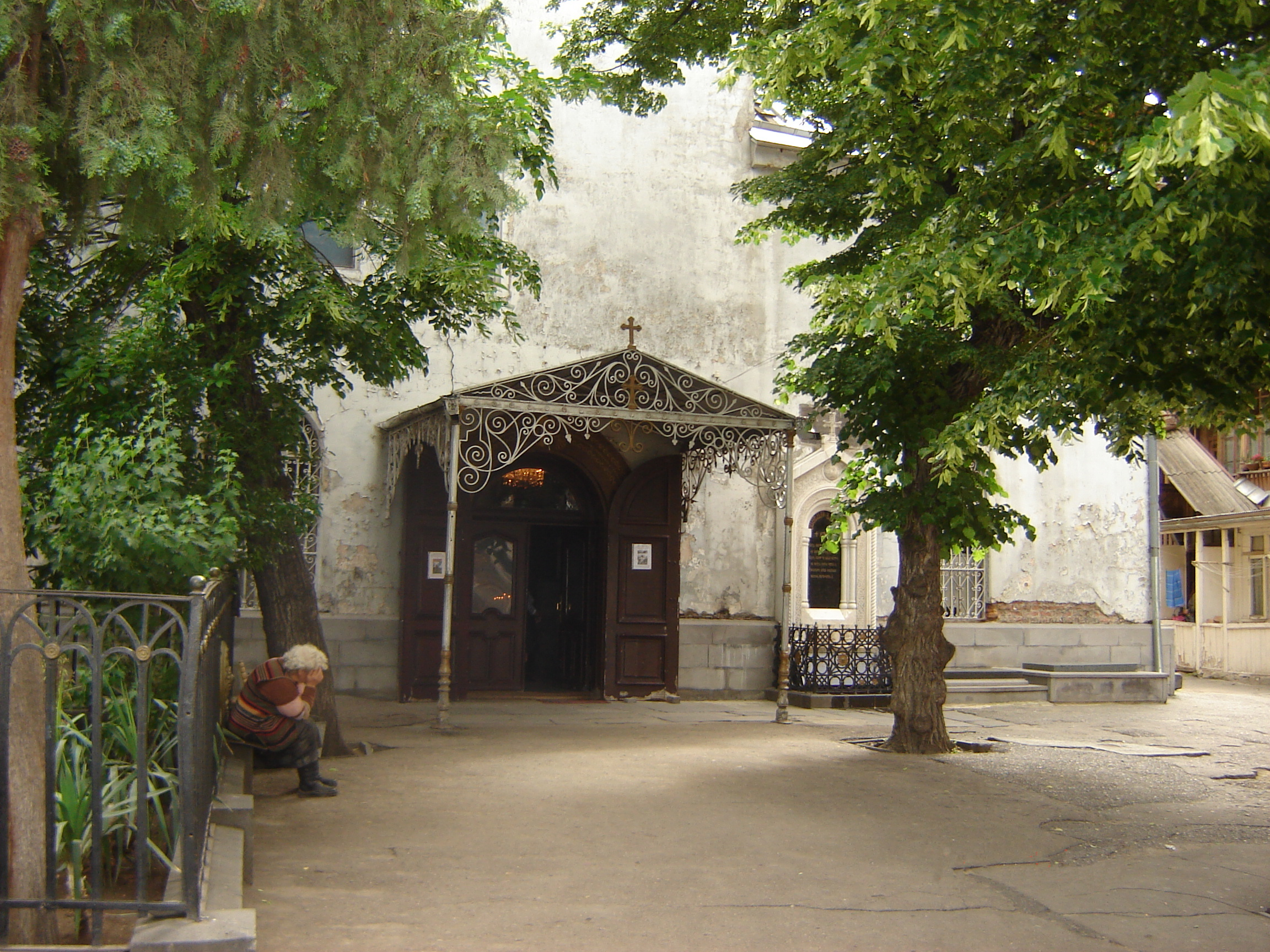
The tomb of Sayat Nova at the Cathedral of Saint George in Old Tbilisi

Sayat-Nova, (Note: Armenian: Սայեաթ-Նովայ (сlassical), Սայաթ-Նովա (reformed); Georgian: საიათნოვა; Azerbaijani/Persian: سایات‌نووا) born Harutyun Sayatyan (Armenian: Հարություն Սայաթյան); 14 June 1712 – 22 September 1795) was an Armenian poet, musician and ashugh, who had compositions in a number of languages.

== Name ==
The name Sayat-Nova has been given several interpretations. One version reads the name as "Lord of Song" (from Arabic sayyid and Persian nava) or "King of Songs". Others read the name as grandson (Persian neve) of Sayad or hunter (sayyad) of song.

Charles Dowsett considers all these derivations to be unlikely and proposes the reading New Time (from Arabic sa'at and Russian nova) instead.

== Biography ==
Sayat-Nova's mother, Sara, was born in Tiflis, and his father, Karapet, either in Aleppo or Adana. He was born in Tiflis. Sayat-Nova was skilled in writing poetry, singing, and playing the kamancheh, Chonguri and Tambur.

In 1759, Sayat-Nova lost his social position at the royal court of Heraclius II, possibly because he fell in love with Heraclius's sister, Ana. He spent the rest of his life as an itinerant bard.

Soon after, he was ordained as a priest in the Armenian Apostolic Church. His wife, Marmar, died in 1768, leaving behind four children. He served in locations including Tiflis and Haghpat Monastery.

In 1795, he was killed in Haghpat Monastery by the invading army of Agha Mohammad Khan Qajar, Shah of Persia. He demanded that Sayat-Nova convert from Christianity to Islam. He refused, declaring that his religion was undeniably Armenian Christian. Hence he was promptly executed by beheading. He is buried at the Armenian Cathedral of Saint George in Tbilisi.

== Legacy ==
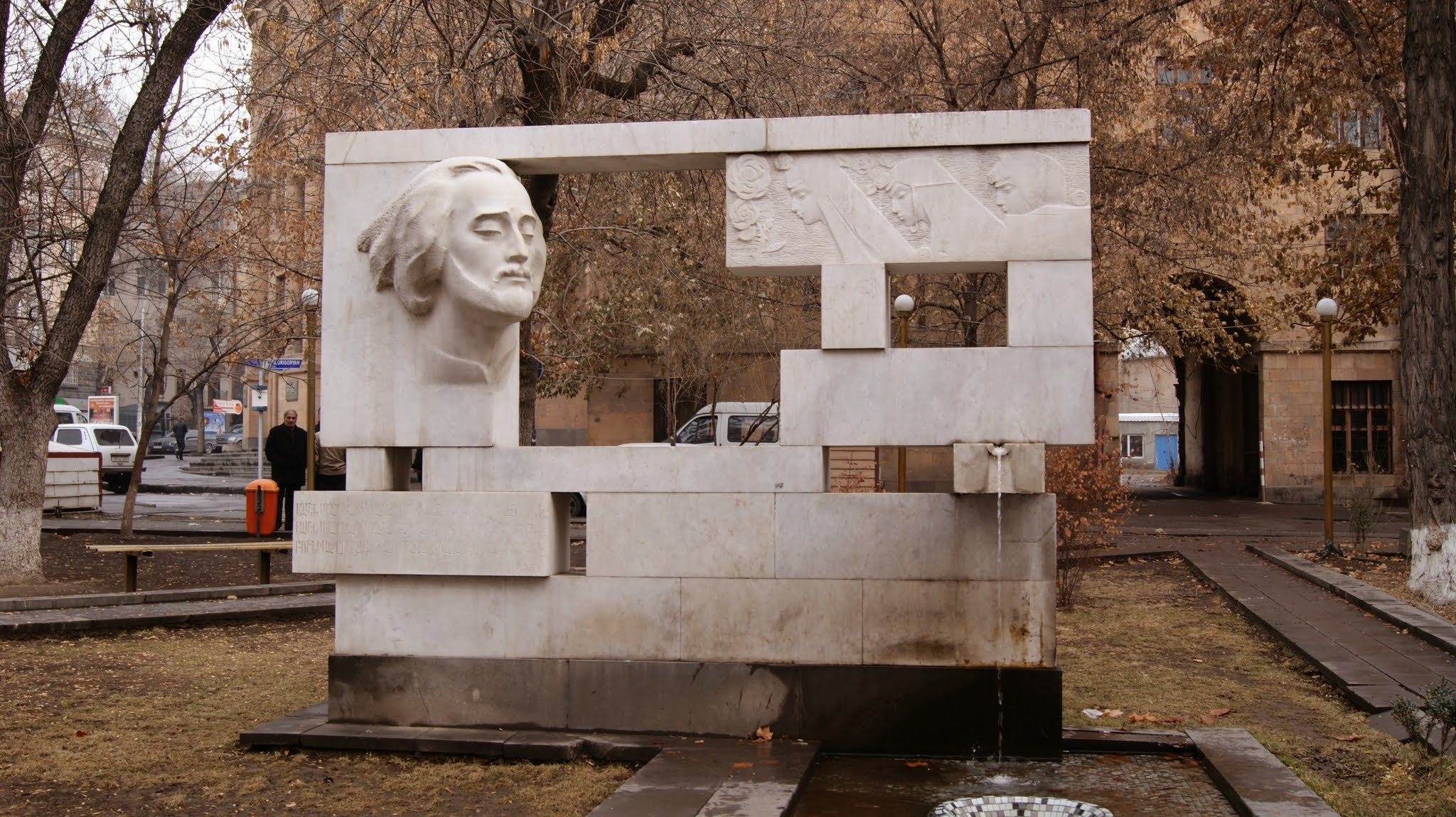
Monument of Sayat Nova in Yerevan

In Armenia, Sayat-Nova is considered a great poet who made a considerable contribution to the Armenian poetry and music of his century. Although he lived his entire life in a deeply religious society, his works are mostly secular and full of romantic expressionism.

About 220 songs have been attributed to Sayat-Nova, although he may have written thousands more. Sayat-Nova also wrote some poems moving between all three.

== In popular culture ==
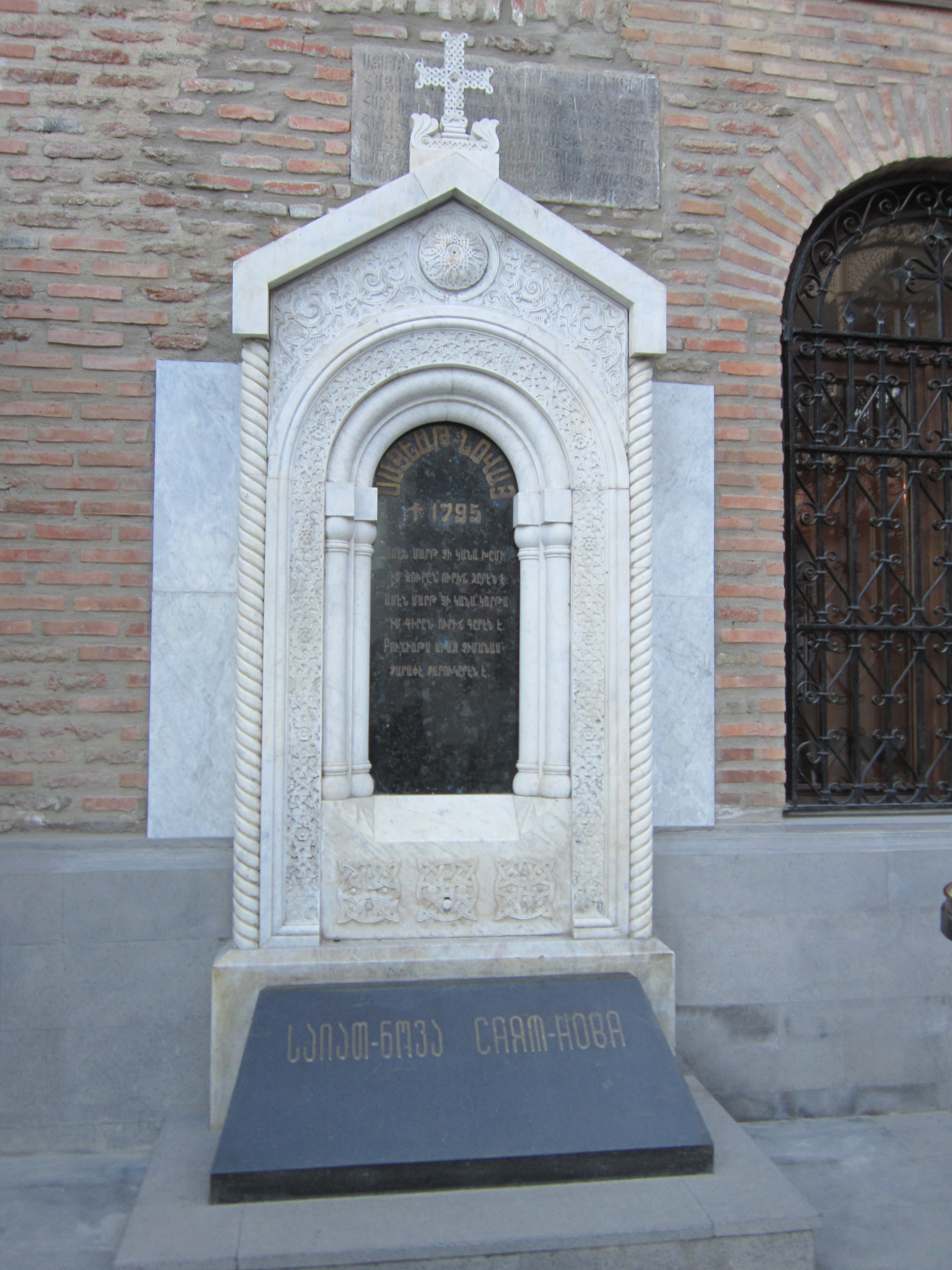
The tombstone of Sayat-Nova

- Sayat Nova Dance Company of Boston is named after him.
- The 1969 Armenian film Sayat Nova directed by Sergei Parajanov follows the poet's path from his childhood wool-dyeing days to his role as a courtier and finally his life as a monk. It was released in the United States under the title The Color of Pomegranates. It is not a biography of Sayat Nova, but a series of tableaux vivants of Armenian costume, embroidery and religious rituals depicting scenes and verses from the poet's life.
- A book on his life and work by Charles Dowsett was published in 1997 titled Sayat'-nova: An 18th-century Troubadour: a Biographical and Literary Study.
- The first translations of the Armenian odes of Sayat Nova in European languages were in Russia by Valery Bryusov in 1916, in Georgia by Ioseb Grishashvili in 1918, in Poland by Leopold Lewin in 1961 and in France by Elisabeth Mouradian and the French poet Serge Venturini in 2006; the book was dedicated to Sergei Parajanov.
- There is a street and a music school named after him in Yerevan, Armenia; an Armenian-American dance ensemble in the United States; and a pond in Mont Orford, Quebec, Canada.
- A brand of Armenian Cognac is named after him.
- An Armenian restaurant opened in Chicago's Streeterville neighborhood in 1970 is named after him.
- In 2020, a perfume created by Dmitry Bortnikoff and Rajesh Balkrishnan was named after him.
- The piano piece "Elegy in Memory of Aram Khachaturian" by Arno Babajanian is based on a melody by Sayat-Nova.

== Gallery ==
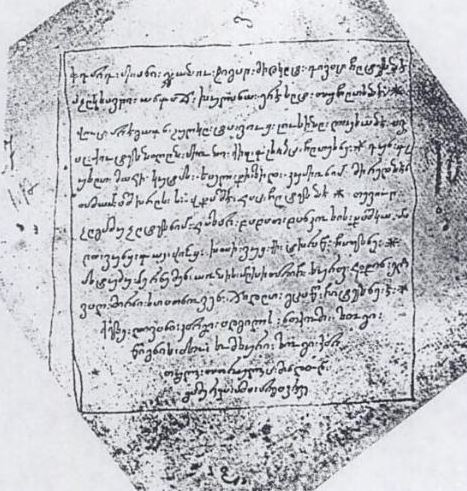
An Armenian-Georgian poem written by Sayat-Nova using mix of Armenian and Georgian alphabets.

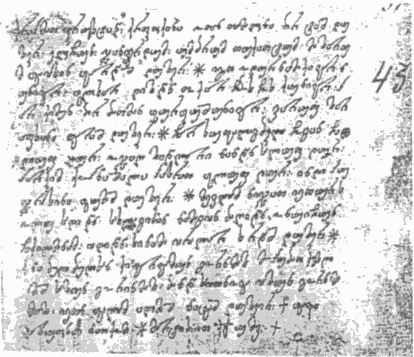
A poem written in Azeri using Georgian letters.

== Sources ==
- Charles Dowsett, (1997), Sayatʻ-Nova: an 18th-century troubadour: a biographical and literary study, ISBN 90-6831-795-4
- Nikoghos Tahmizian, Sayat Nova and the Music of Armenian Troubadours and Minstrels, (in Armenian), 1995, Drazark Press, Pasadena, Ca.
