= Sheram =

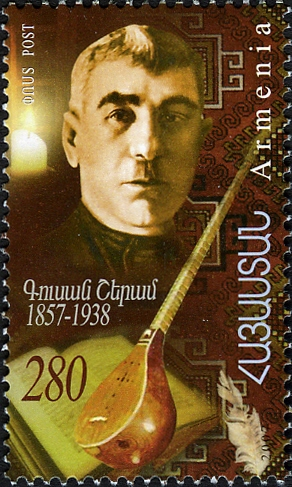
Sheram on a 2007 Armenian stamp

Sheram (Armenian: Շերամ, lit. 'silkworm', born Grigor Talian; 20 March 1857 – 7 March 1938) was an Armenian composer and bard (ashugh or gusan). A native of Alexandropol (Gyumri), the center of the Armenian ashughs, he received no education and was a self-taught musician. He was one of several Armenian folk musicians who introduced simpler and lighter forms of music and lyrics. Many of his songs remain popular to this day.

== Biography ==
Sheram, whose birth name was Grigor Talian, (Note: Armenian: Տալյան, romanized: Talyan, classical orthography: Տալեան. Also rendered Տալիեանց, Talieants’ in his lifetime.) was born in Alexandropol (modern-day Gyumri, Armenia, then part of the Russian Empire) on 20 March 1857. In the 19th century, Alexandropol was the center of the Armenian bard community, known as ashughs or gusans. His grandfather, Kyamali, was also an ashugh. Grigor's father died when he was ten years old, after which he was apprenticed to various craftsmen. He made his own saz and tar and taught himself how to play. He began composing songs at the age of twelve or thirteen. He joined the itinerant trio of the kamancha player Chungur Hago, traveling to Erivan (Yerevan), Tiflis (Tbilisi), Baku, Astrakhan, Shusha, Kars and other cities where Armenians lived. He also started his own music group.

Talian's first song was "Partizum varder bats’vats" (The roses blossom in the garden), which was published in the collection Tagher u khagher compiled by A. Mkhitariants in 1900. In 1902, a collection of his songs titled Yergich Grigor Talyani k’narë (The lyre of singer Grigor Talian). The booklet Gangati shant’er, containing his songs on national and patriotic themes (such as "Andranikin" [To Andranik] and "P’ut’ank’ ar’aj" [Let's rush forward]), was published in 1905. Also in 1905, Talian's band played in Etchmiadzin, where the musicologist Komitas notated his song "Al u alvan es hagel" (You're dressed in scarlet and motley colors). In 1914, the Armenian poet Hovhannes Hovhannisyan dubbed him Sheram, literally 'silkworm', as in 'a composer of silk-like, fine songs'. Another collection of Sheram's songs titled Anzusp arshav (Unrestrained campaign), containing songs such as "Anetsk’ Vilhelmin" (A curse on Wilhelm), "Andraniki koch’ë" (Andranik's call), and "Linenk’ yeghbayrner" (Let's be brothers), was published in 1915. Sheram settled in Tiflis in 1915 and resided there until 1935. Some of his famous songs from this period of his career are "Sarer kaghach’em" (I beg you, mountains), "Na mi naz uni" (She is graceful), "K’ezanits’ mas ch’unim" (I have no part of you), "Eli yerkins ampel" (My sky is cloudy again). Some of his most popular love songs are "Partezum varder bats’vats", "Sirunner" (Beauties), "Shorora" (Amble), "Dun im musan es" (You are my muse), "Annman p’eri" (Inimitable fairy), and "T’ar’ë doshis" (Tar to my chest). He moved to Yerevan in 1935 and died there on 7 March 1938.

Sheram lived and worked in a time when Armenian bard-craft was experiencing a revival which, according to S. Grigorian and M. Manukian, abandoned complex forms and measures while maintaining the rich traditions of the art. He and his contemporaries preferred simpler and lighter forms, held to be closer to authentic folk prosody and thinking. Grigorian and Manukian write that Sheram "turned to the true foundations of Armenian folk music, whether that of the cities or villages, more boldly than his predecessors and contemporaries, further developing the melodiousness of lyrics and the colorfulness and emotionality of melodies." The notes to the melodies of Sheram's songs were published in 1959 in the volume Yerger.

== See also ==
- Jivani, another famous Armenian ashugh and contemporary of Sheram
