= Culture of Armenia =

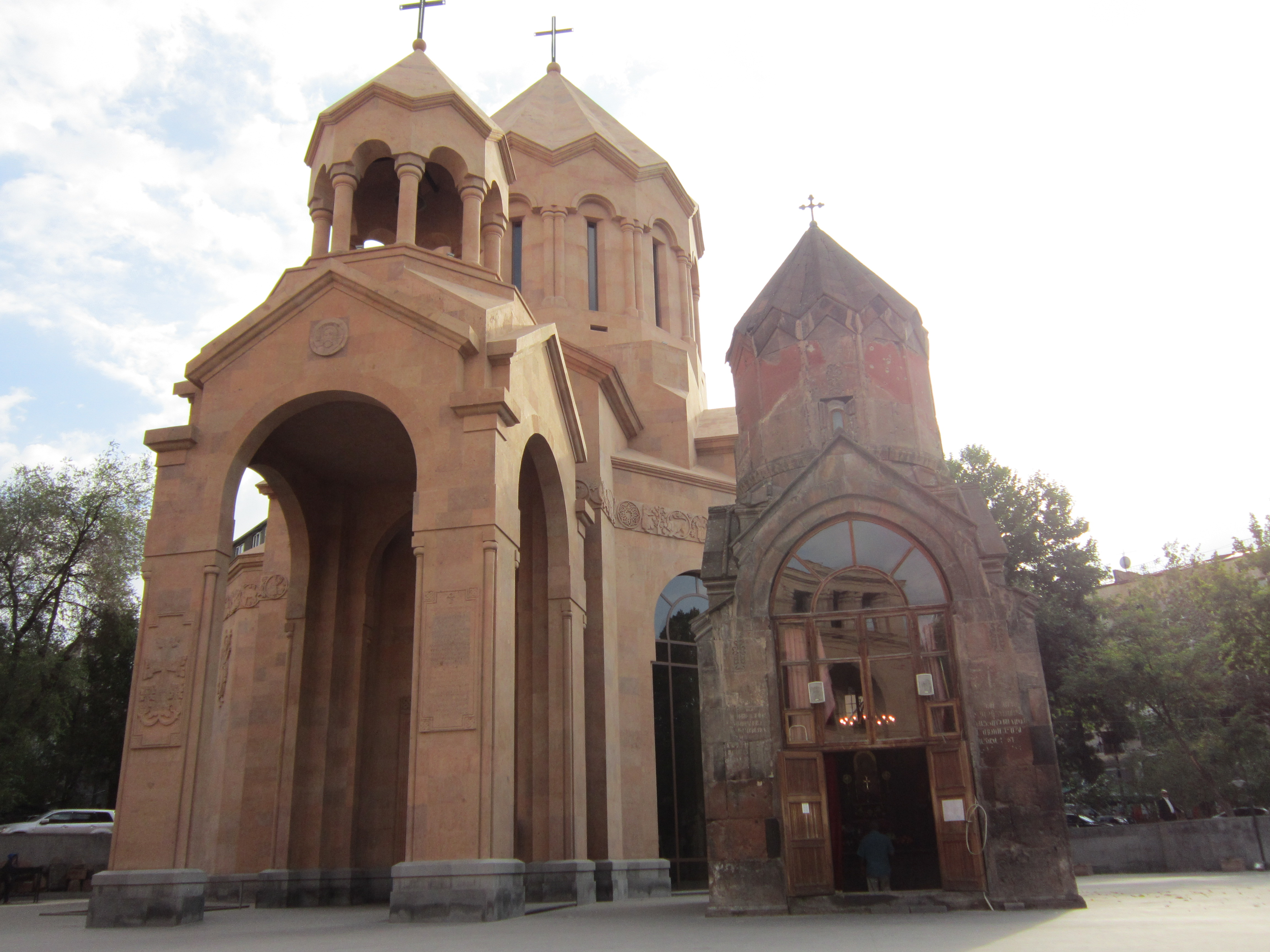
Katoghike Holy Mother of God Church in Yerevan

The culture of Armenia encompasses many elements that are based on the geography, literature, architecture, dance, and music of the Armenian people. Armenia is a majority Christian country in the Caucasus.

== Creative arts ==
=== Literature ===
Armenian literature began in 405 A.D. when Mesrop Mashtots created the Armenian alphabet, according to tradition, probably basing it on the Pahlavi and Greek alphabets. Movses Khorenatsi (Moses of Khorene) was a prominent Armenian writer of the 5th century and the author of the History of the Armenians.

Modern writers include the Russian-Armenian author, poet, and philosopher Mikael Nalbandian, who worked to create a new Armenian literary identity in the 19th century.

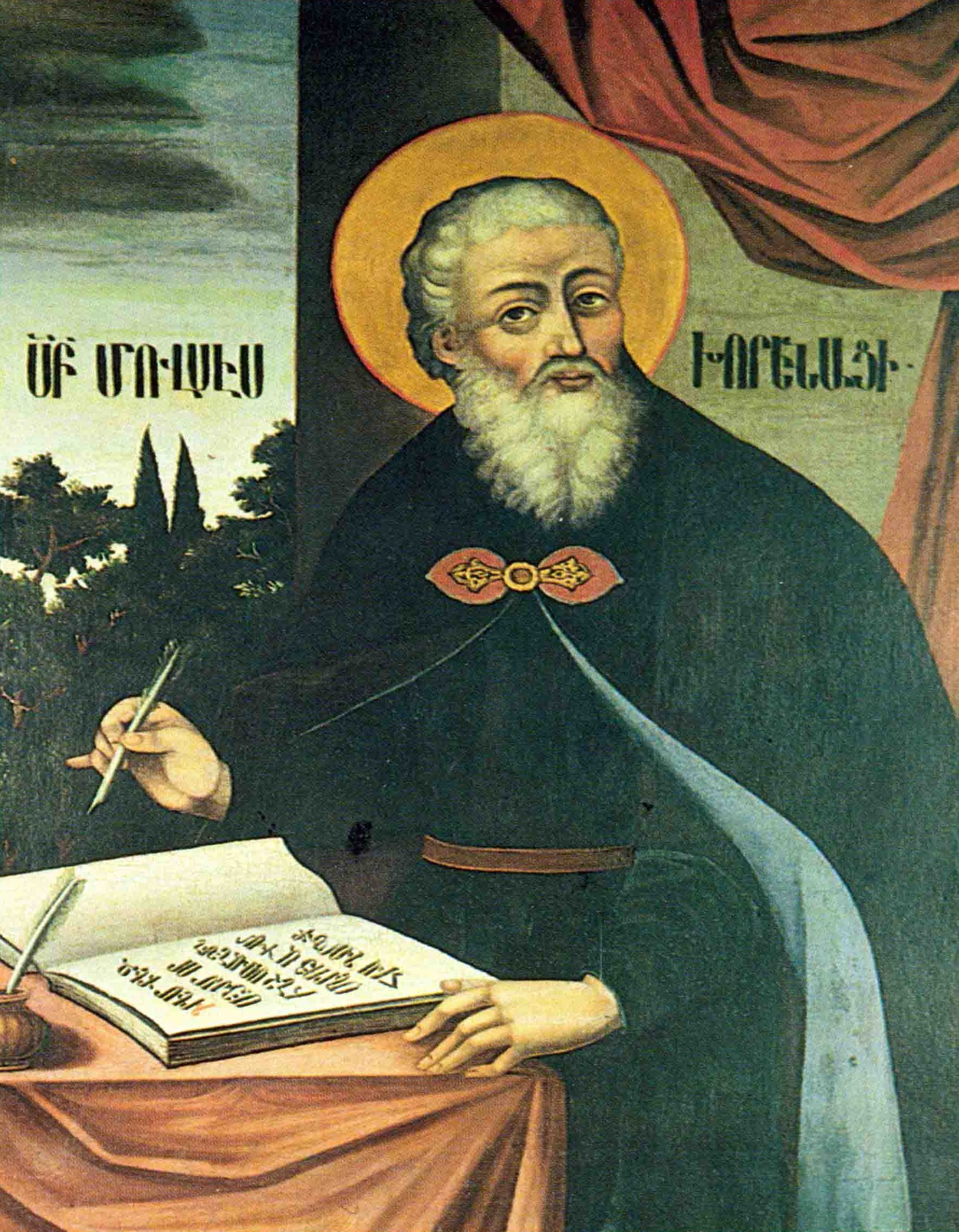
Movses Khorenatsi

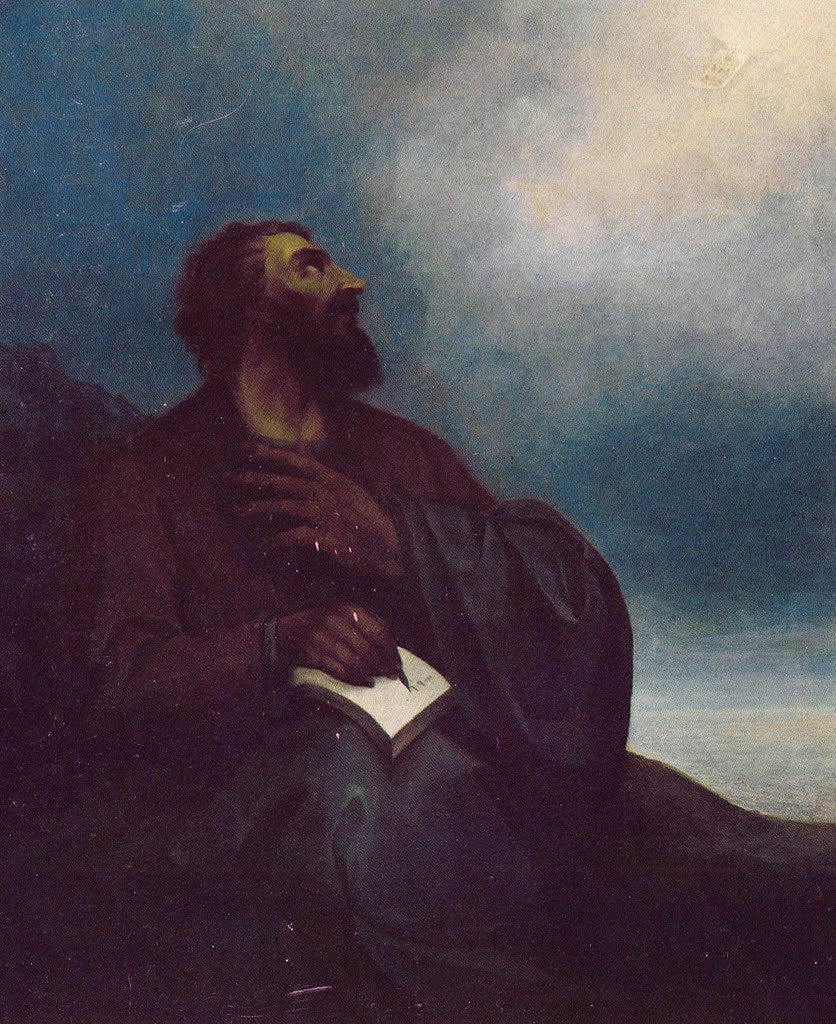
Mesrop Mashtots (19th century painting)

=== Dance ===
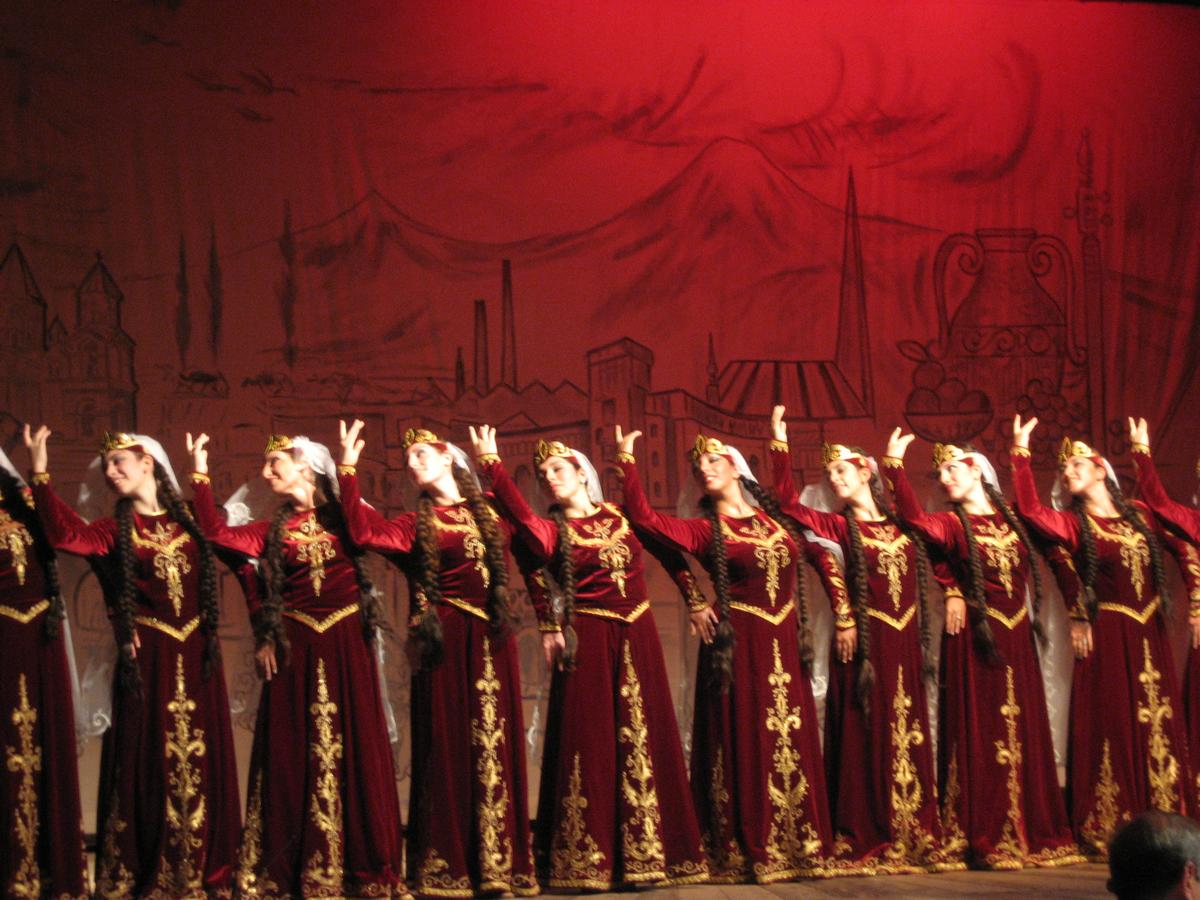
Traditional Armenian Dance

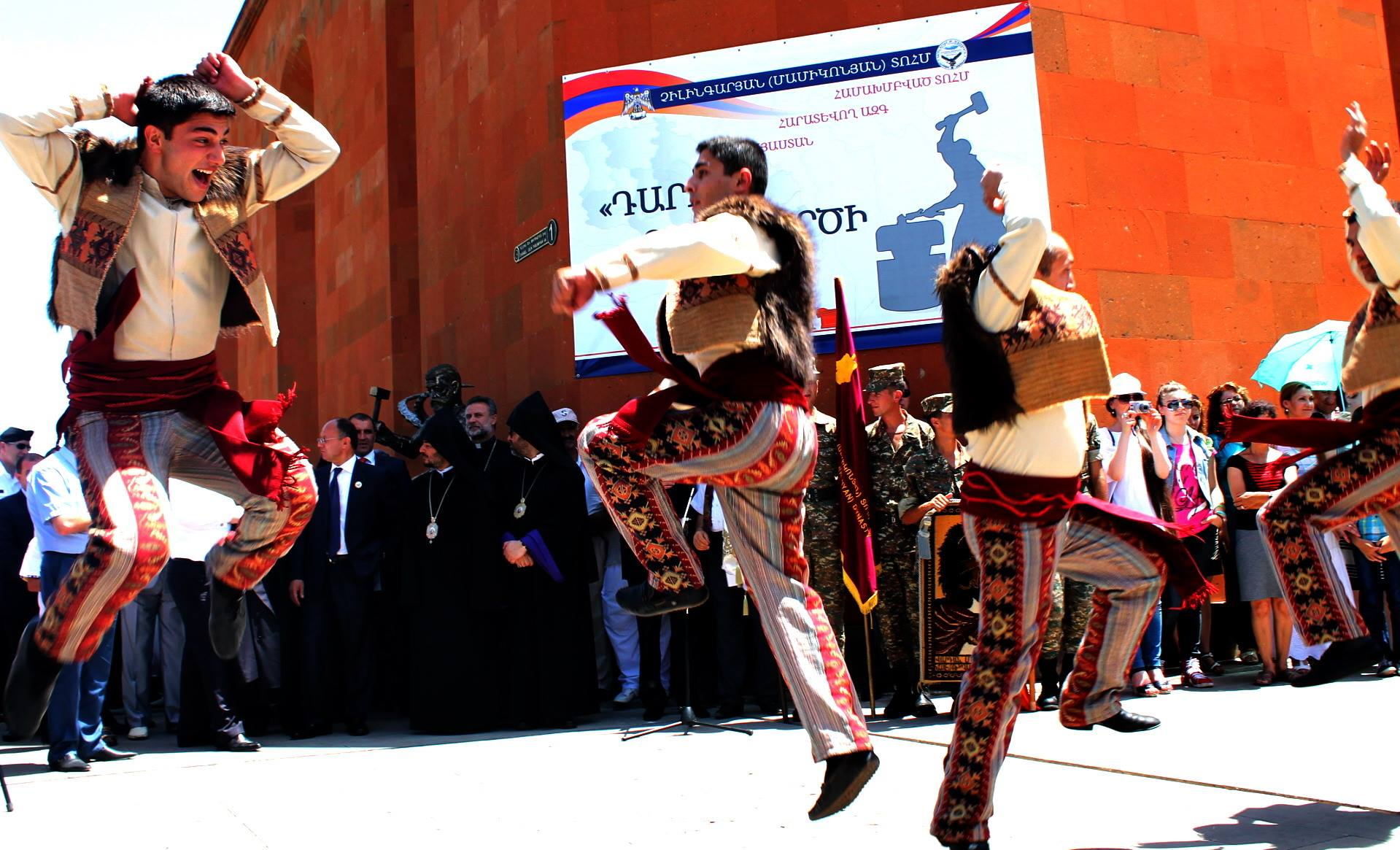
Yarkhushta performed by Karin folk dance troupe from Yerevan.

From the fifth to the third millennia B.C., in the higher regions of Armenia there are rock paintings of scenes of country dancing.

The energetic Armenian Yarkhushta is a martial dance mentioned in the medieval works of Movses Khorenatsi, Faustus of Byzantium, and Grigor Magistros. It has traditionally been danced by Armenian soldiers before combat engagements, partly for ritualistic purposes, and partly in order to cast off fear and boost battle spirit.

The dance is performed by men, who face each other in pairs. The key element of the dance is a forward movement when participants rapidly approach one another and vigorously clap onto the palms of hands of dancers in the opposite row.

=== Architecture ===
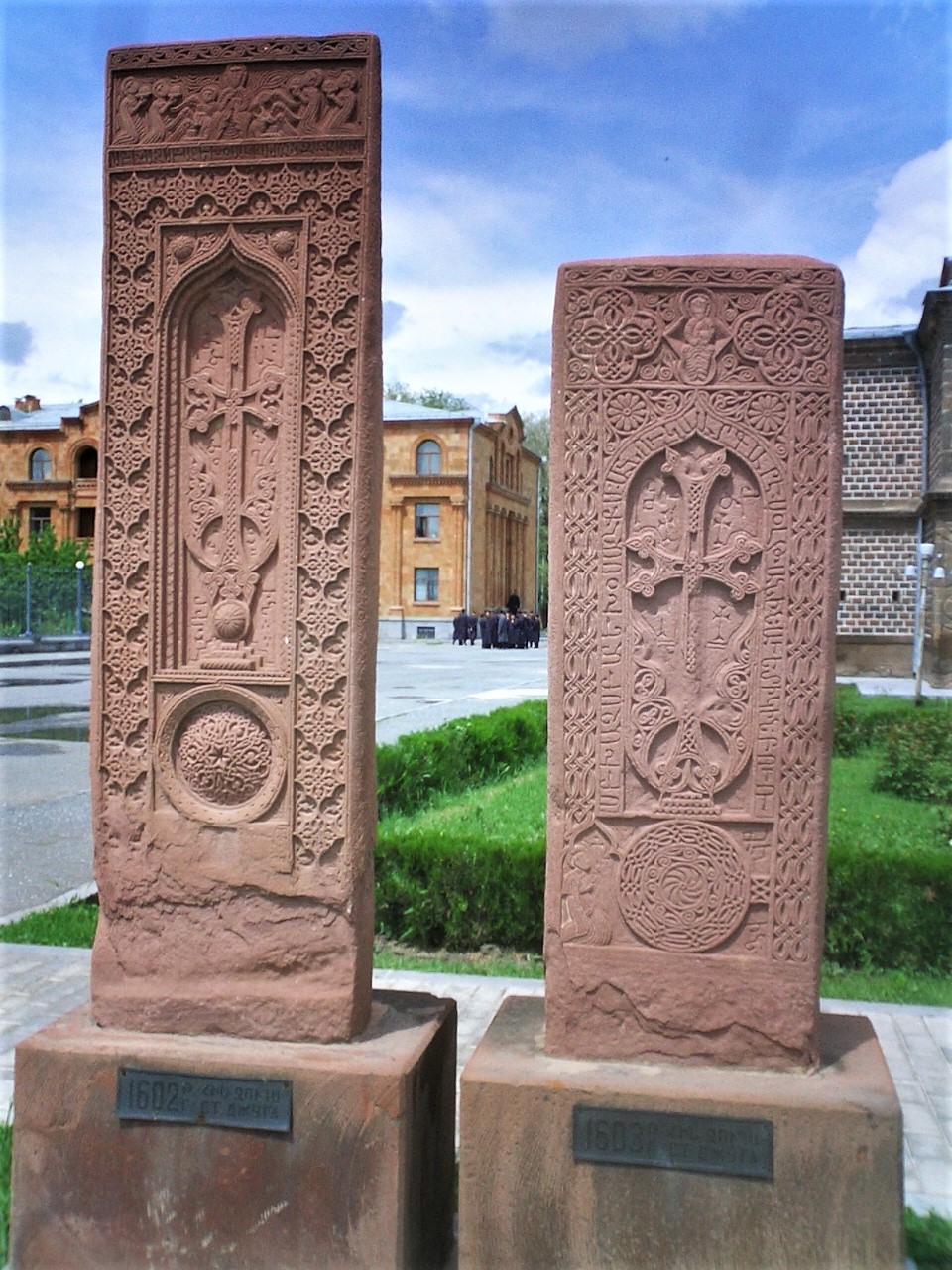
Two 16th-century khachkars ("cross-stones") from the Julfa cemetery, now at Etchmiadzin

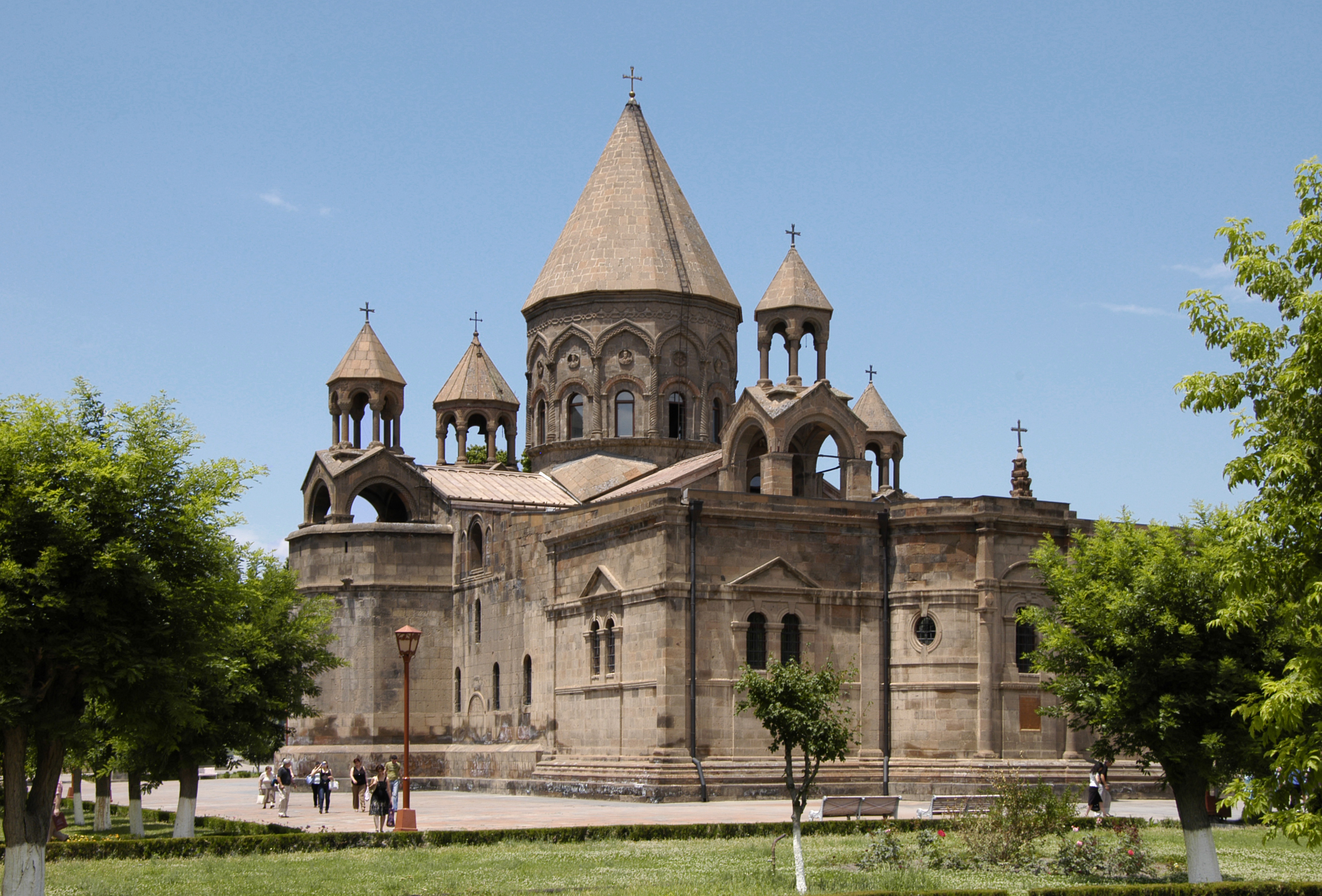
Etchmiadzin Cathedral, regarded as one of the oldest cathedrals in the world (traditionally, between 301 and 303 CE).

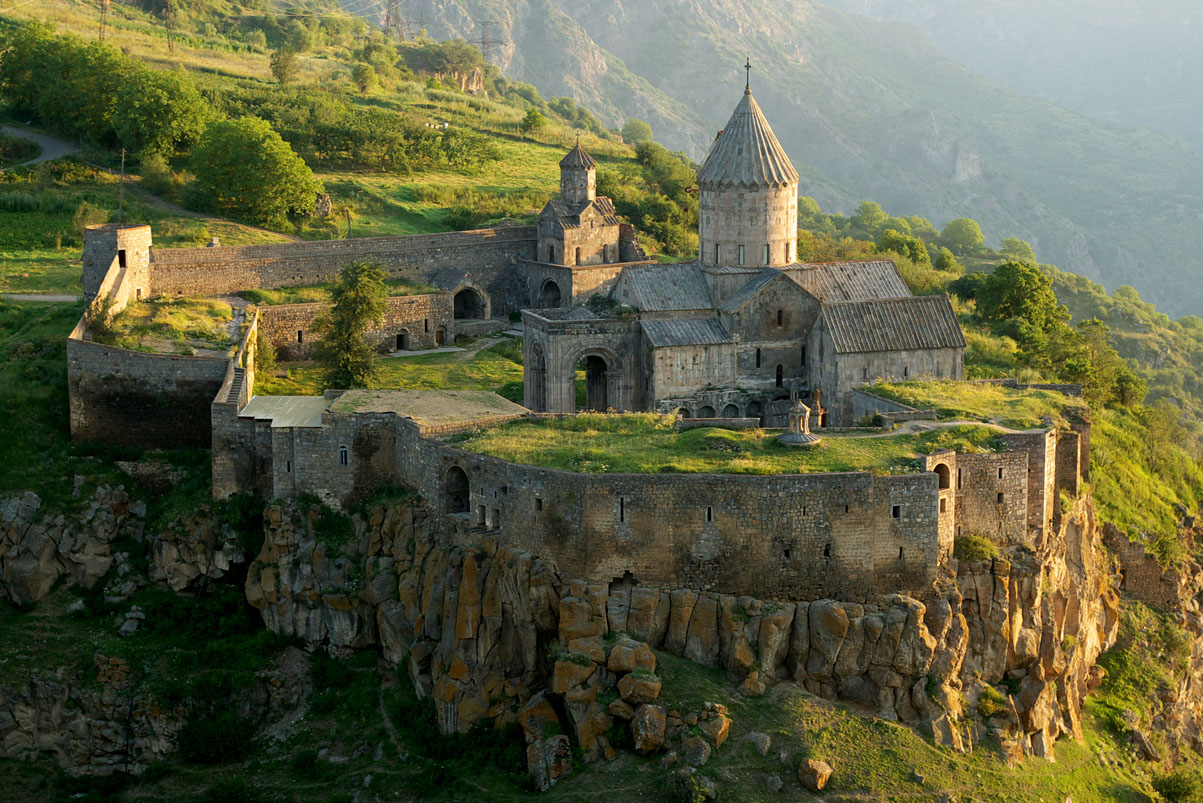
The Armenian Tatev Monastery

Classical Armenian architecture is divided into four separate periods. The first Armenian churches were built between the 4th and 7th centuries, beginning when the Armenian monarchy converted to Christianity and ending with the Arab invasion of Armenia. The early churches were mostly simple basilicas, some with side apses. By the 5th century the typical cupola cone in the center had become widely used. By the 7th century, centrally-planned churches were built with a more complicated niched buttress and radiating Hripsime style. By the time of the Arab invasion most of classical Armenian architecture had formed.

=== Carpets ===
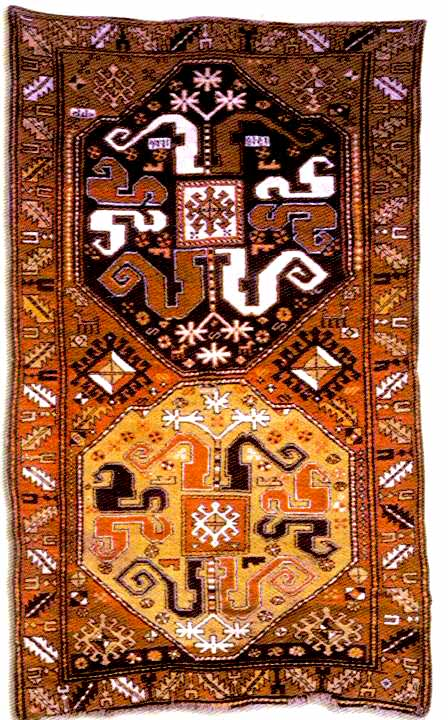
Armenian vishapagorg (dragon-carpet) style Artsakh carpet from Shushi, 1813

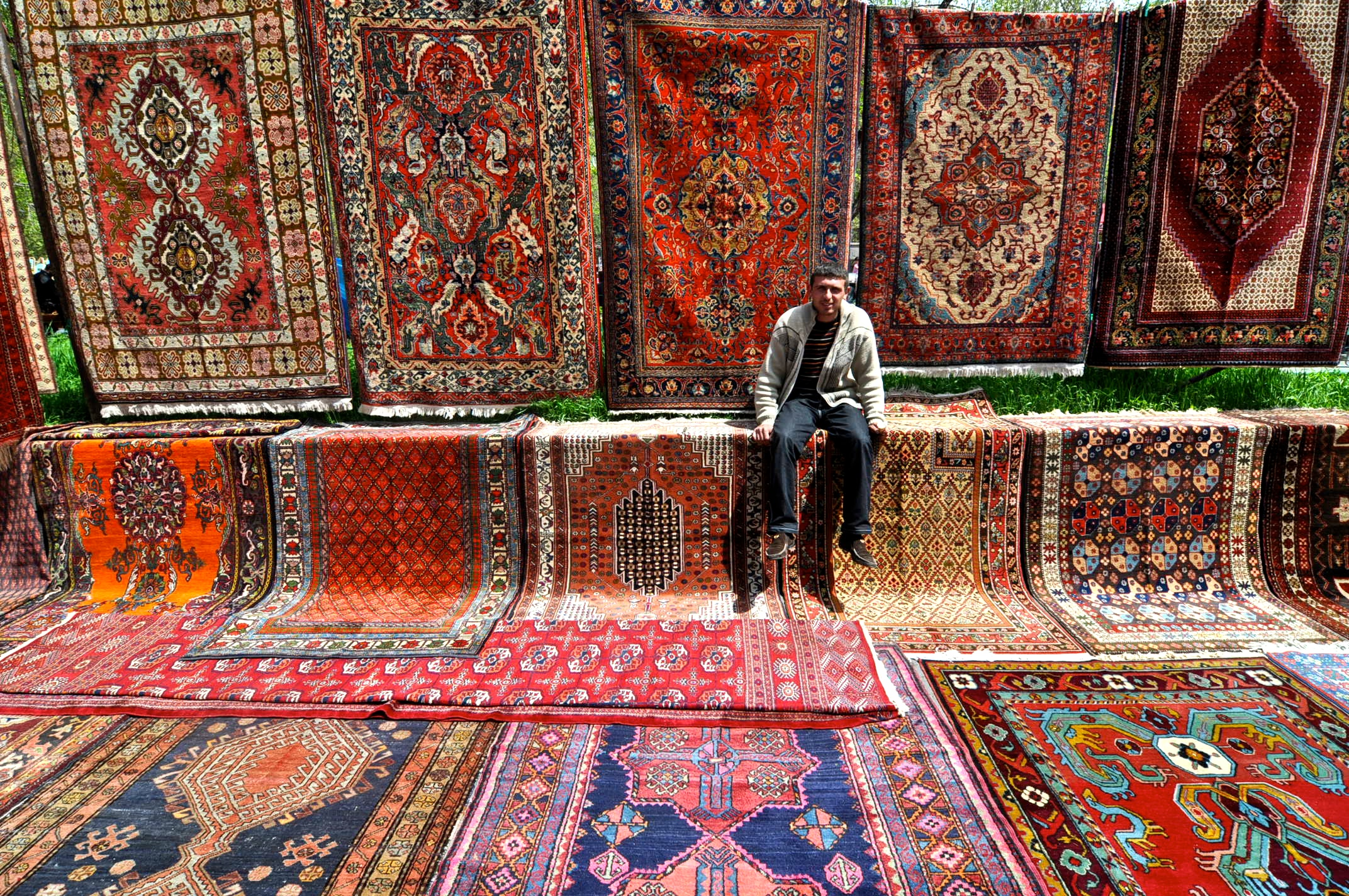
Armenian rugs at Vernissage market in Yerevan

Various rug fragments have been excavated in Armenia dating back to the 7th century BC or earlier. Complete rugs, or nearly complete rugs of this period have not yet been found. The oldest, single, surviving knotted carpet in existence is the Pazyryk carpet. Although claimed by many cultures, this square tufted carpet, almost perfectly intact, is considered by many experts to be of Caucasian, specifically Armenian, origin. The rug is woven using the Armenian double knot, and the red filaments color was made from Armenian cochineal. Traditionally, since ancient times the carpets were used in Armenia to cover floors, decorate interior walls, sofas, chairs, beds and tables. The Armenian words for carpet are "karpet" (Armenian: կարպետ) or "gorg" (Armenian: գորգ). Though both words in Armenian are synonymous, word "karpet" is mostly used for non-pile rugs and "gorg" is for a pile carpet. Though women historically dominated carpet-weaving in Armenian communities, several prominent carpet-weavers in Karabakh are known to have been men, and in some cases whole families took up the art. The oldest extant Armenian carpet from the region, referred to as Artsakh during the medieval era, is from the village of Banants (near Gandzak) and dates to the early 13th century. The first time that the Armenian word for pile carpets, gorg, was used in historical sources was in a 1242-1243 Armenian inscription on the wall of the Kaptavan Church in Artsakh.

Art historian Hravard Hakobyan notes that "Artsakh carpets occupy a special place in the history of Armenian carpet-making. Common themes and patterns found on Armenian carpets were the depiction of dragons and eagles. They were diverse in style, rich in color and ornamental motifs, and were even separated in categories depending on what sort of animals were depicted on them, such as artsvagorgs (eagle-carpets), vishapagorgs (dragon-carpets) and otsagorgs (serpent-carpets). The rug mentioned in the Kaptavan inscriptions is composed of three arches, "covered with vegatative ornaments", and bears an artistic resemblance to the illuminated manuscripts produced in Artsakh.

The art of carpet weaving was in addition intimately connected to the making of curtains as evidenced in a passage by Kirakos Gandzaketsi, a 13th-century Armenian historian from Artsakh, who praised Arzu-Khatun, the wife of regional prince Vakhtang Khachenatsi, and her daughters for their expertise and skill in weaving.

Armenian carpet was also renowned by foreigners who traveled to Artsakh; the Arab geographer and historian Al-Masudi noted that, among other works of art, he had never seen such carpets elsewhere in his life.

=== Art ===
The National Art Gallery in Yerevan has more than 16,000 works that date back to the Middle Ages. The National Gallery of Armenia, Modern Art Museum of Yerevan, and the Matenadaran are three examples of museums displaying various forms of visual art.

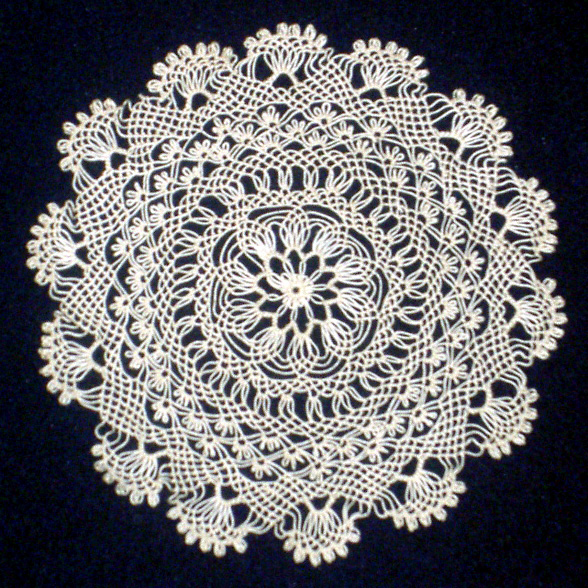
Armenian Needlelace circa 2004

=== Lacemaking ===
Like Lacis, Armenian needlelace seems to be an obvious descendant of netmaking. Where lacis adds decorative stitches to a net ground, Armenian needlelace involves making the net itself decorative. There is some archaeological evidence suggesting the use of lace in prehistoric Armenia and the prevalence of pre-Christian symbology in traditional designs would certainly suggest a pre-Christian root for this art form. In contrast to Europe where lace was the preserve of the nobility, in Armenia it decorated everything from traditional headscarves to lingerie. Thus lacemaking was part of many women's lives.

== Theatre ==
Born in Cairo, Egypt, Atom Egoyan is now an internationally known filmmaker who is celebrated for his contemporary work, including personal feature films and other related projects. He is the winner of many awards at international film festivals, such as the Grand Prix and international Critics' Awards from the Cannes Film Festival and two Academy Award nominations for "The Sweet Hereafter". Egoyan has also worked in the television and theatre industries, producing Wagner's Die Walkure which was performed by the Canadian Opera Company in April 2004. Egoyan's creation Ararat (2002) is about the 1915 Armenian Genocide perpetrated by the Ottoman Empire. It depicts the consequences and suffering of a child survivor Arshile Gorky.

== Music ==
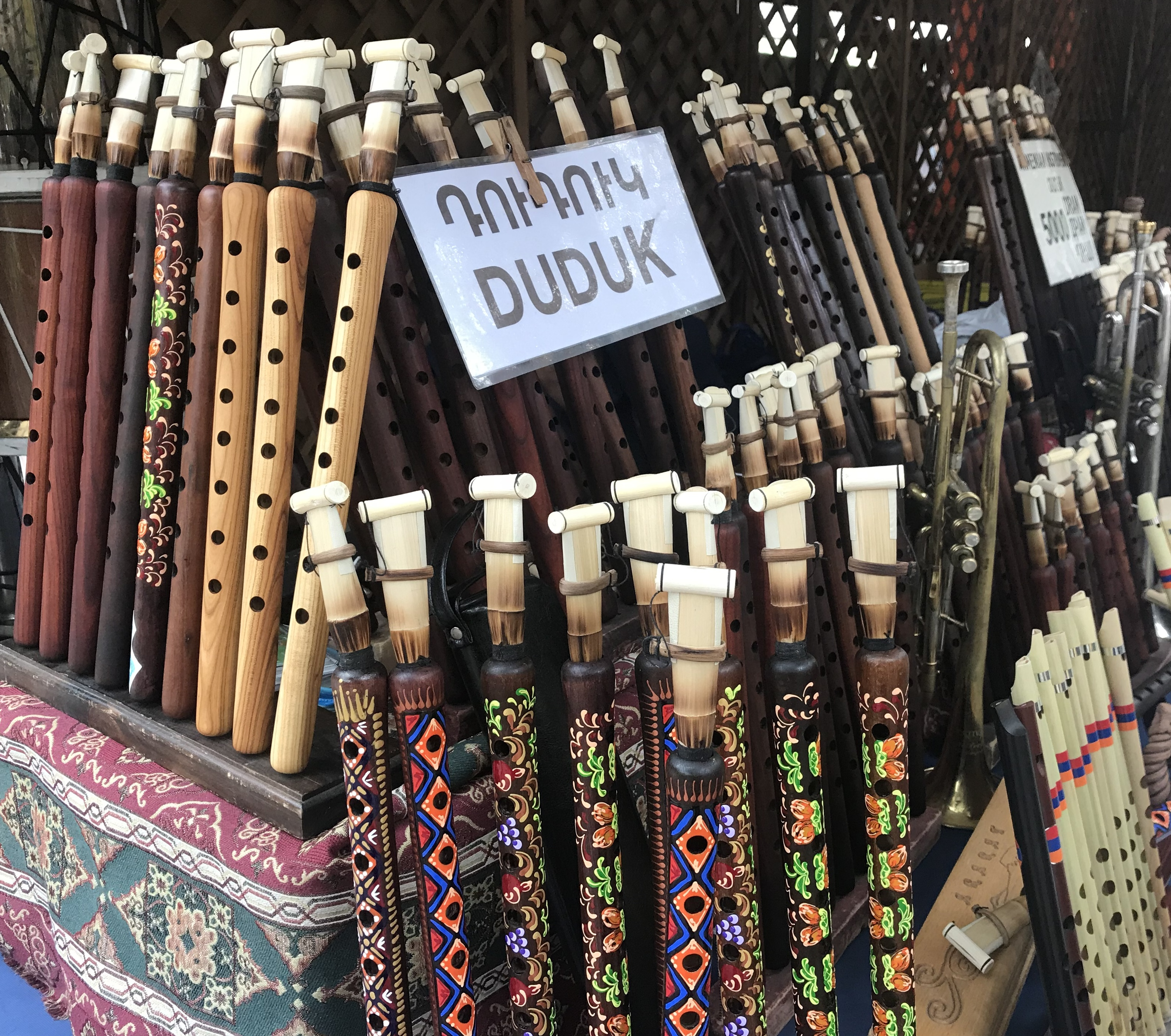
Duduk, traditional Armenian music instrument

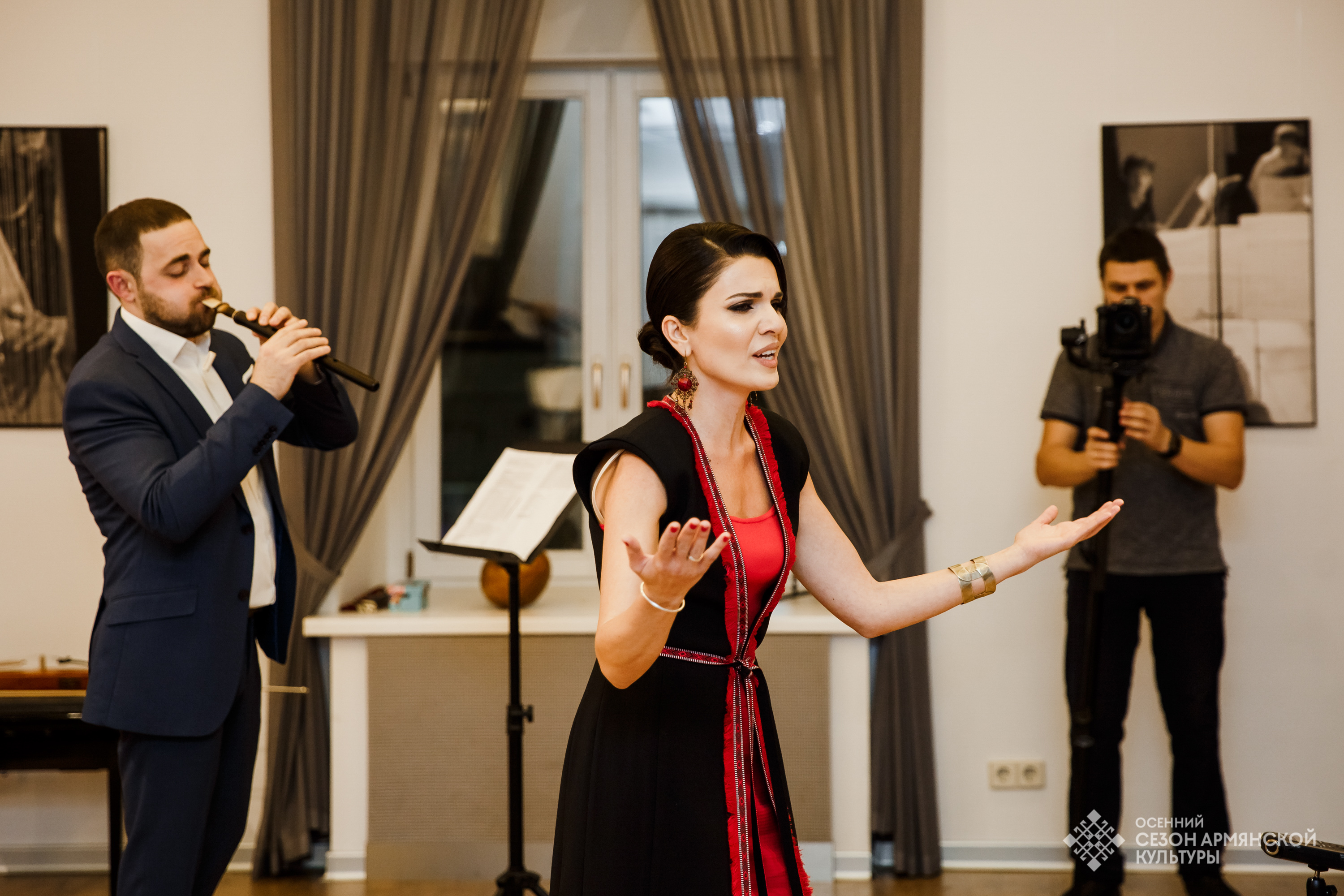
Duduk player and a singer

One of the most important parts of Armenian culture is the music, which has brought new forms of music in recent years, while maintaining traditional styles too. This is evidenced by the world-class Armenian Philharmonic Orchestra that performs at the beautifully refurbished Aram Khachaturian Concert Hall in the Yerevan Opera House, where one can also attend a full season of opera. In addition, several chamber ensembles are highly regarded for their musicianship, including the Komitas Quartet, Hover Chamber Choir, National Chamber Orchestra of Armenia and the Serenade Orchestra. Classical music can also be heard at one of several smaller venues, including the Yerevan State Musical Conservatory, the Komitas Chamber Music Hall and the Komitas Museum. Jazz is popular in Armenia, especially in the summer when live performances are a regular occurrence at one of the city's many outdoor cafés and parks. Armenian rock has made its input to the rock culture. The most known Armenian traditional instrument is the Ծիրանափող, meaning apricot flute, also known as duduk (pronounced [duˈduk] or doo-dook).

Modern day Armenian artists have incorporated folk music into more modern jazz and rock genres so that the traditional music still influences their creations, such as Zartong a late 70's Armenian progressive folk band based out of France.

Inga and Anush Arshakyans are a duet who create ethnographic music. After graduating from the Yerevan State Conservatory, the singers started performing together professionally in 2000. Later, in 2009 Inga & Anush represented Armenia in the Eurovision Song Contest in Moscow. They ended up taking the tenth place with 92 points. Their music is considered a mixture of Armenian folk music, rock, jazz and other contemporary genres.

Another singer from Yerevan, Armenia who is popular among young adults is Armen Gondrachyan, more famously known as 'Armenchik'. The influence of his father, who was also a singer, inspired Armen to start singing at the young age of seven. In 1989, Armen and his family moved to the United States, while in 1995, at the age of fifteen, he found a band and recorded his first album. In 1988, Armen went back to his hometown in Armenia and lived there for a year, and at the same time released the album, "Armen, memories from Armenia." This release initiated his path to star-dom. With his current fame, Armen is still very dedicated to the Armenian community. It was in October 2003 that he had his first concert in Glendale, California. The concert was a sellout, and in that same year, Armen received an award for the best-selling album of the year, "Anunt Inche".

Isabel Bayrakdarian is an opera singer of Armenian descent and is now known and popular both among Armenians and non-Armenians. She graduated from the University of Toronto with a degree in biomedical engineering, but has become very successful in North America as an opera singer and an active concertizer. She is featured on the Grammy-award-winning soundtrack of the film, the Lord of the Rings: The Two Towers. Bayrakdarian is also the winner of four Juno Awards for Best Classical Album (Vocal). Further, she is a featured vocalist of Atom Egoyan's movie, Ararat, in collaboration with the band "Delerium", which brought in another Grammy nomination.

Şahan Arzruni is an internationally renowned concert pianist, born in Istanbul, Turkey. Through his live performances and sound recordings he has disseminated the Armenian piano music throughout the world. He has some two dozen recordings, devoted mostly to the works of Armenian composer. Arzruni is also an author, a lecturer, a producer and impresario. He has been awarded two medals by the Armenian government for furthering Armenian culture. He lives in New York City.

Since 2014, The Naghash Ensemble has been touring in Europe performing new music by American-Armenian composer John Hodian based on sacred Armenian poetry by the medieval painter, poet and priest Mkrtich Naghash. With three female vocalists, duduk, oud, dhol and piano, The Naghash Ensemble combines new classical music and post-minimaslism with Armenian folk and spiritual music.

== Cinema ==
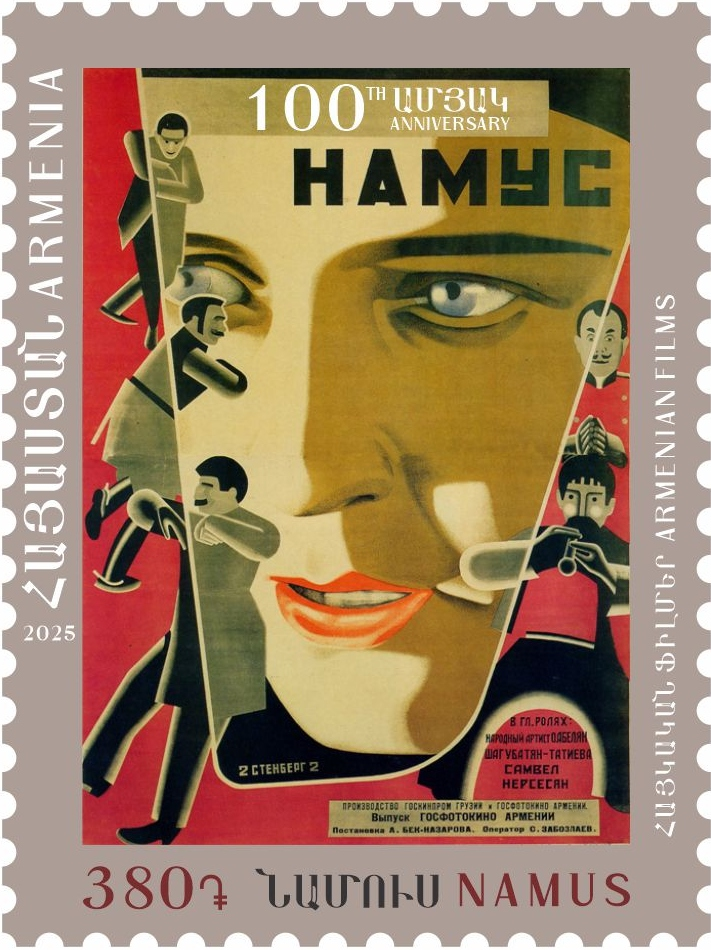
Poster of first Armenian film Namus on a 2025 stamp

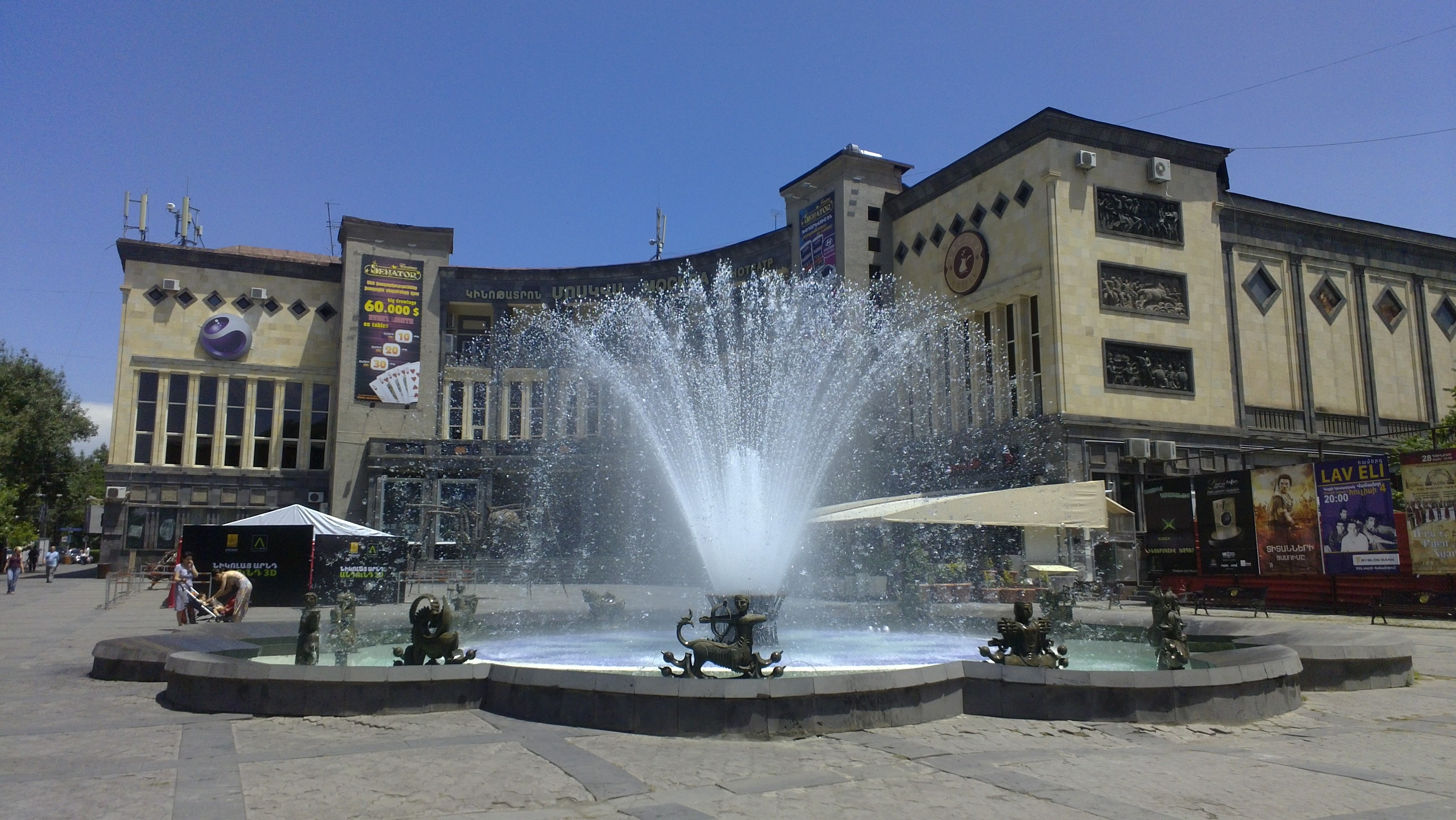
Moscow Cinema in Yerevan

Soviet Armenia (1924) was the first Armenian documentary film. Namus was the first Armenian silent black and white film (1926, Namus at IMDb), directed by Hamo Beknazarian and based on a play of Alexander Shirvanzade describing the ill fate of two lovers, who were engaged by their families to each other since childhood, but because of violations of namus (a tradition of honor), the girl was married by her father. In 1969, Sergei Parajanov created The Color of Pomegranates.

== Cuisine ==
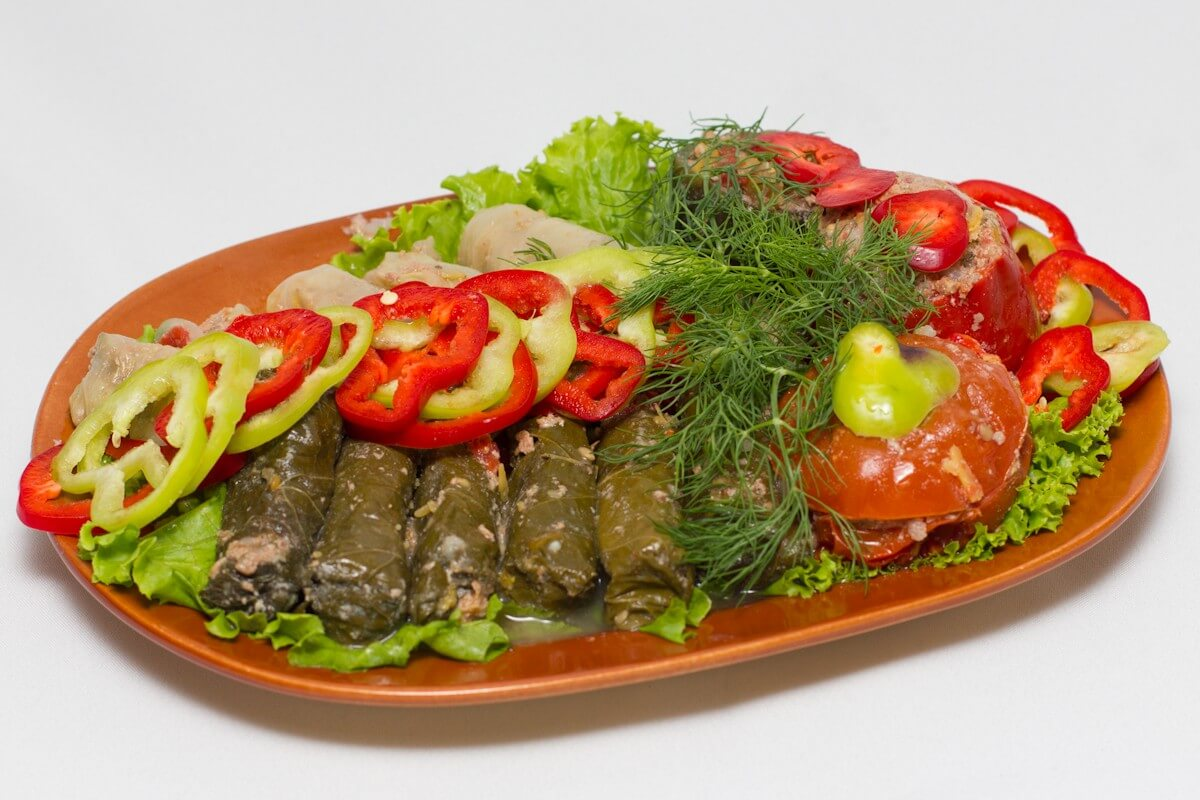
Armenian Tolma

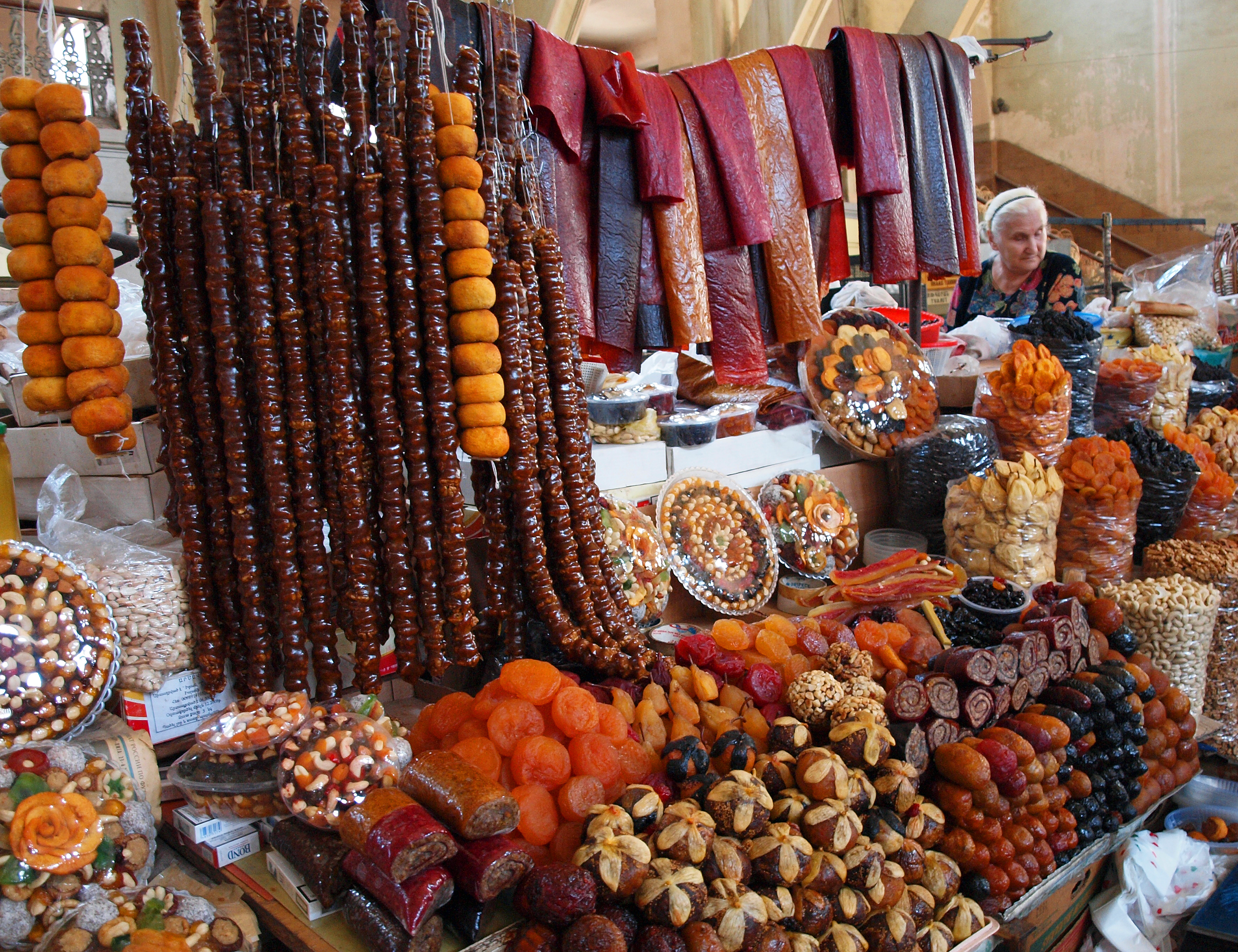
Dried fruit products at a market in Yerevan

Armenian cuisine is as ancient as the history of Armenia, and is known for often having a distinct smell. Closely related to Eastern European and Mediterranean cuisine, various spices, vegetables, fish, and fruits combine to present unique dishes. Armenia is also famous for its wine and brandy. In particular, Armenian cognac is renowned worldwide (winner of several awards), and was considered by the late British Prime Minister, Sir Winston Churchill, as his favourite.

A very important aspect of the Armenian cuisine is the traditional bread called Lavash. In 2014, "Lavash, the preparation, meaning and appearance of traditional bread as an expression of culture in Armenia" was included in the UNESCO Representative List of the Intangible Cultural Heritage of Humanity.

The Armenian soup, Khash, also has its own, unique place in the Armenian cuisine. The name khash originates from the Armenian verb khashél (Armenian: խաշել), which means "to boil." The dish, initially called khashoy, is mentioned by a number of medieval Armenian authors, e.g. Grigor Magistros (11th century), Mkhitar Heratsi (12th century), Yesayi Nchetsi (13th century), etc.

The pomegranate, with its symbolic association with fertility represents that nation. The apricot is the national fruit. Since Roman times, the apricot was known as Prunus Armeniaca, literally translated as " Armenian Plum". According to encyclopedia.com, "a popular Armenian drink to this day is tan, a mixture of water and soured yogurt".

== Language ==
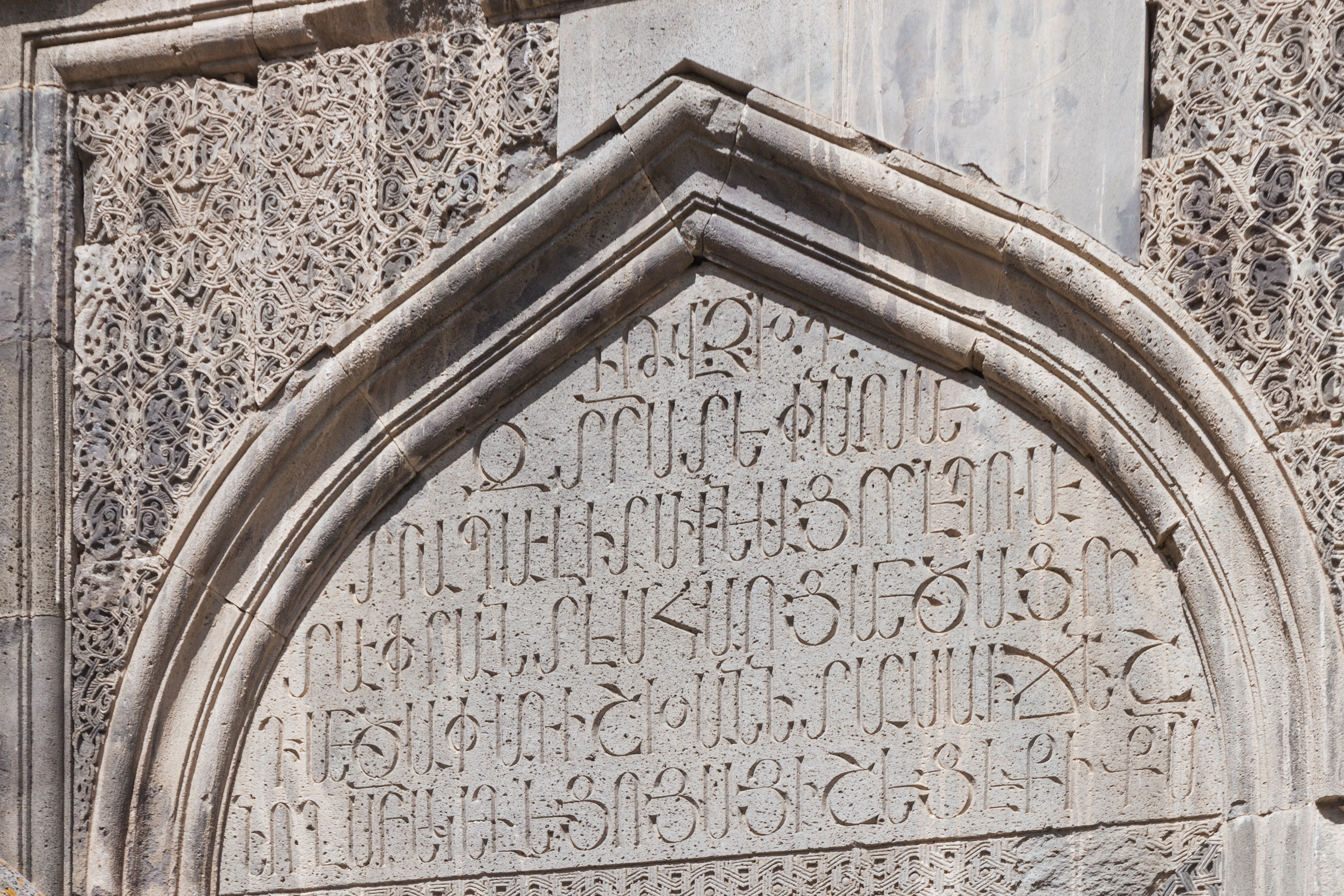
Armenian language in Tatev Monastery, with its unique scripts

The Armenian language dates to the early period of Indo-European differentiation and dispersion some 5000 years ago, or perhaps as early as 7,800 years ago according to some recent research. Trade and conquest forced the language to change, adding new words into the people's vocabulary. Literature and books written in Armenian appeared by the 4th century. The written language of that time, called classical Armenian or grabar, remained the Armenian literary language, with various changes, until the 19th century. Meanwhile, spoken Armenian developed independently of the written language. Many dialects appeared when Armenian communities became separated by geography or politics, and not all of these dialects are mutually intelligible. English is a popular language in the business world.

== Religion ==
The dominant religion in Armenia is Christianity and the Armenian Apostolic Church is the national church of Armenia.

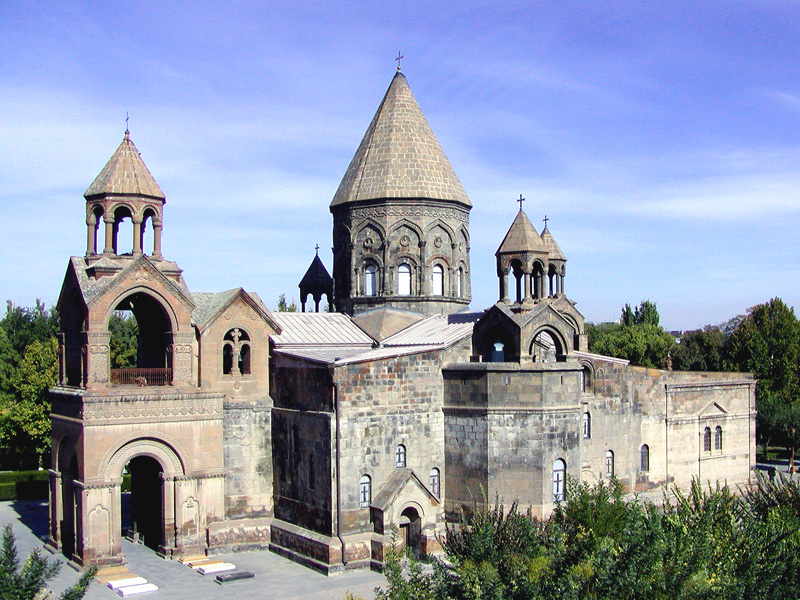
Etchmiadzin Cathedral

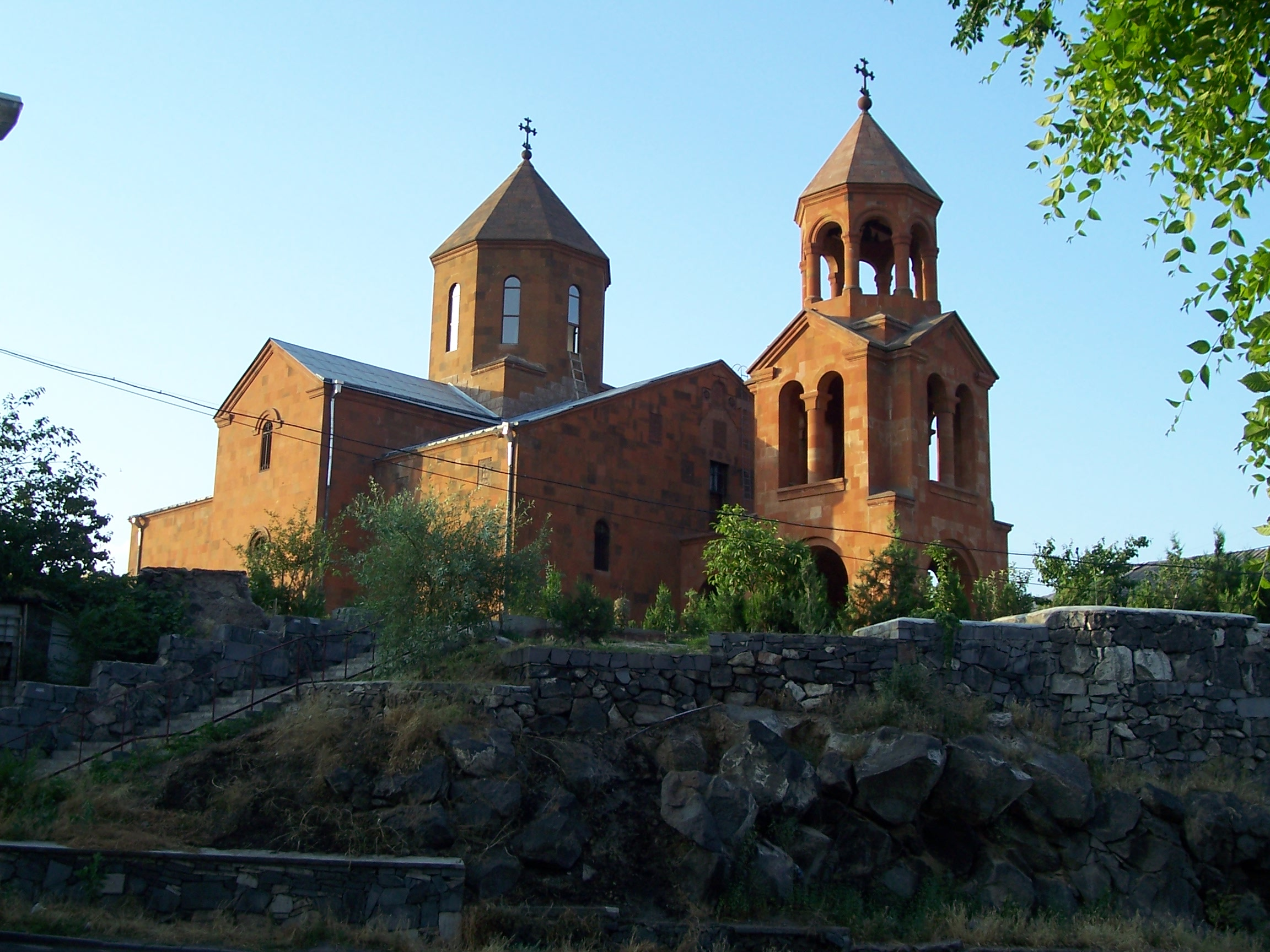
Saint John the Baptist Church

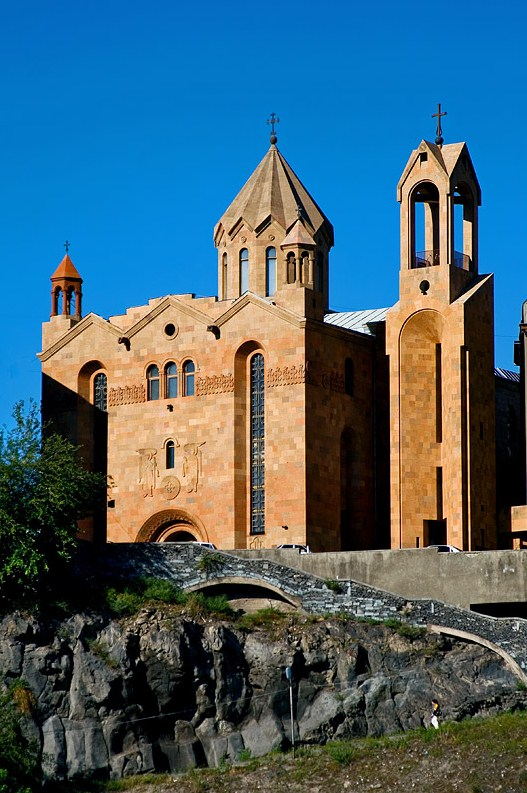
Saint Sarkis Cathedral

== Sports ==
A wide array of sports are played in Armenia. Football is the most popular sport in Armenia. Other popular sports are wrestling, weightlifting, judo, chess, and boxing. Armenia's mountainous terrain provides great opportunities for the practice of sports like skiing and rock climbing. Being a landlocked country, water sports can only be practiced on lakes, notably Lake Sevan. Competitively, Armenia has been very successful at chess, weightlifting, and wrestling at the international level. Armenia is also an active member of the international sports community, with full membership in the Union of European Football Associations (UEFA), Federation of International Bandy (FIB), and International Ice Hockey Federation (IIHF). It also hosts the Pan-Armenian Games.

In Post-Soviet countries, the Armenian football players are well known for their skills and well developed techniques. This is mainly due to the success of the Armenian players such as, Khoren Hovhannisyan, Eduard Markarov, Levon Ishtoyan, Nikita Simonyan, etc. One of the biggest successes of Armenian club was the took place in the golden year of 1973, where the famous Armenian club Ararat Yerevan took both, the title of the Soviet Top League and the Soviet Cup.

Since independence, Armenia has been very successful in chess. Armenia's men team have won the Chess Olympiad 3 times, making them 5th most successful team in chess world history. Famous chess players, such as Tigran Petrosyan and Garry Kasparov are both of Armenian origins.

== See also ==
- Armenian dress
- Armenian jewelry
- Culture of Artsakh
- History of Armenia
- Lists of Armenians
- List of libraries in Armenia
- List of museums in Armenia

== Books ==
- Nina G. Garsoïan. Church and Culture in Early Medieval Armenia. — Ashgate, 1999.
- Vrej Nersessian, Tim Greenwood. Art of the Armenians. — Sam Fogg, 2004.
- Nira Stone, Michael E. Stone. The Armenians: Art, Culture and Religion. — Chester Beatty Library, 2007.

On folktales:

- Seklemian, A. G. The Golden Maiden and Other Folk Tales and Fairy Stories Told in Armenia. Cleveland and New York: The Helman-Taylor Company. 1898.
- Macler, Frédéric. Contes arméniens. Paris: Ernest Leroux Editeurs. 1905.
- Hoogasian-Villa, Susie. 100 Armenian Tales and Their Folkloristic Relevance. Detroit: Wayne State University Press. 1966.
- Surmelian, Leon. Apples of Immortality: Folktales of Armenia. Berkeley and Los Angeles: University of California Press. 1968.
- Downing, Charles. Armenian Folk-tales and Fables. London: Oxford University Press. 1972. ISBN 0-19-274117-9.
- Avakian, Anne M. Armenian Folklore Bibliography. University of California Press. 1994. ISBN 9780520097940.
