= Armenian art =

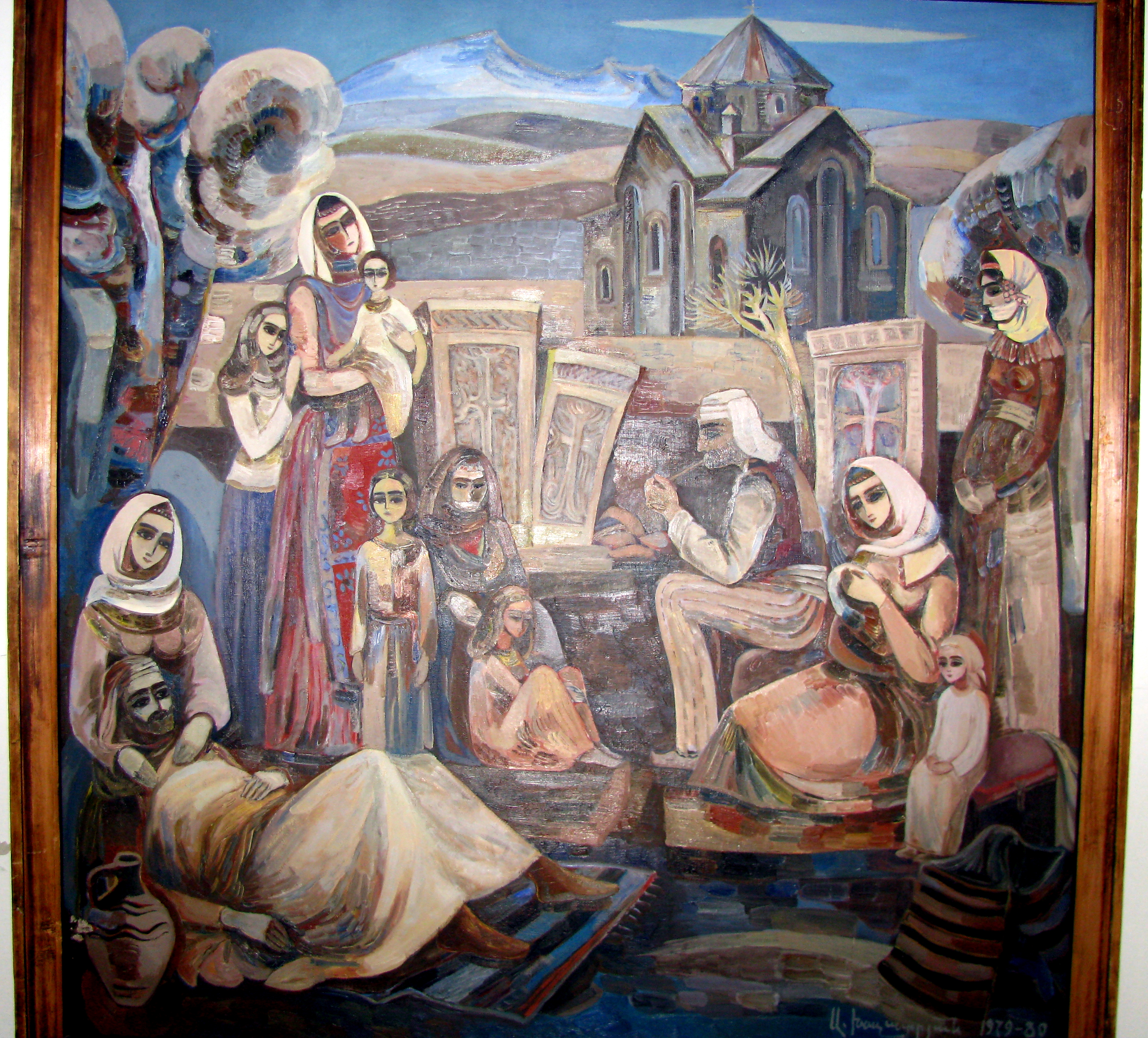
An Armenian painting at the art museum in Vanadzor, Armenia

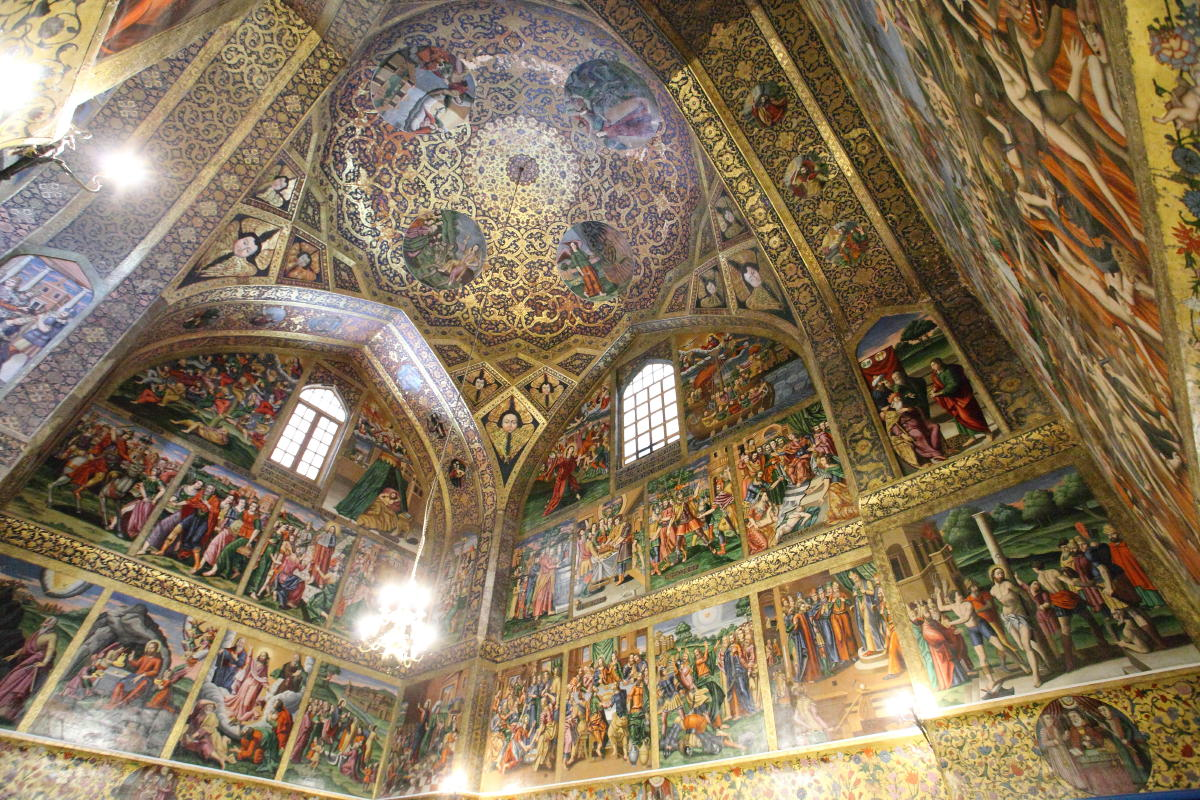
Armenian frescoes inside the 17th-century Vank Cathedral in New Julfa, Iran

Armenian art is the unique form of art developed over the last five millennia in which the Armenian people lived on the Armenian Highland. Armenian architecture and miniature painting have dominated Armenian art and have shown consistent development over the centuries. Other forms of Armenian art include sculpture, fresco, mosaic, ceramic, metalwork, engraving, and textiles, especially Armenian carpets.

Prehistoric Armenia was home to the Urartu culture in the Iron Age, notable for its early metal sculptures, often of animals. The region was, as later, often contested by the large empires holding the nearby regions of Persia, Mesopotamia and Anatolia. The Armenians adopted Christianity very early, and developed their own version of Eastern Christian art, with much use of icons, Armenian miniatures in books, and the very original architecture of their churches and monasteries. A distinctive Armenian feature, which may have influenced the Medieval art of Europe, was the popularity from early on of figurative relief carvings on the outside of churches, unknown in Byzantium.

Armenians specialized in arts and crafts such as carpet-weaving.

== Study of Armenian art history ==
The study of Armenian art began in the early 20th century. Notable scholars of Armenian art were Catholicos Garegin Hovsepian and professor Sirarpie Der Nerséssian. More recently, Jean-Michel Thierry and Professor Dickran Kouymjian are prominent scholars of Armenian art.

== Architecture ==
The first Armenian churches were built during the lifetime of St. Gregory the Illuminator, were often built on the sites of destroyed pagan temples, and imitated some aspects of Armenian pre-Christian architecture.

Classical and Medieval Armenian architecture is divided into four separate periods.

The first period, from the 4th to the 7th centuries, began with Armenia's conversion to Christianity, and ended after the Arab invasions of Armenia. The early churches were mostly simple basilicas, some with side apses. By the 5th century the typical cupola cone in the center had become widely used. By the 7th century, centrally-planned churches had been built and the more complicated niched buttress and radiating Hrip'simé style had formed. By the time of the Arab invasions, most of what we now know as classical Armenian architecture had formed.

The second period lasted from the 9th to the 11th centuries. Armenian architecture underwent a revival under the patronage of the Bagratid dynasty with many buildings erected in the regions of Ani and Lake Van: these included both traditional styles and new innovations. Ornately carved Armenian khachkars were developed during this time. Many new cities and churches were built during this time, including a new capital at Lake Van and a Cathedral on Akdamar Island to match. The Cathedral of Ani was also completed during this dynasty. It was during this time that the first major monasteries, such as Haghpat and Haritchavank were founded. This period was ended by the Seljuk invasion.

== Miniatures ==
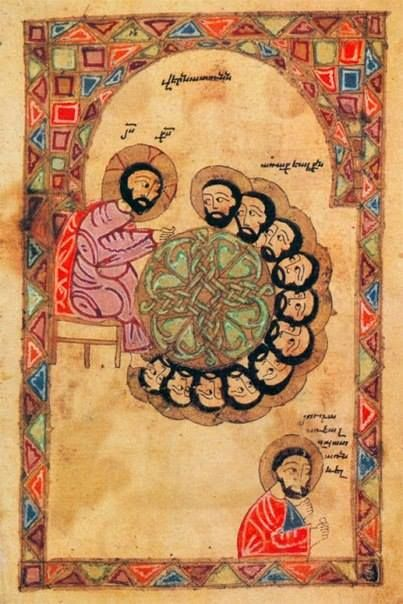
The Last Supper, from the illuminated manuscript, end of the 14th century, Artsakh

Illuminated manuscripts were produced in Armenia mainly between the 5th and the 17th centuries. The highest point of this art is associated with the 13th century and the name of Toros Roslin, considered to be the most prominent medieval Armenian manuscript illuminator. The majority of the manuscripts were lost, and scholarly approach to studies of Armenian illuminated manuscripts was only developed in the second half of the 20th century.

== Sculptures ==
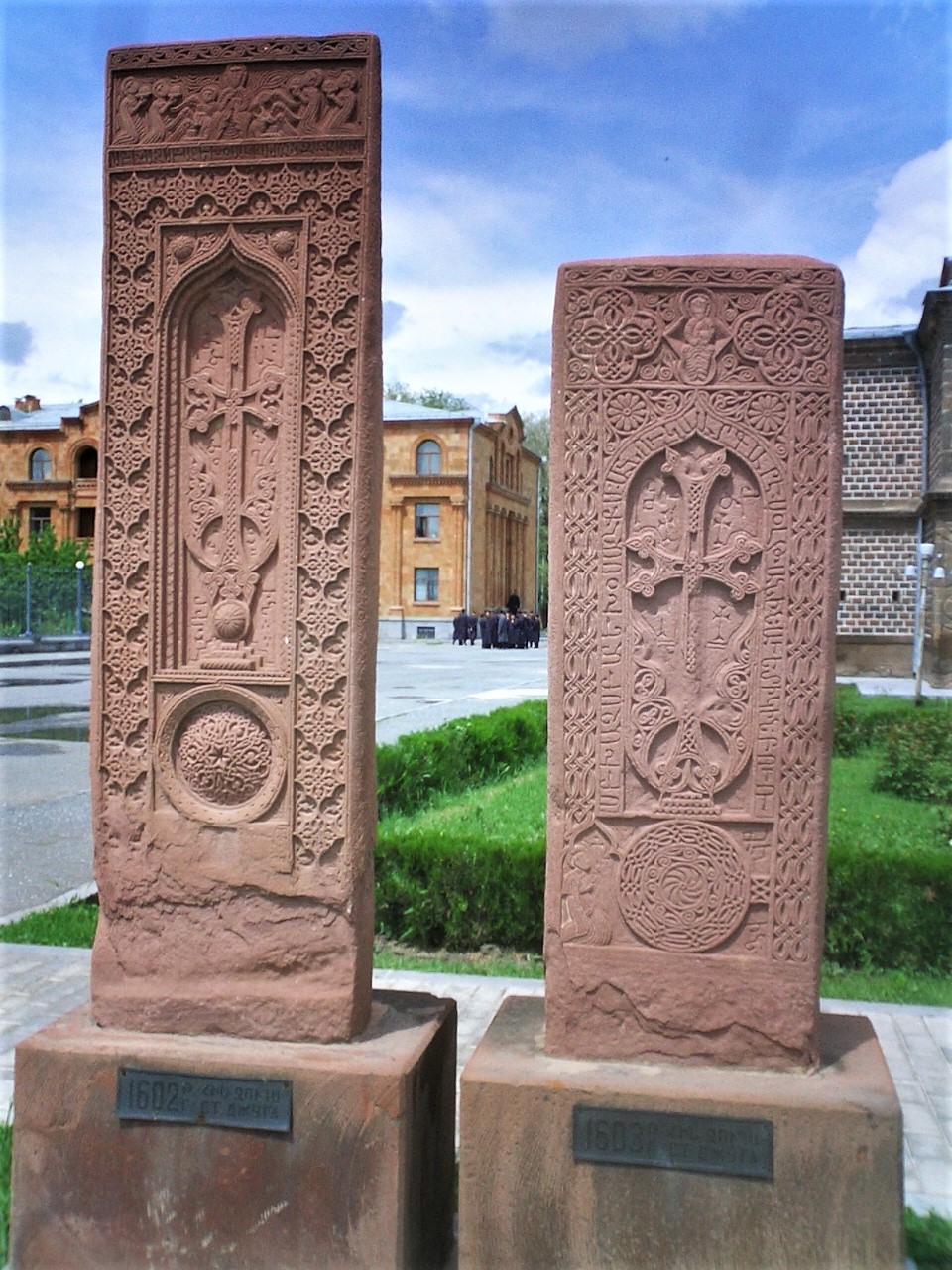
Late-medieval Armenian Khachkars from Julfa

Among the most prolific and characteristic objects of Armenian sculptural history are khachkars, carved cross-stones extant from the early Middle Ages and collectively recognized on the UNESCO list of Intangible Cultural Heritage since 2010. The word “khachkar” is formed by two Armenian roots: “khach” (cross) and "kar" (stone). Armenia has been called “a country of rocks” and has a rich heritage when it comes to sculptures. Other representative sculptures include vishapakar or "dragon-stones" in Armenian, prehistoric monoliths which long predate the formation of the Kingdom of Armenia. Besides these ancient sculptures, Armenia also has plenty of post-war sculptures which show the influence of modern times and also foreign traditions that have been adopted.

== Frescoes, Mosaics, and Ceramics ==
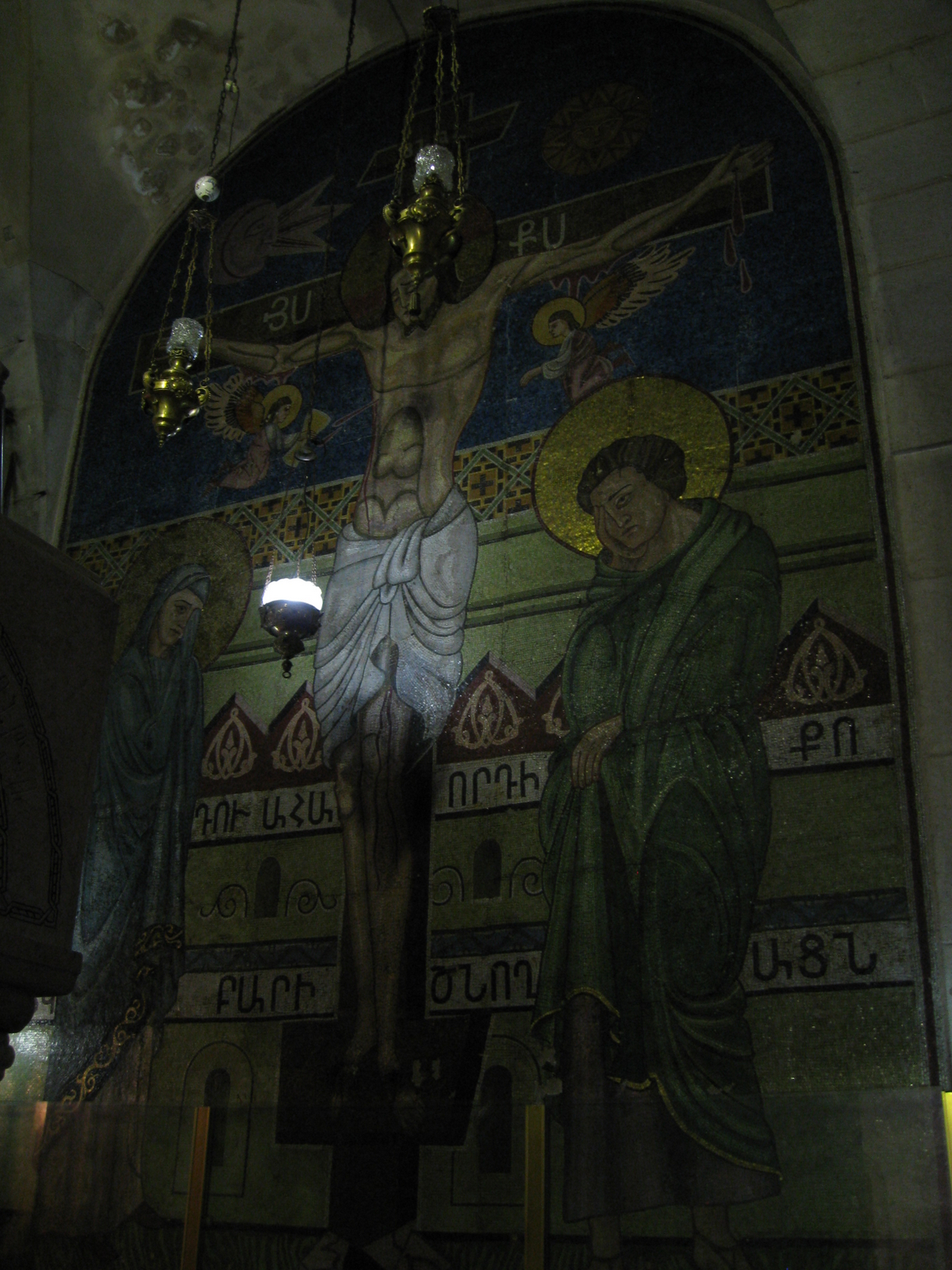
An Armenian fresco of Christ at the Church of the Holy Sepulchre in Jerusalem.

Ceramics, mosaics, and frescoes constitute a different category of Armenian artwork. The creation of the outlined artifacts dates back to the days of the Urartian Empire that existed long before the establishment of Armenia as a nation. Therefore, some of the ancient art is shared among several countries in the region that were part of the Urartian Empire. While the evidence of these forms of art was realized through excavations in the country, their remains have been reconstructed thus providing physical evidence of what they looked like.

=== Gallery ===
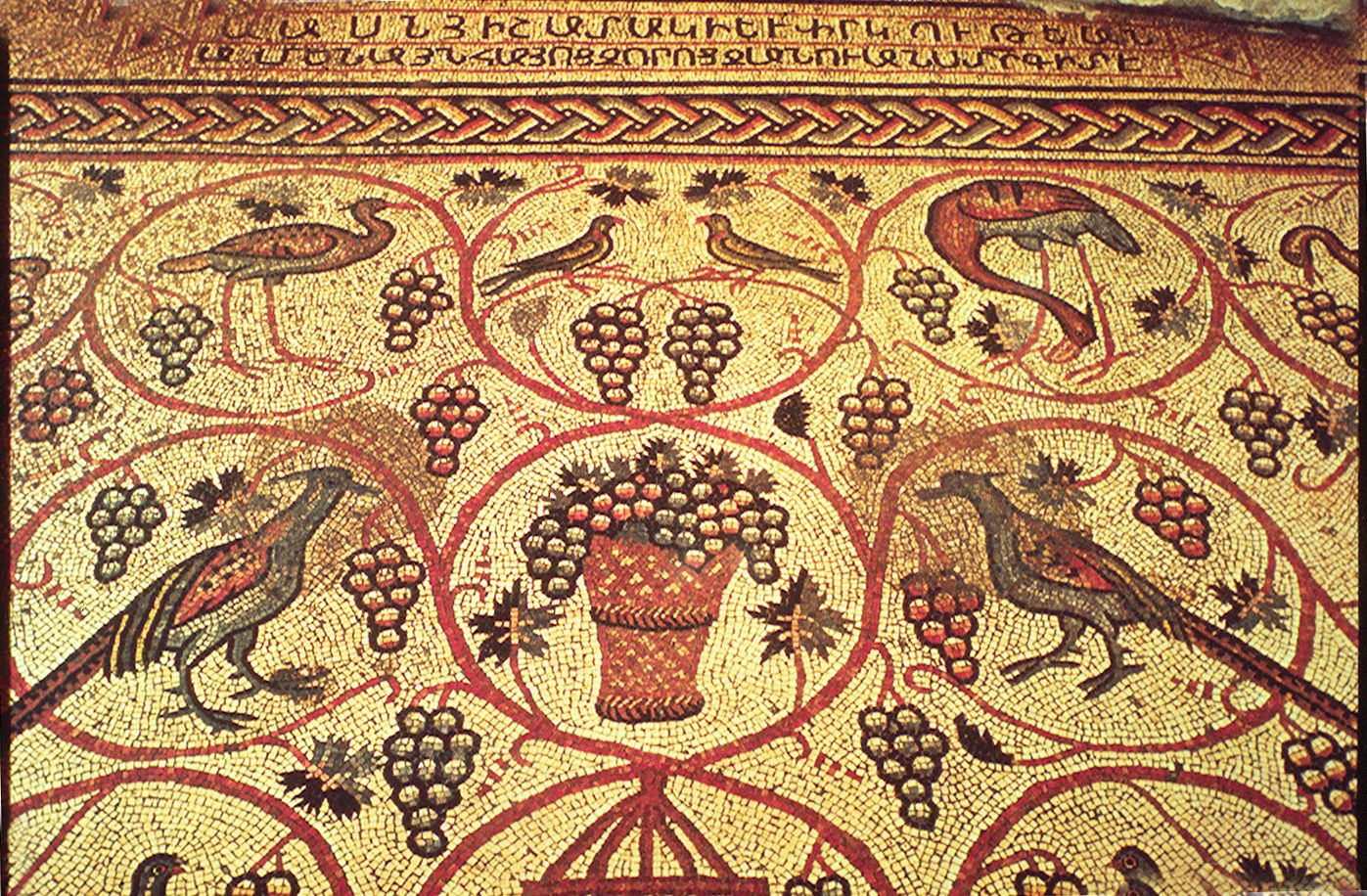
Armenian Birds Mosaic in Jerusalem

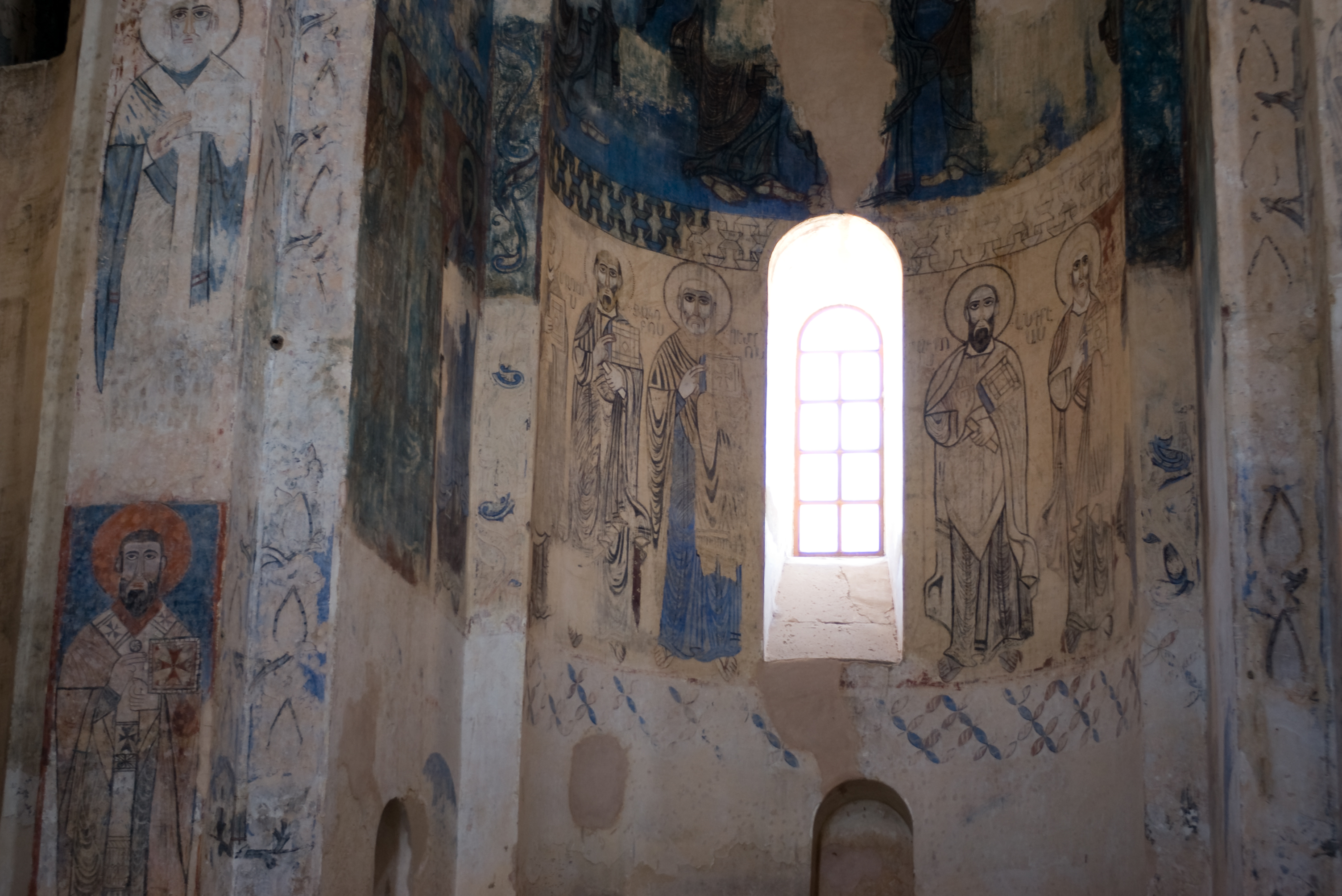
Wall paintings inside the Church of Akhtamar

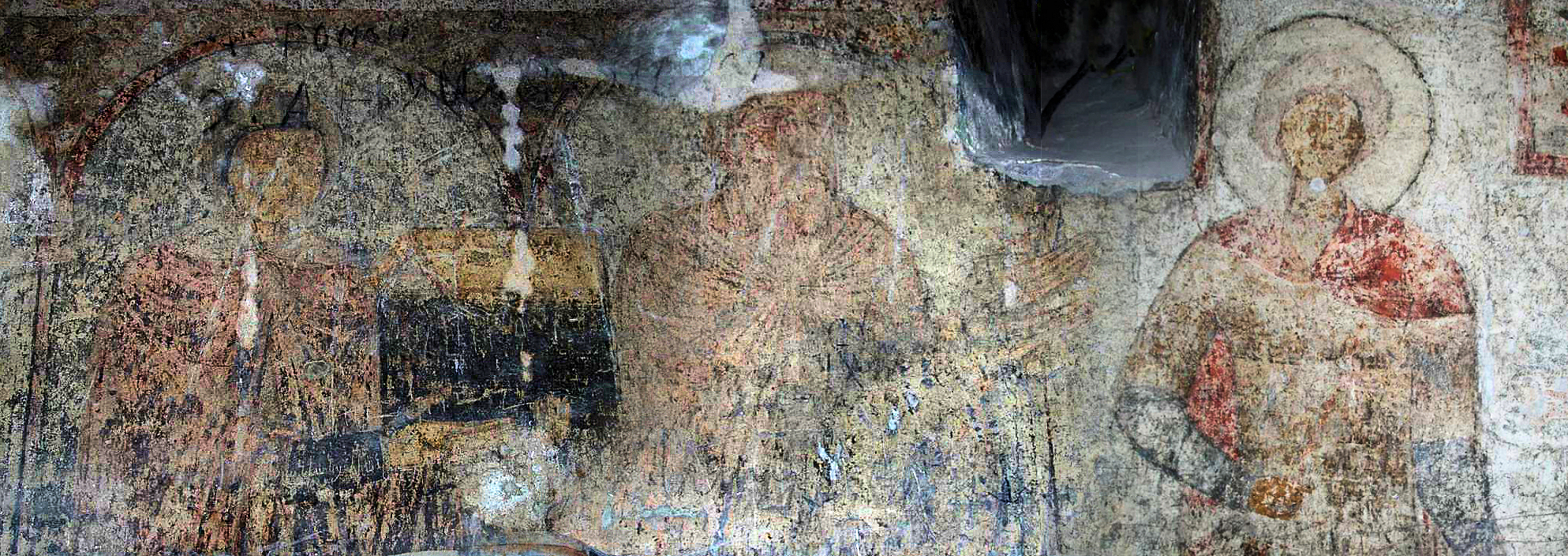
Probable depictions of Shahnshah's wife Vaneni (left), her husband Shahnshah Zakarian (middle), and a kindred in military uniform (right), as donators at the Kobayr Monastery Chapel-Aisle

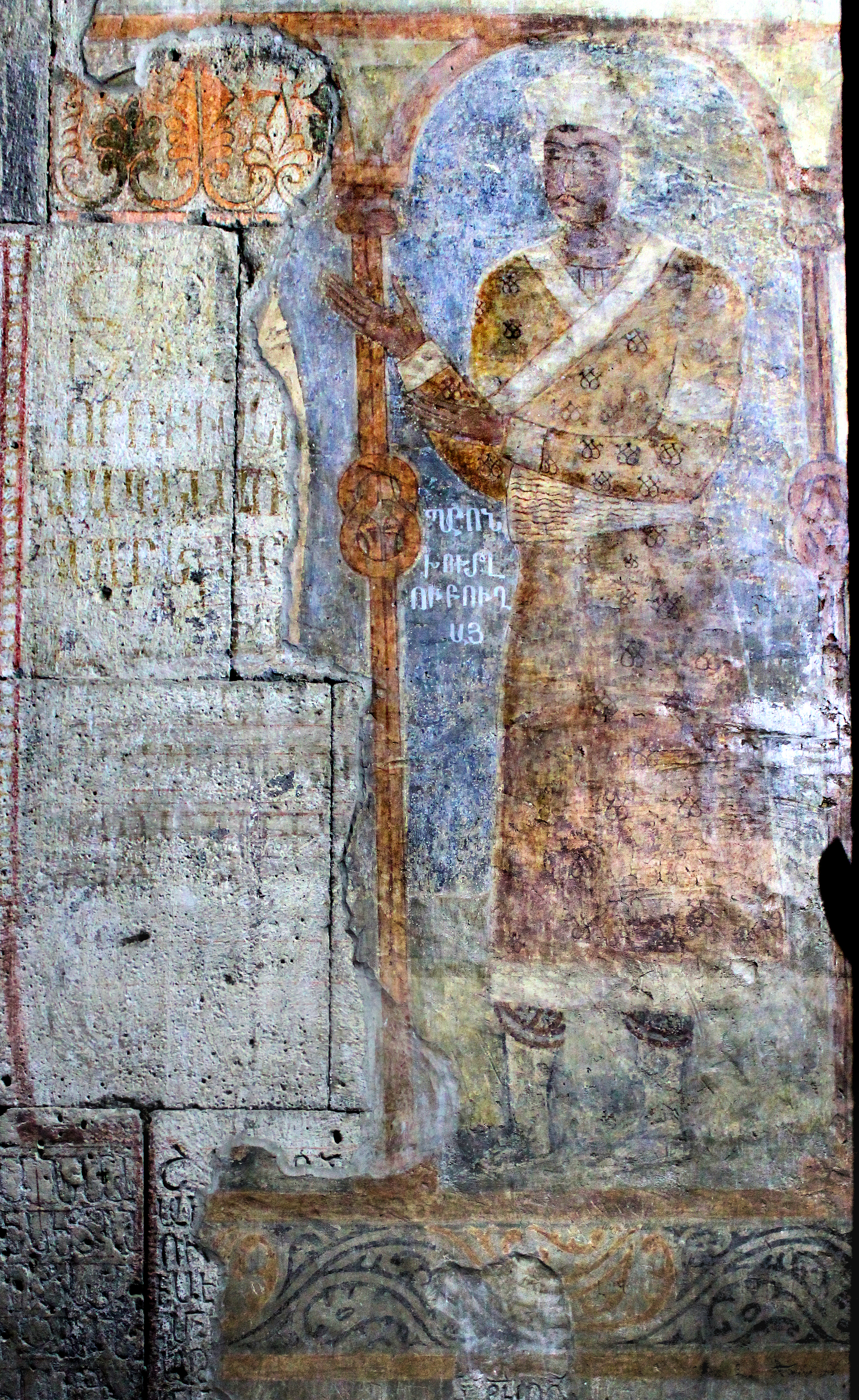
Mural representing Khutlubuga in the Church of the Holy Sign, Haghpat Monastery

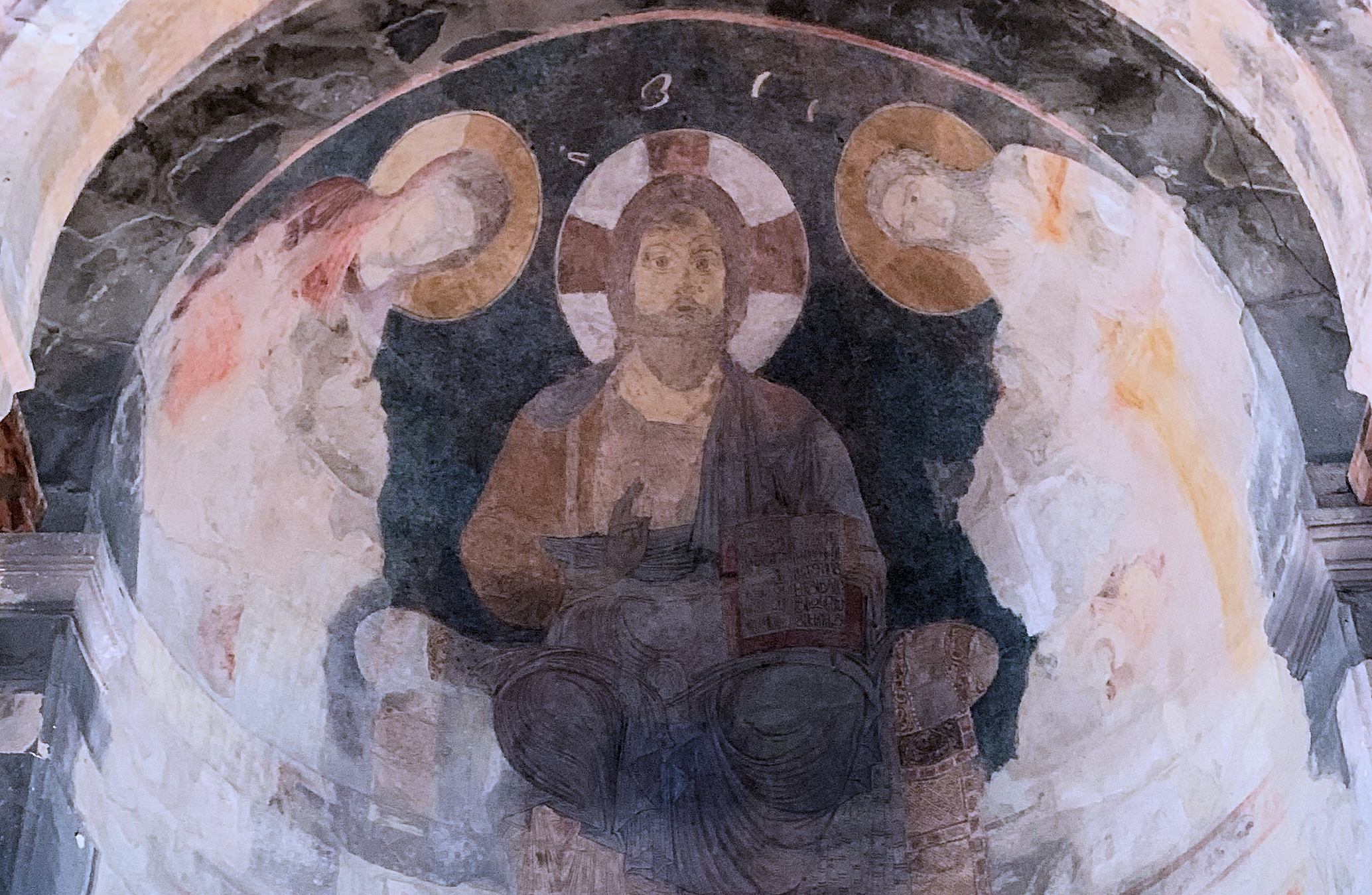
Wall painting of Deesis in Haghpat Monastery

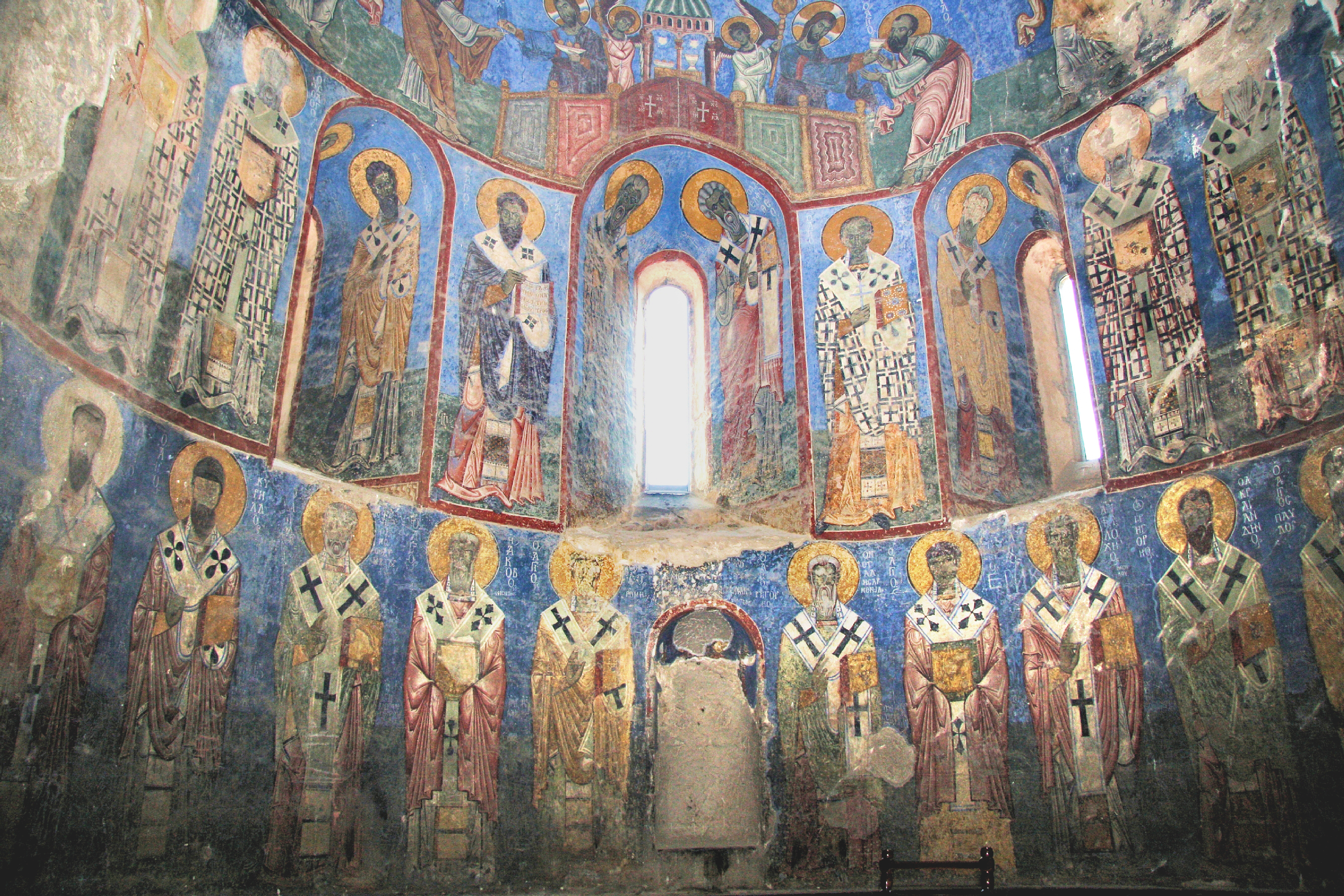
The murals of various saints in Akhtala Monastery

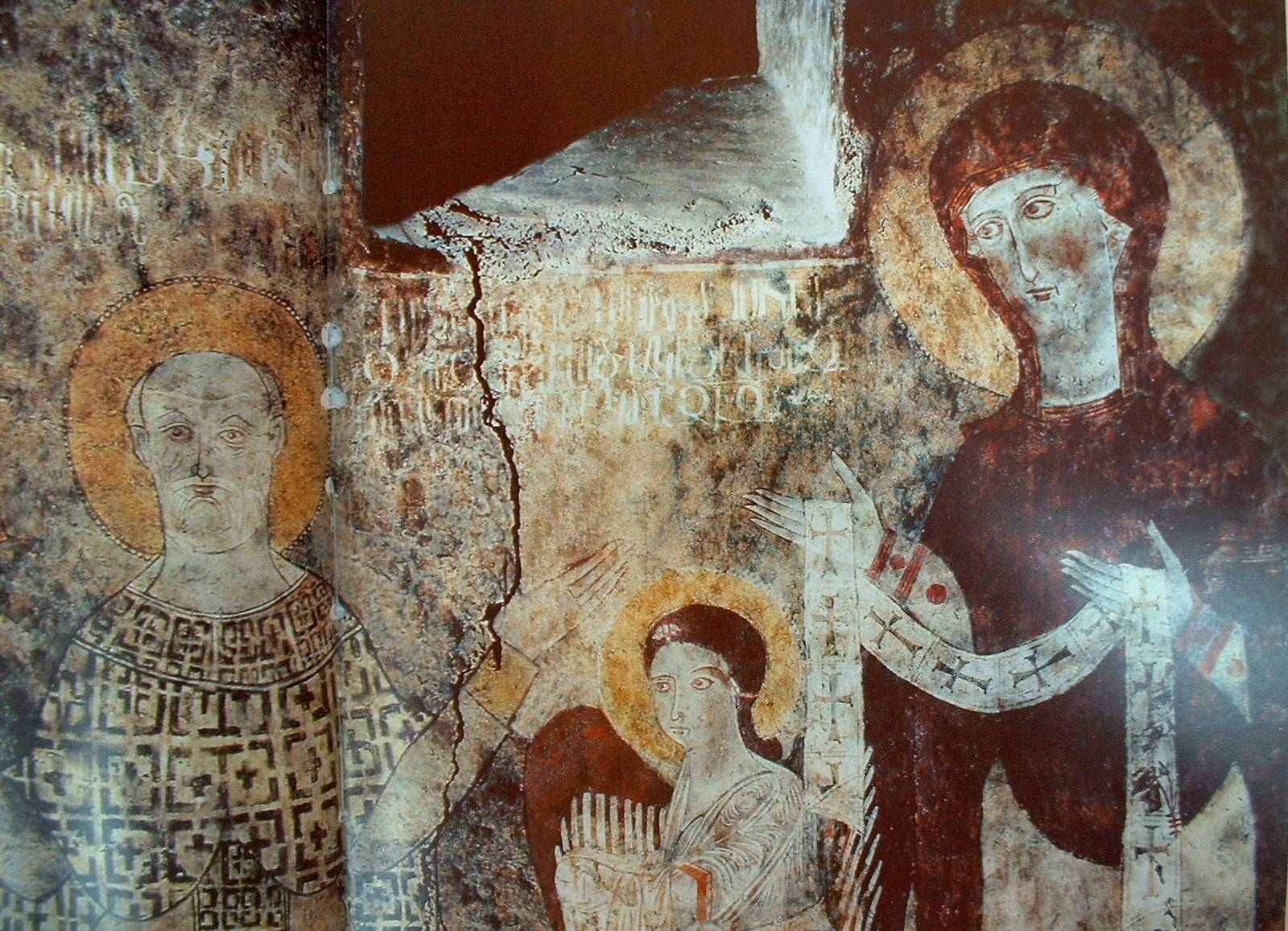
Fragment of a 13th-century fresco with Armenian inscribed text in Dadivank Monastery

== Metalwork and Engravings ==
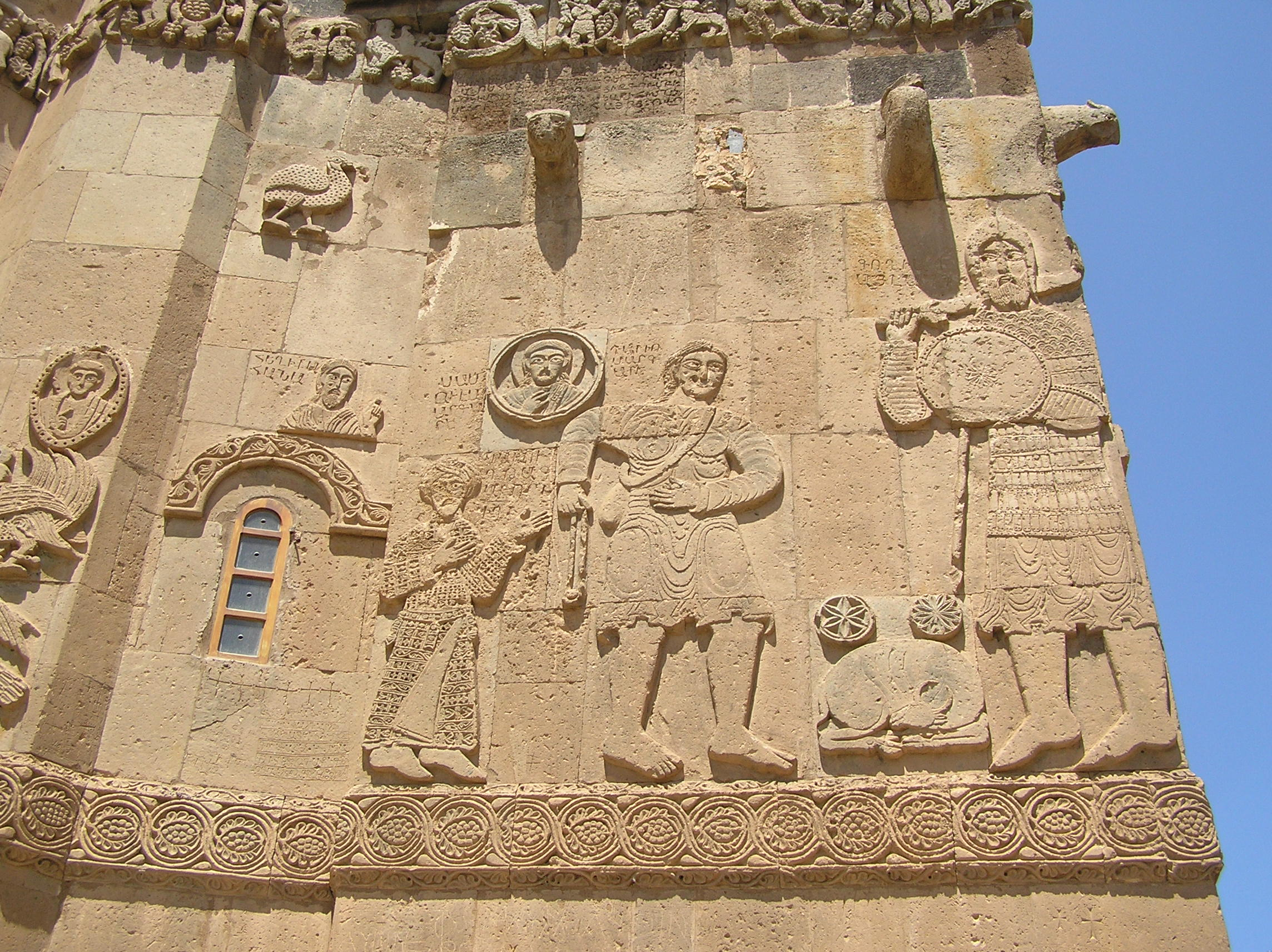
Biblical scenes carved into the external wall of the 10th-century Cathedral of the Holy Cross on Akhtamar Island on Lake Van

Armenia has a history of making engravings and metalwork which are also considered as part of the art. Artifacts in this category can be subdivided into coins, silver and gold, and bronze and tinned copper. The coins refer to the pieces of metals that were designed during the ancient times for trading purposes between Armenia and its neighbors such as Greece. On the other hand, gold and silver were luxury items during ancient Armenia which were fashioned in various ways such as drinking vessels, medallions, and statues just to mention a few. Besides, tinned copper and bronze were also used. Excavations in the country have revealed that these were used to make household items, weapons, and even statues.

== Textiles ==
Textiles are another part of Armenian art and also a significant part of their economy both in the ancient and present times. One of the most extensive collections of Armenian textiles can be found in the Armenian Museum of America. In the current world, textile products from Armenia are a major trade commodity between Armenia, Europe, and America.

== Music and dance ==
Dance and Music are also an essential aspect of the Armenian Heritage. Initially, Armenian music consisted of Armenian Church music and folk songs that were based on an indigenous tonal system (Tetrachords) as opposed to the European tonal system. However, in the present time, other genres of music have influenced Armenian music thus resulting in the production of modern styles in the country such as Hip Hop, Pop, Rock, among many others. Accompanying original Armenian songs was Armenian dance. Native Armenian dance is one of the oldest practices of the inhabitants of the region. Armenian dance is even depicted in some of the ancient paintings on rocks.

== Modern art ==
=== Modernist art ===
Famous Armenian modernist artists include painters like Arshile Gorky and Paul Guiragossian.

==== Third Floor Group ====
In 1987, several artists — including Arman Grigoryan, Sev (Hendrik Khachatryan), Karen Andreasyan and others — set up an exhibition in the Artists' Union of Armenia's building in Leninakan, in the conference hall on the third floor. The resulting Third Floor (Armenian: Երորդ Հարկ) modern art group has been described as "anti-Soviet, anti-Establishment and in some ways anti-art, a clever appropriation of and comment on several movements, including performance art and American Pop Art." By 1994, the group dispersed as its utopian mood faltered in the wake of post-independence hyperinflation and power outages.

=== Contemporary art ===
In 2015, Armenia won the Leone d'Oro for Best Pavilion at the Venice Biennale. Besides the above-discussed art categories, Armenia also has well developed contemporary art which is overseen by the Biennale Foundation. The Foundation is responsible for organizing exhibitions in the country which are termed as Art Biennale. The name is used so as to distinguish its exhibitions from other shows conducted by different organizations. The institution has been doing its activities that date back from 1948 to date.

== See also ==
- Culture of Armenia
- List of Armenian artists
- Armenian jewelry
- Armenian needlelace

=== Art galleries in Armenia ===
- Cafesjian Museum of Art
- National Gallery of Armenia

== Bibliography ==
- Thierry, Jean-Michel (1989). Armenian Art. New York: Harry N. Abrams. ISBN 0-8109-0625-2.
