= Arpine Mikaeli Ter-Petrosyan =

Arpi Alto
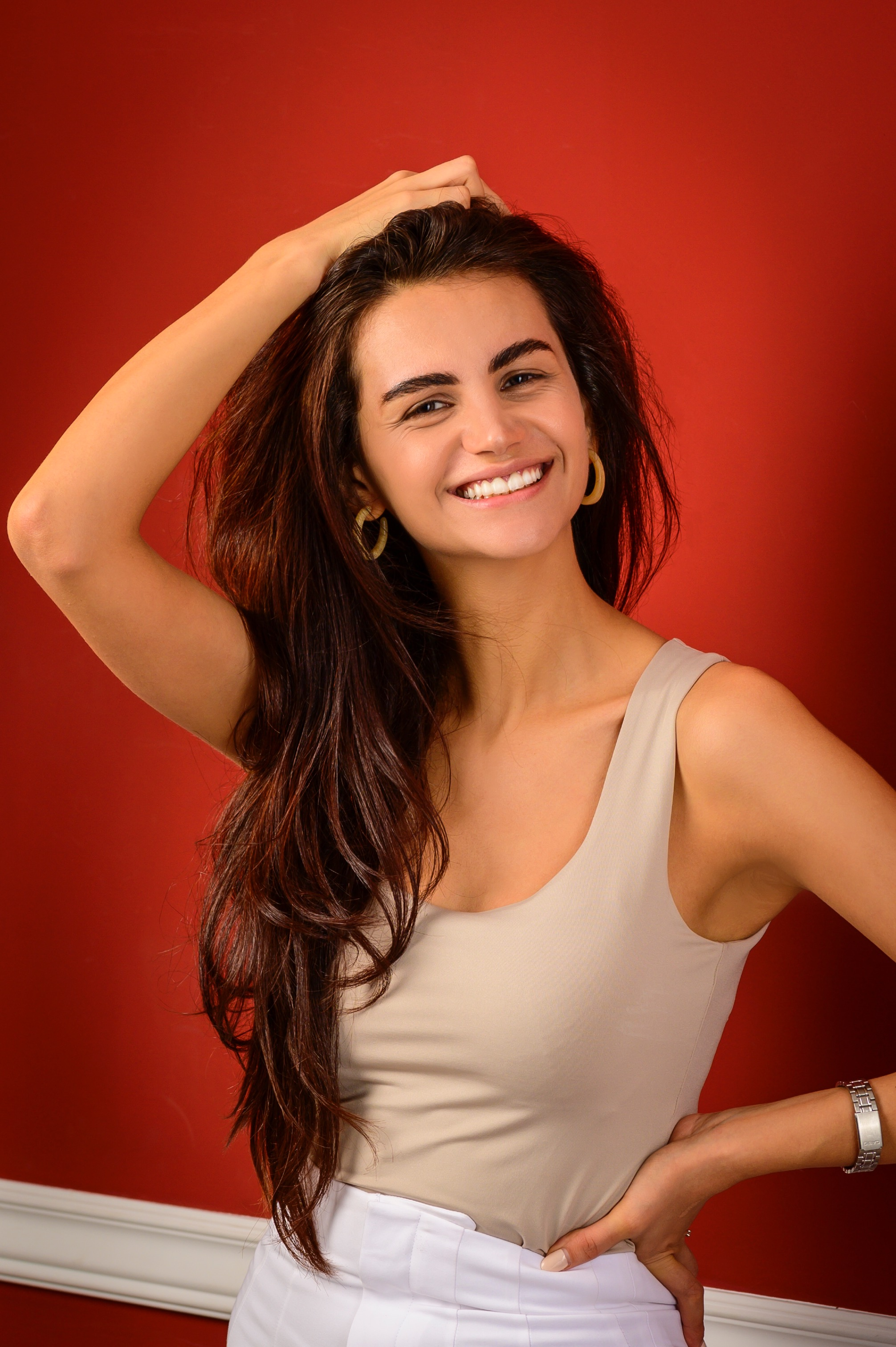
- Arpi Alto

Background information
- Born: Arpine Mikaeli Ter-Petrosyan; September 30, 1990; Yerevan, Armenia
- Genres: Cool jazz; bossa nova; Music of Armenia
- Instrument: Piano
- Years active: 2011–present
- Label: Arpi Alto
- Website: https://arpialto.com/home

Arpine Mikaeli Ter-Petrosyan (born September 30, 1990) whose artistic name is Arpi Alto (Armenian: Արփի Ալտո), is an Armenian singer, songwriter, musician and record producer.

She was born in a family of artists and musicians. Her mother, Anahit Ter Petrosyan, is an Armenian jazz artist. Her father, Mikayel Ter Petrosyan, is a sculptor, painter, and specialist in handmade rugs. She is married and she has one child.

She received her higher education as a pianist at the Khachatur Abovyan State Pedagogical University of Armenia, completing her master's degree in 2016. While her professional career began in 2011, when she joined the Vocal Ensemble of Geghard Monastery, and in 2013 she was admitted to the National Academic Theater of Opera and Ballet of Armenia Alexander Spendiarian. She is a member of the Armenian contemporary music group The Naghash Ensemble. She sang for several years with the Naghash Ensemble, specializing in reinterpreting Armenian poems from the Middle Ages.

Arpi caused a huge reaction in Brazil by posting her versions of world-famous bossa nova classics on social media. She achieved great success with her versions of the Brazilian bossa nova classic Garota de Ipanema, The Way You Look Tonight and the samba Mas que Nada. She has been touring in over 15 countries in Europe, the Middle East and Russia.

She sings in Armenian, English, Russian and Portuguese. In 2021 she released her first CD, My Soul in the Mountains.

Arpi’s vocals are close to the contralto vocal type, probably somewhere in between mezzo-soprano and contralto, making her a rare talent. As an opera singer she has great control over her vocals, demonstrated in her video performances, mainly on YouTube.
