= Mkrtich Naghash =

Mkrtich Naghash (Armenian: Մկրտիչ Նաղաշ, lit. 'Mkrtich the Painter'; 1394 – 1470) was an Armenian painter, poet, and priest. He served as Archbishop of Diarbekr.

Mkrtich Naghash's poetry describes the perils of living a life in exile and man's relationship with God.

In 2006, American-Armenian composer John Hodian started creating "Songs of Exile," a cycle of new music based on Mkrtich Naghash's poems. He founded The Naghash Ensemble, and since 2014, the ensemble has been touring internationally.
