= The Naghash Ensemble =

Armenian contemporary music ensemble

- Origin: Yerevan, Armenia
- Genres: New Classical, Armenian folk
- Instruments: Duduk, oud, dhol, piano
- Years active: 2010–present
- Labels: Epiphany Records, Available Forms Music
- Members: Hasmik Baghdasaryan (soprano), Tatevik Movsesyan (soprano), Arpine Ter-Petrosyan (alto), Tigran Hovhannisyan (dhol), Aram Nikoghosyan (oud), Emmanuel Hovhannisyan (duduk), John Hodian (piano/composer)
- Website: www.naghashensemble.com

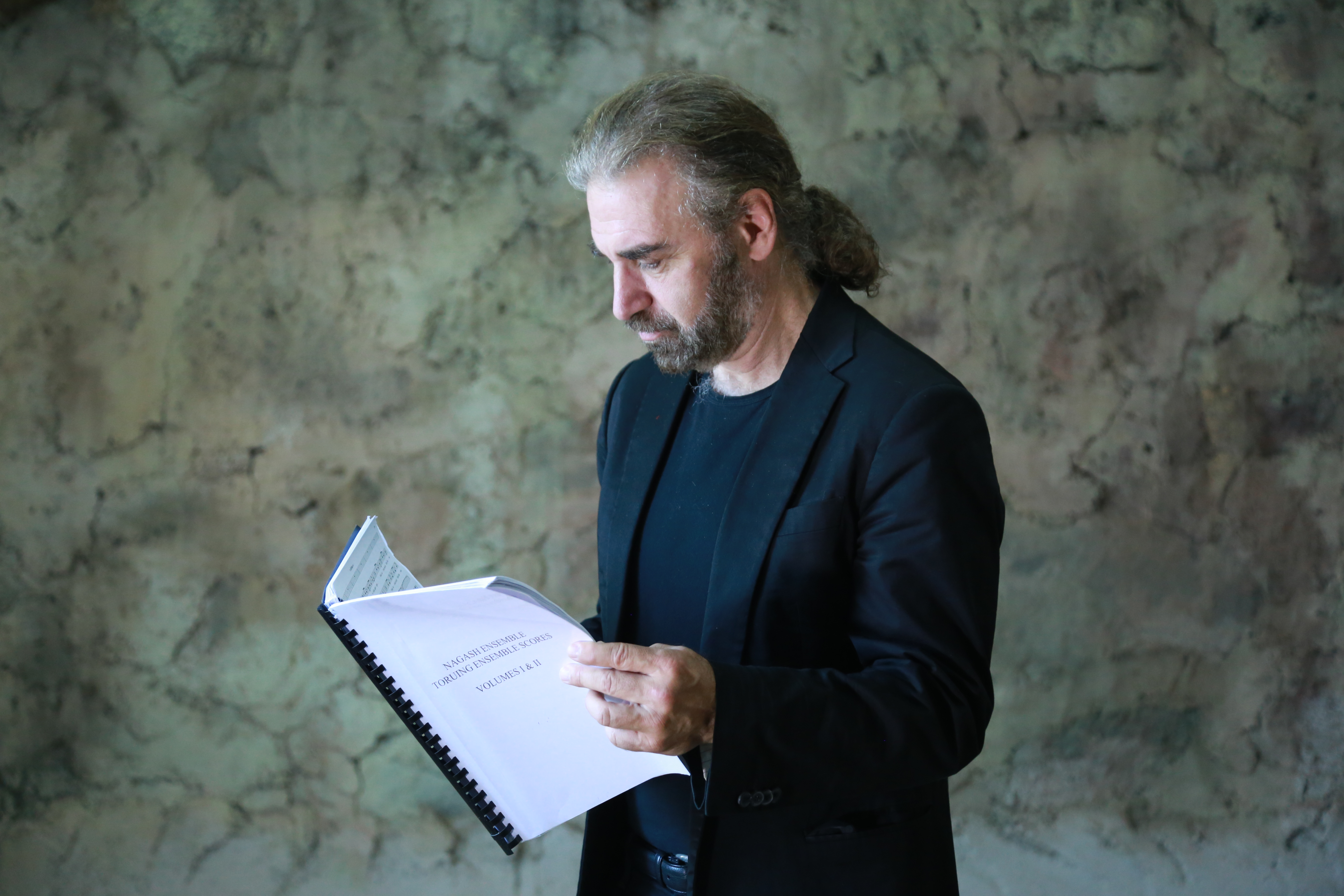
John Hodian in 2014

The Naghash Ensemble is a contemporary music ensemble from Armenia featuring three female singers, duduk, oud, dhol and piano. They perform new music written by Armenian-American composer John Hodian based on sacred texts by the medieval Armenian mystic poet and priest, Mkrtich Naghash. Described as "The sound of ancient Armenia reinvented for the 21st century" by Armenian composer Tigran Mansurian, Hodian's "Songs of Exile" combines "the earthy spirituality of Armenian folk song, new classical music, contemporary post-minimalism and the energy of rock and jazz".

== History ==
=== Inspiration and text ===
In the book accompanying The Naghash Ensemble's first CD, "Songs of Exile, Volume I," John Hodian describes the origins of the ensemble. In 2006, he had heard soprano Hasmik Baghdasaryan singing medieval Armenian spiritual music in the ancient temple of Garni, Armenia. Fascinated by the sound of her voice and the acoustics of the temple, he vowed to write music that would use this sound in a new way. After several years of searching for texts he felt would match the spiritual quality of the music he was hearing in his head, he found a fragment of a poem written by the 15-century Armenian poet and priest Mkrtich Naghash. The poem "Composed in Exile" deals with the tragedy of life in exile from an Armenian perspective. Mkrtich Naghash only left 16 poems behind, and John Hodian set all of them to music.

=== Instrumentation ===
In 2010, John Hodian founded The Naghash Ensemble to premiere "Songs of Exile". Choosing the instrumentation for this project intuitively, he combined "formal elements such as piano and strings balanced by Armenian folk instruments such as dhol, duduk and oud". He initially wrote the music for five female vocalists, duduk, oud, dhol and string quartet. For the international touring version of the ensemble, he kept the duduk, oud, dhol, cut the five vocalists down to three and rearranged the string parts for piano.

In December 2017, The Naghash Ensemble premiered an orchestral version of "Songs of Exile" in collaboration with the SYOA orchestra at the Yerevan Opera Theater in Armenia. This orchestral version allows for a collaboration between The Naghash Ensemble and any-size string sections. The European premiere of this project took place on 2 August 2019 with the South Czech Philharmonic at the International Music Festival Český Krumlov.

=== Touring ===
Since 2014, the ensemble has been touring regularly in Europe, including performances in France, Belgium, The Netherlands, (Germany), Austria, Switzerland, Italy, Latvia, Lithuania and Armenia. The ensemble plays at classical music venues, sacred music festivals, world music series as well as rock and jazz festivals.

Their concerts have been described as "a moment of grace and meditation" (Rolling Stone), "[a] sacred beauty that incites a mixture of joy and ecstasy" (Trans Musicales) and "music that is foreign and familiar, earthy and otherworldly" (WDR 3).

=== CDs and Books ===
The Naghash Ensemble's first CD, forming the first volume of the three-volume project "Songs of Exile" was published in 2014, followed by the ensemble's first international tour. The second CD "Songs of Exile, Volume II: Credos & Convictions" followed in 2016. The third CD, "Songs of Exile, Volume III: Lamentations & Benedictions" was released in late 2019.

The German radio station BR Klassik describes the ensemble's second CD as an "intersection of classical music, jazz, folk and post-minimalism", with "music that draws from old and new worlds, from everything John Hodian encountered on his way from Philadelphia to New York and Yerevan, and which forms something like a musical home to him. It's equally influenced by Bach, Steve Reich and Joni Mitchell, as it is by the Armenian music he grew up listening to at his parents' home."

== Current members ==
- Hasmik Baghdasaryan (soprano)
- Tatevik Movsesyan (soprano)
- Arpine Mikaeli Ter-Petrosyan (alto)
- Tigran Hovhannisyan (dhol)
- Aram Nikoghosyan (oud)
- Emmanuel Hovhannisyan (duduk)
- John Hodian (piano/composer)

== Discography ==
=== Albums ===
- 2019. Songs of Exile, Volume III: Lamentations & Benedictions. Available Forms Music
- 2016. Songs of Exile, Volume II: Credos & Convictions. Available Forms Music
- 2014. Songs of Exile. Volume I. Available Forms Music
