= Armenian jewelry =

Jewelry from Armenia

Armenian jewelry is a part of Armenian culture, decorative arts, and includes the nation's historical style, tastes and aesthetics. Jewelry was used by Armenian men and women since ancient times and mostly earrings, necklaces, hairpins, rings, chains and pins were worn. Jewelry had not only practical and aesthetic value, but also contained symbolic meaning and messaging. The shapes, materials and patterns of the jewelry were connected to the folk beliefs and national lifestyles.

== Historical background ==
Armenian jewelry dates back to the Urartian period (9th-8th centuries BC). It was produced as Urartu's civilization developed in the Bronze and Iron Ages of ancient Armenia. On the Adilcevaz-Teisheba relief jewelry artifacts of Urartian origin were found, such as bronze statues, various belts and votive plaques. Those were the evidence of socio-economic development and class differences in the Urartian society.

Besides the written sources, chest jewelry on clay salt containers and ornaments that were carved on stone idols from the 19th to the 20th centuries were discovered during the archaeological excavations in Dvin. In addition to this, archaeologists revealed that the tools, products and manufacturing techniques used in jewelry-making were in use in Armenia during the Bronze age. Jewelries were passed down from father to son as a heritage, and each social group had the right to wear a specific type of jewelry. Even though there were some limitations of what types of jewelry could be worn by a specific social group, Armenian people of all classes, including kings, queens, soldiers, nobles, adults and children, wore jewelry.

== The significance of materials ==
Armenia's plateaus were plentiful in metal ores and were one of the first regions in the world to practice metallurgy with bronze and iron. The church, the royalty and the wealthy people wore gold and silver which were representative of a luxurious lifestyle. The materials from which jewelry is made have an ideological value. Armenians in the Middle Ages believed that the seven metals represented the seven planets and seven days of the week. It was the hierarchy of metals developed in ancient times, where gold was portrayed as the Sun and Sunday, and silver was regarded as the Moon and Monday. This was also portrayed in the "Book of Judgment" by Mkhitar Gosh, where gold mines were made by and belonged to the king only, and the silver mines to the queen. The significance of these metals was carried to the Middle ages along with their association with the cosmic (sun, moon), social (king, queen) and temporal (Sunday, Monday) hierarchy.

Over the centuries, Armenian jewelry has been made using stones such as agate, sardius, turquoise, rock crystal, chalcedony, sardonyx, amethyst, garnet, ruby, emerald, sapphire, diamond, adamant, as well as pearl, amber, coral, ivory, selected types of wood, etc. The stones in Armenian culture also had ideological value. It was believed that precious and semi-precious stones, such as, amber, pearl and coral had the power to cure diverse diseases, bring luck and prosperity and protect from the evil eye. The colors also had their specific meaning, mostly in case of the colored artificial beads used in making jewelry.

In Van, Constantinople and other cities in the 18th and especially 19th centuries, huge amounts of silver belts, earrings, bracelets and buckles were discovered belonging to the filigree work. At that period the most used technique in jewelry making was niello18 where the black alloy was melted to create a engraved design on metal, mainly gold and silver surfaces.

== Jewelry types and styles ==
National jewelry was a part of Armenian national clothing and the overall style was not complete without the necklaces, bracelets, rings, breastplates that were attached to the clothes. Similar to national clothing, taraz, jewelry had different usage and style in diverse regions. For instance, the gold jewelry dating back to 10th to 13th centuries found in Dvin is a proof of jewelry that was manufactured, used and traded there. Some styles of the jewelry were influenced by the three main cultural countries of that time, Byzantium, Fatimid Egypt and Syria, and Iran, connecting Dvin to the international trade circle. Several examples of jewelry found in Dvin are presented below.

=== Fringed Necklace ===
"Dvin, 10th–11th century

Gold sheet and wire

L. 13¼ in. (33.6 cm)

History Museum of Armenia, Yerevan (1641-63)"

This type of necklaces included a specific style made from small sheets of gold and thin wire which carved the double loop-in-loop braid like chains with chain pendants.

=== Crescent-shaped earrings ===
"Dvin, 11th–12th century

Gold sheet, turquoise, and pearls

1 1/2 × 1 1/8 in. (3.8 × 2.8 cm)

History Museum of Armenia, Yerevan (1429a, b)"

These kinds of earrings were manufactured with the help of thick gold using spiral terminals that attached the pin for the ear wire and loops for the hinge. Although the current preserved version of the earring misses a part, back then it had three suspension rings used for a pendant pearl. Each crescent has a huge turquoise stone in a deep collar mount and at the top part an attached pearl can be seen. To not spoil the jewelry and leave traces special techniques were applied while soldering the mount and the rings on the surface. For that one turquoise is smaller than the other one and the part where the mount is being opened is carefully adjusted with special tools.

=== Crescent-shaped earrings ===
"Dvin, 11th century

Gold sheet, plain wire, and twisted wire (rope)

3 1/8 × 3/4 in. (7.9 × 1.9 cm)

History Museum of Armenia, Yerevan (1285, 1379)"

The earrings were discovered during the 1936s and are considered as a part of Aygestan Hoard. They have crescent shape with filigree decoration style and include semicircular panels which are framed by double ropes and are packed with plain flattered wires that have heart shapes. The upper band of the earrings are divided using a double rope and they have the resemblance of the figure eight with looped plain wire ends.

=== Bracelet ===
"Dvin, 11th century

Gold sheet, twisted wire (rope), and granulation

Diam. 2 7/8 in. (7.3 cm)

History Museum of Armenia, Yerevan (1375)"

Like the crescent-shaped earrings, this type of bracelet was also discovered during 1936 as a part of Aygestan Hoard. The bracelet has zoomorphic terminals with twisted tubular hoop bounds using rope.
