= Komitas =

Armenian composer and priest (1869–1935)

Komitas Vardapet
- Կոմիտաս
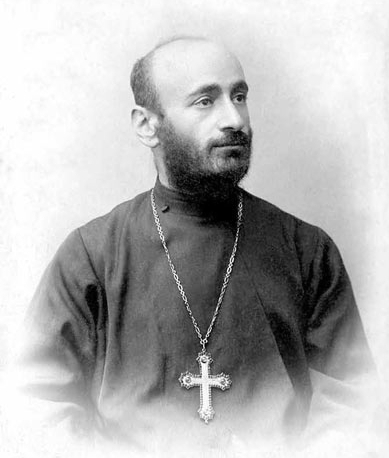
- Komitas in 1901 or 1902
- Born: Soghomon Soghomonian; 8 October [O.S. 26 September] 1869; Kütahya, Ottoman Empire
- Died: 22 October 1935 (aged 66); Paris, France
- Resting place: Komitas Pantheon
- Education: Gevorgian Seminary; Frederick William University
- Occupations: Musicologist, composer, choirmaster
- Years active: 1891–1915
- Known for: Komitas Quartet
- Website: komitasmuseum.am

Signature
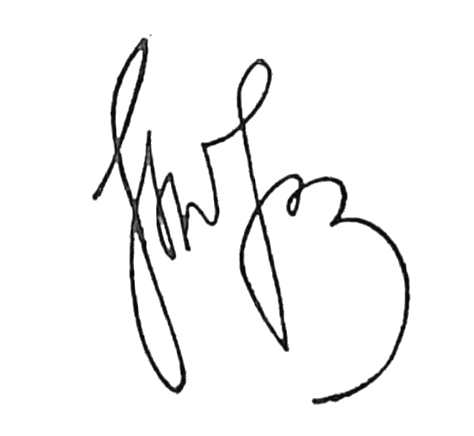

Komitas singing Mokats Mirza.

Soghomon Soghomonian, (Note: Սողոմոն Սողոմոնեան in classical orthography and Սողոմոն Սողոմոնյան in reformed orthography. Sometimes anglicized as Solomon Solomonian.) ordained and commonly known as Komitas (Note: He is widely known as simply Komitas (transliterated as Gomidas from Western Armenian). His church rank, Vardapet, is sometimes used alongside: Komitas Vardapet (Կոմիտաս Վարդապետ), Gomidas Vartabed in Western Armenian. In the early 1900s, and as late as 1908, he signed his name as Soghomon Gevorgian (Kevorkian or Keworkian), after the Gevorgian Seminary.) (Armenian: Կոմիտաս; 8 October [O.S. 26 September] 1869 – 22 October 1935), was an Ottoman-Armenian priest, musicologist, composer, arranger, singer, and choirmaster, who is considered the founder of the Armenian national school of music. He is recognized as one of the pioneers of ethnomusicology.

Orphaned at a young age, Komitas was taken to Etchmiadzin, Armenia's religious center, where he received education at the Gevorgian Seminary. Following his ordination as vardapet (celibate priest) in 1895, he studied music at the Frederick William University in Berlin. He thereafter "used his Western training to build a national tradition". He collected and transcribed over 3,000 pieces of Armenian folk music, more than half of which were subsequently lost with only around 1,200 now extant. Besides Armenian folk songs, he also showed interest in other cultures and in 1903 published the first-ever collection of Kurdish folk songs titled Kurdish melodies. His choir presented Armenian music in many European cities, earning the praise of Claude Debussy, among others. Komitas settled in Constantinople in 1910 to escape mistreatment by ultra-conservative clergymen at Etchmiadzin and to introduce Armenian folk music to wider audiences. He was widely embraced by Armenian communities, while Arshag Chobanian called him the "savior of Armenian music".

During the Armenian genocide—along with hundreds of other Armenian intellectuals—Komitas was arrested and deported to a prison camp in April 1915 by the Ottoman government. He was soon released under unclear circumstances and, having witnessed indiscriminate cruelty and relentless massacres of other Armenians by the Ottoman Turks, experienced a mental breakdown and developed a severe case of post-traumatic stress disorder. The widespread hostile environment in Constantinople and reports of mass-scale Armenian death marches and massacres that reached him further worsened his fragile mental state. He was placed in a Turkish military-operated hospital until 1919 and then transferred to psychiatric hospitals in Paris, where he spent the last years of his life in agony. Komitas is widely seen as a martyr of the genocide and has been depicted as one of the main symbols of the Armenian Genocide in art. Collection of Works of the Composer Komitas Vardapet is included to UNESCO Memory of the World Register.

== Biography ==
=== Childhood (1869–81) ===
Komitas was born Soghomon Soghomonian in Kütahya, Hüdavendigâr (Bursa) Vilayet, Ottoman Empire on 26 September (8 October in New Style) 1869 to Armenian parents Kevork and Takuhi. According to his autobiographical sketches, his parents' ancestors moved to western Anatolia from the Tsghna village in Nakhichevan's Goghtn province at the turn of the century. His family only spoke Turkish due to restrictions by the Ottoman government. Soghomon was their only child. He was baptized three days after his birth. His mother was originally from Bursa and was sixteen at the time of his birth. People who knew her described her as melancholic, while his father was a cheerful person; but both were interested in music. She died in March 1870, just six months after giving birth to him. Her death left deep scars on him, whose earliest poems were devoted to her. Thereafter, according to different sources, either his father's sister-in-law or his paternal grandmother, Mariam, looked after him.

In 1880, four years after he finished primary school in Kütahya, Soghomon was sent by his father to Bursa to continue his education. He possibly stayed with his maternal grandparents who lived in the city. He was sent back to Kütahya four months later, following the death of his father who had become an alcoholic. Although Soghomon was adopted by his paternal uncle Harutyun, his "familiar and social structure had collapsed." A childhood friend described him as "virtually homeless." He was completely deprived of paternal care and was "placed in circumstances that made him vulnerable to the mental illness he suffered later in life".

=== Etchmiadzin (1881–95) ===
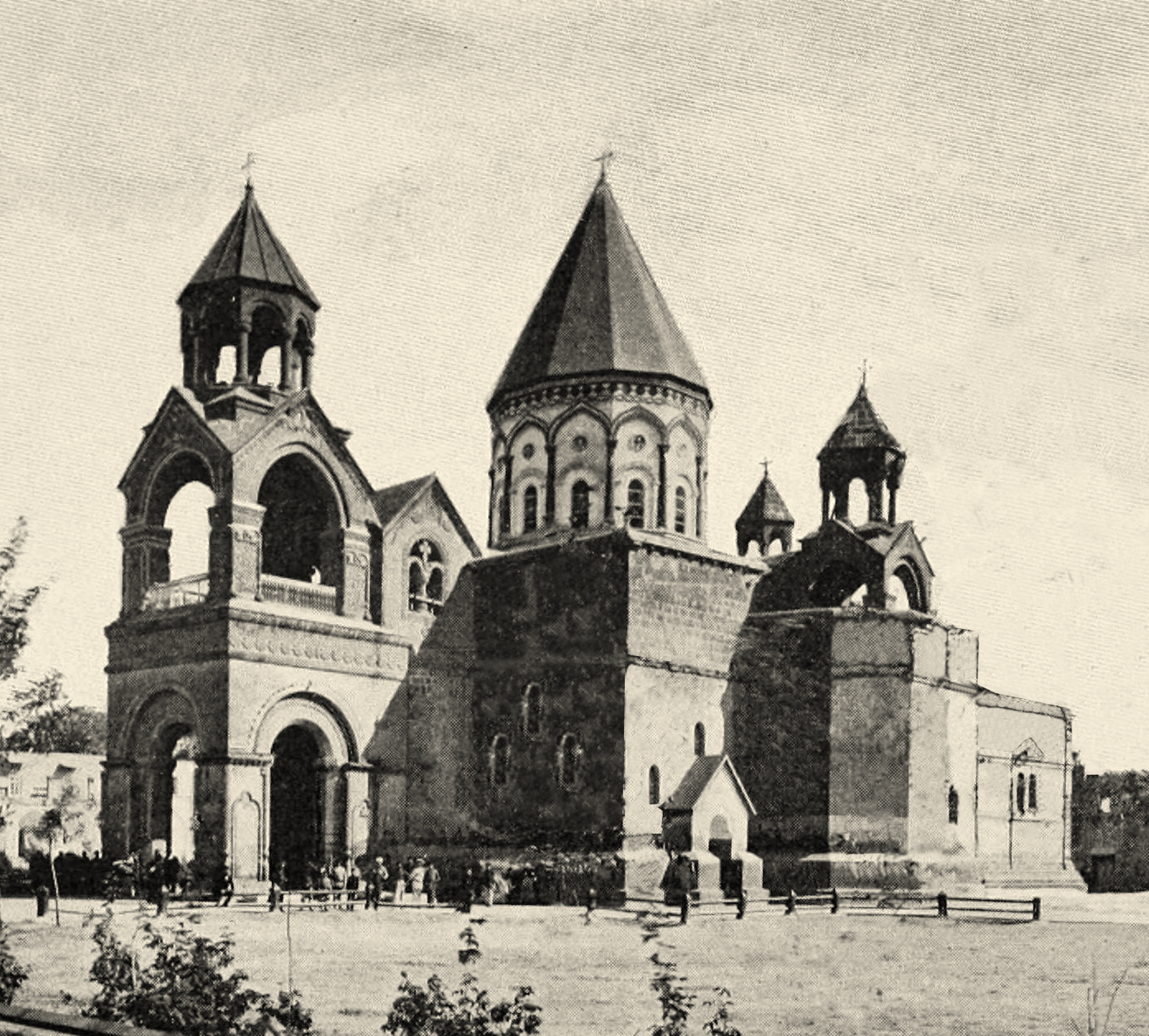
Etchmiadzin Cathedral (1890s)

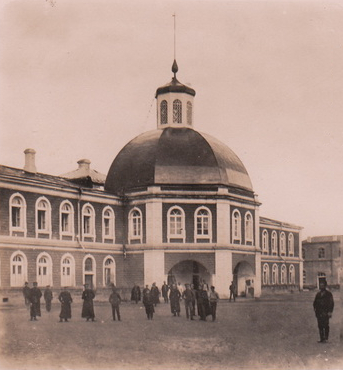
Gevorgian Seminary (1910)

His life took a radical turn in the fall of 1881. In September, the twelve-year-old Soghomon was taken to Etchmiadzin by Kevork Vartabed Tertsagyan, the local Armenian bishop, who was asked by the Holy See of Etchmiadzin to find an orphan boy with good singing voice to be enrolled in the prestigious Gevorgian Seminary. On 1 October 1881, Komitas was introduced to Catholicos Gevorg IV, who was disappointed with his lack of knowledge of Armenian, but was so impressed with his singing talent that he often asked Komitas to sing for visitors. After an unfortunate childhood, Komitas found "emotional and intellectual stability" in the seminary.

Between 1881 and 1910, Komitas was mainly based in Etchmiadzin, although he did spend a significant time in Europe. During his first year at the seminary, Komitas learned the Armenian music notation (khaz) system based on ancient neumes developed earlier in the 19th century by Hampartsoum Limondjian and his students. He gradually discovered a great passion for music and started writing down songs sung by Armenian villagers near Etchmiadzin, who affectionately called him "Notaji Vardapet", meaning "the note-taking priest".

In the early 1890s, Komitas made his first attempts to write music for the poems of Khachatur Abovian, Hovhannes Hovhannisyan, Avetik Isahakyan (his younger classmate) and others. In 1891, the Ararat magazine (the Holy See's official newspaper) published his "National Anthem" (Ազգային Օրհներգ, lyrics by seminary student A. Tashjian) for polyphonic choirs. He finished the seminary in 1893, became a music teacher and was appointed the choirmaster of the Etchmiadzin Cathedral, Armenia's mother church.

His earliest major influence was Kristapor Kara-Murza, who taught at the seminary only one year, in 1892. Kara-Murza composed and organized performances of European music for schoolchildren throughout Armenian-populated areas for educational purposes. And although Komitas criticized his works as not authentically Armenian, Kara-Murza was the person who taught Komitas the polyphonic choral structure around which he built his musical achievements.

In 1894, Soghomon was ordained hieromonk (կուսակրոն աբեղա) and given the name of the 7th-century poet and musician Catholicos Komitas. In February 1895, he was ordained vardapet (celibate priest) and became thereafter known as Komitas Vardapet. In the same year, his first collection of transcribed folk music, "The Songs of Agn" (Շար Ակնա ժողովրդական երգերի), was completed, which included 25 pieces of love songs, wedding tunes, lullabies and dances. It was disapproved by a reactionary and ultraconservative faction of the Etchmiadzin clergy, who harassed and sarcastically referred to Komitas as "the love-singing priest". Rumors of alleged sexual misconduct were spread, leading Komitas into experiencing an identity crisis.

=== Tiflis and Berlin (1895–1899) ===
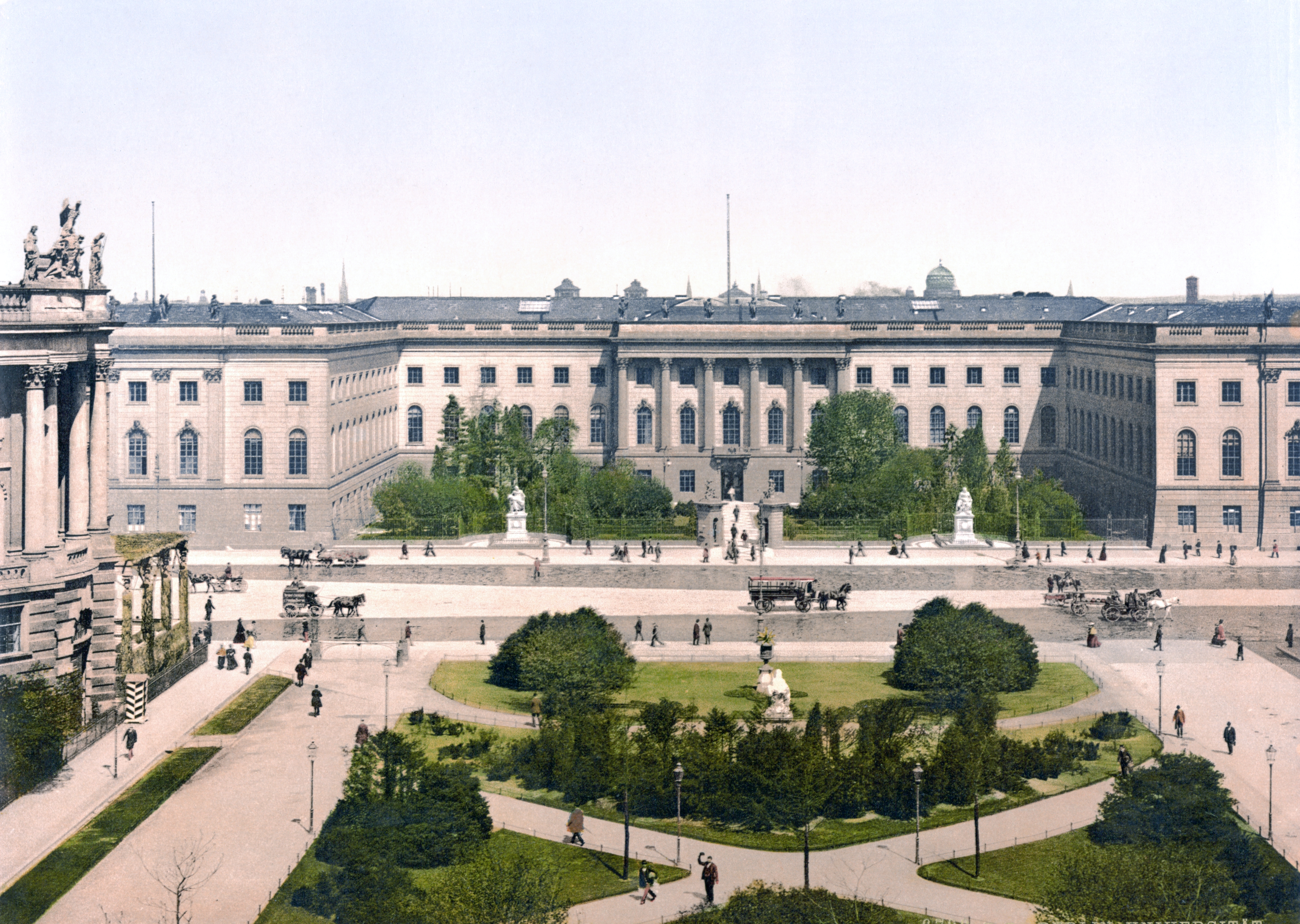
Frederick William University, c. 1900

In October 1895, Komitas left Etchmiadzin for Tiflis to study harmony under composer Makar Yekmalyan, whose polyphonic rendering of Armenian liturgy is the most widely used and who became one of Komitas's most influential teachers. At the time, Tiflis was the most suitable option for Komitas as it was both relatively close to the Armenian lands and had a rectory, where he could stay. The six months Komitas spent with Yekmalyan deepened his understanding of European harmonic principles and laid the groundwork for his further education in European conservatories. As Komitas prepared for entrance exams, the wealthy Armenian oil explorer Alexander Mantashev agreed to pay 1,800 rubles for his three-year tuition at the request of Catholicos Mkrtich Khrimian.

Komitas arrived in Berlin in early June 1896 without having been accepted by any university. A group of Armenian friends helped him to find an apartment. He initially took private lessons with Richard Schmidt for a few months. Afterwards, he was accepted into the prestigious Frederick William University. With little left of Mantashev's money after paying for rent and supplies, Komitas cut on food, having one or no meal each day. However, this did not distract him from education and he effectively absorbed the erudition of highly accomplished German teachers. Among them were 18th–19th century folk music specialist Heinrich Bellermann, Max Friedlaender, Oskar Fleischer. Fleischer in May 1899 established the Berlin chapter of the International Musical Society (German: Internationalen Musikgesellschaft), of which Komitas became an active member. He lectured there on Armenian folk music and suggested that it dated back to pre-Christian, pagan times. His studies at the university ended in July 1899.

=== Main period of work (1899–1910) ===
Upon his return to Etchmiadzin in September 1899, Komitas resumed teaching and composing. He assembled and trained a large polyphonic choir based on his acquired knowledge. Until 1906, he directed the Gevorgian Seminary choir. It was in this period when he completed "most of the theoretical and research papers that earned him his place among the pioneers of ethnomusicology." Komitas spent summers in Armenian countryside, developing a unique relationship with villagers. He thus took the scholarly task of transcribing and preserving rural Armenian songs. In the fall of 1903 after three years of collection and transcription, Komitas published a collection of 50 folks songs titled "One Thousand and One Songs" (Հազար ու մի խաղ). Lyricist Manuk Abeghian helped him compile the folk pieces. The same collection was reprinted in 1904, while in 1905 a further 50 songs were published.

=== Constantinople (1910–15) ===
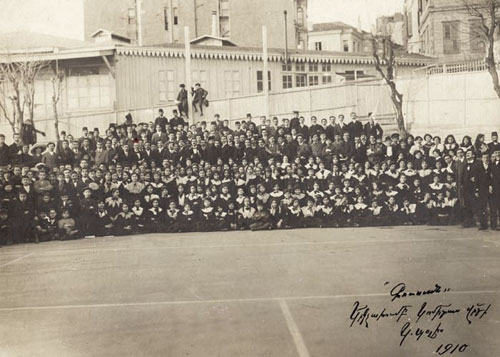
Komitas's "Gusan" choir in 1910

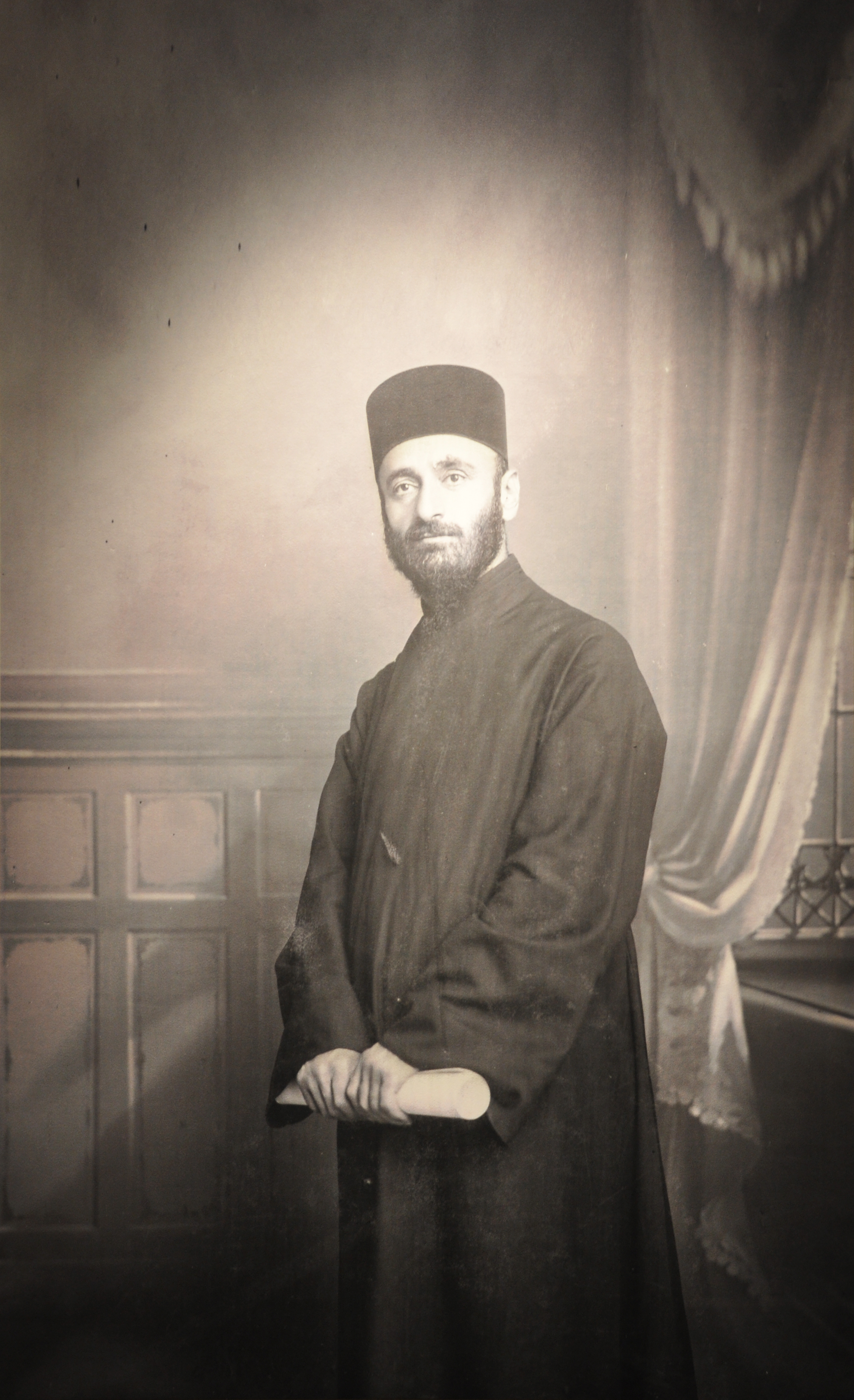
Komitas at Cairo in 1911

"Seeking to bring appreciation of Armenian music to a wider audience", Komitas moved to Constantinople (modern-day Istanbul), the Ottoman imperial capital in 1910. "There he trained a group of students in Armenian melody and formed a choir that toured Armenian communities and gave performances of the folk compositions that Komitas had arranged for four-part choir." He founded the Gusan choir (Hay gusan since 1912), made up of tens of musicians. With the aim to produce professional musicians, he taught musicology to Barsegh Kanachyan, Mihran Tumacan, Vagharshak Srvandztian and others.

=== Deportation and final years (1915–35) ===
On 24 April 1915, the day when the Armenian genocide officially began, he was arrested and put on a train the next day together with 180 other Armenian notables and sent to the city of Çankırı in northern Central Anatolia, at a distance of some 480 kilometres (300 mi). The Turkish nationalist poet Mehmet Emin Yurdakul, the writer Halide Edip and U.S. ambassador Henry Morgenthau intervened with the government, and by special orders from Talat Pasha, Komitas was dispatched back to the capital alongside eight other Armenians who had been deported. Grigoris Balakian's Armenian Golgotha offers details of his deportation, during which Komitas suffered tremendously and was afflicted with traumatic neurosis. In one passage Balakian recounts how:

The more we moved away from civilization, the more agitated were our souls and the more our minds were racked with fear. We thought we saw bandits behind every boulder; the hammocks or cradles hanging from every tree seemed like gallows ropes. The expert on Armenian songs, the peerless archimandrite Father Komitas, who was in our carriage, seemed mentally unstable. He thought the trees were bandits on the attack and continually hid his head under the hem of my overcoat, like a fearful partridge. He begged me to say a blessing for him ["The Savior"] in the hope that it would calm him.

In the autumn of 1916, he was taken to a hospital in Constantinople, Hôpital de la paix, and then moved to Paris in 1919, where he died in a psychiatric clinic in Villejuif in 1935. Next year, his ashes were transferred to Yerevan and buried in the Pantheon that was named after him.

== Legacy ==
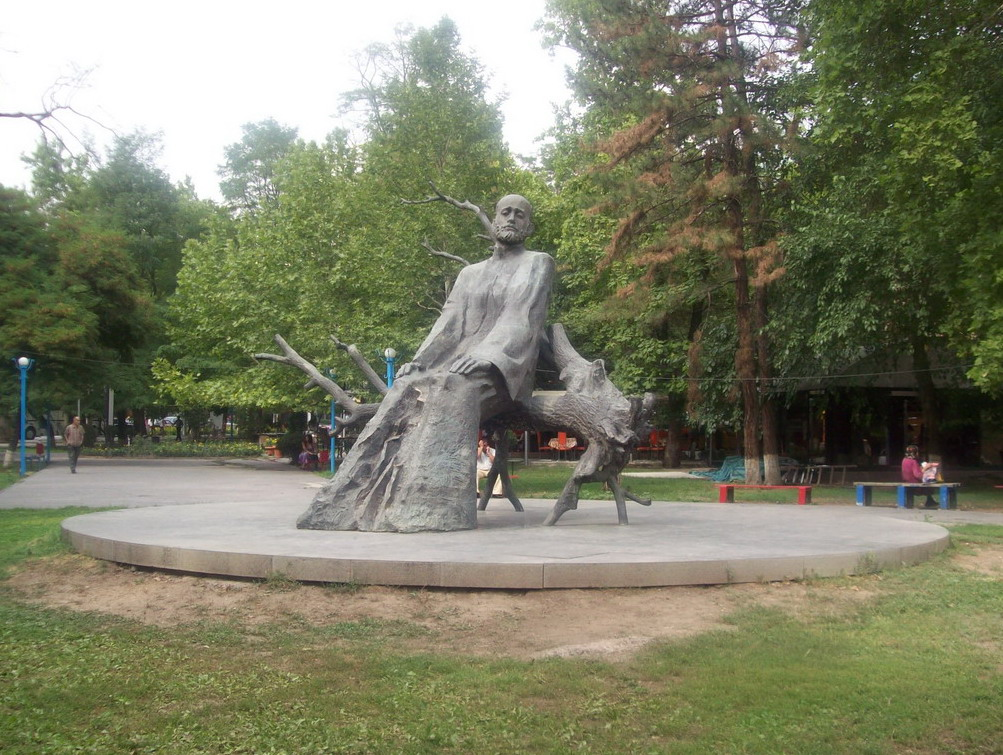
Statue of Komitas in Yerevan

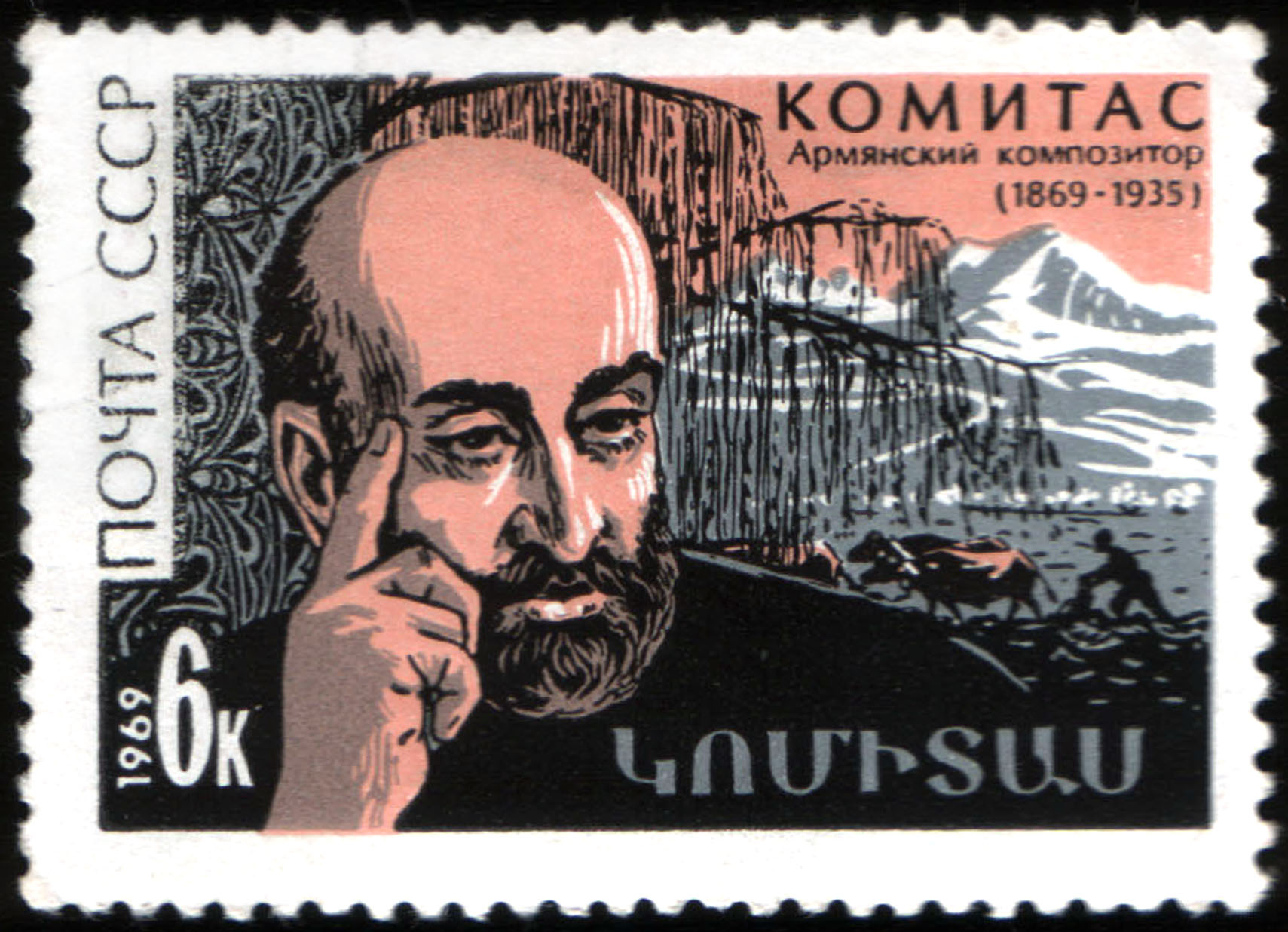
Komitas on a 1969 Soviet Union postage stamp

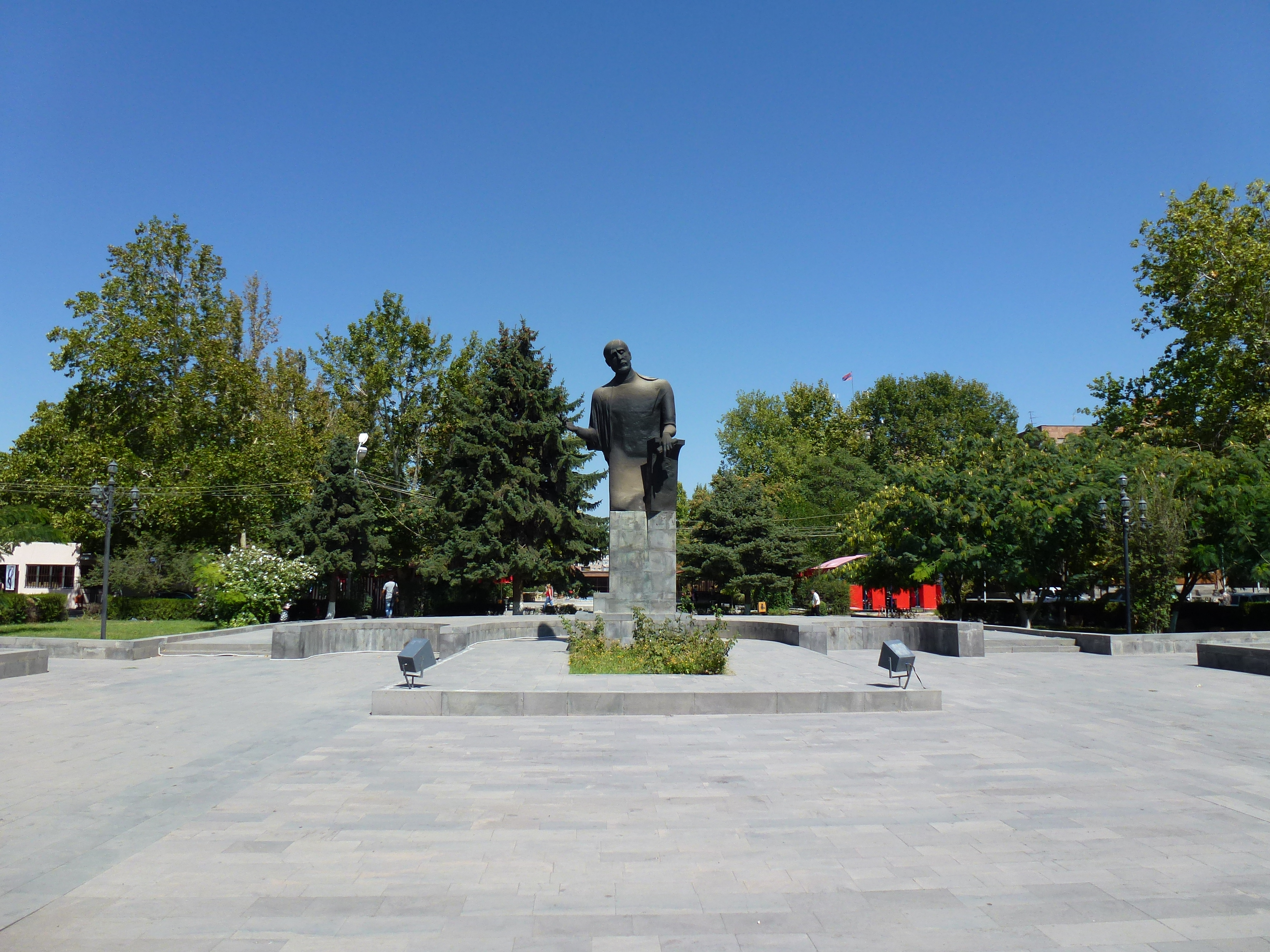
Statue of Komitas in Vagharshapat

In the 1950s, his manuscripts were also transferred from Paris to Yerevan.

Badarak was first printed in 1933 in Paris and first recorded onto a digital media in 1988 in Yerevan. In collecting and publishing so many folk songs, he saved the cultural heritage of Western Armenia that otherwise would have disappeared because of the genocide. His works have been published in Armenia in a thoroughly annotated edition by Robert Atayan. Lately, nine songs on German poetry, written during his stay in Berlin, have been excavated from the archives in Yerevan and interpreted by soprano Hasmik Papian.

The Yerevan State Musical Conservatory is named after Komitas. There also exists a world-renowned string quartet named after Komitas.

On 6 July 2008, on the occasion of Quebec City's 400th anniversary celebration, a bronze bust of Komitas was unveiled near the Quebec National Assembly (provincial legislature, Auteuil street) in recognition of his great input to music in general and to Armenian popular and liturgical music in particular. Previously, a granite and bronze statue of Komitas was erected in Detroit in 1981 in honor of the great composer and as a reminder of the tragedy of the Armenian Genocide.

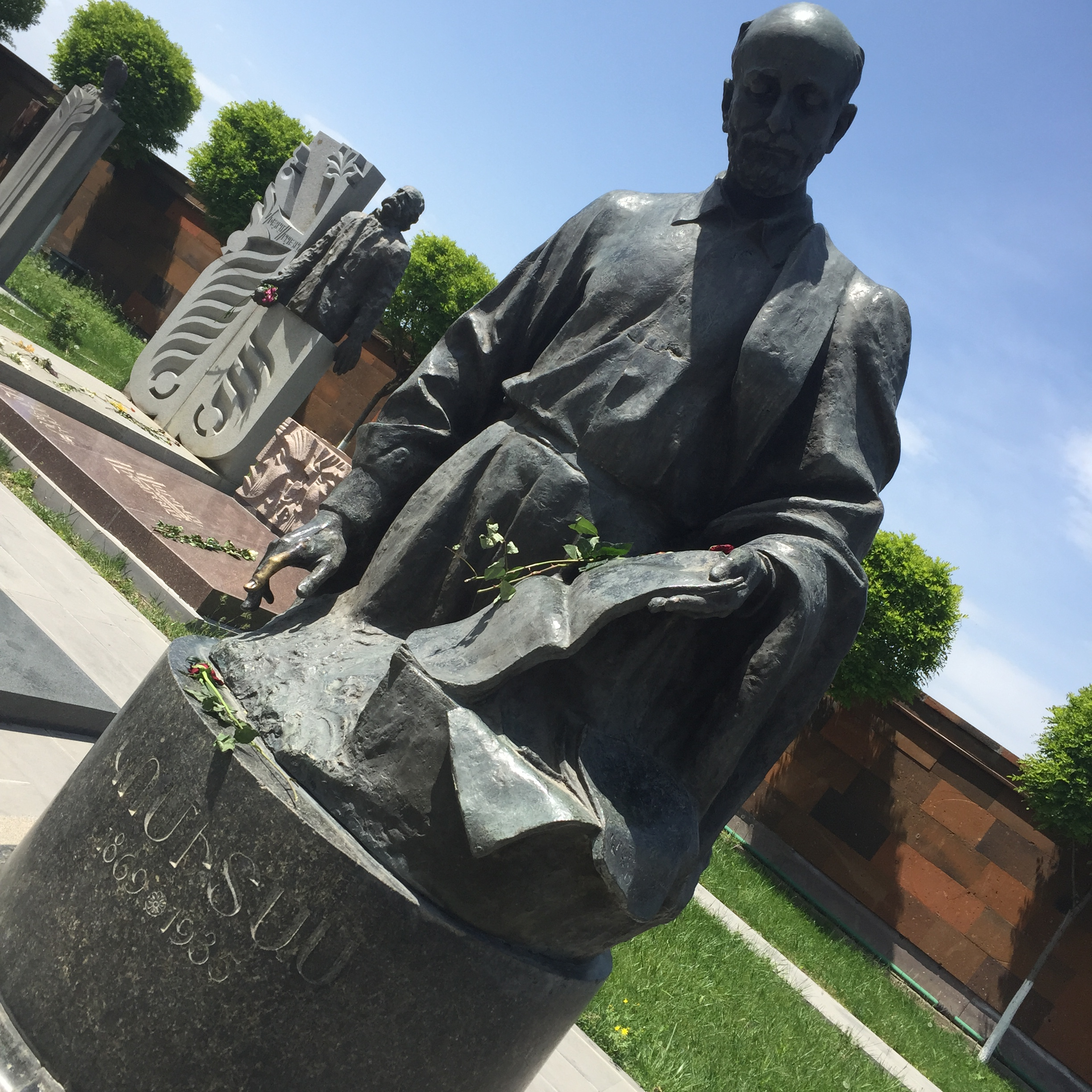
Komitas' tombstone in Yerevan's Komitas Pantheon

In September 2008, the CD Gomidas Songs, sung by Isabel Bayrakdarian and accompanied by the Chamber Players of the Armenian Philharmonic and pianist Serouj Kradjian, was released on the Nonesuch label. This CD was nominated for a Grammy Award in the Best Vocal Recording category. A major North American tour by Ms. Bayrakdarian in October 2008 featured the music of Komitas, with concerts in Toronto, San Francisco, Orange County, Los Angeles, Vancouver, Boston and New York's Carnegie Hall. She was accompanied by the Manitoba Chamber Orchestra conducted by Anne Manson, and pianist Serouj Kradjian. The Remembrance Tour was dedicated to victims of all genocides and sponsored by the International Institute for Genocide and Human Rights Studies (a division of the Zoryan Institute).

The complete piano works of Komitas are recorded by Şahan Arzruni on Kalan Müzik label in 2010 and remain the definitive interpretation of these compositions. Among the other performers of his music are Evgeny Kissin and Grigory Sokolov.

Since 2018 Komitas appears on the 10000 Armenian dram banknote.

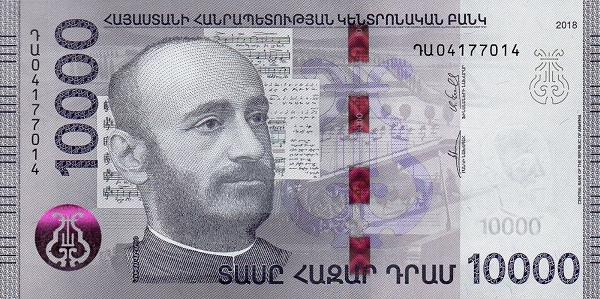
Komitas on the 2018 10000 Dram banknote

In 2019, the Gurdjief Ensemble debuted in New York City performing Komitas's folk songs on traditional instruments.

Modern performers, like Rewşan Çeliker and Pervin Chakar, reinterpret and promote his collected works, ensuring their continued relevance.

=== Landmarks ===
The following landmarks in Armenia have been named after him:

- The central square of Vagharshapat.
- The Yerevan State Musical Conservatory.
- Komitas Avenue, the main thoroughfare of Yerevan's Arabkir District.
- The writers' and poets' pantheon.
- The Komitas Museum adjacent to the Pantheon.

== Selected works, editions and recordings ==
- The Music of Komitas – double LP released on the centenary of Komitas's birth. KCC, 1970.
- The Voice of Komitas Vardapet, Komitas Vardapet – archival performances recorded in 1908–1912, featuring Komitas on vocals and piano, and Armenak Shahmuradyan on vocals. Traditional Crossroads, 1995.
- Gomidas – Songs, Isabel Bayrakdarian, Serouj Kradjian (arrangements and piano), chamber players of the Armenian Philharmonic Orchestra, conducted by Eduard Topchjan. Nonesuch, 2005
- Komitas – Complete Works for Piano, Şahan Arzruni. Kalan, 2012
- Hommage à Komitas – audio CD containing 9 songs on German poetry (world premiere, first recording) and 26 songs in Armenian, Hasmik Papian (soprano) and Vardan Mamikonian (piano). Recorded at Bavaria Studio, Munich, in July 2005. Audite (Germany) in cooperation with Bayerischer Rundfunk, 2006.
- Music by Komitas – audio CD featuring instrumental arrangements performed by the Gurdjieff Ensemble, directed and arranged by Levon Eskenian (with notes). ECM Records, 2015.
- My Armenia – audio CD dedicated to the 100th Commemoration of the Armenian Genocide, My Armenia offers a very personal, touching and brilliant tribute to Armenian music by Sergey Khachatryan and Lusine Khachatryan. Naïve Records, 2015.
- Komitas Vardapet – Six Dances, Keiko Shichijo (piano). Makkum Records, 2016.
- Komitas: Songs (arranged for piano by Villy Sargsyan), CD by Yulia Ayrapetyan [piano] under the label Grand Piano (GP895)

== Works on Komitas ==
- Kuyumjian, Rita Soulahian (2001). Archaeology of Madness: Komitas, Portrait of an Armenian Icon. Princeton, NJ: Gomidas Institute. ISBN 9781903656105.
- Tahmizian, Nikoġos Kirakosi (1994). Komitasẹ ev hay žoġovowrdi eražštakan žaṙangowt'iwnẹ [Komitas and the Musical Legacy of the Armenian Nation] (in Armenian). Pasadena, California: Drazark Hrat.

== Films ==
- Komitas, 1988, director: Don Askarian, actor: Samvel Ovasapian
- Songs of Solomon, 2019, directed by Arman Nshanian, Komitas depicted by Samvel Tadevosyan
