= Mamikonian (disambiguation) =

Mamikonian (Armenian: Մամիկոնեան) is a noble family which dominated Armenian politics between the 4th and 8th century.

Mamikonian or Mamikonyan or Mamigonian may also refer to:

== Mamikonian dynasty ==
- John Mamikonean (Hovhannes Mamikonian), 7th-century author and historian
- Manuel Mamikonian, 4th-century Armenian ruler, military leader, and sparapet
- Mushegh I Mamikonian, 4th-century Armenian military leader and sparapet
- Vardan Mamikonian (also known as Saint Vardan; 393–451), Armenian military leader, martyr and saint of the Armenian Church
- Vassak Mamikonian, 4th-century Armenian military leader, sparapet for King Arsaces II (Arshak II)

== Other people ==
- Saint Shushanik (born Vardeni Mamikonian c. 440–475), early medieval Christian martyr of Armenian origin
- Sophie Audouin-Mamikonian (born 1961), French-Armenian writer and author
- Vardan Mamikonian (musician), French-Armenian pianist
