= Armenag Shah-Mouradian =

Armenian opera singer (1878–1939)

Armenak Shahmuradyan (also spelled Chah-Mouradian or Shah-Mouradian, April 7, 1878, Muş, Ottoman Empire – September 14, 1939, Paris), also known as the bard of Daron, was an Armenian operatic tenor. He is one of the outstanding representatives of Komitas's school. Shahmuradyan is well known for the performance of "Krunk", "Antuni", "Garun a", "Hayastan", "Kilikia" and other Armenian songs.

== Biography ==
Shahmuradyan studied at Gevorgian Seminary of Echmiadzin where he met Komitas. In 1910 he finished the Paris Conservatory of Music, where he attended the classes of Pauline Viardot. He debuted at Grand Opera with Faust in 1910. He gave concerts in many countries including USA, Britain, Belgium, Iran, India, etc. Since 1930 Shahmuradyan lived in Paris and died in a psychiatric clinic in 1939. William Saroyan dedicated a poem to him. In his "Obituaries" Saroyan wrote: "Shah-Mouradian was "one of the truly great tenor-baritones of all time, somewhat like John McCormack, a star in Paris and New York, and around the world in opera".

== Discography ==
- The Voice of Komitas Vardapet (recorded in 1912 in Paris). Traditional Crossroards, 1995, USA.
- The Voice of Armenia. Vol 1. SomeWax Recordings, 2004
