= Catherine Manoukian =

Canadian violinist (born 1981)

Catherine Manoukian (born June 2, 1981) is an Armenian-Canadian violinist.

== Biography ==
=== Background and early life ===
Catherine Manoukian was born in Toronto. Her parents were professional violinists and met at the Royal Conservatory of Brussels, where her father studied with Carlo Van Neste and her mother studied with Arthur Grumiaux.

=== Career ===
Catherine Manoukian's professional career started when she won grand prize at the Canadian Music Competition at the age of twelve. The same year, she made her orchestral debut with the Vancouver Symphony Orchestra playing Paganini's Violin Concerto No. 1. Since then, she has played with many major North American and international orchestras, like; the CBC Radio Orchestra, the Calgary Philharmonic Orchestra, the Boston Pops Orchestra, the Istanbul State Symphony Orchestra, the Tokyo Philharmonic Orchestra, the Tokyo Symphony Orchestra, the Osaka Century Orchestra, and the Armenian Philharmonic Orchestra, and has worked with such conductors as Mario Bernardi, Jukka-Pekka Saraste, Keith Lockhart, Roy Goodman, Peter Oundjian, Tomomi Nishimoto, Seikyo Kim, Eduard Topchjan, and Jonas Alber. She has played on the major stages of such cities as New York, Washington D.C., Boston, Los Angeles, Toronto, Paris, Tokyo, and Osaka, and has appeared as a chamber musician at the Aspen, Caramoor, and Newport International Festivals. She has often played novel and unusual repertoire, and recorded a CD of transcriptions for violin of Chopin's music as a teenager. Many of the transcriptions, among them the Cello Sonata, were commissioned by her.

=== Education ===
Manoukian's education history is unusual for a musician. She did not go to a music school, but trained privately as a violinist with Dorothy DeLay in New York as well as with her parents in Toronto. She also received independent lessons in core musical subjects like harmony and chamber music. This gave her the time to also pursue a non-musical education. She has an Honours Bachelor of Arts degree from the University of Toronto (with high distinction) and has done graduate-level work in philosophy (focusing on areas like epistemology and the philosophy of mind). She is now on sabbatical from the PhD programme in philosophy at the University of Toronto. Manoukian attributes her interest in philosophy to a desire since childhood to understand what musicians do, from a wider perspective than just playing allows. This has recently grown into a project to apply her philosophical thinking to theories about teaching and developing professional artists. She credits Dorothy DeLay for instilling this interest in her.

=== Instrument ===
Manoukian plays on an ex-Eugène Ysaÿe, 1861 Jean Baptiste Vuillaume violin. She uses bows by Eugene Sartory c.1910.

=== Personal life ===
Manoukian is married to conductor Stefan Solyom. They live in Toronto, Canada and have two children, and a dog.

== Discography ==
- Elegies and Rhapsodies (1998)
  Catherine Manoukian, violin
  Akira Eguchi, piano
- Chopin on Violin (1999)
  Catherine Manoukian, violin
  Akira Eguchi, piano
- Lyricism (2002)
  Catherine Manoukian, violin
  Satoshi Sando, piano
- Catherine Manoukian, Violin (2006) (Shostakovich A minor and Khatchaturian Violin Concertos)
  Catherine Manoukian, violin
  Armenian Philharmonic Orchestra, orchestra
  Eduard Topchjan, conductor

== See also ==
- List of Canadian musicians
- Canadian classical music
- List of violinists
