= Serouj Kradjian =

Canadian pianist and composer

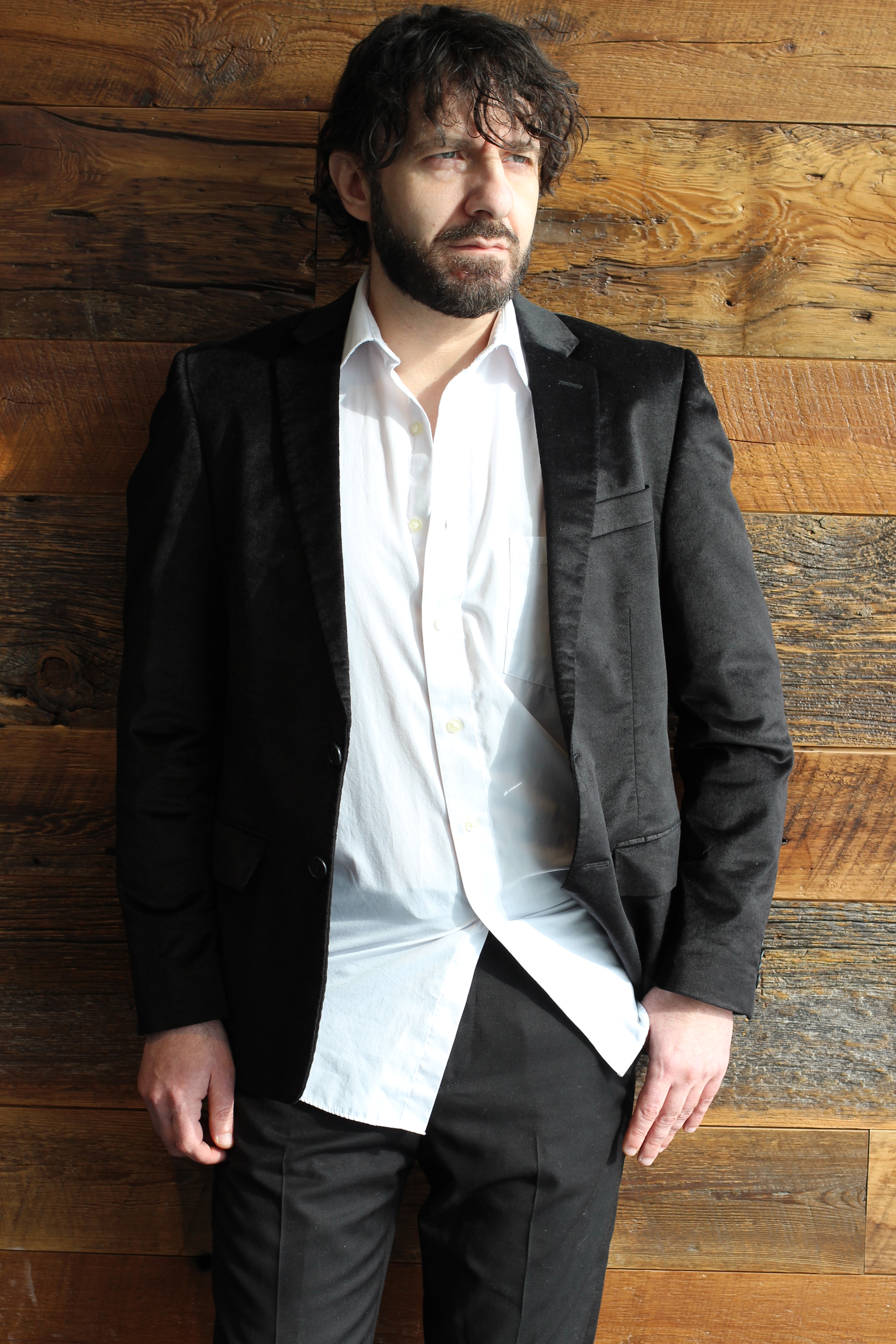
- Kradjian in Toronto, Canada
- Born: 1973 (age 52–53); Beirut, Lebanon
- Education: University of Toronto; Hochschule für Musik und Theater
- Occupations: Pianist, composer, arranger
- Years active: 1995–present
- Website: serouj.com

Serouj Kradjian (born in 1973) is a Canadian Grammy-nominated and Juno-winning pianist and composer.

== Early life and education ==
Born in 1973, at fourteen earned a scholarship to study in Vienna, and was gaining accolades by the age of seven. He later studied with Marietta Orlov at the University of Toronto's Faculty of Music, where he earned his Bachelor of Arts degree in Piano Performance in 1994. He studied with Einar Steen-Nökleberg at the Hochschule für Musik und Theater in Hanover, Germany, receiving a Solo Performance degree in 2001.

== Performances ==
Kradjian has appeared with the Toronto, Vancouver and Edmonton Symphonies, Göttingen Symphony, Russian National Orchestra, the Armenian Philharmonic and the Thailand Philharmonic under the baton of conductors such as Bramwell Tovey, Peter Oundjian, Stéphane Denève, Eduard Topchjan, Gudni Emilsson and Raffi Armenian.

Solo recitals, chamber music concerts and premieres of his compositions have taken Mr. Kradjian from all major Canadian cities, via the U.S – New York (Carnegie Hall), Boston (Jordan Hall), San Francisco, Miami, Chicago and Los Angeles – to European concert halls in London (Wigmore Hall), Paris (Salle Cortot), Munich, Salzburg, Trondheim, Lausanne, Geneva, Madrid, Barcelona and Bilbao, to the Far East in China and Japan and to Latin America (Mexico & Brazil). He has been invited to perform at festivals such as the Bergen Festival, Savannah Music Festival, Colmar Festival, Luminato Festival, Ottawa Chamberfest, Rockport Music, and the Festival Del Sole- Tuscan Sun Festival in Cortona, Italy. As a collaborative artist, Kradjian has appeared in concert with violinists Ara Malikian (a fellow Lebanese-Armenian), Cho-Liang Lin, Lara St. John, Chee-Yun and Jonathan Crow, soprano Dawn Upshaw, baritone Russell Braun, tenor Michael Schade, violist Kim Kashkashian, percussionist Jamey Haddad, the Pacifica, New Orford, Cecilia String Quartets and Camerata Pacifica.

His explorations of tango and flamenco music have led to the critically acclaimed recording project “Tango Notturno” and the North American concert tour of “Reimagining Flamenco” with acclaimed flamenco guitarist Grisha Goryachev. His latest touring project is “Convivencia” a unique program for voice and chamber music, celebrating religious and ethnic diversity and harmony. Hell’s Fury a theatre piece based on the “Hollywood Songbook” by German composer Hanns Eisler, a collaboration between Kradjian and baritone Russell Braun had its US premiere at Stanford University in 2019.

== Composer ==
Over a hundred works, composed or arranged by Kradjian have been performed by the Toronto and Vancouver Symphonies, I Musici de Montreal, Fresno Philharmonic, the Armenian Philharmonic and the Elmer Iseler Singers and Elektra Women's Chorus. He was also founder and music director of Camerata Creativa in Madrid, Spain, a chamber orchestra dedicated to the performance of contemporary works.

His concerts have been broadcast by the CBC, Radio de la Suisse Romande, Radio and TV España, the BBC, the Süddeutsche Rundfunk and NHK Japan.

Kradjian is the artistic director and pianist of Canada’s acclaimed Juno winning Amici Chamber Ensemble, responsible for innovative programming, promotion, and performance of 50+ concerts, including annual educational outreach program with the students of Claude Watson School for the Performing Arts at Earl Haig Secondary School in Toronto, Canada.

== Educator ==
Fluent in six languages (English, French, Spanish, German, Armenian & Arabic), he has taught diverse musical subjects, including piano performance, chamber music, arrangement, composition, world music interpretation, at prestigious music schools such as the Hanover University of Music, Drama and Media (Germany), Centro Superior Escuela Musica Creativa and Katarina Gurska School of Music & Foundation (both in Madrid, Spain). He is also active as a chamber music and vocal music / diction coach at Vancouver International Song Academy and Toronto’s Royal Conservatory of Music, where he also programs and conducts concerts of the Academy Chamber Orchestra, formed by the exceptionally gifted string players of The Glenn Gould School and Taylor Academy, also serving as member of the Jury at their annual Chamber Music Competition.

== Discography ==
Kradjian's discography includes traversals of Franz Liszt's Transcendental Etudes and Piano Concerti on the Warner Music Spain label. "Miniatures", an anthology of music written by Armenian composers, and Robert Schumann's three Sonatas for Violin and Piano (with Ara Malikian) are both Hänssler Classic releases. A recording featuring songs by Pauline Viardot-Garcia, was released in 2005, bringing him a 2006 Juno Award for Classical Album of the Year. He has explored and performed tango music which led to the disc "Tango Notturno" on CBC Records. His award-winning orchestral arrangements of folk songs by Gomidas – Armenia's national composer – were released as "Gomidas Songs" in 2008 on the Nonesuch label and nominated for a Grammy award. With the Amici Chamber Ensemble he has released Armenian Chamber Music in 2010, which was nominated for a Juno for Best Classical Album, & Levant, Winner of the Juno for Best Classical Album 2013. Troubadour & the Nightingale, an album of his original composition "Trobairitz Ysabella" and his arrangements of songs by Maurice Ravel and Sayat Nova, recorded on MCO Records by the Manitoba Chamber Orchestra was nominated for Juno for Best Classical Album 2014. Mother of Light, a new album of medieval sacred music, entirely arranged by Kradjian was nominated for a 2018 Juno for Best Classical Recording.

=== List of recordings ===
- Inspired By Canada / Notre Pays (2017, Marquis Classics), with Mireille Asselin & Amici Chamber Ensemble
- Mother of Light (2016, Delos Music)
- Levant (2012, ATMA Classique)
- Troubadour & the Nightingale (2012, MCO Records)
- Armenian Chamber Music (2010, ATMA Classique)
- Gomidas Songs (2008, Nonesuch) with Chamber Players of the Armenian Philharmonic conducted by Eduard Topchjan.
- Tango Notturno (2007, CBC Records)
- Twelve Transcendental Etudes: Franz Liszt (2005, Warner Music Spain)
- Pauline Viardot: Lieder Chansons Canzoni Mazurkas (Analekta, 2004)
- Piano Concerto no 1 : Franz Liszt (with Goettinger Symphonie Orchester) 2001
- Robert Schumann: Three Sonatas for Violin & Piano (Hanssler Klassik, 1998)
- Miniatures: Works by Armenian composers for violin & piano (Malkrafon, 1996)

== Awards ==
In addition to two Juno Awards and a Grammy nomination, Kradjian has won the Chalmers Grant of the Ontario Arts Council and grants from the Canada Council.
