= Mikael Avetisyan =

Armenian conductor, Professor

Mikael Avetisyan (Armenian: Միքայել Ավետիսյան; born 1966) is an Armenian conductor, Professor. He was the Artistic Director and Principal Conductor of Armenian Philharmonic Orchestra from 1998 to 1999. Doctor of Music.

== Biography ==
He studied Opera-Symphony Conducting at the Yerevan Komitas State Conservatory, and in 1991 he finished his post-graduate studies under the guidance of Ohan Durian. In 1985-1990 he also was a student of Professor Ilia Musin at St. Petersburg Conservatory. Avetisyan was the conductor at the Armenian National Radio and Television Orchestra and the Orchestra of the National Academic Theatre of Opera and Ballet.

Since 2002 Avetisyan was appointed conductor for the New Valley Symphony Orchestra.

Currently M. Avetisyan is the Artistic Director and Principal Conductor of the Glendale Philharmonic Orchestra (USA).

== Awards ==
- A diploma from the 35th Kirill Kondrashin Conductors Master classes, Netherlands,
- City of Glendale and Los Angeles County Artistic Achievement Diamond Award.
