= Ler Kamsar =

Armenian writer and satirist

- Լեռ Կամսար
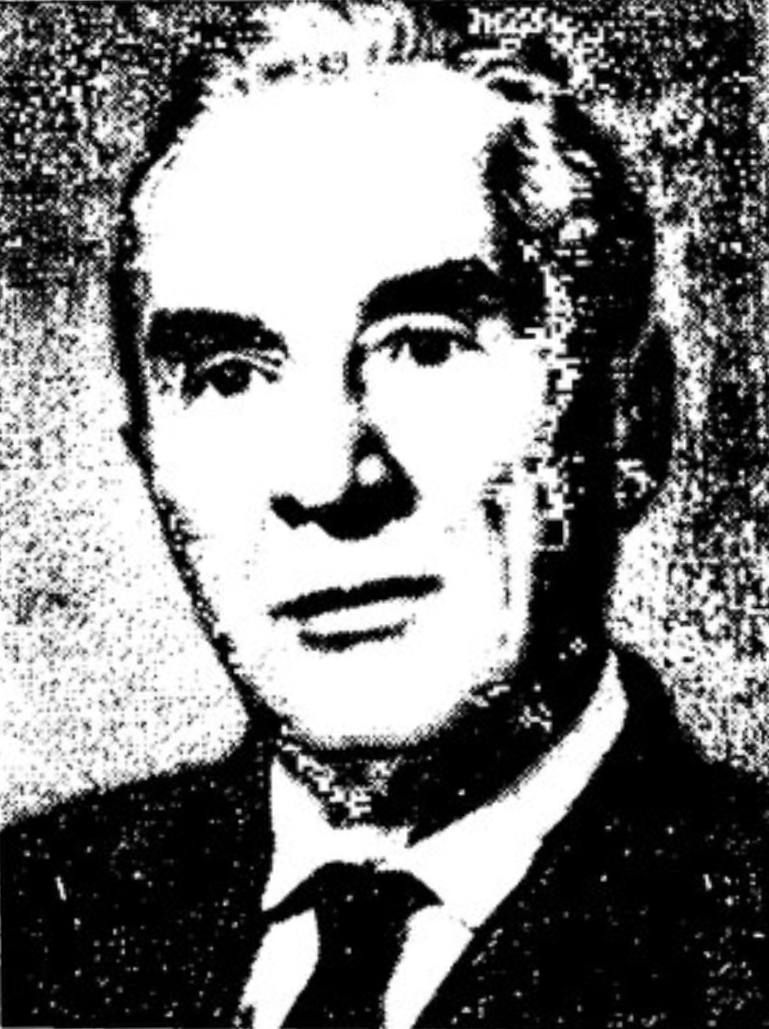
- Born: Aram Tovmaghyan; 24 October 1888; Van, Van vilayet, Ottoman Empire
- Died: 22 November 1965 (aged 77); Yerevan, Armenian SSR, Soviet Union
- Occupation: writer

Ler Kamsar (Armenian: Լեռ Կամսար, romanized: Ler’ Kamsar) was the pen name of Aram Tovmaghyan (Արամ Թովմաղյան, Aram T’ovmaghyan; 24 October 1888 – 22 November 1965), an Armenian writer and satirist. He was native of Van in the Ottoman Empire, where he began his writing career. He survived the Armenian genocide and fled to Eastern Armenia, where he worked as a satirist for various newspapers and published several works. His works satirize international and Armenian politics, religion, the clergy, and those in power, as well as aspects of everyday life, social issues, and the literary world. His criticisms of the Soviet authorities led to his repression in 1935. He spent the next twenty years in prison and exile, and he was largely prevented from publishing after he was amnestied in 1955. Many of Kamsar's works and diaries have been published since his death in 1965, although a large amount of his writings remain unpublished.

== Biography ==
Ler Kamsar was born Aram Tovmaghyan on 24 October 1888, in the city of Van in the Ottoman Empire. He first studied at the American school in his hometown, then attended the Gevorgian Seminary in Etchmiadzin. He published his first work in 1910 in the Van newspaper Ashkhatank’ (Labor)․ In 1915, during the Armenian genocide, he took part in the defense of Van․ He then fled to Yerevan, where he started writing for various newspapers in the Caucasus, sometimes under the pseudonym Ara Masyan. From 1921 to 1935, he wrote for the satirical section of Sovetakan Hayastan (Soviet Armenia), the official newspaper of Soviet Armenia.

Ler Kamsar's favorite genres were short forms of satire, such as the feuilleton, short story, satirical dialogue, and aphorism. His early works mainly satirize the policy of the great powers during and after World War I, the diplomacy surrounding the Armenian question, the activities of the Armenian political parties, religion, and the clergy. His other works satirize aspects of everyday life and social issues, as well as the literary world.

Kamsar, who always satirized those in power, did not spare the Soviet authorities in his writings. He was arrested in 1935, during the rule of Joseph Stalin. Initially imprisoned in Yerevan, he was then exiled to Vorkuta, where he remained until 1939. From 1940 to 1952, he was in exile in Basargechar (now Vardenis), near Armenia's Lake Sevan. Shortly after Stalin's death in 1953, Kamsar appealed to Anastas Mikoyan and was fully rehabilitated on 1 October 1955. However, he was prevented from publishing after his return to Yerevan; it was only just before his death that his book Mardë tanu shorerov (The man in home clothes) was accepted for publication. He died of a heart attack on 22 November 1965 in Yerevan. He had seven children, four of whom died at a young age. A street in the Kentron District of Yerevan is named after him.

Many of Kamsar's writings have been lost. He lost some of his manuscripts while fleeing from Van during the Armenian genocide․ After his arrest, materials from his archive were seized and destroyed twice by the Soviet police. Part of his manuscripts were damaged in his family home during the 1946 Yerevan flood. Nevertheless, he left behind a large number of writings, including diaries from his years in prison and exile, part of which have been published posthumously through the efforts of his granddaughter Vanuhi Tovmasyan. About half of his manuscripts remained unpublished as of April 2022.

== Published works ==
- Anvaver mer'elner Անվավեր մեռելներ [Invalid Dead] (in Armenian). Yerevan: Petakan hratarakch’ut’yun. 1924.
- Azgayin aybennaran Ազգային այբեննարան [National Abecedary] (in Armenian). Yerevan. 1926.
- Vripats arts'unk'ner Վրիպած արցունքներ [Missed Tears] (in Armenian). Yerevan: Petakan hratarakch’ut’yun. 1934.
- Grabar mardik Գրաբար մարդիկ [Classical Armenian People] (in Armenian). Yerevan: Haypethrat. 1959.
- Mardë tanu shorerov Մարդը տանու շորերով [The Man in Home Clothes] (in Armenian). Yerevan: Hayastan. 1965.
- Mihatoryak Միհատորյակ [One Volume] (in Armenian). Yerevan: Sovetakan grogh. 1980.
- Yerker Երկեր [Works] (in Armenian). Yerevan: Sovetakan grogh. 1988.
- Tpvats yev antip ejer Տպուած եւ անտիպ էջեր [Printed and Unprinted Pages] (in Armenian). Beirut: Shirak. 1988.
- Karmir orer Կարմիր օրեր [Red Days] (in Armenian). Yerevan: Nairi. 2000. (ebook edition: Yerevan: Yavruhrat, 2015.)
- Sastik komunistner Սաստիկ կոմունիստներ [Extreme Communists] (in Armenian). Yerevan: Zangak-97. 2001.
- Mahapurts oragir Մահապուրծ օրագիր [Barely Survived Diary] (in Armenian). Yerevan: Lusabats’. 2008.
- Khaghk' u khaytar'ak ashkharh Խաղք ու խայտառակ աշխարհ [Playfully Shameful World] (in Armenian). Yerevan: Hayastan. 2008. (ebook edition: Yerevan: Yavruhrat, 2013.)
- Sots'ializmi Sahara Սոցիալիզմի Սահարա [Sahara of Socialism] (in Armenian). Yerevan: HGM hratarakch’ut’yun. 2009.
- Bantis oragirë Բանտիս օրագիրը [My Prison Diary] (in Armenian). Yerevan: Amaras. 2010. (Russian edition: Moy tyuremny dnevnik Мой тюремный дневник. Yerevan: Ayastan. 2018.)
- T'aterakhagher Թատերախաղեր [Plays] (in Armenian). Yerevan: Edit’ print. 2013.
- Halots'k Հալոցք [Thaw] (in Armenian). Yerevan: Edit’ print. 2013.
- Ch'aprats orer Չապրած օրեր [Unlived Days] (in Armenian). Yerevan: P’rint’info. 2016.
- Tserukneri mankapartez Ծերուկների մանկապարտեզ [Old People's Kindergarten] (in Armenian). Yerevan: Edit’ print. 2018.
- Miaynakë Միայնակը [The Lone One] (in Armenian). Yerevan: Edit’ print. 2018.
- Mardë gortsin mejen: Ak'sorakani Gaghtni Oragir Մարդը գործին մէջէն․ Աքսորականի Գաղտնի Օրագիր [Man Through His Work: Secret Diaries of an Exile] (in Armenian). Istanbul: Aras. 2021.
- 1948: Khorhrdayin orer 1948․ Խորհրդային օրեր [1948: Soviet Days] (in Armenian). Yerevan: Edit’ print. 2021.
