= Eduard Topchjan =

Armenian conductor

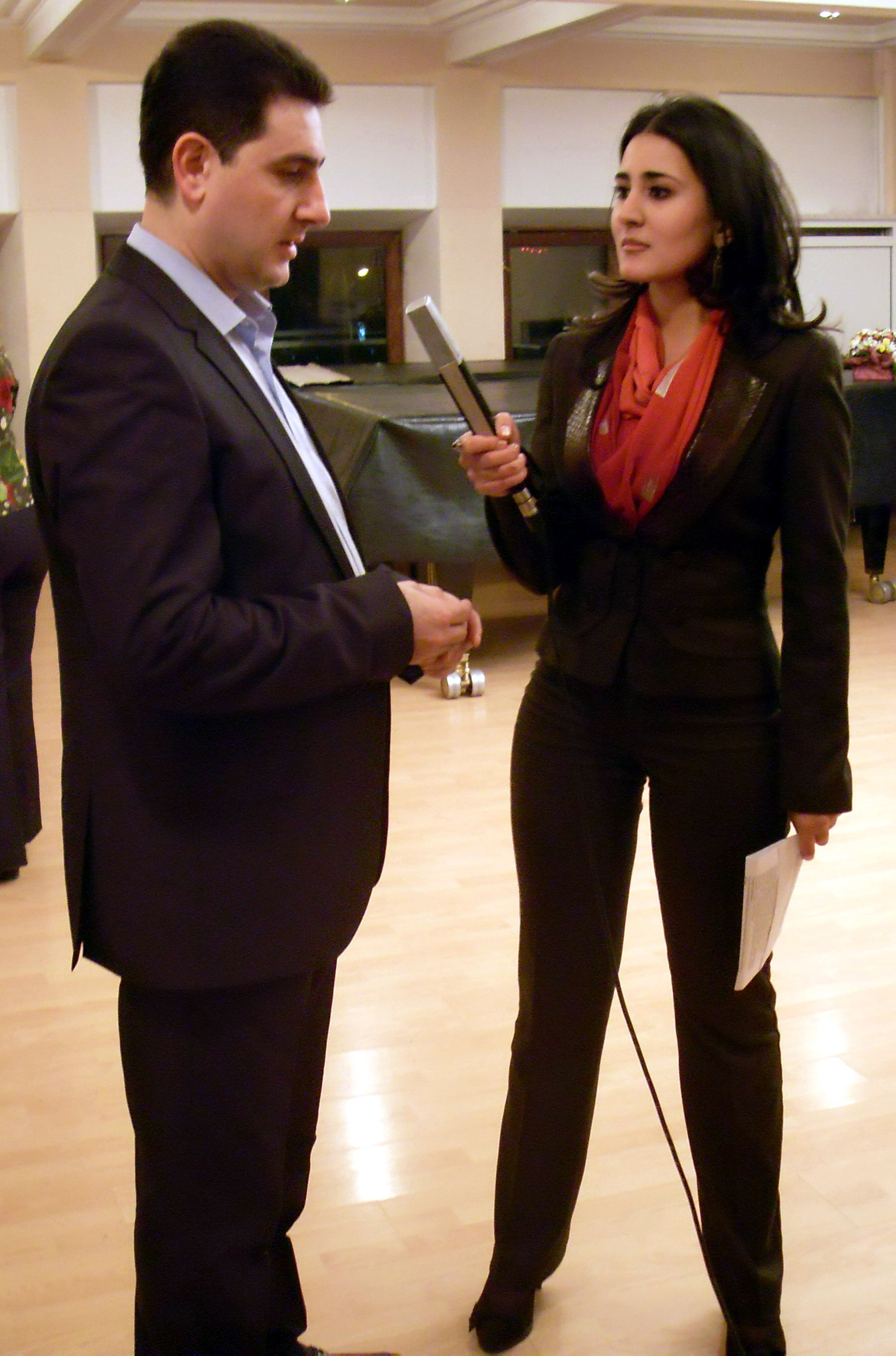

Eduard Topchjan (Armenian: Էդուարդ Թոփչյան; born in Yerevan) is an Armenian conductor, the principal conductor and artistic director of the Armenian Philharmonic Orchestra.

== Biography ==
Topchjan studied violin at the Yerevan Komitas Conservatory and went on to study conducting with Armenian conductor Ohan Durian followed by consultations from Sir Georg Solti, Claudio Abbado and Nello Santi.

Topchjan started conducting in 1991 when with a group of his friends from the Yerevan Komitas Conservatory he created the Serenade Chamber Orchestra, later known as the Armenian Chamber Players. The group has performed at over 1000 concerts in Europe, winning prizes at various international competitions and releasing CDs on the Thorofon label.

Eduard Topchjan made his debut with the Armenian Philharmonic Orchestra in 2000, when an orchestra composed of the Serenade Chamber Orchestra musicians and a group of leading APO musicians had an appearance at Bad Fussing Festival, Germany. The same year he was appointed as the Artistic Director and Principal Conductor of the APO and started appearances with the APO in Yerevan and abroad, interpreting the main symphonic repertoire as well as new compositions.

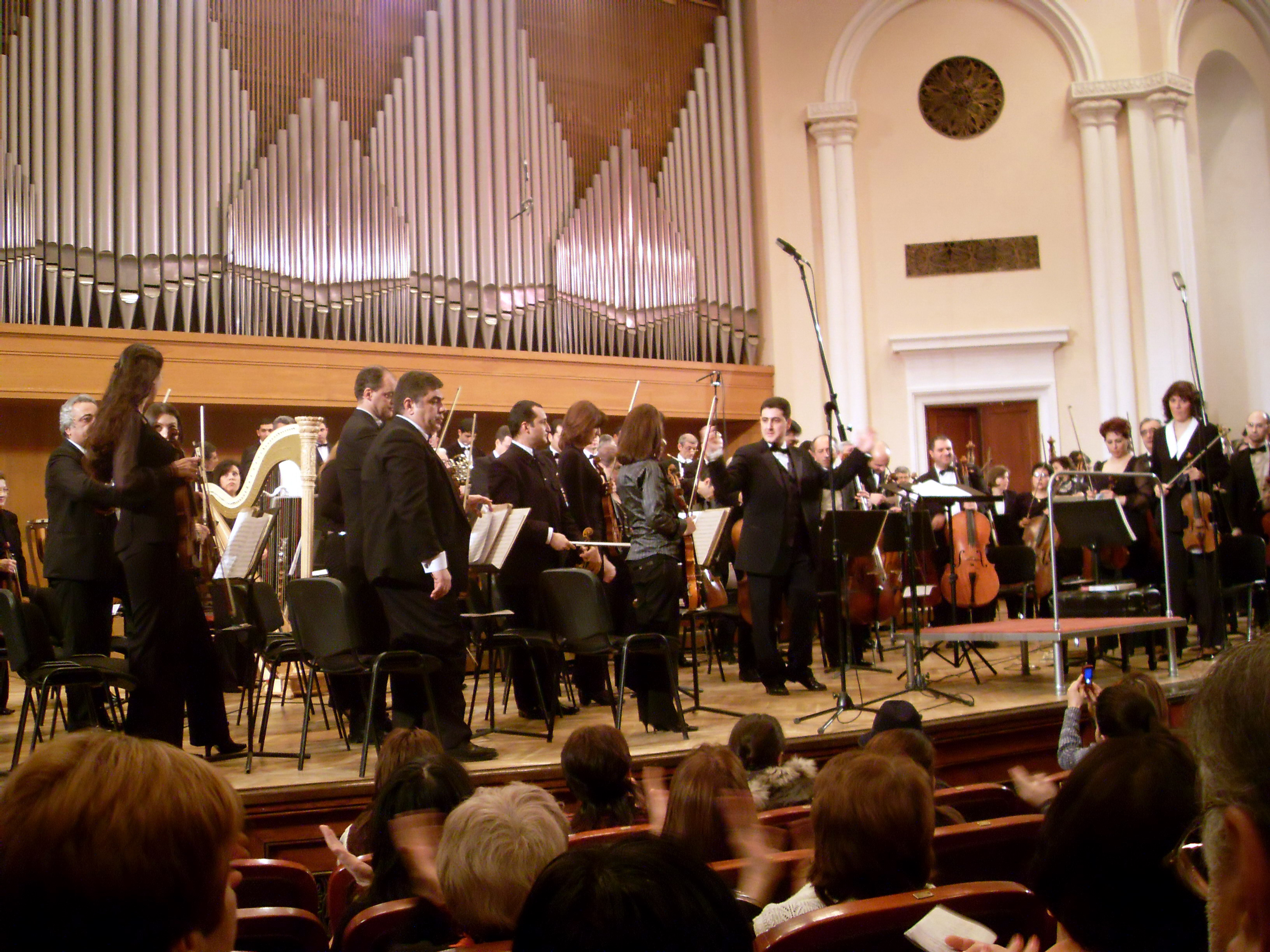

In 2001, he appeared with the Armenian Philharmonic Orchestra at the Grand Hall of the Moscow Conservatory, and in 2003, at the Bolshoi Theater.

In autumn 2006 the APO led by Eduard Topchjan participated in the 41st International Music Festival Moravian Autumn held in Brno, Czech Republic and continued the tour visiting also Prague, Bratislava and Nuremberg (Germany).

In February 2007 the APO with Maestro Topchjan toured France and appeared in Nice, St. Etienne, Lyon, Valence, Marseille, Issy les Moulineaux, which was the culmination of the Year of Armenia in France.

In 2008 the Armenian Philharmonic Orchestra led by Eduard Topchjan completed a tour through Japan with 15 concerts in the best concert halls in Tokyo, Osaka, Niigata, Nagoya, Hamamatsu and many others.

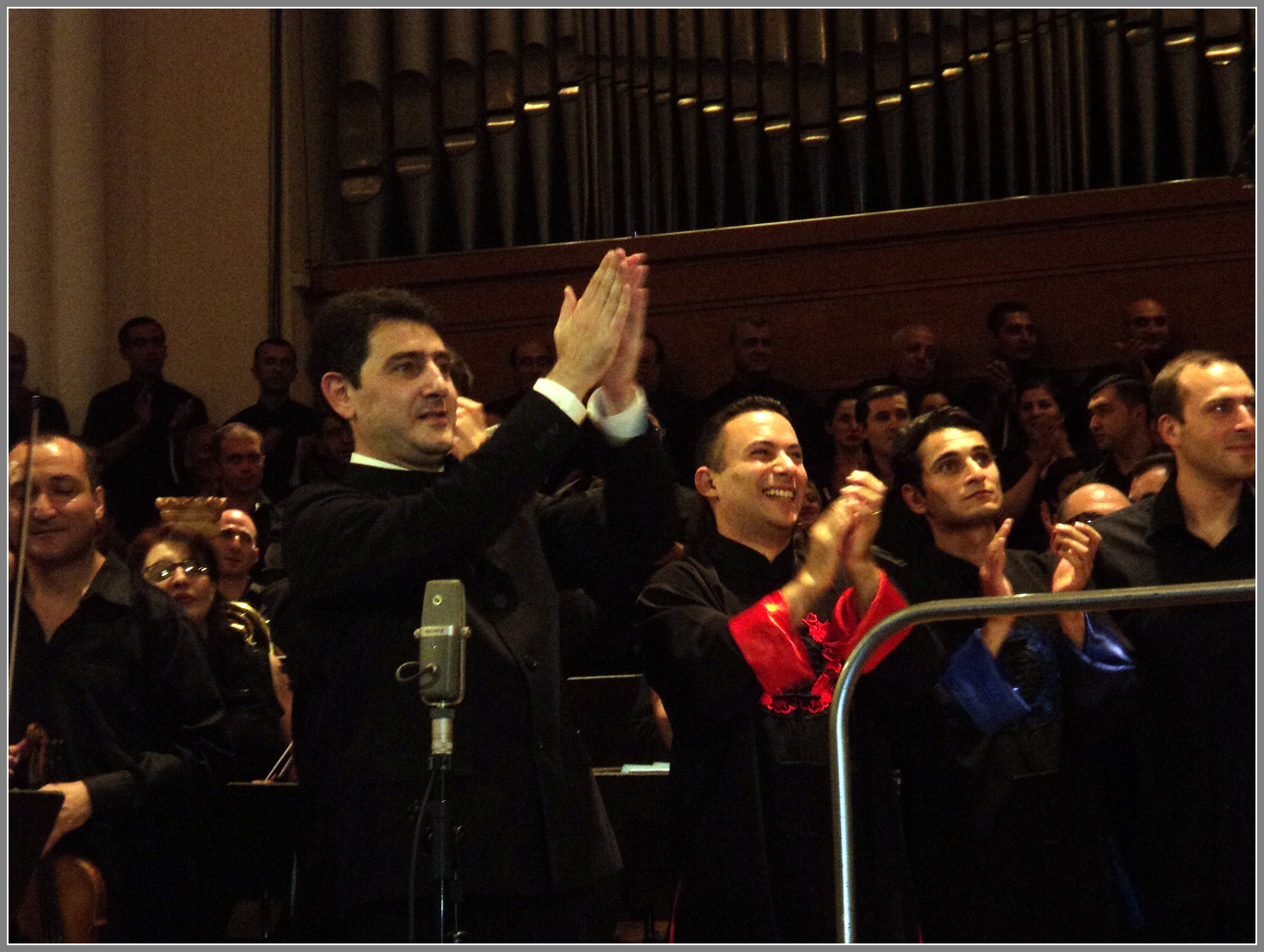

Topchjan is especially known for introducing music to both the orchestral and operatic repertoire. He has performed with this orchestra the operas Aida, The Barber of Seville; Il tabarro, Madama Butterfly, Turandot, Simone Boccanegra, Rigoletto, Pagliacci, The Queen of Spades, Tosca, La bohème and others.

Eduard Topchjan has appeared with such artists as Steven Isserlis, David Geringas, Renato Bruson, Kim Kashkashian, Alexei Lubimov, Emmanuel Pahud, Bernd Glemser, Tibor Varga, François-Joël Thiollier, Bernard Ringeissen, Zoran Todorovich, Mischa Maisky, Boris Berezovsky, Sergey Khachatryan, Isabel Bayrakdarian, Sergei Babayan, Sahan Arzruni, Julia Fischer, Wolfgang Meyer, Sergey Larin, Hasmik Papian, Vladimir Chernov, Sergei Nakariakov, Catherine Manoukian, Placido Domingo, Pinchas Zukerman, Konstantin Lifschitz, François-Frédéric Guy, Vag Papian, Mario Brunello, Kirill Gerstein, Kolya Blacher and many others.

As a guest conductor he appeared with many orchestras in Europe, among them the Frankfurt Opera, the Mecklenburgisches Staatstheater Schwerin, the Staatsphilharmonie Rheinland-Pfalz, the National Philharmonic Orchestra of Russia, Romanian TV and Radio Orchestra, the Pasadena Symphony and Kärntner Sinfonieorchester.

He was Artistic Director of several festivals. Since 2007 he has been the principal conductor at the Yerevan International Music Festival, which is an annual event and hosts numerous world-known musicians.

His vast repertoire includes all epochs from baroque to contemporary music, symphonic works as well as the chamber orchestra repertoire and operas. Several pieces by composers from Armenia and abroad have been written for him and world premiered by him and his orchestras.

== Awards ==
In 2007 the Ministry of Culture of Armenia awarded him with Meritorious Worker of Art title. In 2011 he was awarded a Gold Medal of the Ministry of Culture of Armenia.

In Autumn 2013 Maestro Topchjan was befitted with knighthood being awarded the Order of Merit of the Italian Republic.

== Discography ==
2011 Armenian Rhapsody- Aram Khachaturian: Concerto-Rhapsody for cello & orchestra, Suren Zakaryan: Monograph, for cello & chamber orchestra, Vache Sharafyan: Suite for cello & orchestra, Komitas:Krounk (the Crane) song. Alexander Chaushian, cello. Conductor: Eduard Topchjan. BIS records 2011

2008 Gomidas - songs Isabel Bayrakdarian, Serouj Kradjian (arrangements and piano), Chamber players of the Armenian Philharmonic Orchestra, conducted by Eduard Topchjan. Nonesuch, 2005

2007 Catherine Manoukian. Aram Khachaturian: Concerto for Violin and Orchestra. Dmitry Shostakovich: Concerto for Violin and Orchestra, in A minor op. 77. Catherine Manoukian, violin. Armenian Philharmonic Orchestra. Conductor: Eduard Topchjan. Marquis Records
