= Robert Atayan =

Robert Arshaki Atayan (Armenian: Ռոբերտ Աթայան; 7 (20) November 1915 – 4 March 1994) was an Armenian musicologist and composer.

He was born in Tehran, Iran and later moved to Soviet Armenia. He completed the Yerevan Komitas State Conservatory in 1941 and since 1944 taught there. He authored several important works on the Armenian system of musical notation called khaz. He spent almost thirty years researching Komitas's work and was the main editor of the Collected Works of Komitas in fourteen volumes (Yerevan, 1960–2006). He is recognized as the foremost authority of Komitas's art.

Atayan died in Los Angeles. He was buried in Yerevan.
