= Michael Maluntsian =

Michael Maluntsian (Armenian: Միքայել Մովսեսի Մալունցյան Mikael Movsesi Maluntsyan; Russian: Михаил Моисеевич Малунцян, 8 May [O.S. 25 April] 1903 in Baku, Russian Empire – 20 February 1973 in Yerevan, Armenian SSR) was an Armenian conductor, cellist and pedagogue. He was awarded the People's Artist of Armenia. He worked with Armenian Philharmonic Orchestra as its artistic director and principal conductor in 1945–1960 and 1966–1967.

Maluntsyan was trained as a cellist at the Tbilisi Conservatory, and subsequently also graduated from the Moscow Conservatory in 1935, where he studied conducting. He was the conductor of the opera studio of Moscow conservatory from 1934 to 1945. In 1945 he led the chair of orchestra instruments of the Yerevan Conservatory.
