= Arshak Adamian =

Armenian conductor, composer, and art critic

Arshak Adamian (1884–1956) was an Armenian conductor, composer, art critic, pedagogue. He was awarded Merited Artist of the RA. He was the founding artistic director and Principal Conductor of Armenian Philharmonic Orchestra in 1924–1926.

== Biography ==
Adamian studied piano and composition at Schtern Conservatory in Berlin (1904–1906). Then he graduated from Law Department, St. Petersburg University. From 1924 to 1926 he was the Rector of Yerevan Conservatory, then worked as professor of Leningrad Conservatory.
