= Avet Ter-Gabrielyan =

Armenian violinist

Avet Ter-Gabrielyan (Armenian: Ավդեյ Տեր-Գաբրիելյան, April 7, 1899 - June 19, 1983) was an Armenian violinist and the founder of the Komitas Quartet. Avet Gabrielyan Music School in Yerevan is named in his honor.

== Early life ==
Avet Ter-Gabrielyan was born on April 19, 1899, in Nor Nakhichevan (now Proletarsky District, Rostov-on-Don).

== Education ==
He studied violin under Nicholas Averino (father of soprano Olga Averino) in Rostov-on-Don before continuing his studies at the Moscow State Tchaikovsky Conservatory with Lev Tseitlin.

== Career ==
In November 1924, Ter-Gabrielyan co-founded Komitas Quartet. He was the quartet's first violin from 1925 to 1976. The ensemble performed with such musicians as Konstantin Igumnov and Heinrich Neuhaus.

Aram Khachaturian dedicated to Ter-Gabrielyan his "Dance" (1933).

From 1929 Ter-Gabrielyan taught at the Moscow Conservatory.

== Death ==
Gabrielyan died on June 19, 1983, in Moscow.

== Awards ==
- 1945: People's Artist of the Armenian SSR
