= Rewşan Çeliker =

Kurdish musician, singer

- Born: September 11, 1980 (age 45); Tatvan, Bitlis, Turkey
- Citizenship: Turkey
- Years active: 2017–present
- Website: rewshan.com

Rewşan Çeliker or Rewşan (Kurdish: ڕەوشان چەلیکەر) is a Kurdish musician, singer, songwriter, and violinist born in Tatvan, Bitlis, Turkey. Her songs are mainly sung in Kurmanji.

== Education and musical career ==
Çeliker graduated from the violin-viola department of Pera Fine Arts Academy in Istanbul. She also holds degrees in drama therapy (PDR) and acting, with a master's degree in the latter. Her musical background extends beyond violin and viola, as she is also proficient in vocals and ukulele.

Çeliker has been active in her musical career since 2017. She has performed as a violinist and vocalist with the Istanbul Film Music Orchestra and the Horizon group. Since 2018, she has pursued a solo career focused on reviving forgotten songs. Her repertoire draws heavily from the Kurdish music archives of Erivan and Baghdad Radio, as well as the collections of Armenian composer Gomidas Vartabed.

== Documentary work ==
In addition to her musical contributions, Çeliker is dedicated to preserving Kurdish cultural heritage. She created and presented the documentary series "Dengên Bakur (Voices of the North)" which explores the oral tradition and cultural memory of Kurdish women. The documentary series focuses on recording the voices of Kurdish dengbêj (singers who perform epics and tales).
