= Serenade Chamber Orchestra =

Serenade Chamber Orchestra was founded in Armenia in 1991. Since 1992 the orchestra has toured extensively to France, Germany, Italy, Switzerland and Austria. Under the leadership of its artistic director Eduard Topchjan the ensemble won the 1st Prize at the Valentino Bucchi International Competition in Rome (1995). Prior to that, the orchestra topped the contester's list at the competition in the Valzoda, Italy. The orchestra has released 6 CD's with the pieces of Arnold Schoenberg, Vivaldi and Edvard Mirzoyan.
