= Komitas Quartet =

String quartet ensemble

The Komitas Quartet is a string quartet musical ensemble founded in Moscow in November 1924, and is one of the oldest-established string quartets in the world still performing. It is now in the third and fourth generation of membership.

== Original line-up ==
The founding members were four Armenian students at the Moscow State Tchaikovsky Conservatory:
1st violin: Avet Gabrielyan
2nd violin: Levon Ogandjanyan
Viola: Mikael Terian (Микаэл Тэриан)
Cello: Sergei Aslamazyan

This group gave its first public performance in February 1925.

== Origins ==
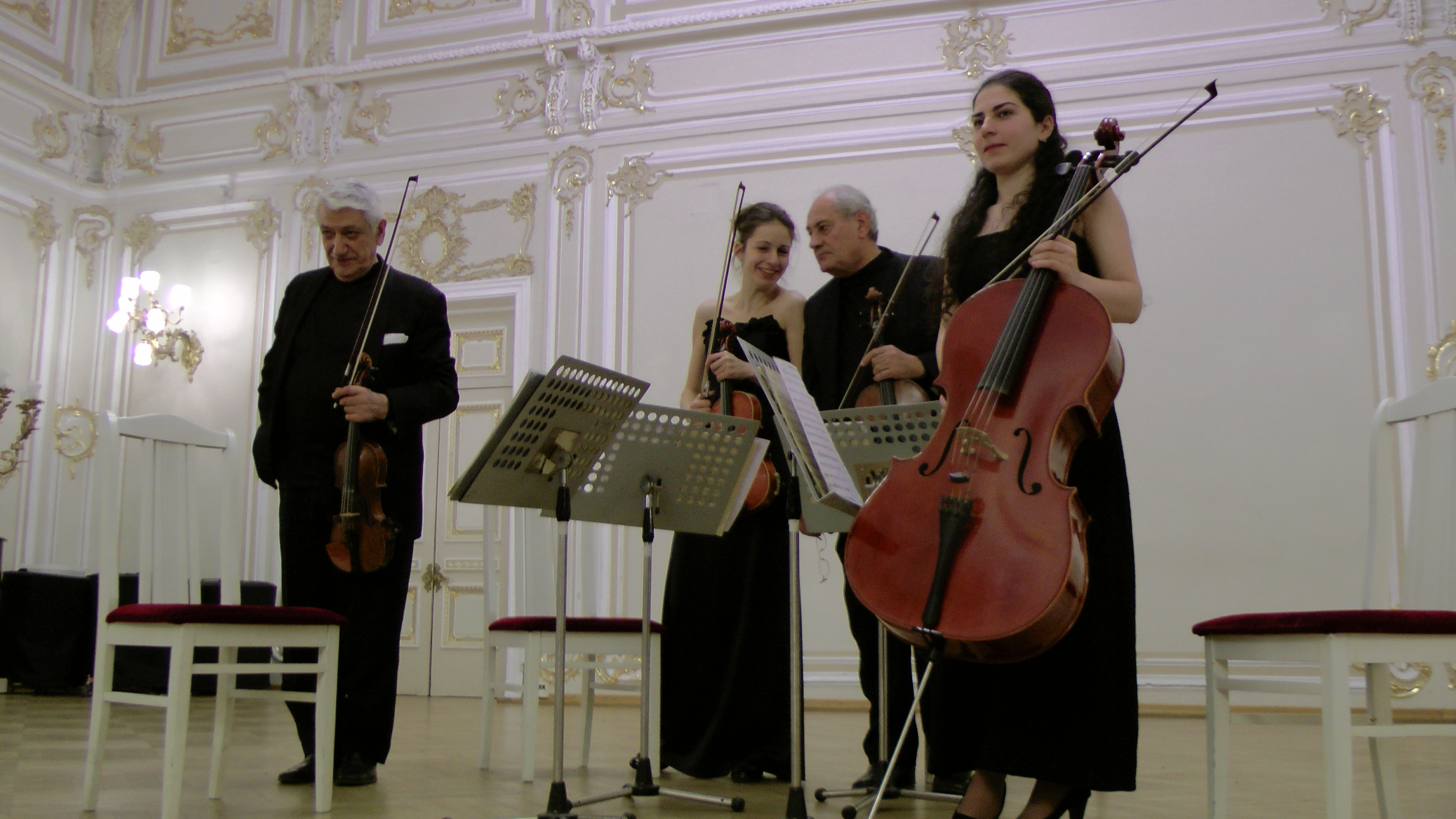
The Komitas Quartet at the celebration of the 90th anniversary in the Ministry of Health of the Philharmonic of St. Petersburg

This group, the best-known Armenian music group, carries the name of Komitas (Soghomon Soghomonyan, 1869–1935). The quartet has performed with Sviatoslav Richter, Nina Dorliak, Emil Gilels, Dmitri Shostakovich, Mstislav Rostropovich, Victor Merzhanov, Konstantin Igumnov, Walter Zeufert, Mario Brunello, Anahit Nersesyan and other prominent musicians.

== Current line-up ==
- 1st violin: Eduard Tadevosyan
- 2nd violin: Syuzi Yeritsyan
- Viola: Aleksandr Kosemyan
- Cello: Angela Sargsyan

== Premieres ==
Date	Venue	Composer	Composition	Joined by
1958	Moscow	Sofia Gubaidulina	Piano Quintet	Sofia Gubaidulina, piano

== Recordings ==
The quartet made a number of collection recordings in the USSR and released numerous albums in Russia, the United Kingdom, France and the United States. The latest CDs were released in recent three years. In 2007 "Armenian Contemporary Composers" studio album was released on the VEM label. In 2002, the CD was released "On the Fortieth Day" on Traditional Crossroads label in New York, with "Two Devotions" by the composer Vache Sharafyan. The next edition of the "Armenian Folk Miniatures" album was released in November 2010 by subvention of the Ministry of Culture of Armenia.

== Management ==
- Arman Padaryan 2002–2011
- Wise Business since 2011
