= Hasmik Papian =

Armenian soprano (born 1957)

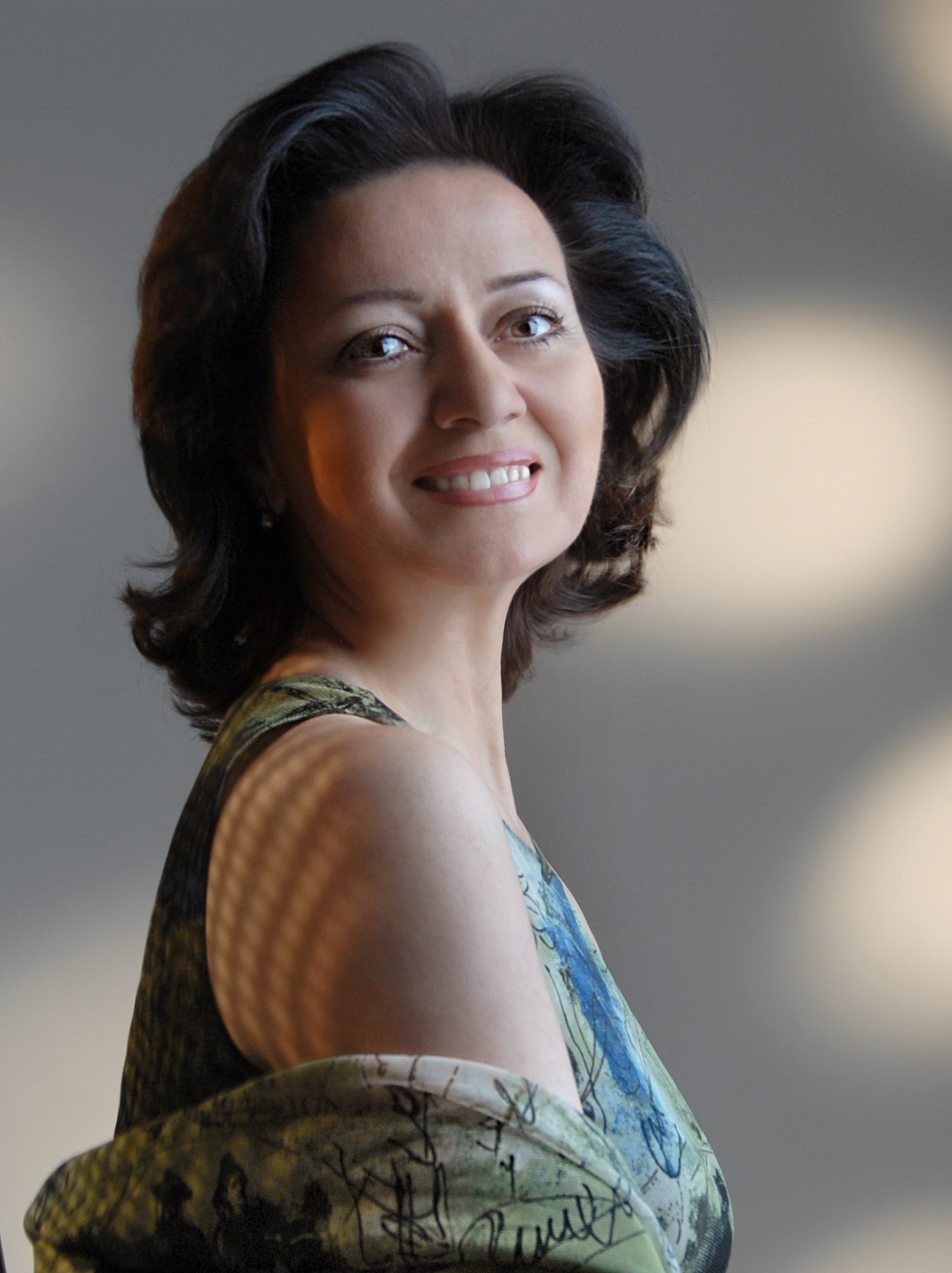

Background information
- Born: September 2, 1957
- Origin: Yerevan

Hasmik Papian (Armenian: Հասմիկ Պապյան; born 2 September 1957) is an Armenian soprano. She was awarded the People's Artist of Armenia title in 2004. Papian was named a Cultural ambassador of Armenia in the World for her contributions to Armenian culture in 2005 by the Catholicos of the Holy See of St. Echmiadzin and All Armenians Karekin II and awarded the Order of Saint Sahag and Saint Mesrob and Order of Saint Mesrop Mashtots.

"

== Biography ==
Hasmik Papian was born in Yerevan, Armenia (then part of the Soviet Union) on 2 September 1957. She first developed an interest in music when she started playing the violin at the age of 5. Papian graduated from Komitas High Academy in Yerevan first as a violinist, then as a singer. Her friends had encouraged her to explore her voice, and Tatevik Sazandaryan, the head of the vocal department at Komitas, had told Papian after hearing a couple of notes from her that she had to sing.

After her debut at the Armenian National Opera, she was invited as a soloist among others by Opera Bonn and Deutsche Oper am Rhein, Düsseldorf, Germany. Soon, she started an international career and has since appeared at numerous theaters, including the most prestigious operatic stages and concert houses in the world like The Metropolitan Opera and Carnegie Hall in New York, San Francisco Opera, Washington National Opera, La Scala of Milan, Opéra Bastille in Paris, Gran Theatre del Liceu Barcelona, Teatro Real Madrid, London Wigmore Hall, the Vienna State Opera and Musikverein Vienna, Concertgebouw and De Nederlandse Opera Amsterdam, Zurich Opera, Mariinsky Theatre St. Petersburg, as well as the state operas of Munich, Stuttgart, Hamburg, Dresden and Berlin.

Papian attributes her big break to winning the Belvedere Singing Competition in Vienna in 1990. One of the prizes of the Belvedere competition was to sing from her repertoire at the Grand Theatre in Warsaw. She had included Norma in her stock of plays, though hadn't expected to sing it due to her youth and inexperience. Papian accepted a last-minute offer to sing Norma at the Teatr Wielki, although she had never sung the opera live before, and prepared in five days’ notice, two brief rehearsal days, and a single orchestra rehearsal. Norma would later become her signature role. Papian sang Norma for the first time on in Warsaw in 1993, where Giancarlo del Monaco, son of Mario Del Monaco, caught her performance and offered her a contract with the Opera Bonn in Germany. Her professional career as an opera singer had then begun. This very first contract was for principal roles in Verdi’s La traviata, Donna Anna in Mozart’s Don Giovanni, and Micaela in Bizet’s Carmen. She sang Tosca for the first time at the Vienna State Opera in 1995.

== Repertoire ==
Her repertoire ranges from Mozart's Donna Anna (Don Giovanni), Rossini's Mathilde (William Tell), Halévy's Rachel (La Juive) and Bizet's Micaëla (Carmen), passing by Puccini's Mimì (La Bohème), Magda (La Rondine), Tosca, Madama Butterfly, Ponchielli's Gioconda (La Gioconda), and Boito's Margareta/ Elena (Mefistofele) to Tchaikovsky's Lisa (The Queen of Spades) and Richard Wagner's Senta (The Flying Dutchman). It contains twelve Verdi-roles: La Traviata, Desdemona (Otello), Aida, Leonora (Il Trovatore and La forza del destino), Elisabetta (Don Carlo), Elena (I vespri siciliani), Amelia (Simon Boccanegra), Elvira (Ernani), Lady Macbeth, Abigaille (Nabucco), Odabella (Attila) as well as the Requiem. A central part for her is Bellini's Norma; she has appeared in this role among others at Vienna Volksoper, at the Regio of Turin, in Montreal, Baltimore, Detroit, Denver, Washington, D.C. and at the Metropolitan Opera New York, at Opéra de Marseille, Opéra de Montpellier, at the festivals Chorégies d'Orange (South of France) and Luglio Trapanese (Sicily), in Mannheim, Stuttgart, St. Gallen, Split, Rotterdam and at De Nederlandse Opera Amsterdam. The Amsterdam production has been released on DVD in October 2006. In January 2009, she has added another bel canto role to her repertoire: Queen Elizabeth I in Donizetti's Roberto Devereux (debut at The Dallas Opera).

== Artistic appearances ==
Papian has appeared in most European countries, in Israel, Lebanon (Baalbeck International Festival), Japan, Latin America (Mexico, Brazil, Chile), as well as Canada (Toronto, Montreal) and the United States where she is invited regularly (besides Washington, DC, San Francisco and the Met also Baltimore, Detroit, Cincinnati Festival and Denver, among others). She has performed with many notable conductors – such as Riccardo Muti, Valery Gergiev, Georges Prêtre, Michel Plasson, Marcello Viotti, Maurizio Arena, Myung-whun Chung, Gennady Rozhdestvensky, Plácido Domingo, Leonard Slatkin, James Morris and James Conlon. Papian is also very active promoting the music of fellow Armenian composers such as Komitas Vardapet, Yeranian, Kanatchian, Tchoukhadjian, Tigranian, Avet Terterian and Tigran Mansurian in her recitals. In 2006, a Super Audio CD with 36 songs of Komitas had been released, including some nine songs on German poetry recorded there for the first time ever. In addition, she makes the time to perform several benefit concerts for worthy causes, including the Armenian Relief Society of Lebanon, UNICEF, Mammography Center of Yerevan, Gyumri rebuilding efforts, and Armenian Genocide commemorative events.

She was honored in 2004 with the title of the "People's Artist" of the Republic of Armenia and had received the Order of Saint Mesrop Mashtots from Catholicos of the Holy See of Cilicia Aram I. In 2005, Papian was awarded the Order of Saint Sahag and Saint Mesrob from the hands of Catholicos Karekin II of Armenia at the Holy Mother See of the Armenian Apostolic Church in Echmiadzin, for her role as a "cultural ambassador of Armenia throughout the world".
