= The Gurdjieff Ensemble =

The Gurdjieff Folk Instruments Ensemble based in Armenia was founded in 2008, and is led by the Armenian musician, Levon Eskenian. The Ensemble’s awards include the prestigious Dutch Edison Award: Best World Music Album 2012 and Armenian National Music Award: Best Folk Music Album 2011, for their album, “Music of Georges I. Gurdjieff,’’ produced by ECM Records. The ensemble consists of Armenia’s leading practitioners of traditional music performing on Duduk, Blul, Kamancha, Oud, Kanōn, Santur, Tar/Saz, Dap/Daf, Dhol, and Tombak. The repertoire is composed of the “mystic and spiritual teacher,” George I. Gurdjieff's Armenian, Greek, Assyrian, Arabic, Kurdish, Caucasian spiritual and folk music, authentically arranged for Eastern instruments by Eskenian. The repertoire also includes additional Eastern music that exemplifies Gurdjieff’s musical influences during his travels in the East.

== Awards and recognition ==
- November 5, 2012 Dutch Edison Award Jazz/World 2012 for Best World Music Album, Netherlands
- April 17, 2012 Best Folk Music Album 2011 at Armenian National Music Awards, Armenia
- September 19, 2011 Australian Broadcasting Corporation (ABC) Classic FM CD of the Week, Australia
- November, 2011- Editor’s choice as top of the world for the Songlines magazine's November/December issue, United Kingdom
- January 7, 2012 WQXR- Q2 Classical Music Radio, music album of the week for January 7, 2012, United States

== Ensemble Musician Featured on the album "Music of Georges I. Gurdjieff" (2011) ==
Levon Eskenian: Director; Emmanuel Hovhannisyan: duduk; Avag Margaryan: blul; Armen Ayvazyan: kamancha; Aram Nikoghosyan: oud; Meri Vardanyan: kanon; Vladimir Papikyan: santur; Davit Avagyan: tar; Mesrop Khalatyan: dap, dhol; Armen Yeganyan: saz; Reza Nesimi: tombak; Harutyun Chkolyan: duduk; Tigran Karapetyan: duduk; Artur Atoyan: duduk.
