= Gevorgian Seminary =

Gevorkian Theological Seminary
- Գևորգյան Հոգևոր Ճեմարան
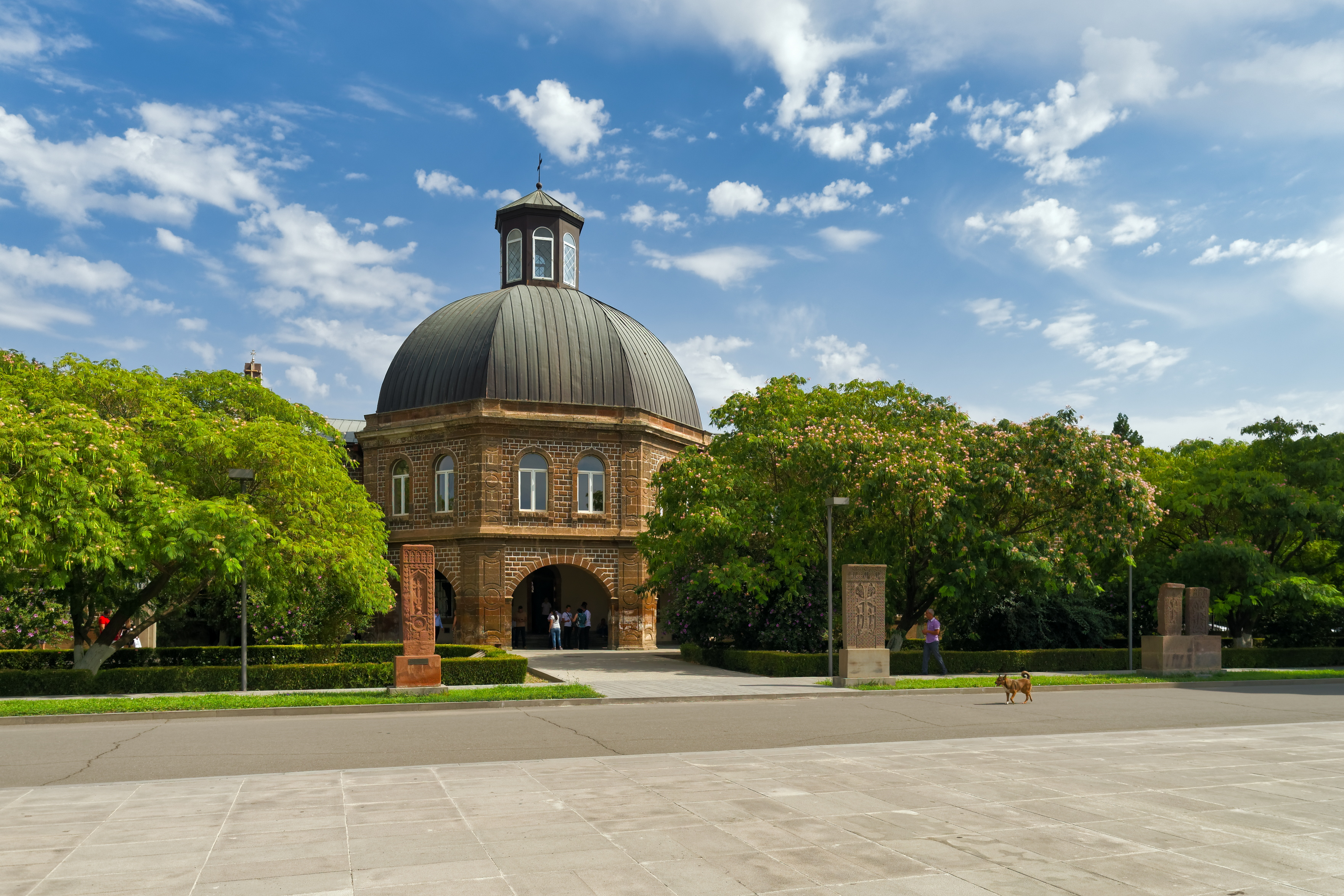
- Gevorkian Seminary
- Type: Seminary, Theological Institute
- Established: October 5, 1874; 151 years ago
- Affiliations: Armenian Apostolic Church
- Director: Bishop Gevorg Saroyan
- Head: Pastor Garegin Hambardzumyan
- Location: Vagharshapat, Armavir Province, Armenia; 40°09′43″N 44°17′37″E
- Campus: Urban
- Colours: Purple, Gold
- Website: Official website

Gevorkian Theological Seminary (Armenian: Գևորգյան Հոգևոր Ճեմարան Gevorkyan Hogevor Č̣emaran), also known as Gevorkian Seminary (Armenian: Գևրգյան Ճեմարան Gevorkyan Č̣emaran, pronounced [gɛvɔɾkʰˈjɑn t͡ʃɛmɑˈɾɑn]), is a theological university-institute of the Armenian Apostolic Church opened in 1874. It is located in the town of Vagharshapat (Etchmiadzin) within the complex of the Mother See of Holy Etchmiadzin, Armenia.

== History ==
=== Nineteenth century ===
In May 1869 Catholicos Gevorg IV laid the cornerstone of the Gevorkian Seminary on the grounds of Etchmiadzin. The seminary was under construction from 1869–1874 while the Armenian Church negotiated its opening with the Tsarist government. On 28 September 1874 the seminary building's completion was celebrated. On 5 October 1874 the Caucasus Commission told the Armenian Church that the tsar had approved the seminary charter and it was allowed to open.

The seminary had its first graduates during the 1885–86 academic year.

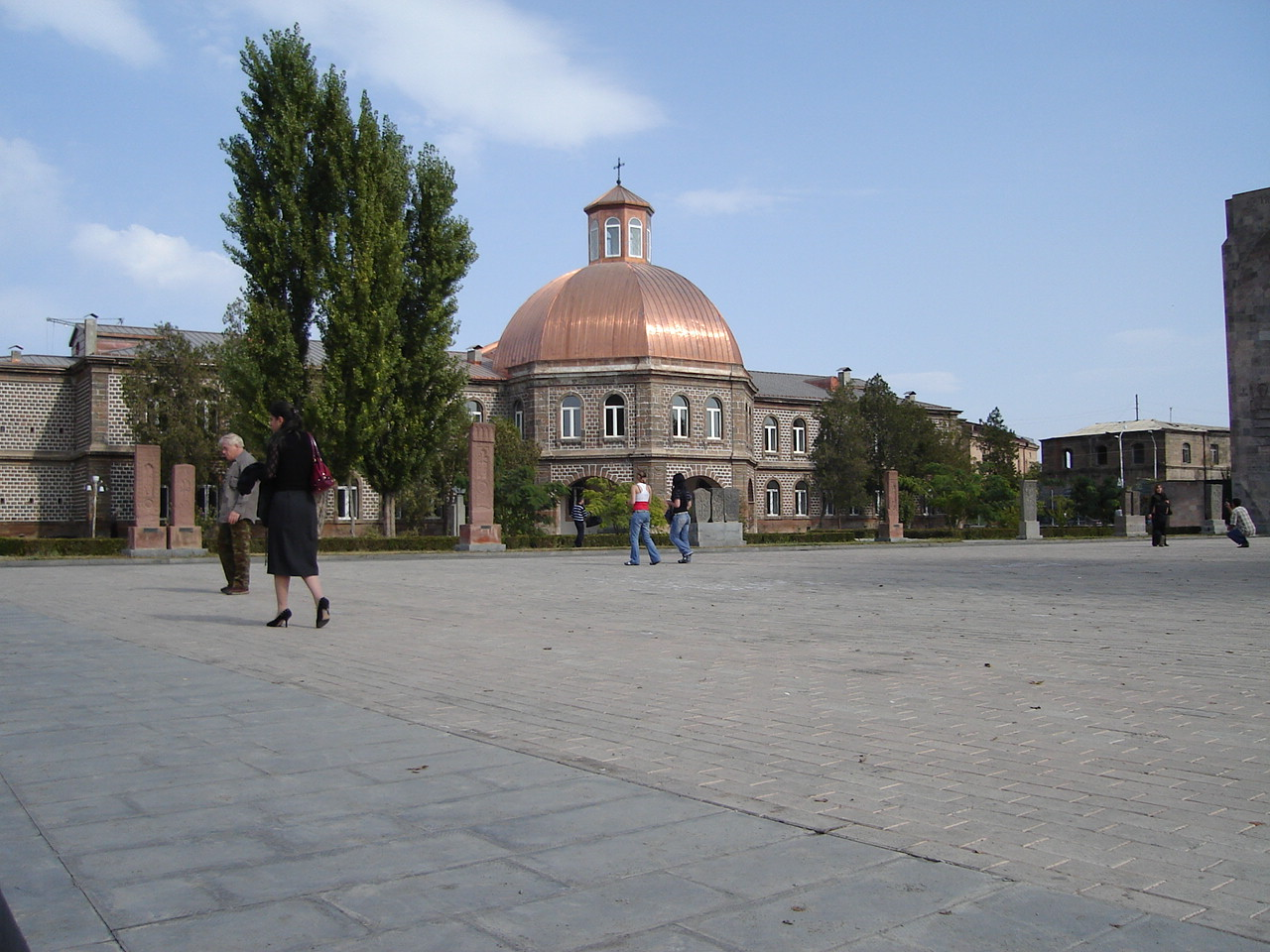
The seminary building

Graduates of the seminary included Komitas, a pioneering ethnomusicologist and arranger of church music.

The seminary also prepared teachers for secular schools. During the first 43 years of existence, the seminary prepared 43 clergymen/teachers who in turn provided education for thousands of students.

=== Early 20th century ===
20th century figures who graduated from the seminary include Catholicos Gevork Vl Chorekchian, Karekin l Hovsepiants (Catholicos of the Great House of Cilicia), Ruben Ter-Minasian, Komitas, Avetik Isahakian, and Levon Shant.

During and after the Armenian genocide, the Mother See of Holy Etchmiadzin was filled with massive numbers of refugees. Catholicos Gevork I and the director, Bishop Karekin Hovsepiants, decided to temporarily close the seminary in December 1917.

On 28 June 1928, Catholicos Gevork V applied to the president of the Peoples Commissariat Council Sahak Ter-Gabrielian to reopen the seminary. A building was allocated, but the government confiscated it stating a temporary need. It was never returned to the church and is currently the State Central Archive of Armenia.

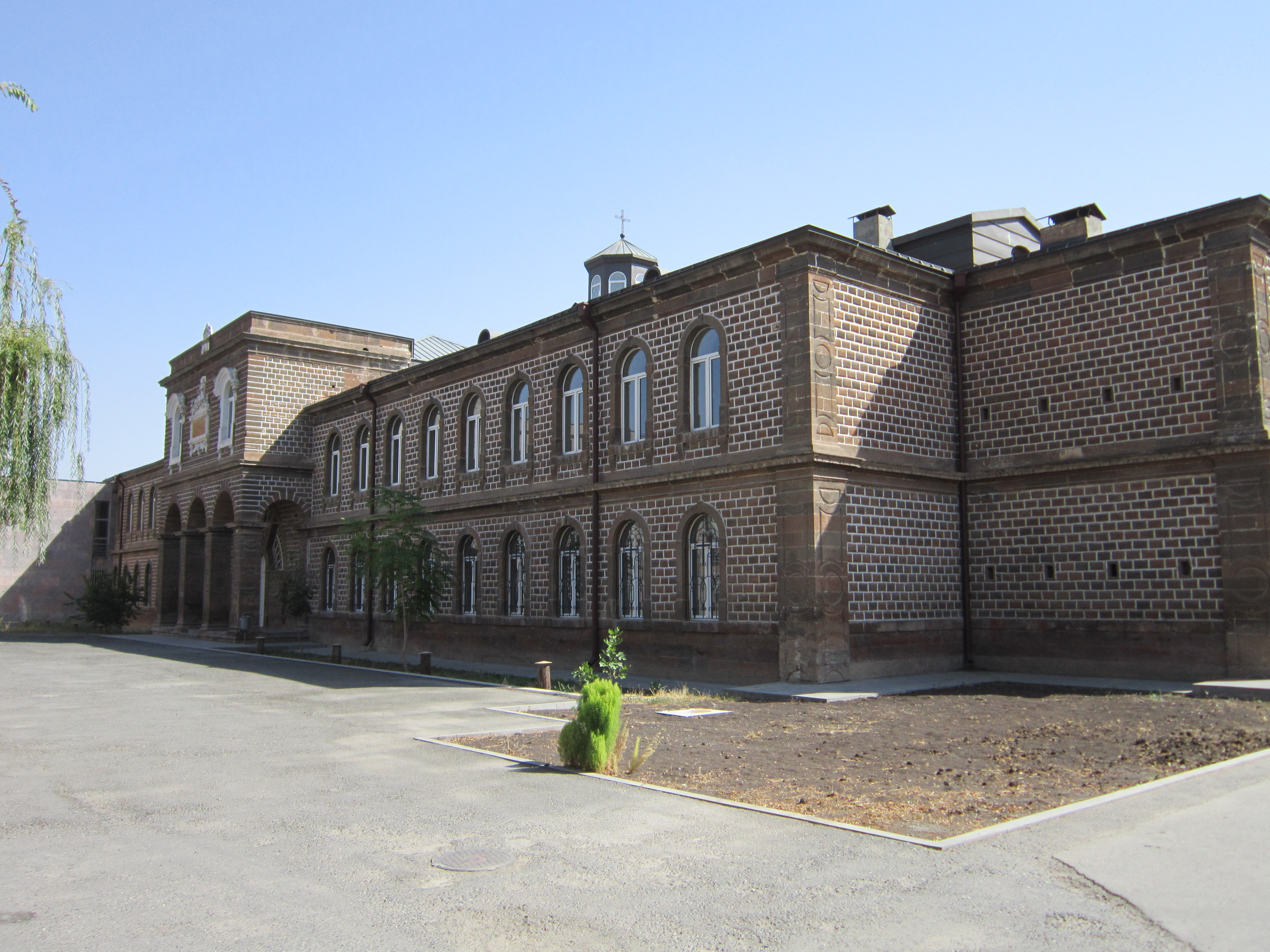
Back of the building

=== 1945 reopening ===
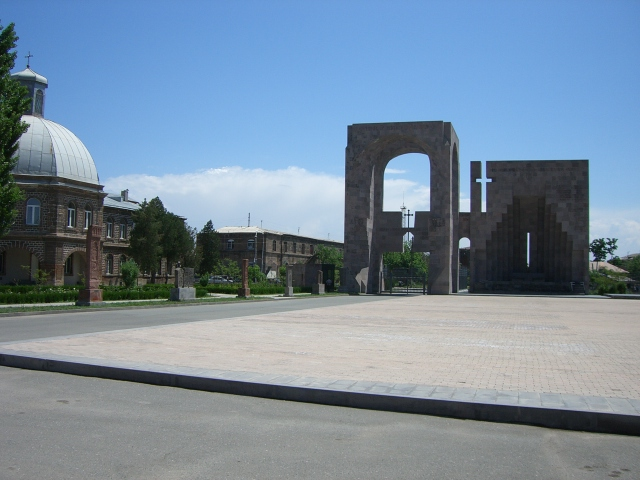
Front space of the Seminary

On 1 November 1945 the seminary reopened.

On 6 September 1945 educator and English language specialist Minas Minasian was appointed director.

In 1951 the first nine students graduated.

== 21st century ==
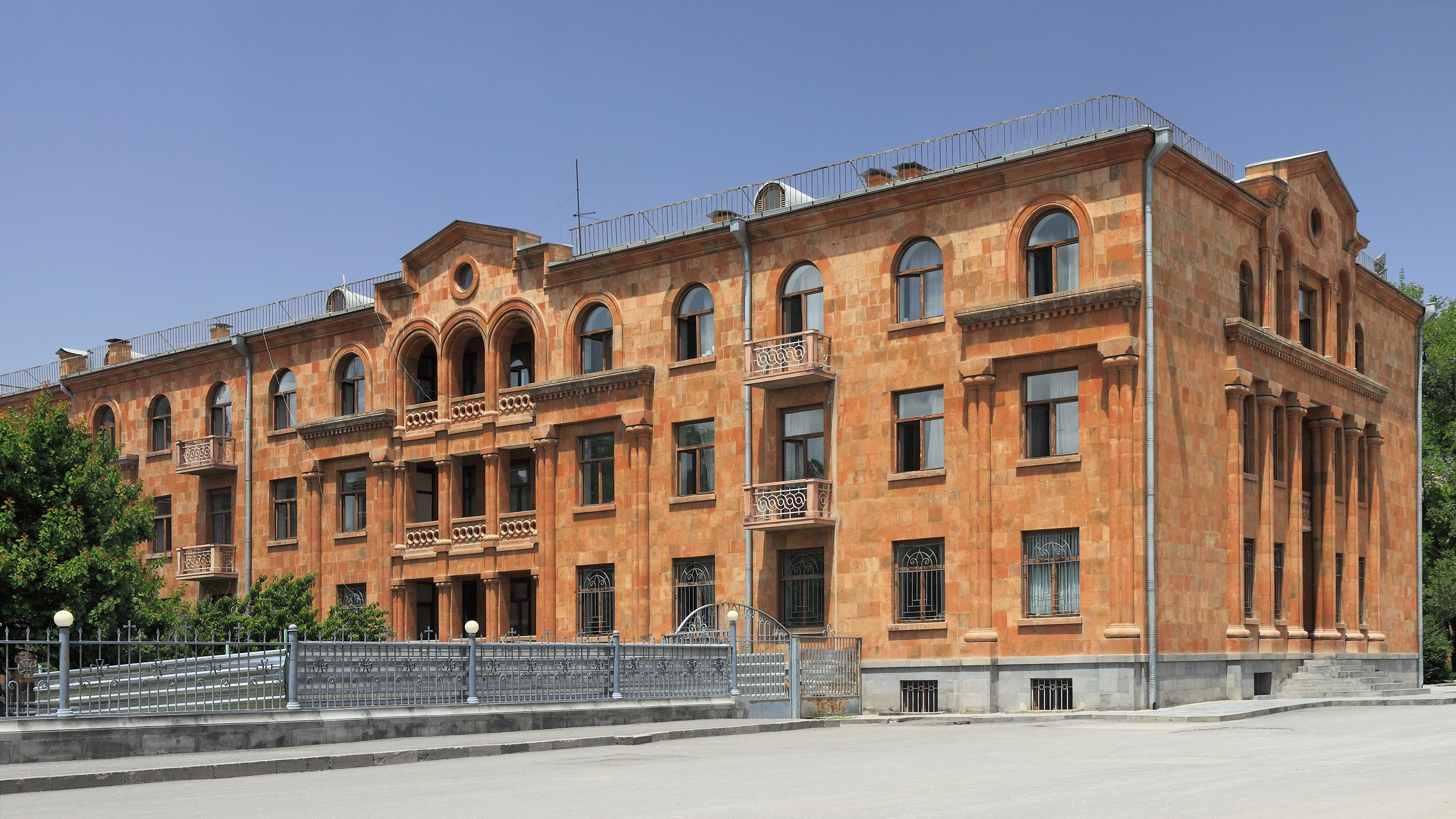
Gevorkian Seminary dormitory opened in 1999

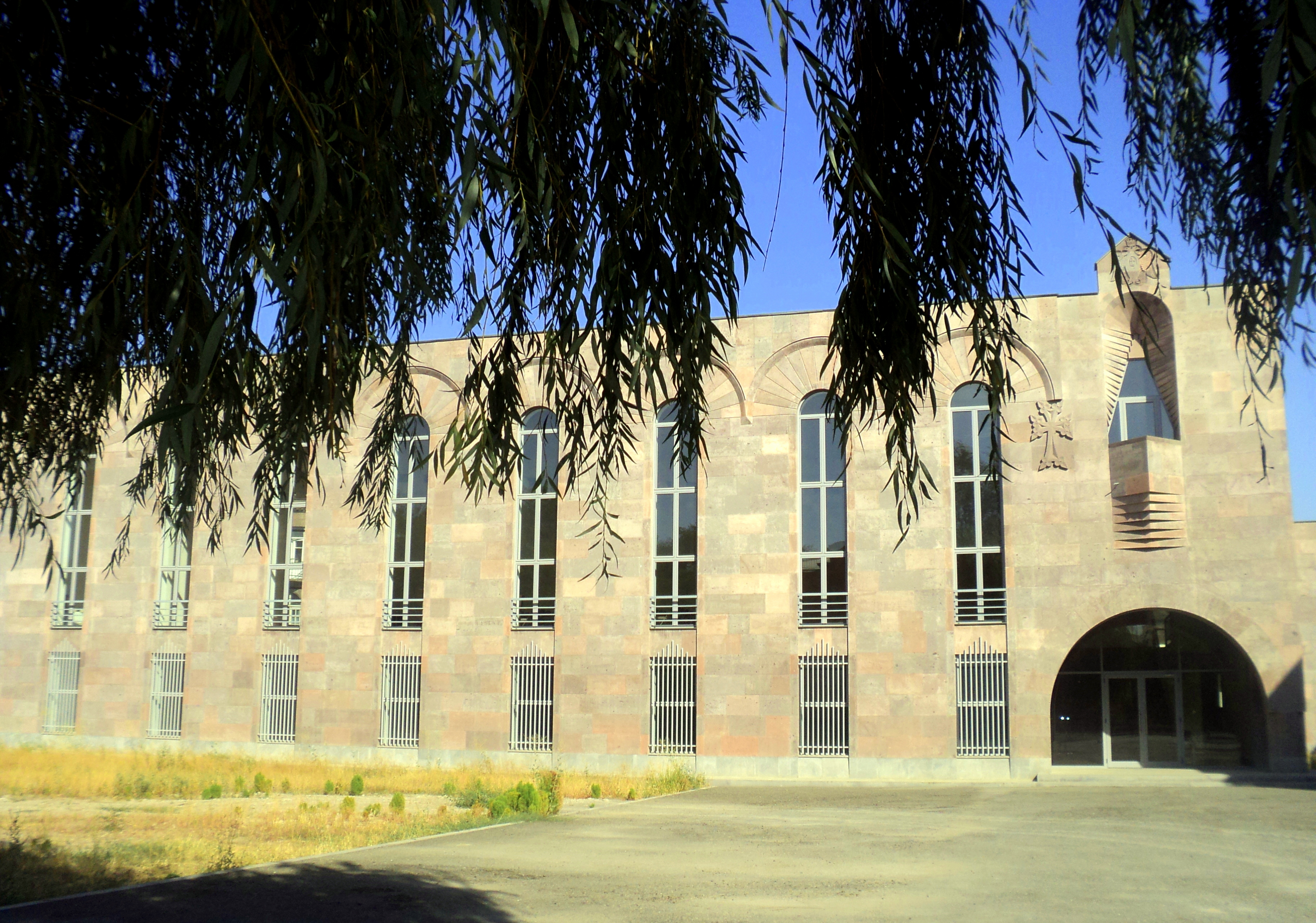
The sports and events centre, opened in 2011

In 2001–2002 the Ministry of Education of Armenia granted the seminary the status of a Religious University.

=== Structure ===
The academic council is the governing body of the seminary. The council is headed by the Catholicos of All Armenians. The educational methods committee of the seminary has a consulting role. The members of the committee are selected through the initiation of the academic council, approved by the Catholicos. In November 2015, the cultural committee of the seminary was formed.

Currently the seminary has the following chairs:

- Chair of Biblical studies.
- Chair of Historical Theology.
- Chair of Christian Doctrine.
- Chair of Practical Theology.
- Chair of Philology.
- Chair of Humanities.

The seminary offers bachelor, master and PhD degrees in the above-mentioned fields.

== See also ==
- Category:Gevorgian Seminary alumni
