= Armenian Philharmonic Orchestra =

Music

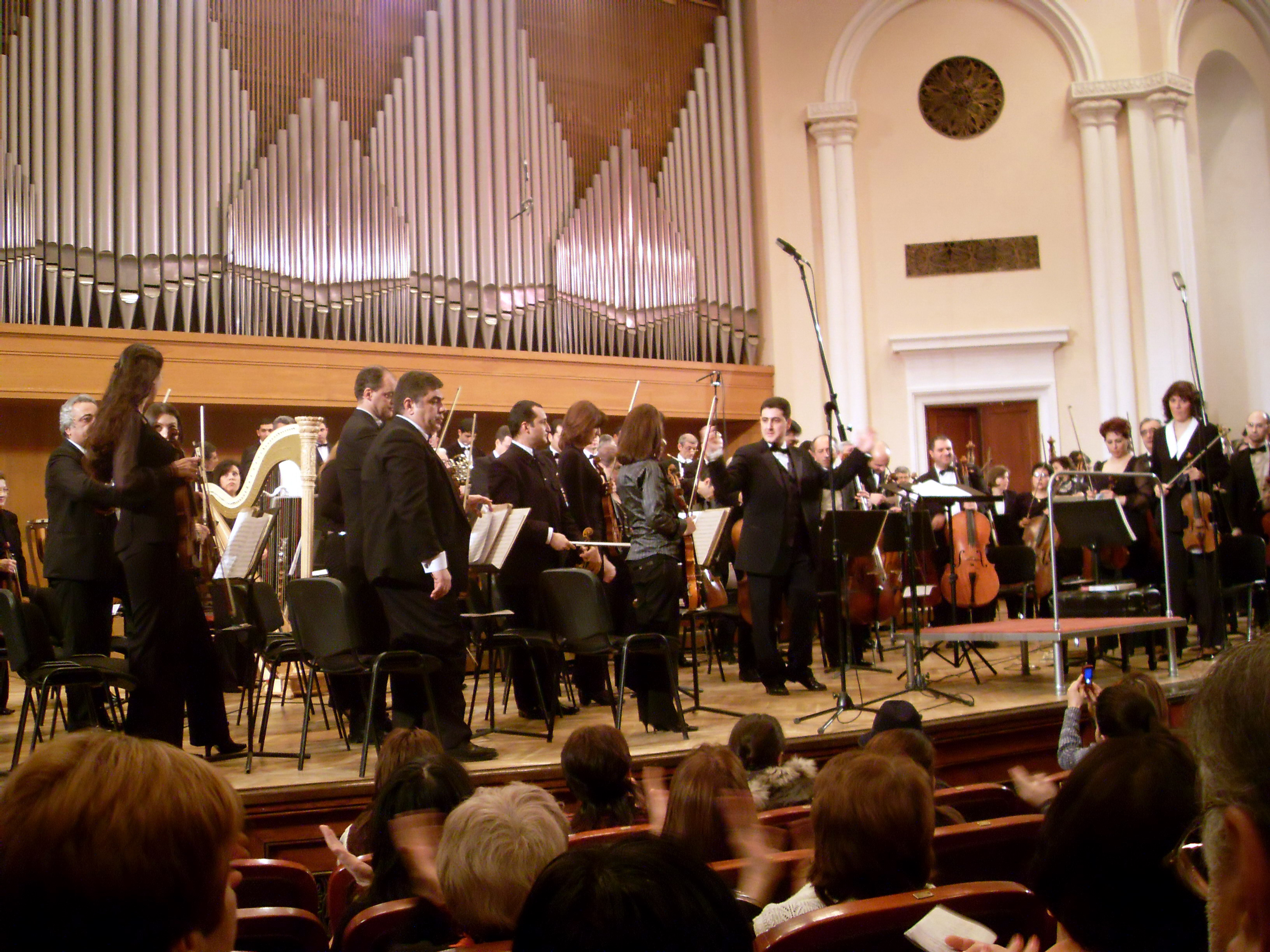

The Armenian National Philharmonic Orchestra (ANPO) (Armenian: Հայաստանի ազգային ֆիլհարմոնիկ նվագախումբ) is the national orchestra of Armenia. It was founded in 1925 as a symphony orchestra of the Yerevan State Conservatory. Now it performs in Khachaturian Hall, Yerevan.

Over the years, conductors Arshak Adamian, Alexander Spendiarian, Ohan Durian, Valeri Gergiev, Loris Tjeknavorian, etc. directed the orchestra. Since its foundation, the orchestra has performed most of the classical repertoire. Many famous artists as David Oistrach, Sviatoslav Richter, Mstislav Rostropovich, David Geringas, Boris Berezovsky, Ian Gillan have appeared with the orchestra. Aram Khachaturian, Dmitri Kabalevsky and others have conducted their works at the APO. More than 30 CDs have been released with the APO recordings.

== Principal conductors ==
- Eduard Topchjan (2000–)
- Loris Tjeknavorian (1999–2000)
- Mikael Avetisyan (1998–1999)
- Loris Tjeknavorian (1989–1998)
- Vahagn Papian (1987–1989)
- Martin Nersissian (1986–1987)
- Rafael Mangassarian (1985–1986)
- Valery Gergiev (1981–1985)
- David Khanjian (1974–1981)
- Aram Katanian (1970–1973)
- Ruben Vartanyan (1967–1970)
- Michael Maluntsian (1966–1967)
- Ohan Durian (1960–1965)
- Michael Maluntsian (1945–1960)
- Constantine Saradjian (1941–1945)
- Gevork Budaghian (1932–1933)
- Souren Charekian (1928–1932)
- Alexander Spendiaryan (1926–1928)
- Arshak Adamian (1924–1926)
