= Ohan Durian =

Armenian conductor and composer (1922–2011)

- Օհան Դուրյան
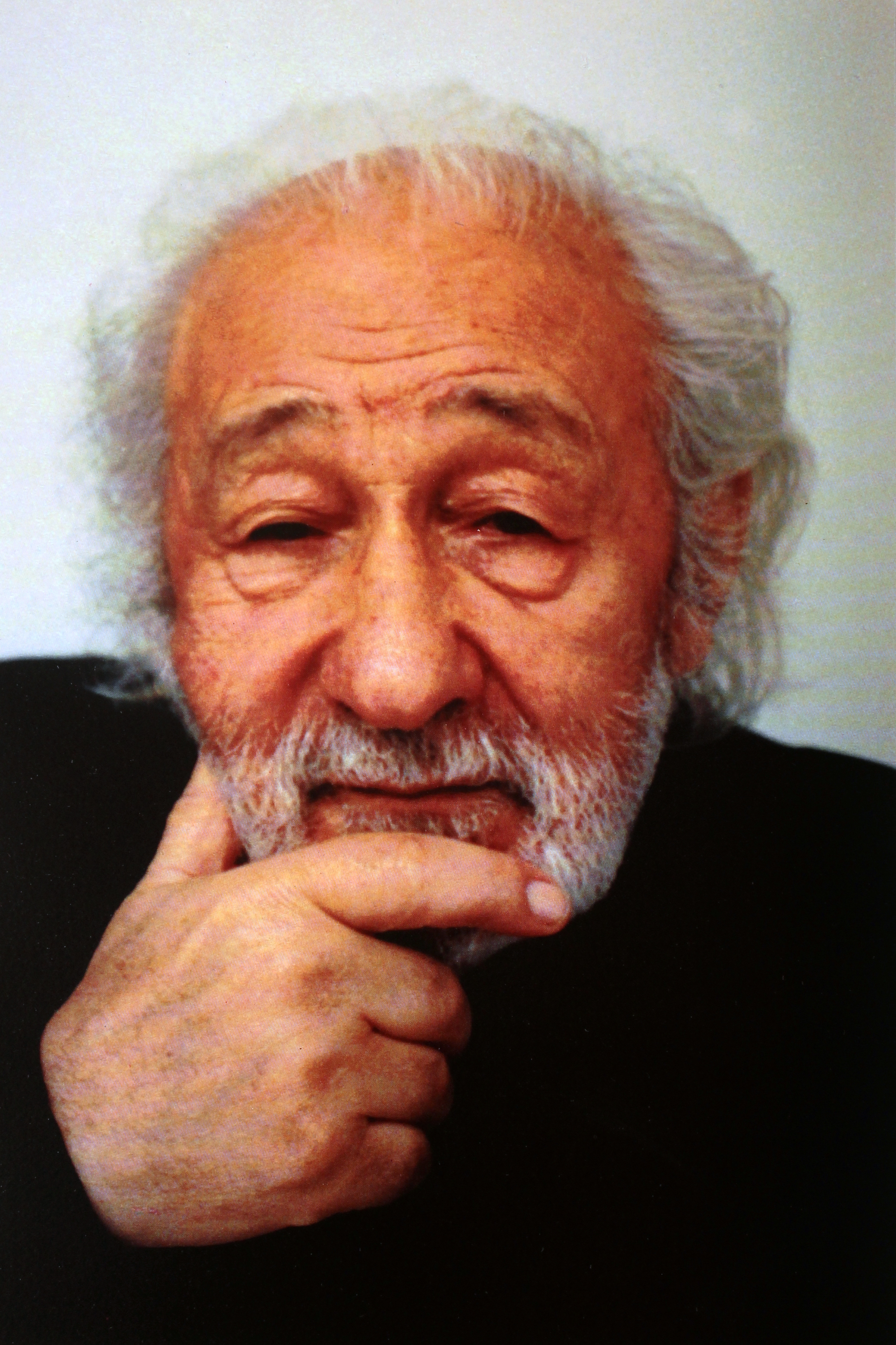
- Born: 8 September 1922; Jerusalem, Mandatory Palestine
- Died: 6 January 2011 (aged 88); Yerevan, Armenia
- Occupations: Conductor; Composer
- Spouse: Alice Shahmiryan
- Awards: People's Artist of the Armenian Soviet Socialist Republic (1967); State Award of the ASSR
- Musical career
- Genres: Classical
- Years active: 1939–2011

Ohan Durian or Duryan (Armenian: Օհան Դուրյան; September 8, 1922, Jerusalem - January 6, 2011, Yerevan) was an Armenian conductor and composer.

== Life and career ==
Ohan Durian was born Hanna Khatchadurian in Jerusalem. From 1939 to 1945 he studied composition, conducting and organ at the Jerusalem Conservatory. He completed his education in Europe under the tutelage of Hermann Scherchen, Roger Désormière and Jean Martinon.

After graduating, he toured Europe, performing with several orchestras, and worked as a music teacher at Birzeit University between 1944 and 1946. In 1957 he settled in Armenia at the invitation of Catholicos Vazgen I, and in 1959-65 and 1972-1974 he was conductor of the Armenian State Philharmonic Society.

Due to Soviet restrictions on artistic expression, he left Armenia for Europe, and from 1963 to 1968 he served as music director of the Leipzig Opera and was guest conductor of the Gewandhaus Orchestra. He also worked with other orchestras including the Avignon and Cape Town orchestras. From 1971 to 1972 he was the conductor of Yerevan State Opera and Ballet Theater and finally left Soviet Armenia in 1975.

In 1991 Armenia gained independence, and in the same year Durian returned to serve as the artistic director and principal conductor of the Ohan Durian Radio & TV Symphony Orchestra, which he founded, and as principal conductor and artistic director of the Yerevan Opera Theatre. He was forced into retirement in Armenia, but from 2002 to 2006 he directed the Moscow Symphonic Orchestra at the Stas Namin Center. Durian invented a musical system which he called Universalism and composed a number of songs and works for orchestra.

Durian married Alice Shahmiryan.

He was awarded the title of People's Artist of the Armenian Soviet Socialist Republic (1967) and the State Award of the ASSR.

== Later life and death ==
In later years, he was a vocal critic of the Armenian government, and appeared at opposition rallies calling for the resignation of the regimes of Robert Kocharyan and Serzh Sargsyan.

He died in Yerevan and was buried at the Komitas Pantheon in Yerevan. The memorial is unique and made of several layers of thick curved glass. However, due to severe weather conditions water has penetrated between the hermetically sealed layers and damaged the glass.

== Works ==
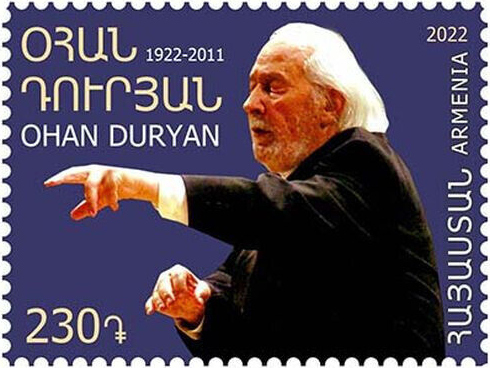
Durian on a 2022 stamp of Armenia

Selected compositions include:

- Komitasakan
- L'Arménienne
- Pastorale 3

In many instances Durian was the first conductor to perform symphonic works by Armenian composers. He also made numerous recordings throughout his career.
