= Vardan Mamikonian (musician) =

Armenian-born French pianist

Vardan Mamikonian is an Armenian pianist, and also a naturalised French citizen.

Mamikonian was born in Armenia into a musical family. He began his piano studies at the Yerevan School of Music at the age of 6. He continued his studies at the Moscow Conservatory and at the prestigious Tchaikovsky Conservatory where he became a student of Valery Kastelsky, the last pupil of legendary teacher Heinrich Neuhaus. Further studies followed with Russian virtuoso Lazar Berman, and in 1981 he was awarded First Prize at the Balis Dvarionas Piano Competition in Vilnius. More first prizes followed - in 1990 at the Lefébure Competition in Saint-Germain-en-Laye and in 1992 at the World Music Masters Competition in Monte Carlo, reserved exclusively for winners of international competitions. In 1991 Mamikonian emigrated to France and has since made his home in Paris.

Vardan Mamikonian has appeared the USA with Robert Spano and the Atlanta Symphony Orchestra playing Sergei Rachmaninov’s Concerto No 1; with the San Francisco Symphony Orchestra (Tchaikovsky's Concerto No. 1), Detroit Symphony Orchestra (S. Rachmaninov's Paganini Variations and Lupolianski's Paganini Variations), Pacific Symphony Orchestra (Tchaikovsky's Concerto No. 1), and National Symphony Orchestra (S. Rachmaninov's Concerto No. 4), and with the Los Angeles Philharmonic Orchestra at the Hollywood Bowl (S. Rachmaninov Concertos No. 1 and 4.).

Highlights of recent seasons include a recital on the International Piano Series at London’s Royal Festival Hall; performances of Franz Liszt's Concerto No. 1 in Turin with Eliahu Inbal, with the Berliner Symphoniker, and with the Charleston Symphony and David Stahl; two F. Liszt concertos at the St. Moritz Festival in Switzerland; the opening and closing concerts of the Festival d'Antibes; concerts in Montréal with I Musici de Montréal; and recitals in Los Angeles, at Davies Symphony Hall in San Francisco, in Seattle, and at the Kennedy Center. He made a return visit to London’s Wigmore Hall, and toured with the Prague Symphony performing concertos by S. Rachmaninov and Chopin. Other upcoming recital and orchestral engagements include additional performances of the S. Rachmaninov's Paganini Variations and the Chopin Piano Concerti Nos. 1 and 2 with orchestras in Italy, Germany and Sweden.

Mamikonian has played recitals at the Musikverein in Vienna, at the Carnegie Hall in New York, the Théâtre des Champs-Élysées in Paris, the Herkulessaal in Munich, Wigmore Hall in London, the Tonhalle in Zurich, at Davies Symphony Hall in San Francisco and at the Kennedy Center in Washington D.C., among others. Other engagements have included performances as soloist in Germany and Holland with the Kirov Orchestra, performances at the Grande Theatre Shanghai, the Leipzig Gewandhaus, the Salle Pleyel in Paris, the Philharmonie in Munich, the Alte Oper in Frankfurt, under conductors such as Valery Gergiev, Andrey Boreyko, Vladimir Fedoseev, Robert Spano, Miguel Harth-Bedoya, Eliahu Inbal and Leonard Slatkin.

Vardan Mamikonian has recorded extensively for radio and television and has made also numerous recordings for the German label Orfeo. Several of these recordings have received awards from the international press. During the season 2015–2016 Vardan Mamikonian appeared in prestigious concert series in France, Italy, Sweden, Switzerland and Germany.
