= Vuy Aman =

Single by Sirusho
- Released: June 9, 2017
- Recorded: 2017
- Genre: Pop
- Length: 3:23
- Label: Sirusho Production
- Songwriters: Sirusho, Sebu Simanian

Sirusho singles chronology
"Der Zor" (2017)	"'Vuy Aman'" (2017)	"Huh-Hah" (2017)

Music video
- "Vuy Aman" on YouTube

"Vuy Aman" (Armenian: Վույ Աման) is 2017 song by the Armenian pop singer Sirusho featuring the Armenian-American singer, songwriter Sebu Simonian from Capital Cities.

== Background ==
"Vuy Aman" is sung in Armenian and English. This is the first collaboration of Armenian Pop singer Sirusho and Armenian-American singer, songwriter, lead singer one half of the Los-Angeles based indie pop duo Capital Cities Sebu Simonian. It is a dual language love song about the complexities of a passionate pan-national relationship between LAX to EVN. It was released on June 9 and immediately became number 1 hit on Armenian iTunes. After a month on July 5 the official music video released. In September on Sirusho's Official YouTube channel Two official remix versions of the song were released.

== Music video ==
The music video was premiered on July 9. It was shot in Armenia and in Los Angeles. It's about two characters having flashback memories about each other. In the first scene Sebu is walking alone in the streets of Los Angeles. In the second scene it is Sirusho on backseat of pink cabriolet. At the end duo unites playing some traditional Armenian games and eating Armenian dishes. The scene ends with Sirusho and Sebu wearing Armenian traditional head accessories.

== Vuy Aman Stickers ==
At the end of August Sirusho launched "Vuy Aman" free stickers and frame packages. Stickers include stylish accessories, hair and head attributes, travel frames and more.
