= Kangaroo Court (song) =

Single by Capital Cities

from the album In a Tidal Wave of Mystery
- Released: March 27, 2012
- Recorded: 2011
- Genre: Synth-pop; indie pop
- Length: 3:43
- Label: Lazy Hooks; Capitol
- Songwriter(s): Ryan Merchant; Sebu Simonian
- Producer(s): Ryan Merchant; Sebu Simonian

Capital Cities singles chronology
| "Safe and Sound" (2011) | "Kangaroo Court" (2012) | "I Sold My Bed, But Not My Stereo" (2013) |

"Kangaroo Court" is a song by American indie pop duo Capital Cities. The song was released as a digital download in the United States on March 27, 2012, and serves as the second single from the duo's debut album In a Tidal Wave of Mystery. It was mainly written by Sebu Simonian with the help of Ryan Merchant.

== Music video ==
Capital Cities members Ryan Merchant and Sebu Simonian co-directed the music video with Carlos Lopez Estrada. The video was released on YouTube on September 5, 2013. The video features appearances from Darren Criss, Shannon Woodward, and Channing Holmes. The story tells of a zebra (Merchant), who has been forbidden from a club called The Kangaroo Court. Attempting entry disguised as a horse, he falls for a lapdog (Woodward). Her date that night, a bulldog (Criss), becomes jealous and send his henchmen to reveal the zebra for who he actually is. The zebra is placed under arrest for his crime and sent to court to face a kangaroo judge (Holmes). He is found guilty immediately and is executed, and later eaten, by a lion (Simonian).

A lyric video was published on YouTube on October 29, 2013.

An extended cut of the video was released in 2022.

== Track listing ==
- Digital download (single)
1. "Kangaroo Court" – 3:43
- Digital download (EP) 2014 Lion and Zebra sentence on cover image
1. "Kangaroo Court" (radio edit) – 3:22
2. "Kangaroo Court" (Robert DeLong remix) – 2:57
3. "Stayin' Alive" – 4:04
4. "One Minute More"* – 3:38
5. "Kangaroo Court" (Shook remix) – 4:10
6. "Kangaroo Court" (Forever Kid remix) – 4:42
- Digital download (EP) 2012 Judge Kangaroo and his hammer on cover image
1. "Kangaroo Court" – 3:43
2. "Kangaroo Court" (Shook Remix) – 4:09
3. "New Town Crier" original song – 3:22
4. "New Town Crier" (Napoleon Remix) – 3:31

Notes

- "One Minute More" is omitted from the April 1, 2014 re-issue of the digital EP.

== Remixes ==
In October 2013, Capital Cities, Fitz and the Tantrums, and DJ Earworm released a mash-up song entitled "Kangaroo League", which combined "Kangaroo Court" with Capital Cities' previous single "Safe and Sound" and Fitz and the Tantrums' "Out of My League", to promote the two groups' joint "Bright Futures" tour.

== Charts ==
Weekly chart performance for "Kangaroo Court"
| Chart (2013) | Peak position |
|---|---|
| Germany (GfK) | 81 |
| Mexico Airplay (Billboard) | 41 |
| US Hot Rock & Alternative Songs (Billboard) | 50 |

== Certifications ==
Certifications for "Kangaroo Court"
| Region | Certification | Certified units/sales |
|---|---|---|
| Brazil (Pro-Música Brasil) | Gold | 30,000^{‡} |
^{‡} Sales+streaming figures based on certification alone.

== Release history ==
Release dates for "Kangaroo Court"
| Region | Date | Format | Label |
|---|---|---|---|
| United States | March 27, 2012 | Digital download | EMI |
| United States | August 6, 2013 | Modern rock radio | Lazy Hooks, Capitol Records |
| Canada | December 17, 2013 | Digital download (EP) | Capitol Records |
| Italy | January 24, 2014 | Contemporary hit radio | Capitol Records |
| Canada | April 1, 2014 | Digital download (EP) | Capitol Records |
| United States | April 1, 2014 | Digital download (EP) | Capitol Records |
