= Solarize =

2018 indie pop album

Studio album by Capital Cities
- Released: August 10, 2018
- Recorded: 2015–2018
- Genre: Synth-disco
- Length: 50:00
- Label: Lazy Hooks; Capitol
- Producer: Ryan Merchant; Sebu Simonian

Capital Cities chronology
Swimming Pool Summer (2017)	Solarize (2018)

Singles from Solarize
- 1. "Vowels" Released: September 16, 2016; 2. "My Name is Mars" Released: March 30, 2018; 3. "Venus & River" Released: July 13, 2018; 4. "Levitate" Released: July 20, 2018; 5. "Just Say When" Released: July 26, 2018; 6. "Space" Released: August 2, 2018

Solarize is the second studio album of American indie pop duo Capital Cities, released on August 10, 2018, under Capitol Records. It was preceded by the 2017 EP Swimming Pool Summer, of which five of the tracks were integrated on this release. The album includes a collaboration with Rick Ross, who had previously expressed an interest in signing the duo before the release of their debut album In a Tidal Wave of Mystery in 2013.

== Critical reception ==
Professional ratings
Review scores
Source	Rating
AllMusic	4/5 stars

Neil Z. Yeung of AllMusic wrote that the "sun-washed set of futuristic synth-disco positively shimmers, providing an ideal soundtrack to smooth romancing and sweaty body-moving", finding it to be "less indie-precious" than their debut album and that it "smooths the digital edge of their early sound in favor of warm tones, hypnotic beats, and a focus on a full album experience as opposed to a collection of singles".

== Track listing ==
All tracks are written by Ryan Merchant and Sebu Simonian, with additional writers noted,.

Solarize track listing
No.	Title	Writer(s)	Length
1.	"Space"		3:04
2.	"Swimming Pool Summer"	Tim Pagnotta	3:32
3.	"My Name Is Mars"		3:11
4.	"Venus & River"	Sam Hollander	3:05
5.	"Levitate"	Marcos Kostenbader Valle; Paulo Sergio Kostenbader Valle	3:10
6.	"Drop Everything"	Simon Wilcox	3:10
7.	"Just Say When"	Rodney Jerkins	3:11
8.	"Girl Friday"		3:05
9.	"Gatekeeper Julie" (featuring Jim Svejda)		2:53
10.	"Only If You Want It"		3:32
11.	"Drifting"		3:16
12.	"Sunburn Surrender"		3:11
13.	"Vowels"	Brett McLaughlin; Jamie Michael Robert Sanderson	3:04
14.	"Good Enough"		2:18
15.	"Girl Friday" (featuring Rick Ross)	Rick Ross	3:07
16.	"Swimming Pool Summer" (HCSRS Remix)		3:58
Total length:			50:00

== Personnel ==
=== Featured artists ===
- Sebu Simonian – vocals (tracks 1–14), programming (tracks 1–12, 14)
- Ryan Merchant – vocals (tracks 1–14), programming (tracks 1–10, 12, 14), guitar (tracks 3, 11), bass (tracks 3, 11)
- Jim Svejda – voiceover (track 9)

=== Additional musicians ===
- Aaron Prather – drums (tracks 2, 7)
- Nick Merwin – guitar (tracks 2, 7, 13)
- Will Artope – trumpet (tracks 2, 6–8, 13)
- Artyom Manukyan – cello (track 2)
- Manny Quintero – bass (tracks 2, 7–8, 12–13)
- Sacha – rap vocalist (track 3)
- Jacob Scesney – saxophone (tracks 4, 10)
- Adam Friedman – bass (track 5), guitar (track 5)
- Justin Thomas – vibraphone (track 7)
- Anna Margo – vocals (track 8)
- Krikor Sarafian – guitar (track 8)
- Channing Holmes – drums (track 12)

=== Production ===
- Sebu Simonian – production
- Ryan Merchant – production
- Adam Friedman – co-production (track 3), additional production (track 5)
- The Ceasars – co-production (track 6)
- Rodney "Darkchild" Jerkins – co-production (track 7)
- Sermstyle – additional production (track 13)
- Serban Ghenea – mixer (track 13)
- John Hanes – assistant mixer (track 13)
- Andrew Mendelson – mastering (tracks 1–12, 14)
- Mike Marsh – mastering (track 13)
- João Lauro Fonte – artwork
