= Safe and Sound (Capital Cities song) =

2011 single by Capital Cities

Single by Capital Cities

from the album In a Tidal Wave of Mystery
- Released: January 6, 2011
- Studio: Stereotrain Studios (Burbank, CA)
- Genre: Synth-pop; new wave; dance-pop; alternative rock
- Length: 3:13
- Label: Lazy Hooks; Capitol
- Songwriters: Ryan Merchant; Sebu Simonian
- Producers: Ryan Merchant; Sebu Simonian

Capital Cities singles chronology
"Beginnings" (2010)	"Safe and Sound" (2011)	"Kangaroo Court" (2012)

Music video
- "Safe and Sound" on YouTube

"Safe and Sound" is a song by the American indie pop duo Capital Cities, written and produced by band members Ryan Merchant and Sebu Simonian. The song was originally released on January 6, 2011, and first appeared on their debut EP Capital Cities (2011), later serving as the lead single on May 17, 2013, from their first studio album, In a Tidal Wave of Mystery (2013). "Safe and Sound" became the duo's breakout hit, peaking at number 8 on the United States Billboard Hot 100 and achieving commercial success in several other territories. Three music videos were produced for the single, with the third video, directed by Grady Hall and set in the Los Angeles Theatre, being nominated for Best Music Video at the 56th Annual Grammy Awards.

== Background and composition ==
"Safe and Sound" is a synth-pop, new wave, dance-pop, and alternative rock song, and was written and produced by Capital Cities members Ryan Merchant and Sebu Simonian. It features a prominent trumpet line, which was only incorporated into its production after eight previous takes of the song.

Sheet music for the song is entirely in the key of C major with a metronome of 116–120 beats per minute in common time.

== Music videos ==
The first music video for "Safe and Sound" was self-produced and edited by the band and uploaded to their official YouTube account on February 24, 2011. It features alternating historical film clips of dancing and war from the last century generally arranged in chronological order. Another video, directed by Jimmy Ahlander, was released on October 21 on Vimeo, depicting the duo being led through a junkyard by a monk.

The third and most well-known video for the song was directed by Grady Hall and released on April 25, 2013. The video is set in the Los Angeles Theatre and depicts Capital Cities performing on stage as dancers of all types (1940s swing dancers, 1970s roller-disco skaters, 1990s hip-hop dancers, etc.) emerge from pictures on the wall and film clips from different time periods in the theater's history come to life and compete in dance-offs. It received a nomination in the Best Music Video category at the 56th Annual Grammy Awards.

== Cover versions and in other media ==
On November 7, 2013, the song was performed by Team Adam (consisted of Tessanne Chin, James Wolpert, Will Champlin, Grey and Preston Pohl) from the fifth season of the series, The Voice.

Zendaya, Kina Grannis, Kurt Hugo Schneider and Max Schneider released a cover of the song on March 31, 2014, used for a Coca-Cola commercial. Coca-Cola bottles served as instruments in the version. The cover was later revised in January 2025 following the Eaton Fire in Los Angeles.

Barcelona's Institute for Research in Biomedicine (IRB) has used it in its dance video to raise awareness and support for research into diseases such as cancer and metastasis, Alzheimer's and diabetes.

Beginning in July 2021, the song was used in an advertising campaign for ADT Home Security titled "It's Safe To Say", which featured Drew and Jonathan Scott from the HGTV series Property Brothers.

== Commercial performance ==
"Safe and Sound" first gained commercial success in Germany following its use in a Vodafone commercial, later topping the German Media Control singles chart. It peaked at number 8 on the Billboard Hot 100 in September 2013, over two-and-a-half years after its initial release. It sold over two million copies in the United States by January 2014. It also reached number 1 on Alternative Airplay and number 2 on both the Adult Top 40 and Mainstream Top 40 charts. In the United Kingdom, the single was added to the BBC Radio 2 playlist on August 31, 2013; following its official single release in the country the following month, it peaked at number 42 on the UK Singles Chart.

In September 2023, for the 35th anniversary of Alternative Airplay, Billboard published a list of the 100 most successful songs in the chart's history; "Safe and Sound" was ranked at number 53.

== Awards and nominations ==
Year	Awards	Category	Result
2013	MTV Video Music Awards	Best Visual Effects	Won
2013	MTV Video Music Awards	Best Art Direction	Nominated
2014	Grammy Awards	Best Music Video	Nominated
2014	World Music Awards	World's Best Song	Nominated
2014	World Music Awards	World's Best Video	Nominated
2014	Billboard Music Awards	Top Rock Song	Nominated

== Track listing ==
- Digital download (single)
1. "Safe and Sound" – 3:12
- Digital download (remix EP)
1. "Safe and Sound" (RAC Mix) – 4:12
2. "Safe and Sound" (Cash Cash Remix) – 5:26
3. "Safe and Sound" (Alexis Troy Remix) – 2:52
4. "Safe and Sound" (Gainsford Remix) – 5:30
5. "Safe and Sound" (DJ Politik Remix) – 5:22
6. "Safe and Sound" (Tommie Sunshine & Live City Remix) – 5:53
7. "Safe and Sound" (Markus Schulz vs. Grube & Hovsepian Remix) – 7:48
- CD single (Germany)
1. "Safe and Sound" – 3:12
2. "Safe and Sound" (Tommie Sunshine & Live City Remix) – 5:53
- 11th Anniversary Bundle (remix EP)
1. "Safe and Sound" (Jonah Walsh Remix) – 2:31
2. "Safe and Sound" (Morgan Phillips Remix) – 2:41
3. "Safe and Sound" (Rubic & QTNT Remix) – 2:58
4. "Safe and Sound" (ZIFRIOS & AnyMoreZ "Hardstyle" Remix) – 3:08
5. "Safe and Sound" (AddYourOwnParts Redux) – 3:09
6. "Safe and Sound" (Jonah Walsh & Sebu Ողջ Առողջ Remake) – 2:31
7. "Safe and Sound" (Milk N Cooks Dub Remix) – 4:23

== Charts ==
=== Weekly charts ===
2012–2014 weekly chart performance for "Safe and Sound"
Chart (2012–2014)	Peak position
Australia (ARIA)	16
Austria (Ö3 Austria Top 40)	2
Belgium (Ultratop 50 Flanders)	28
Belgium (Ultratop 50 Wallonia)	26
Brazil (Billboard Brasil Hot 100)	56
Brazil Hot Pop Songs	22
Canada Hot 100 (Billboard)	5
CIS Airplay (TopHit)	1
Czech Republic Airplay (ČNS IFPI)	6
Czech Republic Singles Digital (ČNS IFPI)	65
Denmark (Tracklisten)	18
Finland (Suomen virallinen radiolista)	31
France (SNEP)	15
Germany (GfK)	1
Hungary (Rádiós Top 40)	33
Ireland (IRMA)	13
Israel International Airplay (Media Forest)	2
Italy (FIMI)	4
Italy Airplay (EarOne)	1
Japan Hot 100 (Billboard)	61
Luxembourg Digital Song Sales (Billboard)	2
Mexico (Billboard Ingles Airplay)	1
Mexico Anglo (Monitor Latino)	2
Netherlands (Dutch Top 40)	29
Netherlands (Single Top 100)	39
Poland Airplay (ZPAV)	3
Portugal Digital Song Sales (Billboard)	2
Russia Airplay (TopHit)	1
San Marino (SMRRTV Top 50)	1
Slovakia Airplay (ČNS IFPI)	14
Slovakia Singles Digital (ČNS IFPI)	70
Slovenia (SloTop50)	7
Spain (Promusicae)	15
Sweden (Sverigetopplistan)	28
Switzerland (Schweizer Hitparade)	8
UK Singles (Official Charts)	42
Ukraine Airplay (TopHit)	5
US Billboard Hot 100	8
US Adult Contemporary (Billboard)	11
US Adult Pop Airplay (Billboard)	2
US Dance Club Songs (Billboard)	32
US Dance Airplay (Billboard)	9
US Hot Rock & Alternative Songs (Billboard)	2
US Pop Airplay (Billboard)	2
US Rhythmic Airplay (Billboard)	33
Venezuela Pop Rock General (Record Report)	1

2026 weekly chart performance for "Safe and Sound"
Chart (2026)	Peak position
Lithuania Airplay (TopHit)	100

=== Year-end charts ===
2013 year-end chart performance for "Safe and Sound"
Chart (2013)	Position
Austria (Ö3 Austria Top 40)	18
Brazil Airplay (Crowley)	69
Canada (Canadian Hot 100)	28
France (SNEP)	71
Germany (Official German Charts)	8
Italy (FIMI)	35
Italy Airplay (EarOne)	3
Netherlands (Dutch Top 40)	155
Russia Airplay (TopHit)	37
Switzerland (Schweizer Hitparade)	42
Ukraine Airplay (TopHit)	62
US Billboard Hot 100	29
US Adult Contemporary (Billboard)	41
US Adult Top 40 (Billboard)	19
US Dance/Mix Show Airplay (Billboard)	20
US Hot Rock Songs (Billboard)	4
US Mainstream Top 40 (Billboard)	16

2014 year-end chart performance for "Safe and Sound"
Chart (2014)	Position
Brazil Airplay (Crowley)	86
Canada (Canadian Hot 100)	59
France (SNEP)	173
Russia Airplay (TopHit)	27
Slovenia (SloTop50)	18
Ukraine Airplay (TopHit)	48
US Adult Contemporary (Billboard)	35
US Hot Rock Songs (Billboard)	17

Year-end chart performance
Chart (2025)	Position
Argentina Anglo Airplay (Monitor Latino)	91

=== Decade-end charts ===
Decade-end chart performance for "Safe and Sound"
Chart (2010–2019)	Position
US Hot Rock Songs (Billboard)	47

== Certifications ==
Certifications and sales for "Safe and Sound"
Region	Certification	Certified units/sales
Australia (ARIA)	Platinum	70,000^{^}
Austria (IFPI Austria)	Gold	15,000^{*}
Brazil (Pro-Música Brasil)	Diamond	250,000^{‡}
Canada (Music Canada)	5× Platinum	400,000^{‡}
Germany (BVMI)	5× Gold	750,000^{‡}
Italy (FIMI)	2× Platinum	60,000^{‡}
Mexico (AMPROFON)	2× Platinum	120,000^{*}
New Zealand (RMNZ)	3× Platinum	90,000^{‡}
Spain (Promusicae)	2× Platinum	120,000^{‡}
Sweden (GLF)	2× Platinum	80,000^{‡}
Switzerland (IFPI Switzerland)	Gold	15,000^{^}
United Kingdom (BPI)	Platinum	600,000^{‡}
United States (RIAA)	6× Platinum	6,000,000^{‡}
Streaming
Denmark (IFPI Danmark)	Platinum	1,800,000^{†}
Spain (Promusicae)	Platinum	8,000,000^{†}
^{*} Sales figures based on certification alone.^{^} Shipments figures based on certification alone.^{‡} Sales+streaming figures based on certification alone.^{†} Streaming-only figures based on certification alone.

== Release history ==
Release dates for "Safe and Sound"
Region	Date	Format	Label
United States	January 12, 2011	Digital download	Lazy Hooks
United States	January 14, 2013	Modern rock radio	Capitol
United States	February 4, 2013	Adult album alternative radio	Capitol
United States	April 2, 2013	Contemporary hit radio	Capitol
Germany	April 5, 2013	Digital download (remix EP)	Lazy Hooks; Capitol
Canada	April 16, 2013	Digital download (remix EP)	Lazy Hooks; Capitol
United States	April 16, 2013	Digital download (remix EP)	Lazy Hooks; Capitol
Germany	May 17, 2013	Compact disc	Capitol
Italy	June 14, 2013	Contemporary hit radio	EMI
Australia	June 21, 2013	Digital download	Lazy Hooks; Capitol
New Zealand	June 21, 2013	Digital download	Lazy Hooks; Capitol
Australia	August 16, 2013	Digital download (remix EP)	Lazy Hooks; Capitol
New Zealand	August 16, 2013	Digital download (remix EP)	Lazy Hooks; Capitol
United States	August 19, 2013	Rhythmic contemporary radio	Capitol
United Kingdom	September 20, 2013	Digital download (remix EP)	Lazy Hooks; Capitol
