= Sirusho =

Armenian singer and songwriter (born 1987)

- Սիրուշո
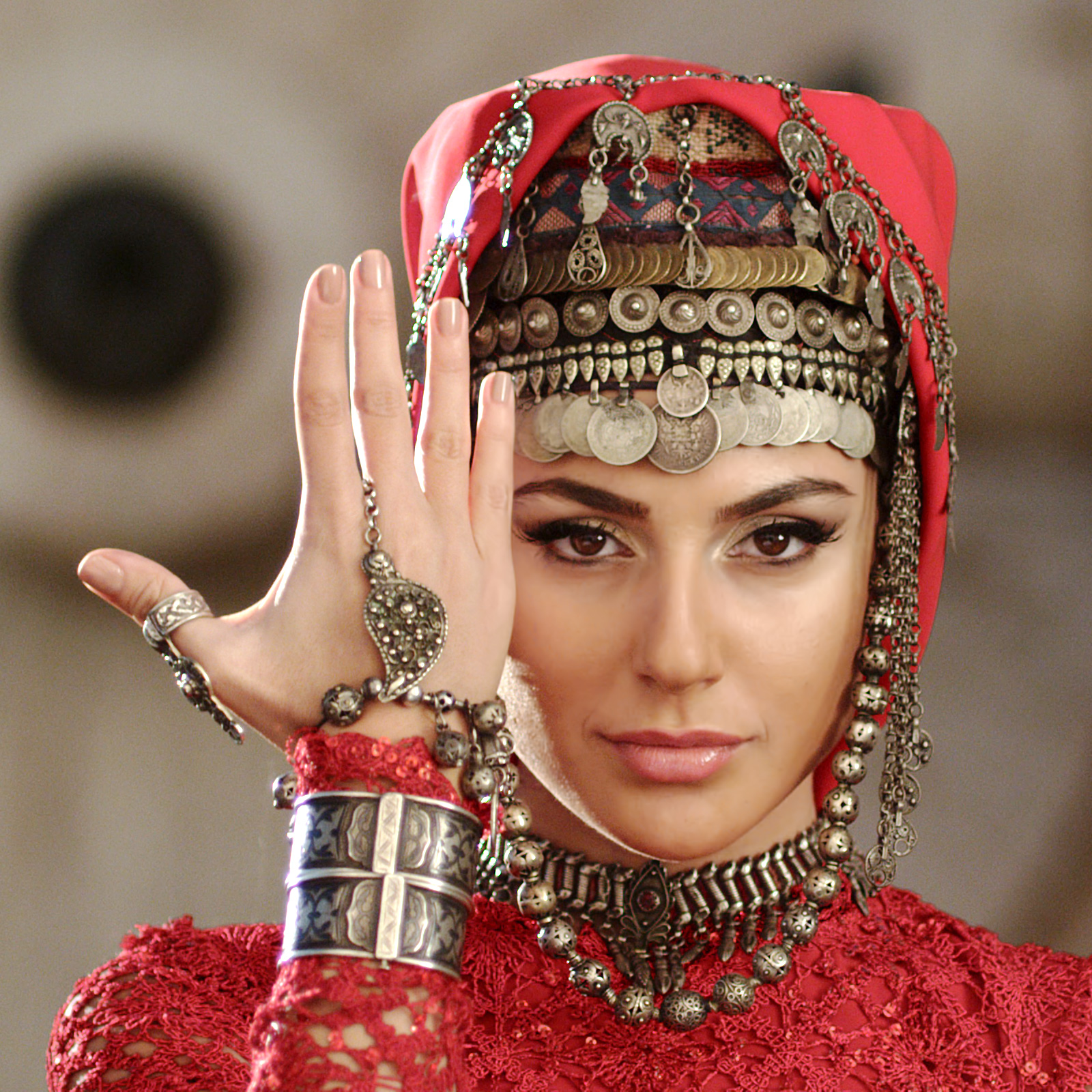
- Sirusho in the music video for "PreGomesh" in 2012
- Born: Siranush Harutyunyan; 7 January 1987 (age 39); Yerevan, Armenian SSR, Soviet Union
- Occupations: Singer; songwriter; jewelry designer
- Years active: 1995–present
- Height: 172 cm (5 ft 8 in)
- Spouse: Levon Kocharyan (m. 2009)
- Children: 3
- Parents: Hrachya Harutyunyan (father); Syuzan Margaryan (mother)
- Website: sirusho.com

Siranush Hrachyayi Harutyunyan (Armenian: Սիրանուշ Հրաչյայի Հարությունյան; born 7 January 1987), known professionally as Sirusho (Armenian: Սիրուշո), is an Armenian singer and songwriter. She received her first award when she was nine years old for her song "Lusabats". Sirusho's first studio album, Sirusho, was released in 2000 followed by the second album Sheram in 2005. In the same year, she was awarded the Future of Armenian Music, Best Album and Best Female Performer awards in the first Armenian National Music Awards.

Sirusho reached international recognition after representing Armenia in the Eurovision Song Contest 2008 with her co-written song "Qélé, Qélé" in Belgrade, Serbia. The song finished fourth in the final and became a hit in Europe. The BBC described her as "national treasure" of Armenia during the contest.

In 2012, Sirusho released the single "PreGomesh", which inspired her to launch a range of handcrafted silver jewelry of the same name, representing Armenian culture and craftsmanship mixed with modern fashion trends. Sirusho is the first Armenian artist to be twice-nominated at World Music Awards with "PreGomesh".

In 2013, W magazine featured Sirusho in their list of "6 un-American idols", with the author saying "the door is still open for Sirusho to introduce the world to a sound and language largely unknown in the West". In 2017, Sirusho was awarded with the title of Honored Artist of Armenia upon the decree of President Serzh Sargsyan. Sirusho's musical style reflects the Armenian traditional sounds mixed with modern music.

== Life and career ==
=== 1987–2004: Early life and career beginnings ===
Sirusho was born in Yerevan, Soviet Armenia, on January 7, 1987, to actor and director Hrachya Harutyunyan and singer Syuzan Margaryan, a popular singer from Armenia, in the 1980s–1990s.

When she was seven years old, Sirusho moved to Canada with her parents. In her documentary series ARMAT, she stated: "When I was 7 years old, I moved to Canada with my parents" and "Toronto became my second home." In Canada, she grew up attending the Arpi Nursery School in Toronto, founded by family friend Arpi Meras. Sirusho noted: "In Canada, I grew up in the school founded by her."

Her first appearance on stage was in Canada at age seven. As she recounted: "by the time I was 7 I was on stage in Canada." At the same age, she began writing her own music and lyrics in Armenian and English.

Sirusho won her first award as a child at the Armenian National Music Awards for her performance of "Lusabats", an Armenian folk song written in the early 20th century by Komitas. At age nine, she won another award at the Young Talents Contest for one of her own compositions. She released her first studio album, Sirusho, at age 13.

=== 2005–2009: Sheram and Hima ===
"I have worked and toured a lot this year, and even in a few hours after this event, I'll be flying to the U.S. for concerts, and i want to thank all of you for giving me the wings for all future flights in my life"

— Sirusho during the acceptance speech of her second "Best Female Artist Award" 2005 in Armenia

Although Sirusho mainly performed soul and pop for most of her career, she decided to work on an album of Armenian folk songs by gusan titled Sheram, which was released in 2005. The album also included the single "Shorora", which was very well received. In 2005, Sheram was awarded the Best Album of the Year award at the Armenian National Music Awards. Sirusho also won the "Best Female Artist of the Year" award.

In 2006, Varduhi Vardanyan, a renowned Armenian singer, died. Varduhi has been a close friend of Sirusho's since her childhood. After her death, Sirusho dedicated a song titled "Mez Vochinch Chi Bazhani" ("Nothing Will separate Us"), which is included in Sirusho's album "Hima" ("Now"), to Varduhi.

Also in 2006, Sirusho received the award for Best Female Artist of the Year at the Annual Armenian-Russian Diaspora Music Awards held in Moscow, Russia. A few days later, she released her single "Heranum em" (Armenian: Հեռանում եմ) (I am leaving), which soon became a hit. The single was included in Sirusho's album "Hima", which also includes "Arjani E", a track with singer Sofi Mkheyan. The album proved to be a breakthrough in Armenian music, unleashing a fresh wave of mixing soul music and R&B with traditional instruments such as duduk, dhol, and zurna. Sirusho won the "Best Female Artist of the Year" award at the Armenian Music Awards community at the Kodak Theatre in Hollywood. Sirusho received her fourth Best Female Artist award at the 2008 Armenian national Music Awards.

Sirusho - Qélé, _Qélé
The Armenian entry for Eurovision Song Contest 2008, Qélé, _Qélé became all time hit in Armenia, as well as in Europe

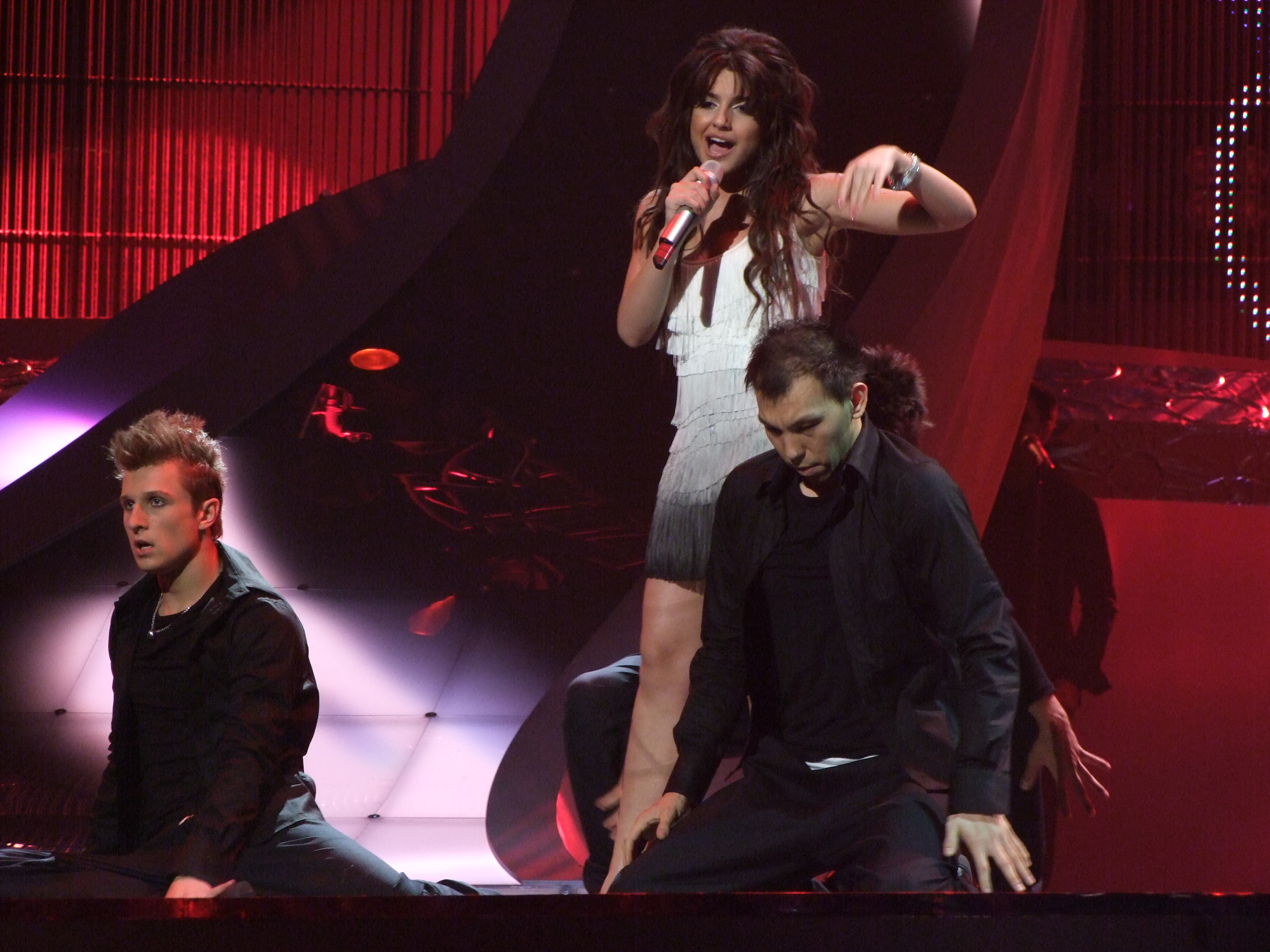
Sirusho performing Armenia's entry at the Eurovision Song Contest 2008

Sirusho was chosen to represent Armenia in the Eurovision Song Contest 2008. She performed "Qele Qele", which was co-produced by the Canadian Armenian composer DerHova. The song entered the first semi-final on May 20 and advanced to the final which took place on May 24, 2008 in Belgrade. Sirusho took the 4th place with 199 points, and still remains the only Armenian participant who has received the most number of 12 points. During the official after-party following the final, the four winners of the Marcel Bezençon Award 2008 were announced and prizes were given out. They presented a new Fan Award by Swedish website Gylleneskor.se. Readers of the site had the opportunity to vote online for their favorite 2008 artist. "Qélé, Qélé" became a hit for Eurovision Song Contest-following fans around the world, especially in Greek-speaking areas. The 'Yerevan Remix' version of the song was regularly played in Greek clubs, on London Greek Radio in the United Kingdom, and in an episode of the Greek and Cyprus X Factor television series.

On April 1, 2009, Sirusho released the song "Erotas"—also known as "Erotas Ksafnikos" (Sudden Love)—an up-tempo dance song with heavy traditional Greek laiko influence sung entirely in Greek. It was composed by singer Hayko and written by Natalia Germanou. Sirusho performed the song live at the Tashir Armenian Awards ceremony in April 2009. Erotas went on to become a number-one hit on the Armenian Singles Chart.

In 2009 Sirusho recorded a song dedicated to peace along with the participants of Eurovision 2008; Boaz Mauda and Jelena Tomasevic, representing Israel and Serbia, respectively. "Time To Pray" was released in May; its lyrics were written by the President of Israel, Shimon Peres.

=== 2010–2015: Havatum em and "PreGomesh" ===
In February 2010, Sirusho performed her new song Havatum em (I Believe) at the Armenian national selection for Eurovision Song Contest 2010. The lyrics and the music are written by Sirusho. At the end of February she was invited to Malta as a special guest to perform at the Maltese Eurovision selection. During the visit she appeared on local television shows and took part in the Maltese annual charity, performing Havatum em.

Sirusho's fourth official studio album, Havatum em, was released in mid-2010 along with new singles. The album includes previously released songs Erotas, the title track, Time to Pray, new songs, and songs she had written for the Armenian national final for Eurovision 2008. During an interview in Malta with esctoday.com, Sirusho was asked whether she would return to the Eurovision Song Contest; she said if people and her fanbase want her to, she will return to represent Armenia again.

In September 2011, the first single from Sirusho's upcoming studio album, "I Like It", was released on iTunes. The video was released on 11 November that year. On December 3, Sirusho was special guest in Junior Eurovision Song Contest 2011 held in Yerevan. She performed DerHova's Yerevan Remix of Qélé, Qélé.

Sirusho - "PreGomesh"
One of Sirusho's biggest hits.

On December 10, 2012, Sirusho unveiled the new single "PreGomesh", a dance track co-written by her and Avet Barseghyan. The song was inspired by an Armenian folk song "Lorva Gutanerg", which was preserved by Komitas. The video is reviving Armenian traditions and presenting them in a modern way. In the same month, Russian singer Grigory Leps released his new album featuring the song “Судьба Зима” written by Sirusho.

Sirusho and Sakis Rouvas announced they were to record and release a duet song "See" in October 2013. In 2014, she was nominated for The Best Armenian Singer, The Best Armenian Song and The Best Armenian Music Video at World Music Awards. Mixing traditions of different generations, Sirusho released the remake of "Tariner" (Armenian: Տարիներ) ("Years") with her compatriot Harout Pamboukjian. On November 9 Sirusho's first solo concert took place at Nokia Theater, Los Angeles, U.S.

In 2015 Sirusho released new song "Kga Mi Or" ("Where Were You") dedicated to the 100th anniversary of the Armenian Genocide. The song was released in Armenian and English, and both versions were available on iTunes. She also released a video for the song.

=== 2016–present: Armat ===
In January 2016, Sirusho released a new single "Mi Togh Indz Menak" (Do released Leave Me Alone) along with its music video. In August 2016 she performed live at Barclaycard Arena in Hamburg, Germany, and was announced as the Best Armenian Female Act at Daf BAMA Music Awards and performed Qele Qele (Remix version). In the same month Sirusho announced the upcoming release of her new album called Armat (Root) that would represent the Armenian culture. In 2017 Sirusho released a new summer hit song "Vuy Aman" together with Armenian-American singer, songwriter, Sebu Simonian of the Capital Cities band. She performed at the opening ceremony of the 2019 CONIFA European Football Cup in the de facto Republic of Artsakh. In 2021, Sirusho released a collaboration single titled "Stay" featuring Norwegian singer Alexander Rybak, who won the Eurovision Song Contest 2009.

In 2022, Sirusho has participation in the creation of foundation named after Armenian eminent and beloved artist Hayko. The purpose of Hayko Hakobyan foundation is to save and publish Hayko’s musical heritage. In August 2022, Sirusho has participated and sang during the concert dedicated to the celebration of Hayko's 49th birthday.

== Personal life ==
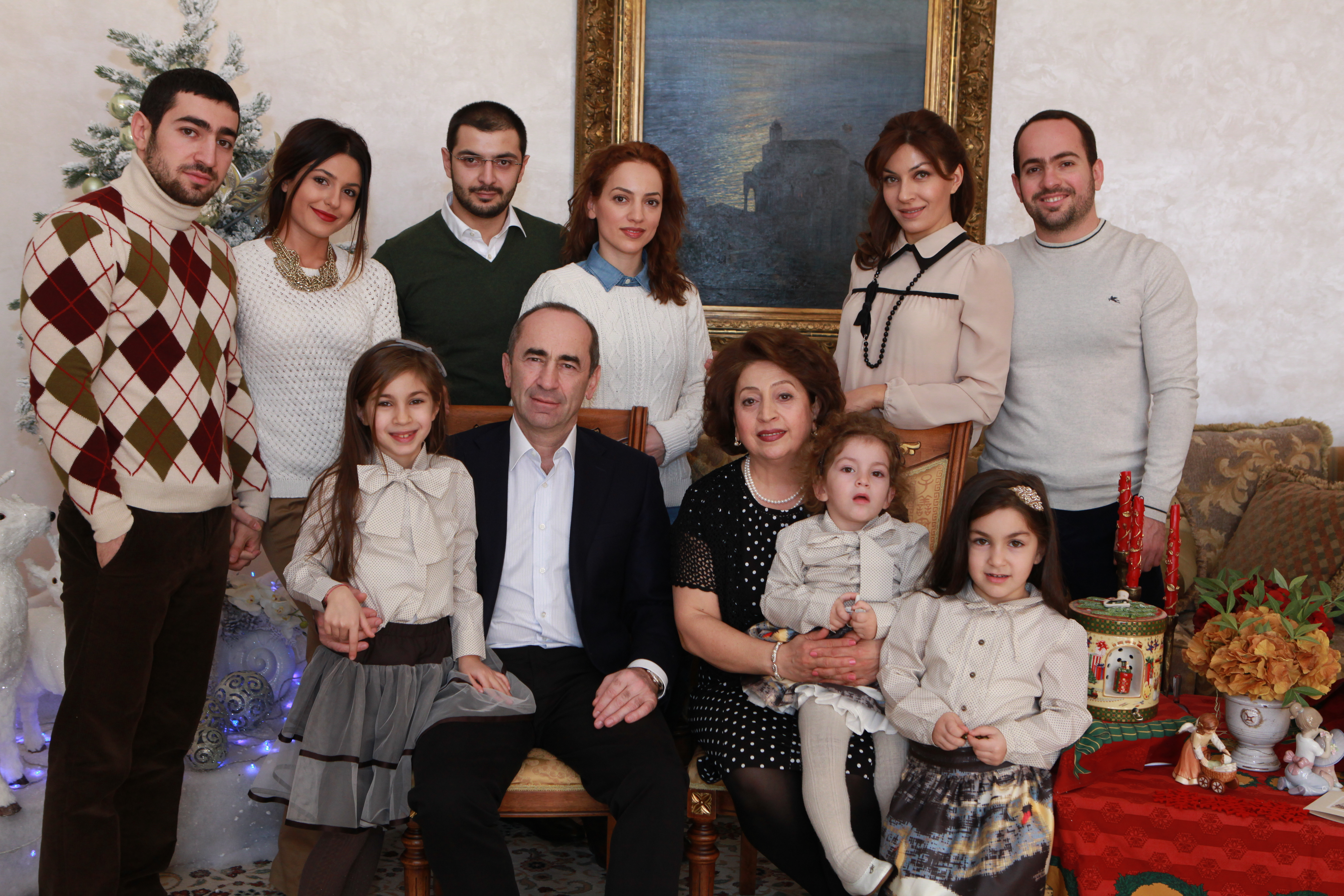
Sirusho (second from the left) with her husband's family

On June 6, 2009, Sirusho married Levon Kocharyan, the son of Armenia's second president Robert Kocharyan. Their first son, Robert, was born in the United States in 2014. They welcomed their second son, Michael, in May 2016. Their third child and first daughter, Zabelle, was born in the United States in June 2022.

== Views and activism ==
Sirusho endorsed Robert Kocharyan and the Armenia Alliance party in the 2021 Armenian parliamentary election, and performed on Kocharyan's behalf during his campaign.

She is a supporter of The Republic of Artsakh's independence. During the Eurovision Song Contest 2009, after the removal of an image of the We Are Our Mountains statue located in the capital city of Stepanakert from Armenia's introductory postcard, she taped a photo of the statue to her clipboard and stood in front of the statue's image while presenting Armenia’s votes. Following the display, The National Security Committee of Azerbaijan seized tele-voting records and interrogated forty-three Azerbaijani citizens that voted for Armenia that year. During the 2020 Nagorno-Karabakh War, she stated on social media that her husband was "in Artsakh" and she would be engaging in volunteer efforts at the border.

She supports global recognition of the Armenian Genocide, a common theme in her work. During a documentary series filmed in 2017, she detailed how she and her crew were forced to leave their recording equipment at the Armenian border and denied permits to film a music video for "Der Zor", a song about the Genocide, in Ani. The music video, as well as documentary footage covering its recording, was done on iPhones, sparking controversy in Turkey.

== Police search of her home and store ==
Sirusho's PreGomesh store in Yerevan was searched by authorities in August 2026 in relation to a large criminal case involving multiple members of her husband's family which included searches of her home and her brother-in-law's home and father-in-law's home.

== Discography ==
=== Studio albums ===
- Sirusho (2000)
- Sheram (2005)
- Hima (2007)
- Havatum Em (2010)
- Armat (2016)

=== Singles ===
| Year | Title |
|---|---|
| 2005 | "Shorora" (Armenian: Շորորա) |
| 2005 | "Sery Mer" (Սերը Մեր) |
| 2006 | "Mayrik" (Մայրիկ) |
| 2006 | "Heranum em" (Հեռանում եմ) |
| 2007 | "Hima" (Հիմա) |
| 2007 | "Arjani e" (Արժանի է) (featuring Sofi Mkheyan) |
| 2007 | "Mez Vochinch Chi Bajani" (Մեզ ոչինչ չի բաժանի) |
| 2008 | "Qélé, Qélé" |
| 2009 | "Erotas" |
| 2009 | "Time to Pray" (featuring Boaz Mauda and Jelena Tomasevic) |
| 2009 | "Alphabet" (featuring with Arsen Grigoryan) |
| 2010 | "Havatum Em" (Հավատում եմ) |
| 2011 | "I Like It" |
| 2012 | "PreGomesh" |
| 2013 | "See" (featuring Sakis Rouvas) |
| 2014 | "Antarber Ashkhar" (Անտարբեր Աշխարհ) |
| 2014 | "Tariner" (Տարիներ) (featuring Harout Pamboukjian) |
| 2015 | "Where were you" (Կգա մի օր) |
| 2016 | "Mi togh indz Menak" (Մի թող ինձ մենակ) |
| 2016 | "Zartonq" (Զարթոնք) |
| 2016 | "Der Zor" |
| 2017 | "Vuy Aman" (Վույ Աման) |
| 2019 | "Tightrope Walking" |
| 2019 | "Summer Love: Vuy Aman" |
| 2019 | "Zoma Zoma" |
| 2020 | "Yare Mardun Yara Kuta" (Յարը Մարդուն Յարա Կուտա) |

== Awards and nominations ==
| Year | Award | Category | City | Result |
|---|---|---|---|---|
| 2003 | Armenian National Music Awards | The Future of Armenian Music | Yerevan | Won |
| 2004 | Krunk Awards | Best Female Artist | Yerevan | Won |
| 2005 | Voske Qnar Awards | Best Song – "Sery mer" | Yerevan | Won |
| 2005 | Armenian National Music Awards | Best Album of the Year – "Shorora" | Yerevan | Won |
| 2005 | Armenian National Music Award | Best Female Artist of the Year | Yerevan | Won |
| 2005 | Annual Armenian-Russian Diaspora Music Awards (Tashir 2005) | Best Female Artist of the Year | Moscow | Won |
| 2006 | Annual Armenian-Russian Diaspora Music Award (Tashir 2006) | Best Female Artist of the Year | Moscow | Won |
| 2006 | Annual MCLUB AMVA Awards | Best Music Video" – "Mayrik" | United States | Won |
| 2007 | Armenian Music Awards (Anush) | Best Female Artist of the Year | United States | Won |
| 2007 | Top 10 Awards | Best Video" – "Hima" | Yerevan | Won |
| 2007 | Yes Magazine Awards | Princess of Armenian Music | Yerevan | Won |
| 2007 | Voske Qnar Awards | "Best Song" – "Heranum em" | Yerevan | Won |
| 2008 | Top 10 Awards | Best Music Video" – "Qele Qele" | Yerevan | Won |
| 2008 | Eurovision Song Contest | Eurovision Fan Award | Belgrade | Won |
| 2008 | Armenian National Music Awards | Best Female Artist of the Year | Yerevan | Won |
| 2009 | Annual Armenian-Russian Diaspora Music Award (Tashir 2009) | Best International Armenian Singer | Moscow | Won |
| 2010 | Armenian National Music Awards | Best Song – "Havatum Em" | Yerevan | Won |
| 2010 | Armenian National Music Awards | Best-Selling Album – "Havatum Em" | Yerevan | Won |
| 2010 | Luxury Awards | Best Singer" & "Best Media Star | Yerevan | Won |
| 2010 | Annual Armenian-Russian Diaspora Music Award (Tashir 2010) | Special award for spreading the Armenian music in Europe | Moscow | Won |
| 2011 | Van Music Awards | Special Award for Song | Yerevan | Won |
| 2012 | The Armenian Pulse Music Award | Best Female Artist | | Won |
| 2013 | The Armenian Music Awards | Best Performance – PreGomesh | Yerevan | Won |
| 2013 | World Armenian Entertainment Awards | Queen of Armenian Pop Music | LA, United States | Won |
| 2014 | The World Music Awards | World's Best Female Artist | Monte Carlo | Nominated |
| 2014 | The World Music Awards | World's Best Song PreGomesh | Monte Carlo | Nominated |
| 2014 | The World Music Awards | World's Best Music Video – "PreGomesh" | Monte Carlo | Nominated |
| 2015 | Armenian Pulse Music Awards | Best Duet (with Harout Pamboukjian) | Yerevan | Won |
| 2016 | DAF Bama Music Awards | The Best Armenian Female Act | Hamburg, Germany | Won |
| 2016 | STARS WORLD Entertainment Awards | Best female singer of the decade | Yerevan | Won |
| 2016 | Pan Armenian Entertainment Awards | Preacher of national values | LA | Won |
| 2017 | Armenian Europe Music Awards | Best Female Artist of the Year | France, Paris | Won |
| 2018 | Swallow Music Awards | Special Award | Yerevan | Won |
| 2019 | Distinctive International Arab Festivals Awards | Special Award | Dubai, UAE | Won |
| 2019 | Beirut International Awards Festivals | Special Prize | Beirut, Lebanon | Won |

Awards and achievements
| Preceded by Hayko with "Anytime You Need" | Armenia in the Eurovision Song Contest; 2008 | Succeeded by Inga and Anush with "Jan Jan" |
