= Where Were You (song) =

"Where Were You / Kga mi Or"

Single by Sirusho
- Released: 24 April 2015
- Recorded: 2015
- Genre: Armenian folk, pop,
- Length: 4:16
- Songwriters: Avet Barseghyan, Sirusho, Rama Duke, Elaine Staghikyan

Pregomesh singles chronology
"Tariner" (2014)	"Where Were You / Kga mi Or" (2015)	"Mi togh Indz Menak" (2016)

Music video
- "Where Were You" on YouTube

"Where Were You" (Armenian: Կգա մի օր) is 2015 song by Armenian singer Sirusho. It was released on 24 April 2015 as a single dedicated to the Armenian genocide centennial commemoration.

== Background ==
"Where Were You" (Kga Mi Or) is sung in Armenian and English. The song is dedicated to the centennial of The Armenian Genocide of 1915 and the official video of the song displays some shots from that event. Sirusho is the author of English lyrics that were co-written together with Rama Duke, Elaine Tsaghikyan, who wrote the first verse of the song. The Armenian lyrics were written by a famous Armenian songwriter Avet Barseghyan. Here again, Sirusho is representing the mixture of the Armenian traditional rhythms with modern music. The song created a big campaign on Instagram and Facebook by people posting photos with the same black line on the face as in her music video representing sorrow and pain.

== Music video ==
Both the Armenian and English versions of "Where Were You" are presented in one video. The song starts off in a relaxing, voice-over way before Sirusho unleashes her power in the chorus, holding those long, high notes and expressing the pain of the song, which overtly references the Armenian genocide in this, the centenary year of the tragedy. The song seamlessly mixes modern pop with traditional Armenian sounds.

As in her music video for PreGomesh, Sirusho is wearing exquisite Armenian traditional garments in her music video for "Where Were You", thus keeping up her completely news approach to Armenian historical and cultural traditions.

== Song meaning ==
After the music video was released, she posted a Facebook status "My recent works are inspired by the Armenian beats. The folk dance "Yerek Votk of Lori" both with its rhythmical structure and the dance steps, is used as a basis on which we created a completely new song and dance. Throughout our history, even in the most difficult times, we were able to find strength and courage through singing and dancing. This is a characteristic of a strong nation, which i'm very proud of".

"Each language has its own message. The Armenian lyrics are what I feel I want to say to the Armenians. The English lyrics are question or a demand addressed to the "indifferent" world. I want to say Thank You to the great people I worked with on this project."
