= Sebu (disambiguation) =

Sebu may refer to:

- Cebu, a city in the Philippines
- Sebu Simonian, Syrian musician
- Lake Sebu, a lake in the Philippines
