= Tajinder =

Tajinder is a given name of Indian origin.

== People with the surname ==
- Tajinder Singh (born 1992), Indian cricketer
- Tajinder Singh Toor (born 1994), Indian shot putter

== See also ==
- Tariner
