= Syuzan Margaryan =

Armenian singer

Syuzan Margaryan / Սյուզան Մարգարյան
- Born: October 6, 1961 (age 64); Yerevan, Armenian SSR, Soviet Union
- Occupation: Singer
- Years active: 1978–present
- Spouse: Hrachya Harutyunyan
- Children: Sirusho

Syuzan Hamleti Margaryan (Armenian: Սյուզան Համլետի Մարգարյան; born October 6, 1961), is an Armenian singer. In 2003, Margaryan was awarded with the title of Honored Artist of Armenia.
