= In a Tidal Wave of Mystery =

Studio album by Capital Cities
- Released: June 4, 2013
- Recorded: 2010–2013
- Genre: Indie pop; dance-pop; synth-pop; indietronica
- Length: 43:45
- Label: Lazy Hooks; Capitol
- Producer: Ryan Merchant; Sebu Simonian

Capital Cities chronology
Capital Cities (2011)	In a Tidal Wave of Mystery (2013)	Swimming Pool Summer (2017)

Singles from In a Tidal Wave of Mystery
- 1. "Safe and Sound" Released: January 6, 2011; 2. "Kangaroo Court" Released: March 27, 2012; 3. "I Sold My Bed, But Not My Stereo" Released: November 11, 2013; 4. "One Minute More" Released: March 25, 2014

In a Tidal Wave of Mystery is the debut studio album of American indie pop duo Capital Cities, released on June 4, 2013, under Capitol Records. It was preceded by the single "Safe and Sound" in January 2011, which ultimately became their most successful song worldwide. The album features a sole guest appearance from André 3000.

== Background and production ==
Ryan Merchant and Sebu Simonian met on Craigslist and worked as jingle writers for various companies before deciding to form Capital Cities. The pair then wrote "Safe and Sound" and began working on their debut album; the title In a Tidal Wave of Mystery originates from a lyric in the third verse of "Safe and Sound". Merchant and Simonian wrote, composed, produced and mixed the entirety of the album, with the exception of "Lazy Lies", produced by Simon Mills. Outkast member André 3000, vocalist Shemika Secrest and NPR's Frank Tavares are featured on the song "Farrah Fawcett Hair", while vocalist Soseh is featured on "Chasing You".

The Deluxe Edition of this album includes "One Minute More" and three remixes.

== Release ==
The album's cover artwork was designed by Brazilian artist João Lauro Fonte.

In a Tidal Wave of Mystery was released on June 4, 2013, by Capitol Records and was the first Capitol Records album to be distributed by Universal Music Group, following the break-up of Capitol's previous distributor EMI. It was released on compact disc and 180 gram heavyweight black vinyl, limited to 5,000 copies. It debuted at number 66 on the United States Billboard 200 albums chart. A deluxe vinyl version of the album, including the digital album's four bonus tracks, was reissued in 2014 on 2xLP.

== Singles ==
The album's lead single "Safe and Sound" was released digitally on January 6, 2011. Capitol Records serviced the single to United States modern rock radio over a year later on November 27, 2012, and it topped the Billboard Alternative Songs chart. It subsequently became the duo's breakout hit, peaking at number eight on the Billboard Hot 100 and reaching the top ten of numerous mainstream charts internationally.

"Kangaroo Court" was issued as the second single on June 7, 2013 and impacted US modern rock radio on August 6, 2013. "I Sold My Bed, But Not My Stereo" was released digitally in select territories on November 11, 2013, as the third overall single from the album. "One Minute More" was later included on the deluxe edition of In a Tidal Wave of Mystery and released as the album's fourth single on March 25, 2014.

Though not a single, the album's twelfth track, "Love Away", was originally released as the final track of their 2011 self-titled extended-play.

== Critical reception ==
Professional ratings
Review scores
Source	Rating
AllMusic	4/5 stars
Gigwise	7/10
Spin	6/10

Matt Collar of AllMusic wrote a positive review of In a Tidal Wave of Mystery, describing it as an "infectious mix of synth-heavy dance pop" and drawing comparisons to American rock group MGMT and Italian musician Giorgio Moroder. Chloe Ravat of Gigwise wrote that Merchant and Simonian "are damn sure on how to write a good electro pop song." Chuck Arnold of People wrote: "With its buoyant synth-pop sheen, 'Safe and Sound,' the hit single that opens this disc, is bound to be one of the songs of summer. And this new duo keep the hooks coming on tracks like 'I Sold My Bed but Not My Stereo.'"

== Track listing ==
All tracks are written by Ryan Merchant and Sebu Simonian, with “Farrah Fawcett Hair” additionally written by André Benjamin. All tracks are produced by Merchant and Simonian, except for “Lazy Lies”, produced by Simon Mills.

No.	Title	Length
1.	"Safe and Sound"	3:13
2.	"Patience Gets Us Nowhere Fast"	3:08
3.	"Kangaroo Court"	3:43
4.	"I Sold My Bed, But Not My Stereo"	3:55
5.	"Center Stage"	4:02
6.	"Farrah Fawcett Hair" (featuring André 3000)	3:50
7.	"Chartreuse"	3:39
8.	"Origami"	3:45
9.	"Lazy Lies"	2:57
10.	"Tell Me How to Live"	3:24
11.	"Chasing You" (featuring Soseh)	3:50
12.	"Love Away"	3:43
Total length:		43:45

Deluxe edition
No.	Title	Length
13.	"One Minute More"	3:22
14.	"Patience Gets Us Nowhere Fast" (Napoleon Remix)	5:17
15.	"Lazy Lies" (CliffLight Remix)	3:52
16.	"Safe and Sound" (Dzeko & Torres' Digital Dreamin Remix)	5:43
Total length:		65:43

== Personnel ==
Credits for In a Tidal Wave of Mystery adapted from album liner notes.

Capital Cities

- Sebu Simonian – mixing, production, songwriting, vocals
- Ryan Merchant – mixing, production, songwriting, vocals

Additional personnel

- André Benjamin – rapping, songwriting (6)
- Channing Holmes – drums
- Andrew Kzirian – oud
- Spencer Ludwig – trumpet
- Mike Marsh – mastering
- Nick Merwin – guitar
- Simon Mills – production
- Manny Quintero – bass
- Shemika Secrest – vocals
- Soseh – vocals
- Frank Tavares – narration
- Mike Marsh – mastering
- Karen Thompson – mastering
- Brian Warfield – trumpet

== Charts ==
Chart performance for In a Tidal Wave of Mystery
Chart (2013)	Peak position
Austrian Albums (Ö3 Austria)	53
Belgian Albums (Ultratop Flanders)	151
Belgian Albums (Ultratop Wallonia)	156
French Albums (SNEP)	163
German Albums (Offizielle Top 100)	75
UK Albums (Official Charts Company)	187
US Billboard 200	66
US Top Alternative Albums (Billboard)	15
US Top Rock Albums (Billboard)	23

== Certifications ==
Certifications for In a Tidal Wave of Mystery
Region	Certification	Certified units/sales
Mexico (AMPROFON)	Platinum	60,000^{^}
New Zealand (RMNZ)	Gold	7,500^{‡}
United States (RIAA)	Platinum	1,000,000^{‡}
^{^} Shipments figures based on certification alone.^{‡} Sales+streaming figures based on certification alone.
