= Hrachya Harutyunyan =

Armenian actor and artistic director

- Born: February 14, 1961 (age 64); Yerevan, Armenian SSR, Soviet Union
- Education: Yerevan State Institute of Theater and Cinema
- Occupation(s): Actor, Artistic Director
- Years active: 1978–present
- Spouse: Syuzan Margaryan
- Children: Sirusho
- Awards: Honored artist of RA (2006) and State Award of RA (2012)

Hrachya Kamsari Harutyunyan (Armenian: Հրաչյա Կամսարի Հարությունյան; born February 14, 1961) is an Armenian actor and artistic director.

== Biography ==
Hrachya Harutyunyan was born on February 14, 1961, in Yerevan.

Between 1979 and 1981, Harutyunyan studied at variety-circus department adjacent to ''Hayhamerg'' union, received a qualification of an artist in the original genre. In 1984, Harutyunyan graduated from the Yerevan State Institute of Theater and Cinema, faculty of Cinema. Starting from 1978, Harutyunyan worked at Hrachya Ghaplanyan Drama Theatre in Yerevan, as an actor and artistic director.

Hrachya Harutyunyan is married to Syuzan Margaryan, singer and honored artist of Armenia. His daughter is Sirusho, who is also a singer and an honored artist of Armenia.

== Works ==
- “Beatrice”
- “Cylinder”
- “Chao”
- “The Hostess”
- “The Wild Girl 20 years ago”
- “Death in Italian Style”
- “The Last Tango”
- “№ 707”
- “Love Has No Age”

== TV-performances ==
- “Kill The Man”
- “One Month in a Village”
- “In a Lift”
- “Impatient Lovers”
- “Me and She”
- “Yeghegnuhi”
- “The Victorious Woman”
- “The Thorn”
- “The Wooden Person”

== Roles of Hrachya Harutyunyan at Theatre ==
- Sergey “Story in Irkutsk”
- Carl “Jeanne d'Arc” J. Anouilh
- Irresponsible “Bus” S. Stratiyev
- Shade “The Shade” Schwarz
- Marc Antonio “Julius Caesar” Shakespeare
- The man “The Woman and The Man” N. Adalian
- Vince “Chao” M. Movazhon
- Jesus of Nazareth “Jesus of Nazareth and His Second Student” – P. Zeitunian
- Colonel “The Colonel Bird” Kh. Boychev
- Hamlet “Hamlet” Shakespeare
- John “The Voice of Silence or the Sixth Commandment” G. Khanjian, V. Chaldranian
- Philip Debney “Love Mess” H. Berger
- Jack Templeton “The Last Clown” B. Slade
- Judge “Parisian Verdict” P. Zeytunian
- Marvin “№707” N. Simon
- Colomb “Love Has No Age” Jean-Claude Islert

== Films ==
- Ara “White Dreams”
- Abegha “Old Gods”
- Godfather Petros “The Diary of a Cross-theft”
- Rshtuni “Abandoned people”
- Minister “Priestess”
- Arshak “Hostages”
- “Ter Voghormea”
- Father “The Pathway of the Deers”

== Awards ==
- Honored Artist of Armenia (2006)
- State Award of Armenia (2012)
