= PreGomesh =

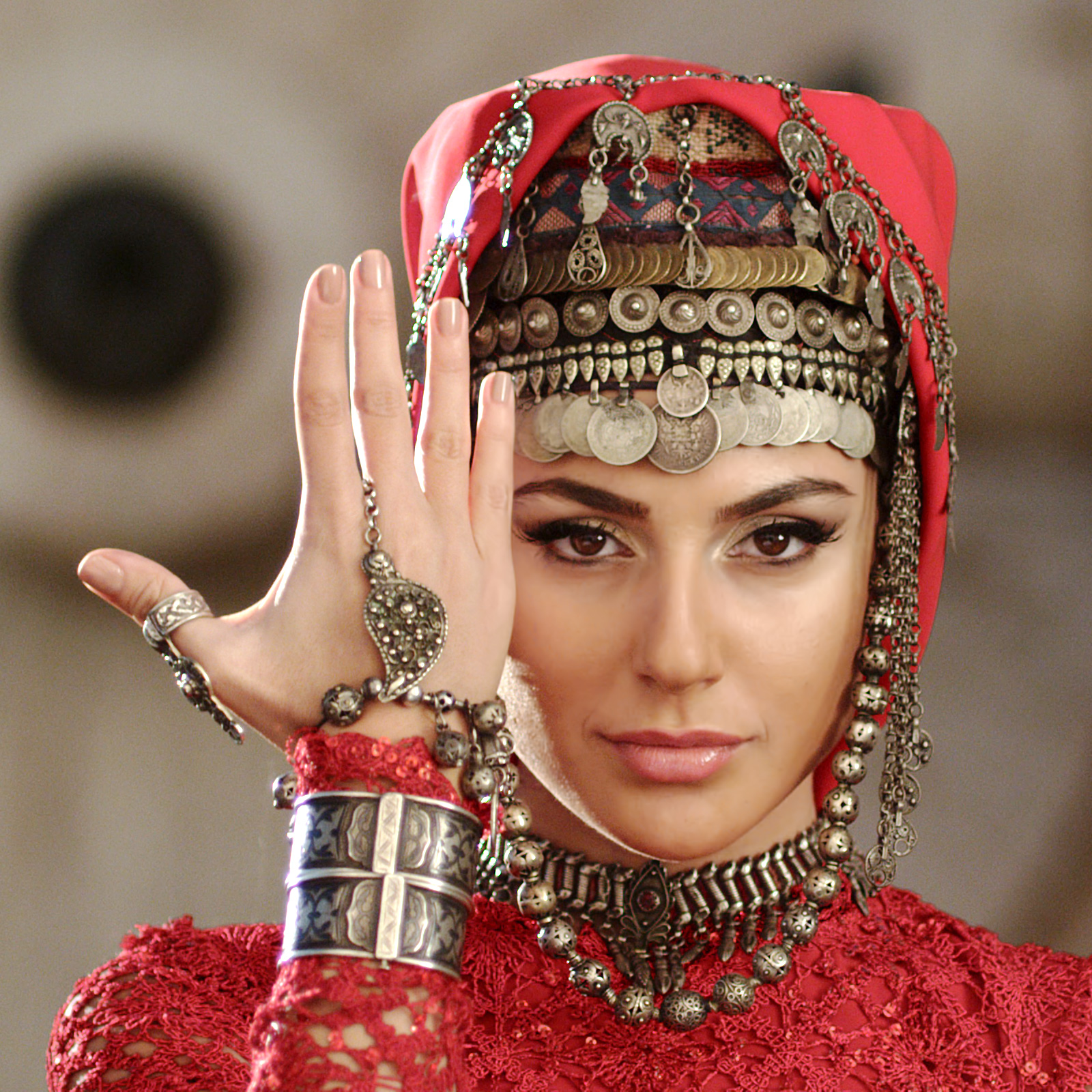

Single by Sirusho
- Released: December 10, 2012
- Recorded: 2012
- Genre: Armenian folk, pop, dance
- Length: 4:09
- Songwriter: Avet Barseghyan Sirusho

Sirusho singles chronology
"I Like It" (2011)	"PreGomesh" (2012)	"See" (2013)

Music video
- "PreGomesh" on YouTube

"PreGomesh" (Armenian: ՊռեԳոմեշ), is a 2012 song by Armenian singer Sirusho. It was released on December 10, 2012, as a single.

== Background ==
Sirusho - "PreGomesh"
One of Sirusho's biggest hits.

On December 9, 2012, Sirusho wrote on her Facebook page that the song was influenced by Lorva gutanerg (Լոռվա գութաներգ) by Komitas and posted a link to it, adding that "it will be first heard on December 10th and is called "PreGomesh". After the music video was released, she posted a status, "Life gives us opportunities of inspiration at every step, it only takes a little to notice them."

== Music video ==
The video, directed by Jor Meloyan, music by Sirusho, was captured in Armenia. The video begins in St. George Church in the village of Mughni. There are also scenes in the open air and in a studio. Armenian folk elements are used in the video, including the modernized version of taraz.

== Song meaning ==
Pregomesh: Gomesh (Armenian: գոմեշ) means Buffalo, and Pre (Armenian: պռե), as well as the Ar-ha and the Pre-re, are the sounds made by herders to guide and move the water buffalo (gomesh). The r in Pre is a heavy, rolling 'r' sound. In Pregomesh the animal represents the human that is strong, honest, and does not give up.

== Criticism ==
Although the song received mostly positive reviews, gusan Haykazun, director of the folk ensemble Haykazunk criticized Sirusho for modifying Komitas's song, saying that "if one wants to be seen, one can simply perform it as it is." Then he continued, "Sirusho didn't have the right to do such a thing." Sirusho responded to this statement by saying that she didn't modify Komitas's song, but was influenced by it.

== Pregomesh Accessories ==
Inspired by the song, Sirusho created Pregomesh Accessories line. Sirusho restored the old Armenian cultural values and aimed at making the world know more about Armenian culture. Sirusho is the founder of the company, involved in designing samples and giving a modern touch to the old ornaments and items.

== Awards ==
Year	Award	Category	City	Result
2013	The Armenian Music Awards	Best Performance – "PreGomesh"	Yerevan	Won
2014	The World Music Awards	World's Best Song – "PreGomesh"	Monte Carlo	Nominated
2014	The World Music Awards	World's Best Music Video – "PreGomesh"	Monte Carlo	Nominated
