= Tariner =

Single by Sirusho and Harout Pamboukjian
- Released: November 4, 2014
- Genre: Traditional folk, rock
- Length: 5:42
- Label: Sirushoo Production
- Songwriter(s): Harout Pambukjian
- Producer(s): Sirusho

"Tariner" (Տարիներ "years") is a classic Armenian song by Harout Pamboukjian.

== Cover version ==
The 2014 song by Sirusho is the remake version of Armenian singer Sirusho released it in November 2014. The original song was released by Harout Pambukjian in the 70's. Produced by Sirusho, both the song and the music video have a modern feel to them and the song features Harout Pambukjian himself. The music video was shot in Los Angeles.
