= One Minute More =

Single by Capital Cities

from the album In a Tidal Wave of Mystery
- Released: April 14, 2011; March 25, 2014
- Length: 3:22
- Label: Lazy Hooks; Capitol
- Songwriters: Ryan Merchant; Sebu Simonian
- Producers: Ryan Merchant; Sebu Simonian

Capital Cities singles chronology
"I Sold My Bed, But Not My Stereo" (2013)	"One Minute More" (2011)	"Vowels" (2016)

"One Minute More" is a song by American indie pop duo Capital Cities, written and produced by band members Ryan Merchant and Sebu Simonian. It was first released as a stand-alone digital single on April 14, 2011, and was later included on the deluxe edition of their debut studio album In a Tidal Wave of Mystery (2013). The song impacted modern rock radio in the United States on March 25, 2014, serving as the fourth single from the album. The song appeared in 2013 film Iron Man 3 and the 2014 film The Giver.

== Music video ==
The official music video for "One Minute More" was directed by Brewer and released on June 19, 2014. The video's primary theme is "the idea of balancing joy and sorrow", and depicts the band performing the song amongst a party of jet skiers, intertwined with scenes of a woman tearfully dealing with a divorce.

== Charts ==
=== Weekly charts ===
Chart (2014)	Peak position
CIS Airplay (TopHit)	41
Russia Airplay (TopHit)	37
US Hot Rock & Alternative Songs (Billboard)	29
US Adult Pop Airplay (Billboard)	29
US Alternative Airplay (Billboard)	23
US Rock & Alternative Airplay (Billboard)	43

=== Year-end charts ===
Chart (2014)	Position
Russia Airplay (TopHit)	141

== Release history ==
Region	Date	Format	Label
United States	April 14, 2011	Digital download	Lazy Hooks
United States	March 25, 2014	Modern rock radio	Capitol Records
United States	June 9, 2014	Hot adult contemporary radio	Capitol Records
United States	June 10, 2014	Contemporary hit radio	Capitol Records
Italy	June 27, 2014	Contemporary hit radio	Hollywood Records
