= Capital Cities (duo) =

American pop duo

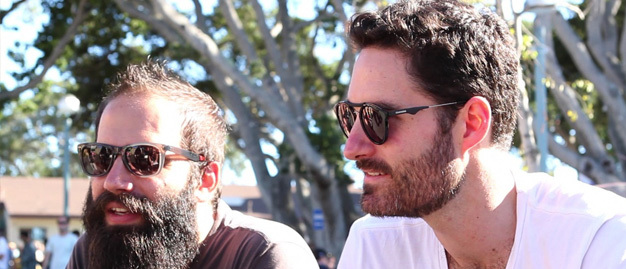
- Capital Cities in 2013; Left to right: Sebu Simonian, Ryan Merchant

Background information
- Origin: Los Angeles, California, US
- Genres: Indie pop; dance-pop; synth-pop; indietronica
- Years active: 2008–present
- Labels: Lazy Hooks; Capitol
- Members: Ryan Merchant; Sebu Simonian
- Website: capitalcities.com

Capital Cities is an American pop duo formed in Los Angeles, California, in 2008 by Ryan Merchant (vocals, keyboard, guitar) and Sebu Simonian (vocals, keyboard). Their debut EP was released on June 7, 2011, with lead single "Safe and Sound" which became their only top ten hit single.

A subsequent single, "Kangaroo Court", was released on March 27, 2012. The band was featured on the Pop Up #1 compilation selected by Perez Hilton that was released on August 7, 2012. The band's song "Safe and Sound" charted at #1 on the US Alternative Songs chart. The song was also used in a German Vodafone commercial, in a television commercial in the United States and Canada for the 2014 Mazda 3, in the film One Small Hitch and in an Air New Zealand in-flight safety video. The song "Center Stage" was featured on ESPN's First Take where they played a short segment of the retro-sounding track before going to commercial breaks.

The band's debut album, In a Tidal Wave of Mystery, was released June 4, 2013 via Capitol Records in partnership with Lazy Hooks. It was the first release of new material on Capitol with a Universal Music Group catalog number. The album debuted at number 66 on the Billboard 200 chart.

== History ==
The two musicians met after Merchant responded to Simonian's open ad on Craigslist offering his production services. They began jingle-writing together. After three years successfully composing music for commercials and advertising campaigns, the duo formed Capital Cities. The band released its debut, self-titled EP in June 2011 via their label, Lazy Hooks.

In 2012, the band signed with Capitol Records. In partnership with Lazy Hooks, the label released In a Tidal Wave of Mystery, the band's debut album, on June 4, 2013. The album takes its name from the lyrics of its top 10 Modern Rock radio hit "Safe and Sound", the album's first single. The song has been used in promotional campaigns for HBO, Smart Car, Microsoft, Mazda and many other spots. The album includes the songs "Kangaroo Court" and "I Sold My Bed, But Not My Stereo". Outkast's André 3000, vocalist Shemika Secrest and NPR's Frank Tavares are featured on the song "Farrah Fawcett Hair". The album is produced and mixed entirely by the pair of Merchant and Simonian. The artwork is by Brazilian artist João Lauro Fonte.

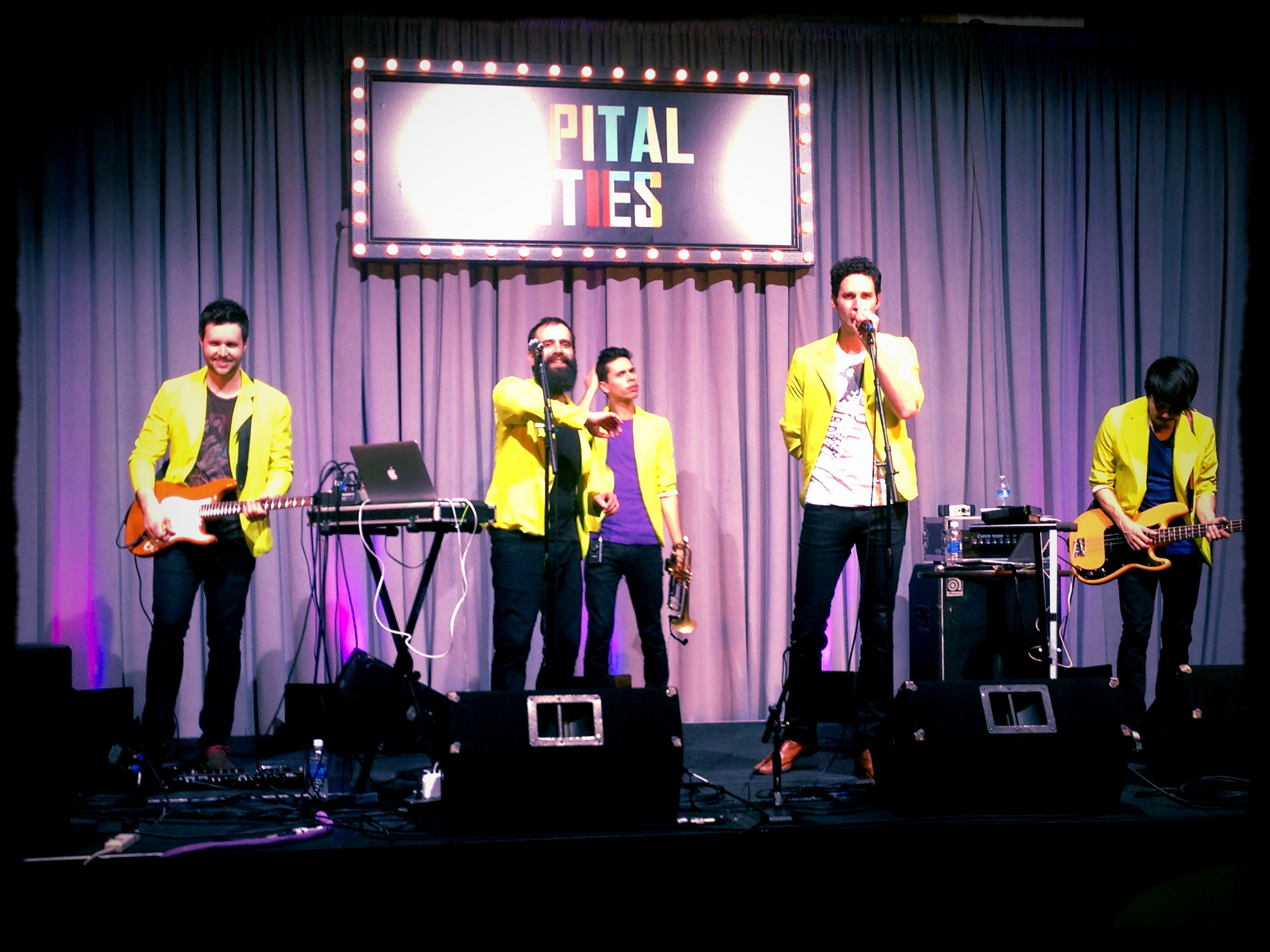
Capital Cities performing in Sunnyvale, California on January 25, 2013

The band embarked on its first-ever North American outing, the "Dancing with Strangers" tour, with special guests Gold Fields, which kicked off on April 23, 2013, at the Crescent Ballroom in Phoenix, Arizona. Capital Cities' May 9 show at New York City's Irving Plaza sold out two months in advance as well two nights at the El Rey Theatre in Los Angeles. All proceeds from the June 7 show at the El Rey went to MusiCares and a Place Called Home. The band has also appeared and performed at Sundance, SXSW, SweetLife, and ULTRA.

The band premiered the official video of "Safe and Sound" on April 25, 2013 on Vevo. The clip was directed by Grady Hall (who also has worked with Beck and Modest Mouse). In the video, the song fuels a mash-up of the past 100 years of dance, presided over by the band at the newly restored Los Angeles Theater in downtown Los Angeles. The video featured work from Emmy-nominated choreographer Mandy Moore. The video was nominated for two 2013 MTV Video Music Awards: Best Art Direction and Best Visual Effects. The video won a 2013 MTV Video Music Award for Best Visual Effects.

In May 2013, "Safe and Sound" reached number one on the German Singles Chart.

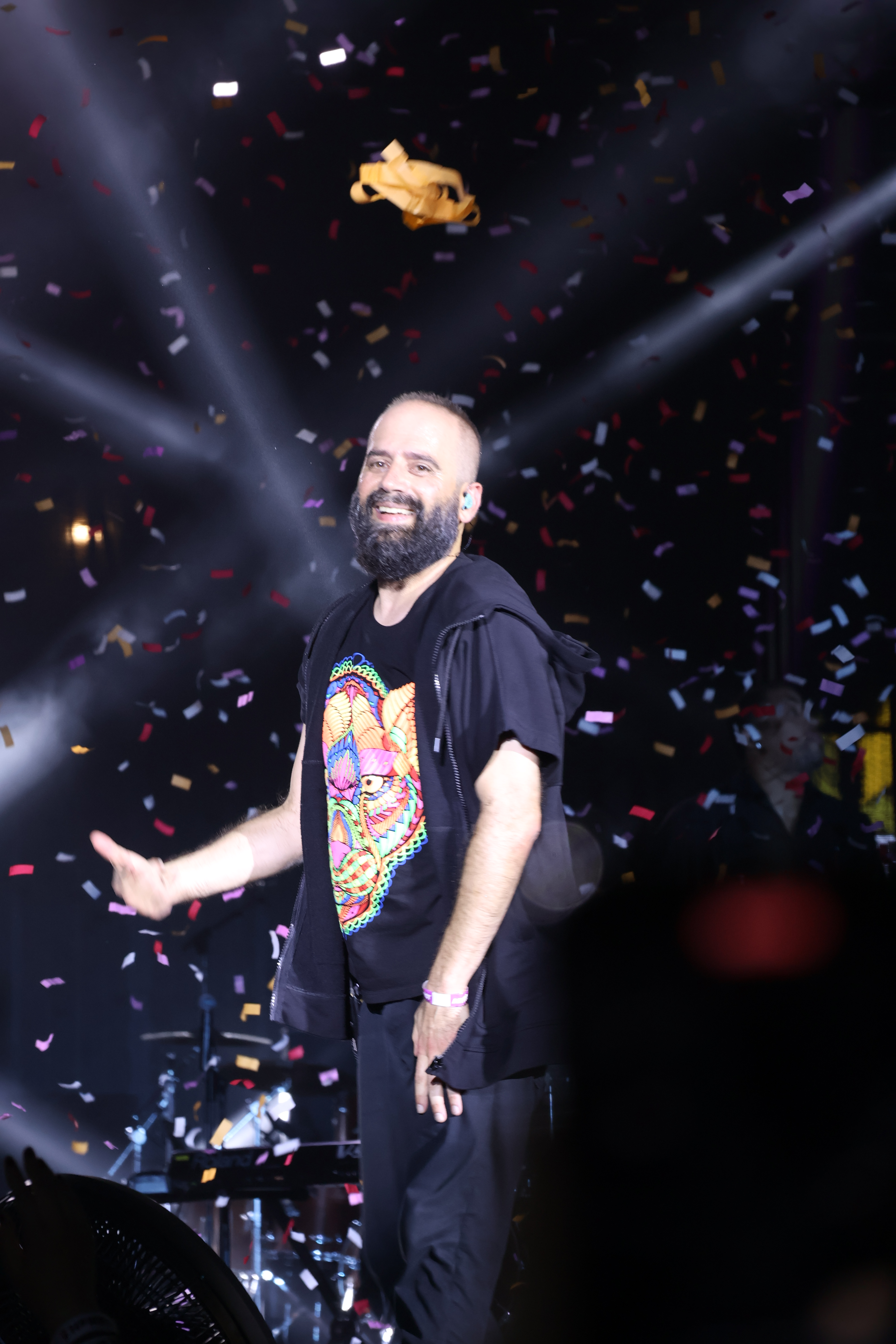
Sebu Simonian performing at The Exchange TRX New Year's Eve Countdown Party on December 31st, 2021.

September 5, 2013 marked the premiere of the "Kangaroo Court" music video. The video features appearances from Darren Criss, Shannon Woodward, and Channing Holmes. The story tells of a zebra (Merchant) who has been forbidden from a club, The Kangaroo Court. Attempting entry disguised as a horse, he falls for a lapdog (Woodward). Her date that night, a bulldog (Criss), becomes jealous and reveals the zebra for who he actually is. The zebra is placed under arrest for his crime and sent to court to face a kangaroo judge (Holmes). He is found guilty immediately and is executed by a lion (Simonian).

The band was nominated for a Grammy Award for Best Music Video.

Capital Cities joined Katy Perry on the North American leg of her Prismatic World Tour.

In April and May 2016, nearly three years after the release of the band's debut album, the official Capital Cities Facebook page made two posts strongly suggesting that new music was in the works. Two years later, the band released four singles within the span of four weeks and followed up with the release of Solarize on August 10, 2018 as their latest album to date.

In October 2023, they released the single "Skeleton Man".

In December 2024, they performed at The Exchange TRX New Year's Eve Countdown Party as the headline performers alongside Henry Lau.

On New Year’s Day 2026 in the Rose Parade, Capital Cities performed their hit song ‘Safe and Sound’ as the closer for the parade.

== Discography ==
=== Studio albums ===
Title	Album details	Peak chart positions									Certifications
Title	Album details	US	US Rock	AUT	BEL (FL)	BEL (WA)	FRA	GER	ITA	UK	Certifications
In a Tidal Wave of Mystery	Released: June 4, 2013; Label: Lazy Hooks, Capitol; Formats: CD, LP, digital download	66	23	53	151	156	163	75	99	187	RIAA: Platinum
Solarize	Released: August 10, 2018; Label: Lazy Hooks, Capitol; Formats: CD, LP, digital download	—	—	—	—	—	—	—	—	—	
"—" denotes a recording that did not chart or was not released in that territory.

=== Extended plays ===
Title	EP details
Safe and Sound Remix EP	Released: February 1, 2011; Label: Lazy Hooks; Formats: Digital download
Capital Cities EP	Released: December 18, 2012; Label: Lazy Hooks; Formats: CD, 12"
Kangaroo Court EP	Released: December 17, 2013; Label: Lazy Hooks; Formats: Digital download
Swimming Pool Summer EP	Released: July 7, 2017; Label: Lazy Hooks; Formats: Digital download
Safe And Sound 11th Anniversary Bundle	Released: April 1, 2022; Label: Lazy Hooks; Formats: Digital download

=== Singles ===
List of singles, with selected chart positions, showing year released and album name
Title	Year	Peak chart positions										Certifications	Album
Title	Year	US	US Rock	AUT	CAN	CZ	GER	ITA	MEX	SWI	UK	Certifications	Album
"Beginnings"	2010	—	—	—	—	—	—	—	—	—	—		Non-album single
"Safe and Sound"	2011	8	2	2	5	6	1	4	2	8	42	RIAA: 6× Platinum; AMPROFON: 2× Platinum; ARIA: Platinum; BPI: Platinum; BVMI: 5× Gold; FIMI: 2× Platinum; IFPI AUT: Gold; IFPI SWI: Gold; MC: 5× Platinum	In a Tidal Wave of Mystery
"Kangaroo Court"	2012	— (Note: "Kangaroo Court" did not enter the Billboard Hot 100, but peaked at number 14 on the Hot Singles Sales chart.)	50	—	—	—	81	—	41	—	—		In a Tidal Wave of Mystery
"I Sold My Bed, But Not My Stereo"	2013	—	—	—	—	—	—	—	—	—	—		In a Tidal Wave of Mystery
"One Minute More"	2014	— (Note: "One Minute More" did not enter the Billboard Hot 100, but peaked at number 57 on the US Airplay Top 100 chart.)	29	—	—	89	—	—	—	—	—		In a Tidal Wave of Mystery
"Vowels"	2016	—	— (Note: "Vowels" did not chart on the Hot Rock Songs chart but did peak at number 48 on the Rock Airplay chart.)	—	—	—	—	—	—	—	—		Solarize
"My Name Is Mars"	2018	—	—	—	—	—	—	—	—	—	—		Solarize
"Venus & River"	2018	—	—	—	—	—	—	—	—	—	—		Solarize
"Levitate"	2018	—	—	—	—	—	—	—	—	—	—		Solarize
"Just Say When"	2018	—	—	—	—	—	—	—	—	—	—		Solarize
"Space"	2018	—	—	—	—	—	—	—	—	—	—		Solarize
"Skeleton Man"	2023	—	—	—	—	—	—	—	—	—	—		Non-album single
"Nothing Compares 2 U"	2024												Non-album single
"—" denotes a recording that did not chart or was not released in that territory.

== Awards and nominations ==
Year	Awards	Category	Work	Result
2013	MTV Video Music Awards	Best Visual Effects	"Safe and Sound"	Won
2013	MTV Video Music Awards	Best Art Direction	"Safe and Sound"	Nominated
2014	Grammy Awards	Best Music Video	"Safe and Sound"	Nominated
2014	Billboard Music Awards	Top Rock Song	"Safe and Sound"	Nominated
2014	Billboard Music Awards	Top Rock Artist	Capital Cities	Nominated
2014	Billboard Music Awards	Top New Artist	Capital Cities	Nominated
