= Sebu Simonian =

Armenian-American musician

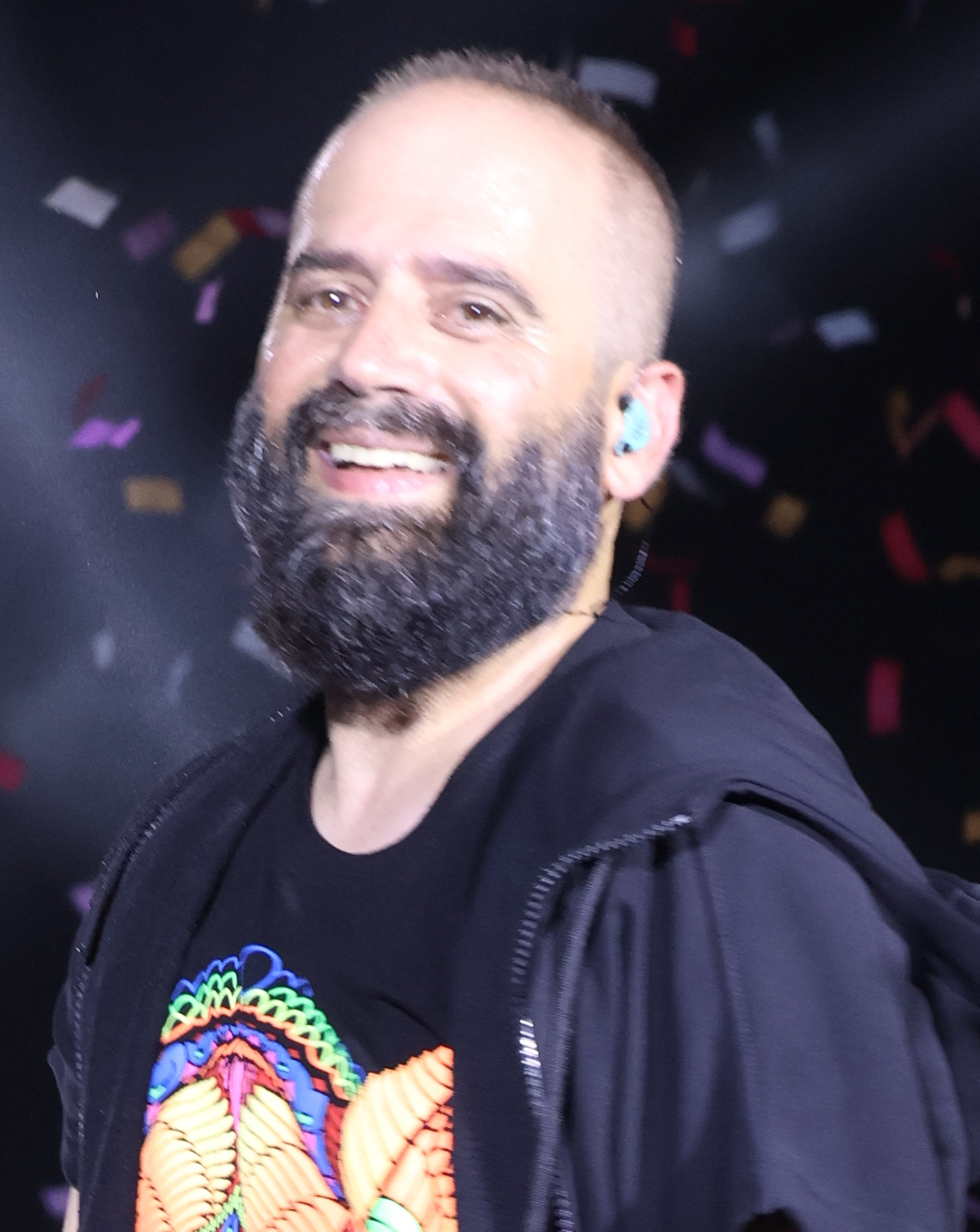
- Simonian in 2024

Background information
- Born: Sebu Simonian; October 15, 1978 (age 47); Aleppo, Syria
- Origin: Los Angeles, U.S.
- Occupations: Musician; singer; songwriter; record producer
- Instruments: Keyboards; vocals
- Member of: Capital Cities

Sebu Simonian (born October 15, 1978; Armenian: Սեպուհ Սիմոնեան) is an Armenian-American keyboardist, singer, and songwriter, one-half of the Los Angeles-based indie pop duo Capital Cities.

== Early life ==
Simonian was born in 1978 in Aleppo, Syria, to Armenian parents from Lebanon, whose ancestors were survivors of the Armenian genocide. His paternal grandfather was from the region of Cilicia (in present-day Turkey's Çukurova region). Simonian's parents were from Beirut, Lebanon, but "because of a civil war [his] mum had to flee and [he] happened to be born in Syria." Soon after his birth his family returned to Lebanon where they stayed until 1985 and moved to the United States due to the civil war there.

Simonian grew up in Los Angeles County. His family is involved in the Armenian community, while Simonian himself was an editorial assistant at the English Section of the Armenian daily Asbarez in the late 1990s. He graduated from Glendale High School. He is an alumnus of the California State University, Northridge, where he studied music.

== Career ==
Simonian started his first band when he was 15. In 2004, Simonian (as lead singer and keyboardist) and Ryan Welker, guitarist and backing vocals, formed the rock band Aviatic.

Simonian met Ryan Merchant in 2008 through Craigslist while searching for a job as a music producer. Initially, they worked as jingle writers and wrote songs for other bands. They formed the indie pop duo Capital Cities in 2010. Simonian was featured on Brian Wilson's 2015 album No Pier Pressure, performing and producing the track "Runaway Dancer". In 2017, Simonian was featured on Armenian singer Sirusho's single "Vuy Aman".

== Personal life ==
Simonian is married and has two sons.

Simonian wears a long beard, which has gained significant media attention. Rolling Stone magazine named his beard the best at the 2014 Coachella Valley Music and Arts Festival and described it as "luxuriant [and] Rasputin-like" and rabbi-like. When asked why he doesn't shave, he responded "I'm just lazy" and added that he sees himself as "a little bit of" a hipster.

== Filmography ==
As himself
Year	Title	Notes
2017	Nice Evening (Լավ Երեկո)	Special guest
