= Sarkis Minassian =

Armenian journalist, writer, political activist, educator

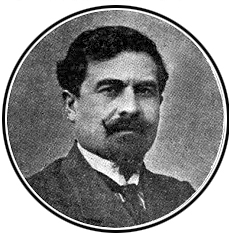
- Born: 1873; Yalova, Ottoman Empire
- Died: 1915 (aged 41–42); Karaçur, Ottoman Empire
- Occupations: Armenian journalist, writer, political activist, and educator

Sarkis Minassian (1873–1915), also known as Aram Ashod, was an Armenian journalist, writer, political activist, and educator. He became the chief editor of the newspaper Hairenik in Watertown, Massachusetts. After returning to the Ottoman Empire in 1909, Minassian continued writing in various journals in the city. In 1915, Sarkis Minassian was killed during the Armenian genocide.

== Life ==
"Reality versus idealism; without these twin concepts, a nation will be subjugated to downfalls and bitter disappointments. With one, we attain the feeling of life, with the other, we fixate our eyes towards the distant stars."

— Sarkis Minassian (original in Armenian)

Sarkis Minassian was born in 1873 in the village of Çengiler, near Yalova in northwestern Anatolia. He attained his early education in Bardizag (today Bahçecik, Kocaeli). Thereafter, Minassian moved to Constantinople to continue his education at the Getronagan Armenian High School. After graduating from Getronagan in 1894, Minassian moved to Geneva, Switzerland where he became a staff member of the Armenian newspaper Droshak, the official organ of the Armenian Revolutionary Federation. In 1903, Minassian moved to the United States where he became the managing editor of the Armenian newspaper Hairenik. In 1905, he moved back to Geneva where he remained until 1909 when, after the Young Turk Revolution, he moved back to Constantinople. While in Constantinople, Minassian briefly worked as a teacher and continued writing. He was then elected as a deputy of the Armenian National Assembly representing the Kasımpaşa district. Minassian was a frequent contributor to the newspaper Azadamard where his criticisms of various aspects of the Armenian community were widely read. He was known for his lectures concerning the Armenian language in various Armenian schools throughout Constantinople.

Fluent in French, Minassian planned to write a French-Armenian dictionary. The dictionary was to introduce new words from both languages and was to provide dialectic terminology. However, due to his early death, the dictionary was never published and was left in the possession of his mother who was living in Geneva at the time.

Minassian did, however, publish an extensive biography on the life of Armenian revolutionary Serob Aghpur.

== Death ==
Sarkis Minassian was one of the Armenian leaders deported during the Armenian genocide. On the night of 24 April 1915, Minassian was arrested and sent via train to Ayaş, a village located in the interior provinces of the Ottoman Empire. Confined in a prison at Ayaş, Minassian along with Rupen Zartarian, Karekin Khajag, Khachatur Malumian, Harutiun Jangülian, and Nazaret Daghavarian were transferred to Diyarbakir on 2 June. They were ostensibly to undergo a court-martial in Diyarbakir. However, Minassian along with the rest were murdered en route in the locality of Karacur between Urfa and Severek (today Siverek). The order for the murder was given from Captain Şevket to Haci Onbaşı, a member of the Special Organization.

== Bibliography ==
- Balakian, Grigoris (2010). Peter Balakian and Aris Sevag (ed.). Armenian Golgotha: a memoir of the Armenian genocide, 1915-1918 (1st Vintage Books ed.). New York: Vintage Books. ISBN 978-1400096770.
- Kevorkian, Raymond H. (2010). The Armenian genocide: a complete history (Reprinted. ed.). London: I. B. Tauris. ISBN 978-1-84885-561-8.
- Odian, Yervant (2009). Krikor Beledian (ed.). Accursed years: my exile and return from Der Zor, 1914-1919. London: Gomidas Institute. ISBN 978-1903656846.
