= Garegin Khazhak =

Armenian journalist, writer, political activist and educator

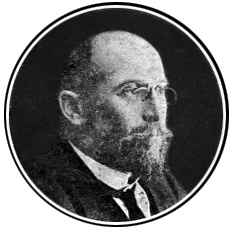
- Born: 6 October 1867; Alexandropol, Russian Empire
- Died: 1915 (aged 47–48); Diyarbakir, Ottoman Empire
- Occupations: Armenian journalist, writer, political activist, and educator

Garegin Khazhak (also Karekin Khajag, Armenian: Գարեգին Խաժակ; 6 October 1867 – 1915) was an Armenian journalist, writer, political activist and educator. A member of the Armenian Revolutionary Federation, Khajag traveled around the world to help support revolutionary activity. During his life, Khazhak was imprisoned four times. He became a professor and a principal in several Armenian schools throughout the region. In 1915, Khazhak was arrested and subsequently killed during the Armenian genocide.

== Life ==
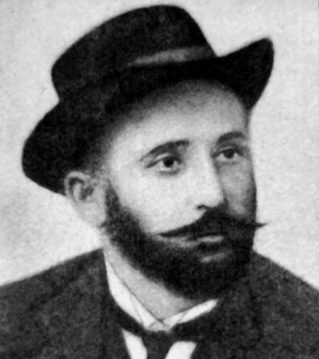
Garegin Khazhak in his youth

Garegin Khazhak was born Garegin Chagalian on 6 October 1867 in Aleksandropol within the Russian Empire (present-day Gyumri, Armenia). He was called Chakal Oghli (Turkish: son of Chakal), which would later be rendered as Khazhak by those around him. In 1883, after attaining his early education locally, he continued his higher education at the Gevorgian Seminary. Graduating in 1886, Khazhak became a teacher and for seven years taught in parochial schools in Baku, Akulis, and Ganja. During his time in Baku, Khazhak joined the Armenian Revolutionary Federation (ARF). To further his education, Khajag went to Geneva, where he attended the University of Geneva and studied social sciences. While in Geneva, he began to contribute to the newspaper Droshak, an organ of the ARF.

Immediately after his graduation in 1898, Khazhak was sent to the Balkans and then Alexandria by the editorial staff of Droshak. After staying in Alexandria for a year, he went to İzmir for six months and finally Constantinople, where he remained for two years.

My Dear,
They're sending me far, so far away from you, toward Tigranakert [i.e., Diyarbekir. With me, are the following prisoners of Ayaş: Aknuni, Sarkis Minasian, Dr. Daghavarian, Jihangul.
At the Ereyli train-station, I met an Armenian who promised me to deliver this letter to you. Look after yourself and my girls Nunis and Alos well.
We don't know why they brought us here, but I have great hope that we will see each other once again.
So, goodbye, I'm kissing you and my sweet girls.
Yours,
G. Khazhak

— Karekin Khajag's last letter to his wife and family (original in Armenian)

Khazhak was imprisoned for eight months due to revolutionary activity. He was then exiled to the Caucasus where he continued his work as a teacher. He became the principal of the Armenian school in Shushi for two years. After his marriage, Khajag settled in Tiflis in 1903 and became one of the editors of the Armenian newspaper Mshak. While working for the newspaper, he also taught on the side at the Nersisyan School. In 1906, he became one of the founding editors of the newspaper Harach, working alongside Avetis Aharonian and Yeghisheh Topjian.

In 1908 he was arrested and sent to prison, where he remained for six months. After being released, Khazhak was arrested again and sent to prison nine months later.

After being released from prison in 1912, Khajag returned to Constantinople where he contributed to the local newspaper Azadamard, while becoming a principal of an Armenian school in the district of Samatya.

== Death ==
Khazhak was one of the Armenian leaders deported during the Armenian Genocide. On the night of 24 April 1915, Khajag was arrested and imprisoned in Constantinople, then sent via train to Ayaş, a village located in the interior provinces of the Ottoman Empire. Confined in a prison at Ayaş, Khajag along with Rupen Zartarian, Sarkis Minassian, Khachatur Malumian, Harutiun Jangülian, and Nazaret Daghavarian were to be transferred to Diyarbakir on 2 June. Ostensibly, they were to undergo a court-martial in Diyarbakir; however, Khajag along with the rest were murdered en route in the area of Karacur between Urfa and Severek (today Siverek). The order for the murder was given from Captain Şevket to Haci Onbaşı, a member of the Special Organization.

== Bibliography ==
- Balakian, Grigoris (2010). Peter Balakian and Aris Sevag (ed.). Armenian Golgotha: a memoir of the Armenian genocide, 1915-1918 (1st Vintage Books ed.). New York: Vintage Books. ISBN 978-1400096770.
- Kevorkian, Raymond H. (2010). The Armenian genocide: a complete history (Reprinted. ed.). London: I. B. Tauris. ISBN 978-1-84885-561-8.
- Tasnapetian, Hrach (1990). History of the Armenian Revolutionary Federation. Oemme Edizioni. ISBN 9788885822115.
