= List of Armenians from Istanbul =

This is a list of Armenians from Istanbul.

== Ottoman era ==
- Abro Chelebi, merchant
- Aram Andonian, journalist
- Arpiar Arpiarian, writer
- Balyan family, dynasty of architects
- Hagop Baronian, writer, satirist
- Nazaret Daghavarian, doctor
- Garabet Artin Davoudian, career diplomat and the first mutasarrif of Mount Lebanon
- Eremia Chelebi, writer and traveler
- Erukhan, writer
- Calouste Gulbenkian, businessman and philanthropist
- Hagop Kazazian Pasha, minister of Finance
- Mkrtich Khrimian, religious leader, writer
- Komitas Vardapet, musician
- Yervant Odian, writer, satirist
- Ruben Sevak, writer
- Levon Shant, playwright, writer
- Siamanto, writer
- Papken Siuni, political activist
- Bedros Tourian, poet
- Daniel Varujan, poet
- Rupen Zartarian, writer, educator
- Krikor Zohrab, statesman, author

== Republican era ==
- Arman Manukyan, professor, writer, economist
- Şahan Arzruni, concert pianist
- Agop Dilâçar, linguist and specialist in Turkic languages
- Ara Güler, photographer
- Sevan Nişanyan, writer and lexicographer
- Daron Acemoglu, economist
