= Deportation of Armenian intellectuals on 24 April 1915 =

Start of Armenian genocide

Deportation of Armenian intellectuals
- Part of the Armenian genocide
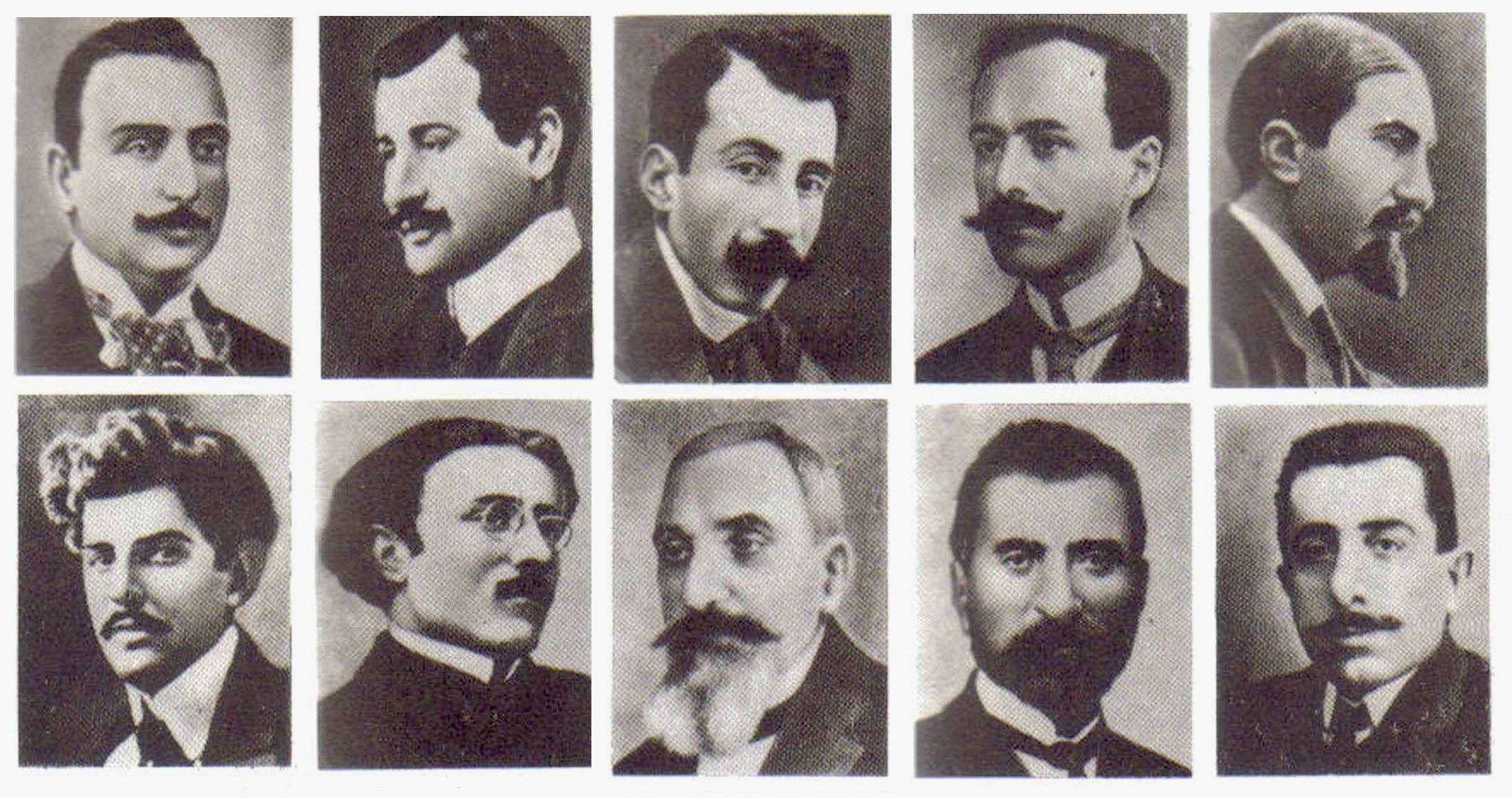
- Some of the Armenian intellectuals who were detained, deported, and killed in 1915: 1st row: Krikor Zohrab, Daniel Varoujan, Rupen Zartarian, Ardashes Harutiunian, Siamanto; 2nd row: Ruben Sevak, Dikran Chökürian, Diran Kelekian, Tlgadintsi, and Erukhan
- Location: Ottoman Empire
- Date: 24 April 1915 (start date)
- Target: Notables of the Armenian community of Constantinople
- Attack type: Deportation and eventual murder
- Perpetrator: Committee of Union and Progress (Young Turks)

The deportation of Armenian intellectuals on 24 April 1915 is considered the beginning of the Armenian genocide. Leaders of the Armenian community in the Ottoman capital of Constantinople (now Istanbul) were arrested and moved to holding centers near Angora (now Ankara). The order to do so was given by Minister of the Interior Talaat Pasha on 24 April 1915. On that night, 235 to 270 Armenian intellectuals of Constantinople were arrested. With the adoption of the Tehcir Law, these detainees were relocated within the Ottoman Empire; many of them were tortured and publicly executed. More than 80 survived, notably including Vrtanes Papazian, Aram Andonian, and Komitas.

The event has been described by historians as a decapitation strike, intended to deprive the Armenian population of leadership and organized resistance. More deportations followed in the coming months, eventually comprising an estimated 2,345 deportees.

Since 1919, 24 April has been observed as Armenian Genocide Remembrance Day. This anniversary is a national memorial day in Armenia (previously also in the Republic of Artsakh) and is observed by the Armenian diaspora around the world.

== Deportation ==
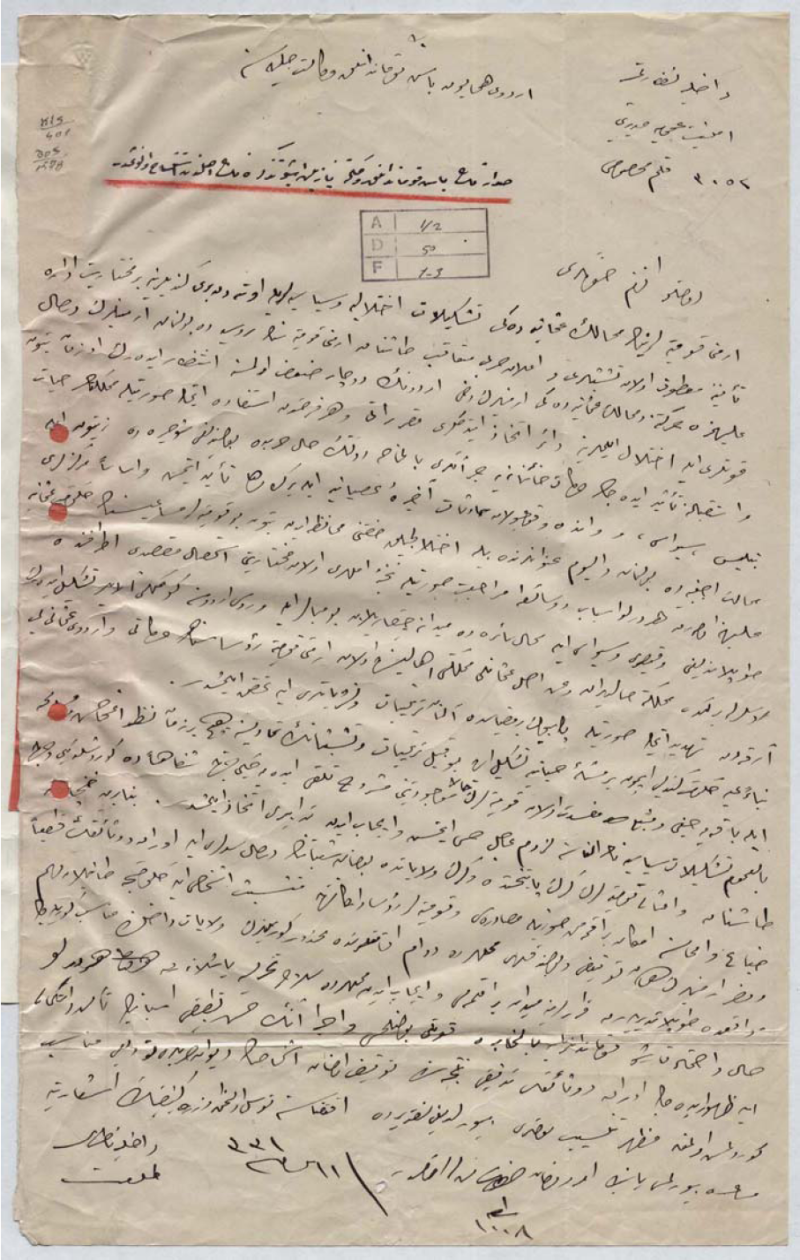
Original copy of the Instruction of the Ministry of the Interior on 24 April 1915

=== Detention ===
Ottoman Minister of the Interior Talaat Pasha ordered the detention of more than 200 Armenian intellectuals on 24 April 1915. The operation commenced at 8 p.m. In Constantinople, the action was led by Chief of Police Bedri Bey. Among the 235 to 270 deported were Armenian leaders, clergymen, physicians, editors, journalists, lawyers, teachers, politicians, and others. Discrepancies in numbers may be explained by the uncertainties of the police as they imprisoned people with similar names.

There were further deportations from the capital. The first task was to identify those imprisoned; they were held for one day in a police station (Ottoman Turkish: Emniyeti Umumiye) and the Central Prison. A second wave of deportations brought the total to between 500 and 600 deportees.

By the end of August 1915, about 150 Armenians with Russian citizenship were deported from Constantinople to holding centers. A few of the detained, including writer Alexander Panossian (1859–1919), were released the same weekend before even being transferred to Anatolia. In total, it is estimated that 2,345 Armenian notables were detained and eventually deported, most of whom were not nationalists and did not have any political affiliations.

=== Holding centers ===
Key locations

After the passage of Tehcir Law on 29 May 1915, Armenians left at the two holding centers were deported to Ottoman Syria. Most of the arrested were transferred from Central Prison over Saray Burnu by steamer No. 67 of the Şirket company to the Haydarpaşa train station. After waiting for ten hours, they were sent by special train in the direction of Angora (Ankara) the next day. The entire convoy consisted of 220 Armenians. An Armenian train conductor got a list of names of the deportees. It was handed over to the Armenian Patriarch of Constantinople, Zaven Der Yeghiayan, who immediately tried in vain to save as many deportees as possible. The only foreign ambassador to help him in his efforts was US ambassador Henry Morgenthau. After a train journey of 20 hours, the deportees got off in Sincanköy (near Angora) Tuesday noon. At the station Ibrahim, the director of the Central Prison of Constantinople, did the triage. The deportees were divided into two groups.

One group was sent to Çankırı (and Çorum between Çankırı and Amasya) and the other to Ayaş. Those separated for Ayaş were transported in carts for a couple of hours further to Ayaş. Almost all of them were killed several months later in gorges near Angora. Only 10 (or 13) deportees of this group were granted permission to return to Constantinople from Ayaş. (Note: According to Teotig's year book 1916–20 these were: Dikran Ajemian, Mkrtich Garabedian, H. Asadurian, Haig Tiriakian, Shavarsh Panossian, Krikor Siurmeian, Servet, Dr. Parseghian, Piuzant Bozajian, and Dr. Avedis Nakashian.) A group of 20 latecomers arrested on 24 April arrived in Çankırı around 7 or 8 May 1915. Roughly 150 political prisoners were detained in Ayaş, and another 150 intellectual prisoners were detained in Çankırı.

=== Court martial ===
Some notables such as Dr. Nazaret Daghavarian and Sarkis Minassian were removed on 5 May from the Ayaş prison and taken under military escort to Diyarbekir along with Harutiun Jangülian, Karekin Khajag, and Rupen Zartarian to appear before a court martial. They were, seemingly, murdered by state-sponsored paramilitary groups led by Cherkes Ahmet, and lieutenants Halil and Nazım, at a locality called Karacaören shortly before arriving at Diyarbekir. Marzbed, another deportee, was dispatched to Kayseri to appear before a court martial on 18 May 1915.

The militants responsible for the murders were tried and executed in Damascus by Djemal Pasha in September 1915; the incident later became the subject of a 1916 investigation by the Ottoman Parliament led by Artin Boshgezenian, the deputy for Aleppo. After Marzbed's release from the court, he worked under a false Ottoman identity for the Germans in Intilli (Amanus railway tunnel). He escaped to Nusaybin, where he fell from a horse and died shortly before the armistice.

=== Release ===
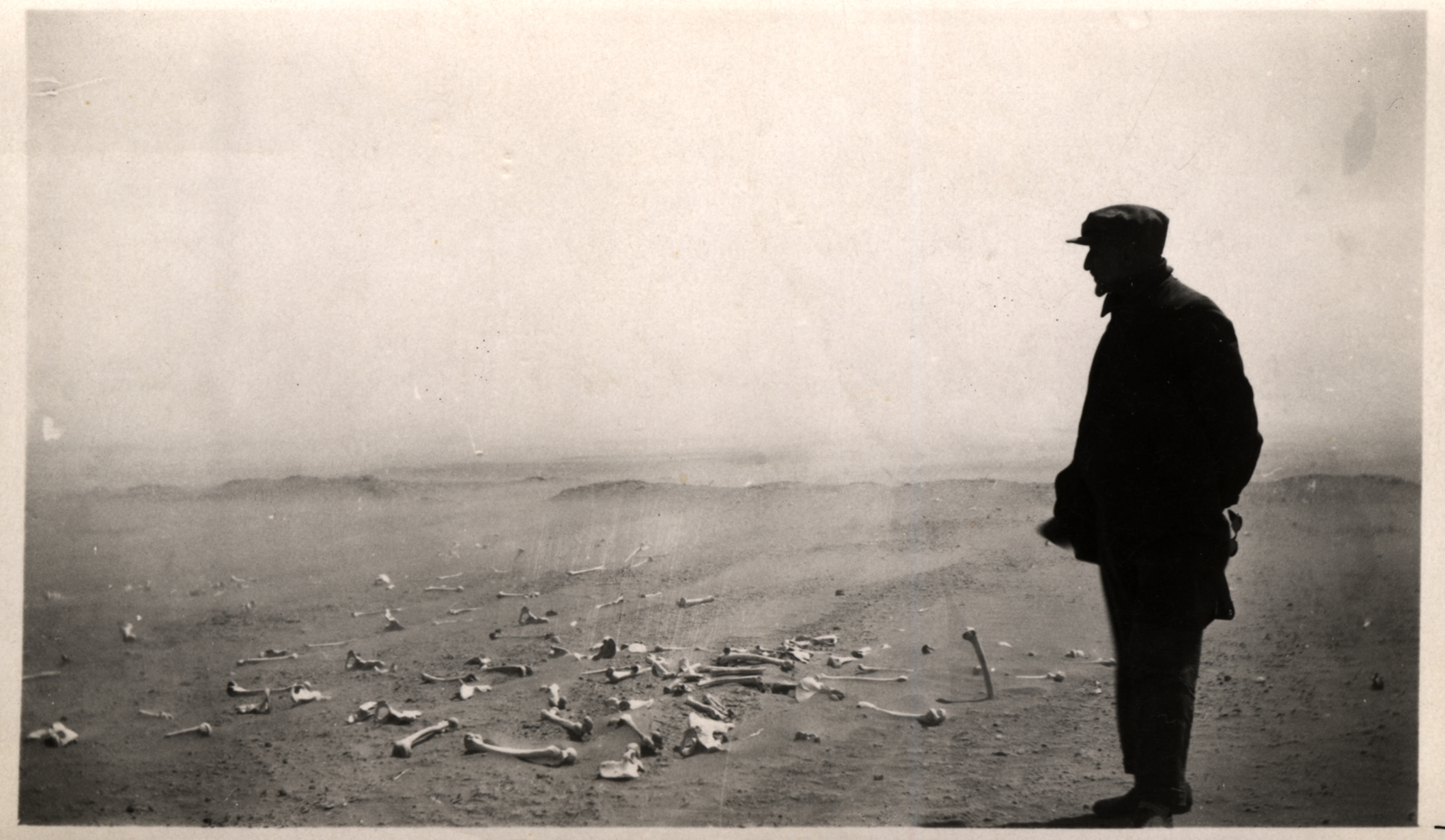
"The Armenian leader Papasian considers the last remnants of the horrific murders at Deir ez-Zor in 1915–1916."

Several prisoners were released with the help of various influential people intervening on their behalf. Five deportees from Çankırı were freed upon the intervention of the United States ambassador Henry Morgenthau. In total, 12 deportees were granted permission to return to Constantinople from Çankırı. (Note: According to Teotig's year book 1916–20 these were: Dikran Ajemian, Mkrtich Garabedian, H. Asadurian, Haig Tiriakian, Shavarsh Panossian, Krikor Siurmeian, Servet, Dr. Parseghian, Piuzant Bozajian, and Dr. Avedis Nakashian.) These were Komitas, Piuzant Kechian, Dr. Vahram Torkomian, Dr. Parsegh Dinanian, Haig Hojasarian, Nshan Kalfayan, Yervant Tolayan, Aram Kalenderian, Noyig Der-Stepanian, Vrtanes Papazian, Karnik Injijian, and Beylerian junior. Four deportees were granted permission to come back from Konya. (Note: According to Teotig's year book 1916–20 these were: Dikran Ajemian, Mkrtich Garabedian, H. Asadurian, Haig Tiriakian, Shavarsh Panossian, Krikor Siurmeian, Servet, Dr. Parseghian, Piuzant Bozajian, and Dr. Avedis Nakashian.) These were Apig Miubahejian, Atamian, Kherbekian, and Nosrigian.

The remaining deportees were under the protection of the governor of Angora Vilayet. Mazhar Bey defied the orders of deportation from Talat Pasha, the Interior Minister, and was replaced by central committee member Atif Bey by the end of July 1915.

=== Survivors ===
After the Armistice of Mudros (30 October 1918), several surviving Armenian intellectuals came back to Constantinople, which was under an allied occupation. They started a short, but intense, literary activity that was ended by the Turkish victory in 1923. Those who have written memoirs and books about their accounts during the deportation include Grigoris Balakian, Aram Andonian, Yervant Odian, Teotig, and Mikayel Shamtanchyan. Other survivors, such as Komitas, developed serious cases of post-traumatic stress disorder. Komitas underwent 20 years of treatment in mental asylums until his death in 1935.

== Day of remembrance ==
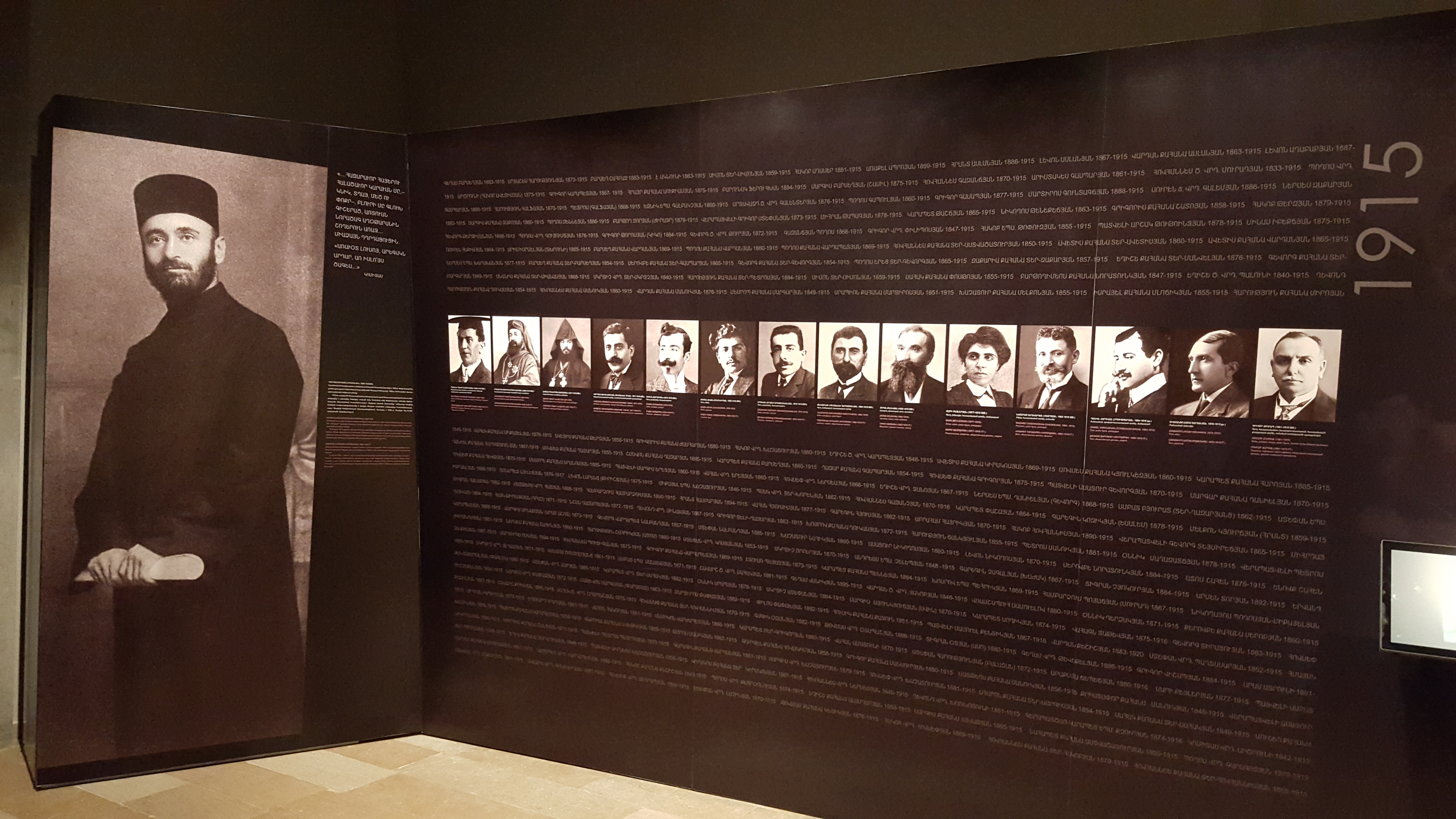
An exhibition dedicated to the deported intellectuals at the genocide museum in Yerevan

The official date of remembrance for the Armenian genocide is 24 April, the day that marked the beginning of the deportation of Armenian intellectuals. The first commemoration, organized by a group of Armenian Genocide survivors, was held in Istanbul in 1919 at the local St.Trinity Armenian church. Many prominent figures in the Armenian community participated in the commemoration. Following its initial commemoration in 1919, the date became the annual day of remembrance for the Armenian genocide.

== Notable deportees ==
Below is a list of prominent Armenian intellectuals, community leaders and other public figures who were deported from Constantinople on 24 April 1915, the first wave of the deportations. The list of names are those which have been provided in the Ottoman Archives and various Armenian sources:

Name (Note: Western Armenian orthography is used throughout the article as the deportees mother language and eyewitness accounts are all Western Armenian.)	Birth date and place (Note: 'From a place' (e.g. from Van, from Kayseri) means place of origin, i.e. a citizen living in Constantinople was often identified with the place his family originally came from.)	Fate	Political affiliation	Occupation	Deported to	Notes
Sarkis Abo; Սարգիս Ապօ		Killed	Dashnak	Teacher	Ayaş	Armenian from Caucasus, killed in Angora (Ankara).
Levon Aghababian; Լեւոն Աղապապեան	1887 from Bitlis	Died		Mathematician, headmaster of high schools in Kütahya and Akşehir (1908–14), directed his own school in Kütahya for three years	Çankırı	Died in 1915.
Hrant Aghajanian; Հրանդ Աղաճանեան		Killed			Çankırı	Brought to the gallows in Beyazıt Square (Constantinople) on 18 January 1916.
Mihran Aghajanian; Միհրան Աղաճանեան		Killed		Banker	Ayaş	Returned to Constantinople where he was brought to the gallows.
Mihran Aghasyan; Միհրան Աղասեան	1854 in Adrianople (Edirne)	Killed		Poet and musician	Der Zor	Deported to Der Zor, where he was killed in 1916.
Khachatur Malumian; Խաչատուր Մալումեան	1865 in Zangezur	Killed	Dashnak	Dashnak militant, newspaper editor, played a role in organizing an assembly of forces in opposition to the Ottoman Sultan, resulting in the proclamation of the Ottoman Constitution in 1908.	Ayaş	Removed from the Ayaş prison on 5 May and taken under military escort to Diyarbakır along with Daghavarian, Jangülian, Khajag, Minassian and Zartarian to appear before a court martial there and they were, seemingly, murdered by state-sponsored paramilitary groups led by Cherkes Ahmet, and lieutenants Halil and Nazım, at a locality called Karacaören shortly before arriving at Diyarbakır. The murderers were tried and executed in Damascus by Cemal Pasha in September 1915, and the assassinations became the subject of a 1916 investigation by the Ottoman Parliament led by Artin Boshgezenian, the deputy for Aleppo.
Dikran Ajemian; Տիգրան Աճեմեան		Survived			Ayaş	Returned to Constantinople out of a group of ten deportees from Ayaş.
Dikran Allahverdi; Տիգրան Ալլահվերտի		Survived		Member of different patriarchal councils	Ayaş	Returned to Constantinople.
Vahan Altunian; Վահան Ալթունեան		Survived		Dentist	Çankırı	Permitted to return to Constantinople soon after 11 May 1915. He left Çankırı on 6 August 1915, was jailed in Angora, was displaced to Tarson, arrived in Constantinople on 22 September 1915.
Vahram Altunian; Վահրամ Ալթունեան		Died		Merchant	Çankırı	
Aram Andonian; Արամ Անտոնեան	1875 in Constantinople	Survived	Hunchak Հնչակեան Վերակազմ	Writer and journalist; member of Armenian National Assembly	Çankırı	Belonged to the second convoy with only one or two survivors that left Çankırı on 19 August 1915, broke his leg, was jailed in Angora 20–24 August then escaped after hospitalization in Angora Hospital. He joined another caravan of deportees and returned to Constantinople only after Tarsus, Mardin, Der Zor, Haleb, he stayed in concentration camps around the town of Meskene in the desert, published his experiences in his literary work In those dark days, he edited a collection of telegrams, the authenticity of which is disputed, containing Talat Pasha's extermination orders; he assumed directorship of the AGBU Nubar library in Paris from 1928 to 1951.
V. Arabian; Վ. Արապեան				Patriot or educator		
Sarkis Armdantsi; Սարգիս Արմտանցի		Killed			Ayaş	Killed in Angora.
K. Armuni; Գ. Արմունի				Lawyer		
Asadur Arsenian; Ասատուր Արսենեան		Killed		Pharmacist	Çankırı	Belonged to the second convoy with only one or two survivors that left Çankırı on 19 August 1915, jailed in Angora 20–24 August killed en route to Yozgat or died near Der Zor.
Arslanian; Արսլանեան				Merchant(?)	Çankırı	
Artsruni; Արծրունի		Killed		Patriot or educator	Çankırı	
Baruyr Arzumanian; Պարոյր Արզումանեան		Killed			Çankırı	Belonged to the second convoy with only one or two survivors that left Çankırı on 19 August 1915, jailed in Angora 20–24 August, killed en route to Yozgat.
Vahram Asadurian; Վահրամ Ասատուրեան	from Gedikpaşa	Survived		Pharmacist	Çankırı	Deported to Meskene where he served finally in the army as assistant physician and helped Armenian deportees.
H. Asadurian; Յ. Ասատուրեան		Survived		Print office owner	Ayaş	Granted permission to return.
Harutiun Asdurian; Յարութիւն Աստուրեան		Killed			Ayaş	Killed in Angora.
Hrant Asdvadzadrian; Հրանդ Աստուածատրեան		Survived			Ayaş	Returned to Constantinople.
D. Ashkharuni; Տ. Աշխարունի				Patriot or educator		
Atamian; Ադամեան	from Erzurum	Survived		Merchant	Konya	Granted permission to return.
Varteres Atanasian; Վարդերես Աթանասեան	1874	Died	Hunchak	"Headman" (mukhtar) of Feriköy, merchant	Çankırı	Died in 1916 (?)
Yeghise Kahanay Ayvazian; Եղիսէ Քհնյ. Այվազեան	13 October 1870 in Bolu			Clergyman	Jailed in Constantinople for two months	Deported to Konya, Bey Shehir, Konya, Ulukshla, Ereyli (where he met many clergymen from Bardizag), Bozanti, Cardaklik, Tarsus. He left Tarsus on 15 October 1915 in direction of Osmaniye, Islahiye, Tahtaköprü to the outskirts of Aleppo.
Azarik; Ազարիք		Died		Pharmacist	Çankırı	Died in Der Zor.
Grigoris Balakian; Գրիգորիս Պալաքեան	1879 in Tokat	Survived		Clergyman	Çankırı	Escaped. Lived in Manchester and Marseille after the war — Published his memoirs of exile. Died in Marseille in 1934.
Balassan; Պալասան	Muslim from Persia	Killed	Adopted as child by Dashnak	Doorman and coffee boy for editorial staff of Azadamard	Ayaş	Killed despite intervention from Persian Embassy.
Khachig Bardizbanian; Խաչիկ Պարտիզպանեան		Killed		Public figure	Ayaş	Killed in Angora.
Levon Bardizbanian; Լեւոն Պարտիզպանեան	1887 in Kharpert		Dashnak	Physician and director of Azadamard		
Vaghinag Bardizbanian; Վաղինակ Պարտիզպանեան		Survived		Official of the Khayrie navigation company	Çankırı	Permitted to return to Constantinople soon after 11 May 1915.
Zareh Bardizbanian; Զարեհ Պարտիզպանեան		Survived		Dentist	Çankırı	Permitted to return to Constantinople by special telegramme from Talat Pasha on 7 May 1915. The eight prisoners of this group were notified on Sunday, 9 May 1915, about their release and left Çankırı on 11 May 1915.
Manuk Basmajian; Մանուկ Պասմաճեան		Survived		Architect and intellectual	Çankırı	Permitted to return to Constantinople soon after 11 May 1915.
Mkrtich Basmajian (Note: Wrongly recorded as "Barsamian" by Krikor Balakian in his memoirs.); Մկրտիչ Պասմաճեան		Survived		Arms dealer	Çankırı	Sent to İzmit for further interrogations together with other deportees. Fled to Konya. Was deported again, managed to escape halfway to Der Zor and returned to Constantinople.
D. Bazdikian; Տ. Պազտիկեան				Patriot or educator		
Bedig; Պետիկ				Writer, publicist		
Movses Bedrosian; Մովսէս Պետրոսեան			Dashnak	Teacher	Çankırı	Set free as he was a Bulgarian national and returned to Sofia.
G. Beylikjian; Կ. Պէյլիքճեան				Merchant		
Khachig Berberian; Խաչիկ Պէրպէրեան		Survived		Teacher	Ayaş	Returned to Constantinople.
E. Beyazian; Ե. Պէյազեան				Patriot or educator		
Beylerian; Պէյլերեան			Son of Hagop Beylerian		Çankırı	
Hagop Beylerian; Յակոբ Պէյլերեան	1843 from Kayseri(?)	Survived	Father of Beylerian son	Merchant	Çankırı	Permitted to return to Constantinople soon after 11 May 1915, died in 1921(?)
Artin Boghosian; Արթին Պօղոսեան		Survived			Çankırı	"Pardoned on condition on not returning to Constantinople" according to a telegramme from the Ministry of the Interior on 25 August 1915 on the subject of exiles erroneously unlisted in a former 3 August telegramme.
Khachig Boghosian; Խաչիկ Պօղոսեան		Survived		Doctor, psychologist, deputy of the Armenian National Assembly	Ayaş	Arrested 24 April 1915, exiled 3 May 1915. He arrived in Constantinople after further deportation from Ayaş to Angora and Aleppo after the armistice. Lived in Aleppo after the war. Founded a hospital. Published his memoirs of exile – d. 1955 in Aleppo.
Hampartsoum Boyadjian (Mourad); Համբարձում Պօյաճեան (Մուրատ)	1867 in Hadjin (Saimbeyli today)	Killed	Hunchak	Doctor, with a long and well-known history of political activity and agitation, one of the first organizers of the Hunchak in 1888 and one of its leaders, principal organizer of the 1890 Kumkapı affray, leader of the 1894–1895 Sasun revolt, after 1908 Armenian National Assembly delegate from Kumkapı and deputy of Ottoman Parliament from Adana. Mourad was his nom de guerre.	Çankırı	He was led to Kayseri to appear before a court martial and then was executed there in 1915.
Piuzant Bozajian; Բիւզանդ Պօզաճեան		Survived		Member of Armenian National Assembly	Ayaş	Returned to Constantinople.
Gh. Chplakian; Ղ. Չպլաքեան		Survived			Konya	Deported to Konya, Tarsus, Kuşcular, Belemedik. Returned to Constantinople after the armistice.
Yervant Chavushyan; Երունդ Չաւուշեան	1867; Constantinople	Died	Hunchak	Armenian scientist, teacher, editor-in-chief of "Tzayn Hayrenyats" newspaper.	Çankırı	Deported to Hama, Der Zor, where he died from illness. He died at the same time in the same tent in a village near Meskene as Husig A. Kahanay Katchouni.
Chebjie; Ջպճը			Armenian-Catholic	Architect	Çankırı	
Dikran Chökürian; Տիգրան Չէօկիւրեան	1884; Gyumushkana	Killed		Writer, publicist, teacher and chief editor of Vostan.	Ayaş	Killed in Angora; brother of Chökürian below
Chökürian; Չէօկիւրեան				Writer, publicist		Brother of Dikran Chökürian
Kaspar Cheraz; Գասպար Չերազ	1850 in Hasköy	Survived		Lawyer, public figure, brother of Minas Cheraz	Çankırı	Departed from Çankırı in winter after seven months and survived the next three years as refugee in Uşak together with his companions Hovhan Vartaped Garabedian, Mikayel Shamtanchian, Vartan Kahanay Karagözian from Feriköy. After the armistice he returned to Constantinople. He was deported instead of his brother Minas Cheraz who emigrated to France, Kaspar Cheraz died in 1928 in Constantinople.
K. Chukhajian; Գ. Չուհաճեան				Merchant		
Aharon Dadurian; Ահարոն Տատուրեան	1886 in Ovacik (near İzmit)	Survived		Poet	Eregli	Returned to Constantinople after the armistice. After a brief sojourn in Constantinople and Bulgaria, he pursued his studies in Prague (1923–28) and settled in France in the late 1920s. He died in 1965.
Nazaret Daghavarian; Նազարէթ Տաղաւարեան	1862; Sebastia	Killed		Physician, director of Surp Prgitch Hospital, deputy in the Ottoman parliament, deputy for Sivas in the Armenian National Assembly, founding member of Armenian General Benevolent Union.	Ayaş	Removed from the Ayaş prison on 5 May and taken under military escort to Diyarbakır along with Agnouni, Jangülian, Khajag, Minassian and Zartarian to appear before a court martial there and they were, seemingly, murdered by state-sponsored paramilitary groups led by Cherkes Ahmet, and lieutenants Halil and Nazım, at a locality called Karacaören shortly before arriving at Diyarbakır, killed on the way to Urfa. The murderers were tried and executed in Damascus by Cemal Pasha in September 1915, and the assassinations became the subject of a 1916 investigation by the Ottoman Parliament led by Artin Boshgezenian, the deputy for Aleppo.
Danielian; Դանիէլեան		Survived	Hunchak	Tailor	Çankırı	
Boghos Danielian; Պօղոս Դանիէլեան		Died	Dashnak	Lawyer	Çankırı	Died in Der Zor.
Garabed Deovletian; Կարապետ Տէօվլեթեան		Survived		Official of the mint	Çankırı	Permitted to return to Constantinople soon after 11 May 1915.
Nerses Der-Kaprielian (Shahnour); Ներսես Տէր-Գաբրիէլեան (Շահնուր)	from Kayseri	Killed			Çankırı	Belonged to the second convoy with only one or two survivors that left Çankırı on 19 August 1915, jailed in Angora 20–24 August killed en route to Yozgat.
Noyig Der-Stepanian (Note: Teotik lists a M. Stepanian (merchant).); Նոյիկ Տէր-Ստեփանեան	from Erzincan	Survived		Commission agent, merchant and banker	Çankırı	Permitted to return to Constantinople soon after 11 May 1915. About 40 members of his family died.
Parsegh Dinanian; Բարսեղ Տինանեան		Survived		Physician	Çankırı	Permitted to return to Constantinople soon after 11 May 1915. One of the organizers of the commemoration ceremony of 24 April 1919.
K. Diratsvian; Գ. Տիրացուեան				Writer, publicist		
Khor. Dkhruni; Խոր. Տխրունի				Writer, publicist		
Krikor Djelal; Գրիգոր Ճելալ		Survived	Hunchak		Çankırı	Permitted to return to Constantinople soon after 11 May 1915.
Missak Djevahirdjian; Միսաք Ճէվահիրճեան	1858 from Kayseri	Survived		Physician (gynaecologist at the court), member of a tribunal council	Çankırı	Permitted to return to Constantinople on 11 May 1915. The eight prisoners of this group were notified on Sunday, 9 May 1915, about their release and left Çankırı on 11 May 1915. Set free with the help of his friend Pesin Omer Paşa, died in 1924.
Armen Dorian (Hrachia Surenian); Արմէն Տօրեան (Հրաչեայ Սուրէնեան)	1892; Sinop	Killed		French-Armenian poet, editor of "Arene" weekly (Paris), founder of the Pantheist school.	Çankırı	Finished the Sorbonne University in 1914 and returned to Constantinople. Deported to Çankırı, killed in Anatolian desert; was jailed in Angora after Çankırı and killed according to Nshan Kalfayan, killed near Angora.
Chris Fenerjian (Silvio Ricci)		Survived			Ayaş	Set free as Bulgarian national and returned to Bulgaria.
Parunak Ferukhan; Բարունակ Ֆէրուխան	1884 in Constantinople	Killed		Official of Bakırköy (Makriköy) administration and violinist	Çankırı	Belonged to the second convoy with only one or two survivors that left Çankırı on 19 August 1915, jailed in Angora 20–24 August killed en route to Yozgat.
Hovhan Vartaped Garabedian; Յովհան Վրդ. Կարապետեան	22 June 1888 in Brusa	Survived		Clergyman, M.A. of Columbia University, secretary of patriarch Zaven	Çankırı	Studied in the United States, came back in 1914 and was ordained priest on 16 June 1914 in Echmiadzin. He departed from Çankırı in winter after seven months and survived the next three years as refugee in Uşak together with his companions Kaspar Cheraz, Mikayel Shamtanchian, Vartan Kahanay Karagözian from Feriköy. After the armistice he returned to Constantinople and became priest in Gedikpaşa and Balat, member of the religious council. From 20 July 1919 – 5 August 1920 he was elected primate of İzmir. Later he got a higher degree as celibate priest (Ծ. Վրդ.). On 8 January 1921 he left for America and became priest of the St. Lusavorich church in New York. He survived and left the clergy.
Mkrtich Garabedian; Մկրտիչ Կարապետեան		Survived	Armenian-Catholic. Dashnak head of Khoy.	Teacher, Educator, Importer. Student of Mkrtich Khrimian, Egmiatzin.	Ayaş	Granted permission to return to capital as he was wrongly imprisoned in place of the teacher with same name.
Ghazaros; Ղազարոս			Dashnak		Çankırı	Deported in lieu of Marzbed (Ghazar Ghazarian).
Ghonchegülian; Ղոնչէկիւլեան		Died		Merchant from Akn	Çankırı	Died near Meskene.
Krikor Torosian (Gigo); Գրիգոր Թորոսեան (Կիկօ)	1884 in Akn	Killed		Editor of the satirical newspaper Gigo	Ayaş	Killed in Angora.
Gülustanian; Կիւլուստանեան		Killed / Survived		Dentist	Çankırı	"Permitted to reside freely in Çankırı" according to a telegramme from the Ministry of the Interior on 25 August 1915 on the subject of exiles erroneously unlisted in a former 3 August telegramme. Killed in a village called Tüney in 1915, together with Ruben Sevak, Daniel Varoujan and Mağazacıyan in a group of five.
Melkon Gülustanian; Մելքոն Կիւլուստանեան		Survived			Ayaş	Relative of his namesake in Çankırı; set free and returned to Constantinople.
Haig Goshgarian; Հայկ Կօշկարեան		Survived		Editor of Odian and Gigo	Der Zor	Survived deportation to Der Zor and returned to Constantinople after the armistice.
Reverend Grigorian; Սուրբ Հայր Գրիգորեան				Pastor and editor of Avetaper	Çankırı	
Melkon Gülesserian; Մելքոն Կիւլեսերեան		Survived			Çankırı	Permitted to return to Constantinople soon after 11 May 1915.
Mihrdat Haigazn; Միհրդատ Հայկազն		Killed	Dashnak	Patriot or educator, member of Armenian National Assembly, umbrella merchant.	Ayaş	Banished a couple of times and then killed in Angora.
K. Hajian; Գ. Հաճեան		Survived		Pharmacist	Çankırı	Returned from Çankırı after the armistice.
Hampartsum Hampartsumian; Համբարձում Համբարձումեան	1890 in Constantinople	Killed		Writer, publicist	Ayaş	Killed in Angora.
Hovhannes Hanisian; Յովհաննէս Հանիսեան		Survived			Çankırı	"Pardoned on condition on not returning to Constantinople" according to a telegramme from the Ministry of the Interior on 25 August 1915 on the subject of exiles erroneously unlisted in a former 3 August telegramme.
Ardashes Harutiunian; Արտաշէս Յարութիւնեան	1873; Malkara (near Rodosto)	Killed		Writer, publicist		Stayed in Üsküdar on 24 April 1915. Arrested on 28 July 1915 and severely beaten at the Müdüriyet. When his father came to see him he was imprisoned as well. Father and son were deported together with 26 Armenians to Nicomedia (modern İzmit) and jailed in the Armenian church converted into a prison. Finally stabbed to death together with his father near Derbent on 16 August 1915.
Abraham Hayrikian; Աբրահամ Հայրիկեան		Killed		Turkologist, director of Ardi college, member of Armenian National Assembly	Ayaş	Killed in Angora.
K. Hiusian; Գ. Հիւսեան				Patriot or educator		
Haig Hojasarian; Հայկ Խօճասարեան		Survived		Teacher, educator, headmaster of Bezciyan school (1901–1924), politician in Ramgavar	Çankırı	Permitted to return to Constantinople mid-June 1915, deputy of the Armenian National Assembly in 1919 became later chancellor of the Diocese of the Armenian Church of America.
Mkrtich Hovhannessian; Մկրտիչ Յովհաննէսեան		Killed	Dashnak	Teacher	Ayaş	Killed in Angora.
Mkrtich Hovhannessian; Մկրտիչ Յովհաննէսեան		Survived			Ayaş	Deported in lieu of Dashnak member Mkritch Hovhannessian, returned to Constantinople.
Melkon Giurdjian (Hrant); Մելքոն Կիւրճեան (Հրանդ)	1859 in Palu	Killed	Dashnak	Writer, publicist, armenologist, member of Armenian National Assembly	Ayaş	Killed in Angora.
Krikor Hürmüz; Գրիգոր Հիւրմիւզ		Killed		Writer, publicist		
Khachig Idarejian; Խաչիկ Իտարէճեան		Killed		Teacher	Ayaş	Killed in Angora.
Karnik Injijian; Գառնիկ Ինճիճեան		Survived		Merchant	Çankırı	Released upon request.
Aris Israelian(Dkhruni); Արիս Իսրայէլեան (Տխրունի)	1885	Died	Dashnak	Teacher, writer	Çankırı	Was in Konya in 1916, died later under unknown circumstances.
Apig Jambaz; Աբիկ Ճամպազ	from Pera	Died	Armenian-Catholic	Merchant	Çankırı	Permitted to return to Constantinople soon after 11 May 1915.
Harutiun Jangülian; Յարութիւն Ճանկիւլեան	1855 in Van	Killed	Hunchak	One of the organizers of the 1890 Kumkapı affray, political activist, member of Armenian National Assembly, published his memoirs in 1913.	Ayaş	Dispatched to Diyarbakir, but executed after Aleppo between Urfa and Severek by Haci Tellal Hakimoglu (Haci Onbasi) – Removed from the Ayaş prison on 5 May and taken under military escort to Diyarbakır along with Daghavarian, Agnouni, Khajag, Minassian and Zartarian to appear before a court martial there and they were, seemingly, murdered by state-sponsored paramilitary groups led by Cherkes Ahmet, and lieutenants Halil and Nazım, at a locality called Karacaören shortly before arriving at Diyarbakır. The murderers were tried and executed in Damascus by Cemal Pasha in September 1915, and the assassinations became the subject of a 1916 investigation by the Ottoman Parliament led by Artin Boshgezenian, the deputy for Aleppo.
Aram Kalenderian; Արամ Գալէնտէրեան		Survived		Official of the Ottoman Bank		Granted permission to return.
Harutiun Kalfayan; Յարութիւն Գալֆաեան	in Üsküdar	Died	Hunchak	Director of Arhanyan College	Çankırı	Died in 1915. Not to be confused with his namesake, also a deportee but a Dashnak member, who was mayor of Bakırköy (Makriköy) quarter of Constantinople.
Harutiun Kalfayan; Յարութիւն Գալֆաեան (Note: Teotik and Balakian list two B. Kalfayans or Bedros Kalfayans respectively, both killed in Angora (jailed in Ayaş according to Garine Avakian). One of them being mayor of Bakırköy (Makriköy) and Dashnak the other, a merchant, being deported and killed mistakenly.)	1870 in Talas	Died in Angora	Dashnak	Lawyer, mayor of Bakırköy (Makriköy)	Çankırı	Died in 1915. Uncle of Nshan Kalfayan. Not to be confused with his namesake, also a deportee but a Hunchak member, who was a schoolmaster.
Nshan Kalfayan; Նշան Գալֆաեան	16 April 1865 in Üsküdar	Survived		Agronomist, lecturer in agriculture at Berberyan school	Çankırı	Permitted to return to Constantinople soon after 11 May 1915. Moved to Greece in 1924. Invited to Persia in 1927 to administer properties of the Shah. Was a correspondent for the Académie française.
Kantaren; Գանթարեն					Çankırı	
Rafael Karagözian; Ռաֆայէլ Գարակէօզեան		Survived			Çankırı	Permitted to return to Constantinople by a telegramme from Talat Pasha on 7 May 1915.
Takvor Karagözian(?); Թագւոր Գարակէօզեան				Merchant	Çankırı	
Vartan Kahanay Karagözian; Վարդան Քհնյ. Գարակէօզեան	15 July 1877 in Kumkapı, Constantinople	Survived		Clergyman from Feriköy	Çankırı	Departed from Çankırı in winter after seven months and survived the next three years as refugee in Uşak together with his companions Hovhan Vartaped Garabedian, Kaspar Cheraz, Mikayel Shamtanchian. After the armistice he returned to Constantinople.
Aristakes Kasparian; Արիստակէս Գասպարեան	1861 in Adana	Killed		Lawyer, businessman, member of Armenian National Assembly	Ayaş	Killed in Angora.
Husig A. Kahanay Katchouni; Յուսիկ Ա. Քհնյ. Քաջունի	1851 in Arapgir	Died	Dashnak	Clergyman	Çankırı	Deported further and died from illness in a village near Meskene. He died at the same time in the same tent as Yervant Chavushyan.
Kevork Kayekjian; Գէորգ Գայըգճեան		Killed		Merchant	Çankırı	Belonged to the second convoy with only one or two survivors that left Çankırı on 19 August 1915, jailed in Angora 20–24 August killed en route to Yozgat. Three Kayekjian brothers were deported and killed altogether near Angora.
Levon Kayekjian; Լեւոն Գայըգճեան		Killed		Merchant	Çankırı	Belonged to the second convoy with only one or two survivors that left Çankırı on 19 August 1915, jailed in Angora 20–24 August killed en route to Yozgat. Three Kayekjian brothers were deported and killed altogether near Angora.
Mihran Kayekjian; Միհրան Գայըգճեան		Killed		Merchant	Çankırı	Belonged to the second convoy with only one or two survivors that left Çankırı on 19 August 1915, jailed in Angora 20–24 August killed en route to Yozgat. Three Kayekjian brothers were deported and killed altogether near Angora.
Arshak Kahanay Kazazian; Արշակ Քհնյ. Գազազեան		Survived		Clergyman	Çankırı	
Piuzant Kechian; Բիւզանդ Քէչեան	1859	Survived		Editor, owner of influential newspaper Piuzantion, historian	Çankırı	Permitted to return to Constantinople by special telegramme from Talat Pasha on 7 May 1915. The eight prisoners of this group were notified on Sunday, 9 May 1915, about their release and left Çankırı on 11 May 1915. Returned to Constantinople on 1 May 1915 [old calendar](?) and stayed in Plovdiv, Bulgaria, until the end of the war, (Note: Patriarch Zaven Der Yeghiayan was amazed how Piuzant Kechian received permission to get free from detention, and repeats assumptions about him being a spy for the Young Turks.) died in 1927 or 1928.
Vahan Kehiayan(Dökmeji Vahan); Վահան Քէհեաեան	1874 in Urfa	Killed	Hunchak	Patriot or educator and craftsman	Çankırı	Killed on 26 August 1915 together with Ruben Sevak, Daniel Varoujan, Onnik Maghazajian, Artin Kocho.
Diran Kelekian; Տիրան Քէլէկեան	1862; Kayseri	Killed	Ramgavar	Writer, university professor, publisher of a popular Turkish language newspapar, Sabah, freemason, author of a French-Turkish dictionary which is still a reference.	Çankırı	Permitted to reside with his family anywhere outside Constantinople by special order from Talat Pasha on 8 May 1915, chose Smyrna, but was taken under military escort to Çorum to appear before a court martial and killed on 20 October 1915 on the way to Sivas between Yozgat and Kayseri near the bridge Cokgöz on the Kizilirmak.
Akrig Kerestejian; Ագրիկ Քերեսթեճեան	1855 in Kartal	Died		Merchant of wood (coincides with the literal meaning of his name)		
Garabed Keropian; Պատ. Կարապետ Քերոբեան	from Balıkesir	Survived		Pastor (Note: Studied at the theological seminary of Merzifon, worked for the Bible House founded by the American Board of Commissioners for Foreign Missions.)	Çankırı	Permitted to return to Constantinople by special telegramme from Talat Pasha on 7 May 1915. The eight prisoners of this group were notified on Sunday, 9 May 1915, about their release and left Çankırı on 11 May 1915. He went to America.
Mirza Ketenjian; Միրզա Քեթենենճեան		Survived	Dashnak			
Karekin Khajag born as Karekin Chakalian; Գարեգին Խաժակ (Գարեգին Չագալեան)	1867 in Alexandropol	Killed	Dashnak	Newspaper editor, teacher.	Ayaş	Removed from the Ayaş prison on 5 May and taken under military escort to Diyarbakır along with Daghavarian, Agnouni, Jangülian, Minassian and Zartarian to appear before a court martial there and they were, seemingly, murdered by state-sponsored paramilitary groups led by Cherkes Ahmet, and lieutenants Halil and Nazım, at a locality called Karacaören shortly before arriving at Diyarbakır. The murderers were tried and executed in Damascus by Cemal Pasha in September 1915, and the assassinations became the subject of a 1916 investigation by the Ottoman Parliament led by Artin Boshgezenian, the deputy for Aleppo.
A. Khazkhazian; Ա. Խազխազեան				Merchant		
Kherbekian; Խերպէկեան	from Erzurum			Merchant	Konya	Granted permission to return.
Hovhannes Kilijian; Յովհաննէս Գըլըճեան		Killed		Bookseller	Ayaş	Killed in Angora.
Sarkis Kiljian (S. Srents); Սարգիս Գըլճեան (Ս. Սրենց)		Survived	Dashnak	Teacher, writer, publicist	Çankırı	Escaped from Çankırı to Konya and became Deputy of the Armenian National Assembly in 1919.
Hovhannes Kımpetyan(Kmpetian); Յովհաննէս Գմբէթեան	1894 in Sivas	Killed		Armenian poet and educator	Çankırı	Killed during the deportation in Ras al-Ain.
Artin Kocho (Harutiun Pekmezian); Գոչօ Արթին (Յարութիւն Պէքմէզեան)		Killed		Bread seller in Ortaköy	Çankırı	Killed by 12 çetes on 26 August 1915 6 hours after Çankırı near the han of Tüneh in a group of five.
Kevork or Hovhannes Köleyan; Գէորգ կամ Յովհաննէս Քէօլէեան		Killed			Çankırı	Killed near Angora.
Nerses (Der-) Kevorkian; Ներսէս (Տէր-) Գէորգեան				Merchant	Çankırı	Was betrayed by a competitor.
Komitas; Կոմիտաս	1869 in Kütahya	Survived		Priest, composer, ethnomusicologist, founder of a number choirs (Note: He was also the music teacher of prince Mejid's wife.)	Çankırı	Permitted to return to Constantinople by special telegramme from Talat Pasha on 7 May 1915. The eight prisoners of this group were notified on Sunday, 9 May 1915, about their release and left Çankırı on 11 May 1915 – developed a severe form of Posttraumatic stress disorder and spent twenty years in virtual silence in mental asylums, died 1935 in Paris.
Harutiun Konyalian; Յարութիւն Գօնիալեան		Killed		Tailor	Ayaş	Killed in Angora.
Hagop Korian; Յակոբ Գորեան	from Akn, in his seventies	Survived		Merchant, occasionally a teacher	Çankırı	Permitted to return to Constantinople soon after 11 May 1915. He left Çankırı on 6 August 1915, was jailed in Angora, was displaced to Tarson, arrived in Constantinople on 22 September 1915.
Kosmos; Կոզմոս					Çankırı	
Shavarsh Krissian; Շաւարշ Քրիսեան	1886 in Constantinople	Killed	Dashnak	Writer, publicist, teacher, editor of the first sports magazine of the Ottoman Empire Marmnamarz	Ayaş	He organized gym exercises in Ayaş. Until the deportees of Ayaş had learned about the 20 Hunchakian gallows of 15 June 1915, they were not realising the severity of their situation. The exercises were viewed by the Turkish guards with great suspicion. Shavarsh Krissian was killed in Angora.
M. Kundakjian; Մ. Գունտագճեան				Lawyer		
Levon Larents (Kirishchiyan); Լեւոն Լարենց Քիրիշճեան	1882 in Constantinople	Killed	Hunchak	Poet, translator, professor of literature.	Ayaş	Killed during the deportation in Angora.
Onnik Maghazajian; Օննիկ Մաղազաճեան	1878 in Constantinople	Killed	Chairman of Kumkapı Progressive Society	Cartographer, bookseller	Çankırı	"Permitted to reside freely in Çankırı" according to a telegramme from the Ministry of the Interior on 25 August 1915 on the subject of exiles erroneously unlisted in a former 3 August telegramme. Killed in a village called Tüney in 1915, together with Ruben Sevak, Daniel Varoujan and Gülistanian in a group of five.
Asdvadzadur Manesian(Maniassian); Աստուածատուր Մանեսեան		Survived		Merchant	Çankırı	
Bedros Manikian; Պետրոս Մանիկեան		Survived	Çankırı	Pharmacist		
Vrtanès Mardiguian; Վրթանէս Մարտիկեան		Survived			Ayaş	Deported in a group of 50 persons to Angora, 5 May 1915, dispatched to Ayaş on 7 May 1915, set free in July 1915, returned to Constantinople.
Marzbed (Ghazar Ghazarian); Մարզպետ (Ղազար Ղազարեան)		Died	Dashnak	Teacher	Ayaş	Dispatched around 18 May 1915 to Kayseri to appear before a court martial, worked under fake Turkish identity for the Germans in Intilli (Amanus railway tunnel), escaped to Nusaybin where he fell from a horse and died right before the armistice.
A. D. Mateossian; Ա. Տ. Մատթէոսեան				Lawyer, writer		
Melik Melikian; Մելիք Մելիքեան		Killed			Çankırı	
Simon Melkonian; Սիմոն Մելքոնեան	from Ortaköy	Survived		Architect	Çankırı	Permitted to return to Constantinople soon after 11 May 1915.
Theodoros Menzikian; Թ. Մենծիկեան		Killed		Merchant	Ayaş	Killed in Angora.
Sarkis Minassian born as Aram Ashot; Սարգիս Մինասեան	1873 in Çengiler, Yalova	Killed	Dashnak	Chief editor of Droshak, Editor of Armenian newspaper in Boston till 1909, teacher, writer and political activist in the Ottoman capital after 1909; member of Armenian National Assembly	Ayaş	Removed from the Ayaş prison on 5 May and taken under military escort to Diyarbakır along with Daghavarian, Agnouni, Jangülian, Khajag and Zartarian to appear before a court martial there and they were, seemingly, murdered by state-sponsored paramilitary groups led by Cherkes Ahmet, and lieutenants Halil and Nazım, at a locality called Karacaören shortly before arriving at Diyarbakır. The murderers were tried and executed in Damascus by Cemal Pasha in September 1915, and the assassinations became the subject of a 1916 investigation by the Ottoman Parliament led by Artin Boshgezenian, the deputy for Aleppo.
Krikor Miskjian; Գրիգոր Միսքճեան	1865	Killed	brother of Stepan Miskjian	Pharmacist	Çankırı	Belonged to the second convoy with only one or two survivors that left Çankırı on 19 August 1915, jailed in Angora 20–24 August killed en route to Yozgat, killed near Angora.
Stepan Miskjian; Ստեփան Միսքճեան	1852 in Constantinople	Killed	brother of Krikor Miskjian	Physician	Çankırı	Belonged to the second convoy with only one or two survivors that left Çankırı on 19 August 1915, jailed in Angora 20–24 August killed en route to Yozgat, killed near Angora.
Zareh Momjian; Զարեհ Մոմճեան		Killed		Translator at the Russian Consulate	Çankırı	"Pardoned on condition on not returning to Constantinople" according to a telegramme from the Ministry of the Interior on 25 August 1915 on the subject of exiles erroneously unlisted in a former 3 August telegramme. Belonged to the second convoy with only two survivors that left Çankırı on 19 August 1915, jailed in Angora 20–24 August killed en route to Yozgat.
Apig Mübahejian; Աբիկ Միւպահեաճեան		Survived		Publicist	Konya	Granted permission to return.
Avedis Nakashian; Աւետիս Նագաշեան		Survived		Physician	Ayaş	Was set free 23 July 1915, sent his family to Bulgaria, served in the Ottoman army as captain in the Gülhane Hospital at the time of the Gallipoli campaign and immigrated to the US.
Nakulian; Նագուլեան		Survived		Doctor	Ayaş	Exiled 3 May 1915. Allowed to move free in Ayaş. Returned later to Constantinople.
Hagop Nargilejian; Յակոբ Նարկիլէճեան		Survived		Pharmacist in the army	Çankırı	Permitted to return to Constantinople by special telegramme from Talat Pasha on 7 May 1915. The eight prisoners of this group were notified on Sunday, 9 May 1915, about their release and left Çankırı on 11 May 1915.
Markos Natanian; Մարկոս Նաթանեան		Survived		Member of Armenian National Assembly	Çorum	Survived deportation to Çorum and later to Iskiliben, was permitted to go back.
Hrant Nazarian; Հրանդ Նազարեան					Çankırı	
Serovpe Noradungian; Սերովբէ Նորատունկեան		Killed	Dashnak	Teacher at the Sanassarian college and member of Armenian National Assembly	Ayaş	Killed in Angora.
Nosrigian; Նօսրիկեան	from Erzurum	Survived		Merchant	Konya	Granted permission to return.
Nshan; Նշան		Killed		Tattooist in Kumkapı	Ayaş	Killed in Angora.
Nshan Odian; Նշան Օտեան			Hunchak		Ayaş	
Yervant Odian; Երուանդ Օտեան	1869 in Constantinople	Survived		Writer	Ayaş	Deported August 1915. Accompanied Karekin Vrtd. Khatchaturian (prelate of Konia) from Tarson to Osmanieh. Islamized in 1916 under the name Aziz Nuri in Hama. After failed attempts to escape from Der Zor, Odian worked in a factory for military uniforms together with Armenian deportees from Aintab. Soon afterwards he became translator to the military commander of Der Zor. Finally he was orderly to the commander Edwal of the German garrison in Der Zor and gave account of the killing of the last deportees from Constantinople in the prison of Der Zor as late as January 1918 and described that all the policemen and officials kept Armenian women.
Aram Onnikian; Արամ Օննիկեան		Survived		Merchant, chemist	Çankırı	Son of Krikor Onnikian
Hovhannes Onnikian; Յովհաննէս Օննիկեան		Died		Merchant	Çankırı	Son of Krikor Onnikian; died from illness in Hajkiri near Çankırı.
Krikor Onnikian; Գրիգոր Օննիկեան	1840	Died		Merchant	Çankırı	Father of Aram, Hovhannes and Mkrtich Onnikian; died from illness in Çankırı.
Mkrtich Onnikian; Մկրտիչ Օննիկեան		Died		Merchant	Çankırı	Son of Krikor Onnikian; died in Der Zor.
Panaghogh; Փանաղող				Writer, publicist		
Shavarsh Panossian; Շաւարշ Փանոսեան		Survived		Teacher from Pera.	Ayaş	Granted permission to return.
Nerses Papazian(Vartabed Mashtots); Ներսէս Փափազեան		Killed	Dashnak	Editor of Azadamard, Patriot or educator	Ayaş	Killed in Angora.
Vrtanes Papazian; Վրթանէս Փափազեան		Survived		Tailor	Çankırı	Wrongly deported as he bore the same name as the novelist who escaped to Bulgaria and later to Russia. Permitted to return to Constantinople soon after 11 May 1915.
Ardashes Parisian; Արտաշես Փարիսեան		Survived		Merchant	Çankırı	
Parseghian; Բարսեղեան		Survived			Ayaş	Granted permission to return.
Armenag Parseghian; Արմենակ Բարսեղեան		Survived	Dashnak	Teacher, studied philosophy in Berlin, lived in Pera	Çankırı	Permitted to return to Constantinople soon after 11 May 1915.
H. Parseghian; Յ. Բարսեղեան				Patriot or educator		
Kegham Parseghian; Գեղամ Բարսեղեան	1883 in Constantinople	Killed	Dashnak	Writer, publicist, editor, teacher	Ayaş	Killed in Angora.
Sarkis Parseghian(Shamil); Սարգիս Բարսեղեան (Շամիլ)		Killed		Patriot or educator	Ayaş	
Garabed Pashayan Khan; Կարապետ Փաշայեան Խան	1864 in Constantinople	Killed	Dashnak	Physician, writer former deputy of the Ottoman parliament, member of Armenian National Assembly	Ayaş	First tortured and then killed in Angora.
M. Piosian; Մ. Փիոսեան				Patriot or educator		
Smpad Piurad; Der-Ghazaryants; Սմբատ Բիւրատ; Տէր-Ղազարեանց	1862 in Zeytun (Süleymanlı today)	Died		Novelist, public figure, member of Armenian National Assembly	Ayaş	Killed in Angora.
G. Reisian; Կ. Րէյիսեան				Merchant		
Rostom (Riustem Rostomiants); Րոստոմ (Րիւսթէմ Րոստոմեանց)		Killed		Merchant and public figure	Ayaş	Killed in Angora.
Vramshabuh Samueloff; Վրամշապուհ Սամուէլօֆ		Killed		Merchant Armenian from Russia, banker	Ayaş	Killed in Angora.
Sarafian; Սարաֆեան					Çankırı	
Garabed Sarafian; Կարապետ Սարաֆեան		Killed		Public official	Ayaş	Killed in Angora.
Sato; Սաթօ				Patriot or educator		
Jacques Sayabalian (Pailag); Ժագ Սայապալեան (Փայլակ)	1880 in Konya	Killed	Armenian National Assembly	Interpreter for the British Consul in Konya between 1901 and 1905, then vice-consul for a year and a half. After 1909, journalist in the capital.	Çankırı	Killed in Angora.
Margos Sefer; Մարկոս Սեֆեր		Survived		Lawyer	Ayaş	Deported in place of Markos Natanian and returned to Constantinople.
Vartkes Serengülian; Վարդգէս Սէրէնկիւլեան	1871 in Erzurum	Killed		Deputy in the Ottoman parliament	Dispatched to Diyarbakır to appear before a court martial	Deported 21 May 1915 or 2 June 1915. Same fate as Krikor Zohrab. (Cherkes Ahmet and Halil were led to Damascus and executed there on orders from Cemal Pasha, in connection with the murder of the two deputies, on 30 September 1915, Nazım had died in a fight before that.)
Baghdasar Sarkisian; Պաղտասար Սարգիսեան		Survived			Çankırı	"Pardoned on condition on not returning to Constantinople" according to a telegramme from the Ministry of the Interior on 25 August 1915 on the subject of exiles erroneously unlisted in a former 3 August telegramme.
Margos Servet Effendi (Prudian); Մարկոս Սէրվէթ		Survived		Lawyer from Kartal	Ayaş	Granted permission to return.
Ruben Sevak; Ռուբէն Սեւակ	1885 in Silivri	Killed		Physician, prominent poet and writer, formerly captain in the Ottoman Army during the Balkan Wars	Çankırı	Deported 22 June 1915 but was "Permitted to reside freely in Çankırı" according to a telegramme from the Ministry of the Interior on 25 August 1915 on the subject of exiles erroneously unlisted in a former 3 August telegramme. Killed in a village called Tüney in 1915, together with Gülistanyan, Daniel Varoujan and Mağazacıyan in a group of five. His house in Elmadağı, Constantinople is now a museum.
Shahbaz (Note: Not to be confused with Parsegh Shahbaz (listed among the "writers, publicists" on Teotig's list).); Շահպազ				Patriot or educator		
Parsegh Shahbaz; Բարսեղ Շահպազ	1883 in Boyacıköy, Constantinople	Killed	Dashnak	Lawyer, journalist, columnist	Çankırı	"Murdered on Harput-Malatya road." On 6 July 1915, in a letter to Miss. Zaruhi Bahri and Evgine Khachigian, Parsegh Shahbaz wrote from Aintab that due to his wounded feet and stomachaches, he will rest for 6–7 days until he has to continue the 8–10 days journey to M. Aziz. But he had no idea why he was sent there. According to Vahe-Haig (Վահէ-Հայկ), survivor of the massacre of Harput, Parsegh Shahbaz was jailed 8 days after the massacre in the central prison of Mezre. Parsegh Shahbaz remained without food for a week and was severely beaten and finally killed by gendarmes under the wall of 'the factory'.
A. Shahen; Ա. Շահէն				Patriot or educator		
Yenovk Shahen; Ենովք Շահէն	1881 in Bardizag (near İzmit)	Killed		Actor	Ayaş	Killed in Angora.
Sarkis Shahinian; Սարգիս Շահինեան		Survived			Çankırı	"Pardoned on condition on not returning to Constantinople" according to a telegramme from the Ministry of the Interior on 25 August 1915 on the subject of exiles erroneously unlisted in a former 3 August telegramme.
Harutiun Shahrigian (Adom); Յարութիւն Շահրիկեան (Ատոմ)	1860 in Shabin-Karahisar	Killed	Dashnak	Dashnak leader, lawyer, member of Armenian National Assembly.	Ayaş	First tortured and then killed in Angora.
Levon Shamtanchian; Լեւոն Շամտանճեան		Survived			Ayaş	Deported in lieu of Mikayel Shamtanchian, returned to Constantinople.
Mikayel Shamtanchian; Միքայէլ Շամտանճեան	1874	Survived	Friend of Dikran Chökürian	Newspaper editor at Vostan, writer, lecturer, leader in the Armenian National Assembly	Çankırı	Departed from Çankırı in winter after seven months and survived the next three years as refugee in Uşak together with his companions Hovhan Vartaped Garabedian, Kaspar Cheraz, Vartan Kahanay Karagözian from Feriköy. After the armistice he returned to Constantinople. Published his memoirs of exile after the war. – d. 1926
Levon Shashian; Լեւոն Շաշեան		Killed		Merchant		Killed in Der Zor.
Siamanto (Adom Yerdjanian); Սիամանթօ (Ատոմ Եարճանեան)	1878 in Akn	Killed	Dashnak	Poet, writer, member of Armenian National Assembly		Killed in Angora.
Krikor Siurmeian; Գրիգոր Սիւրմէեան		Survived		Father of Artavazd V. Siurmeian.	Ayaş	Granted permission to return to Constantinople.
Onnig Srabian (Onnig Jirayr); Օննիկ Սրապեան (Օննիկ Ժիրայր)	1878 in Erzincan	Killed		Teacher	Ayaş	Killed in Angora.
Yeghia Sughikian; Եղիա Սուղիկեան				Writer, publicist		Met Yervant Odian and Aram Andonian in September 1915 while working in the mill of Aram and Ardashes Shalvarjian in Tarson (supplying daily 30,000 Ottoman soldiers with flour).
S. Svin; Ս. Սուին				Patriot or educator	24 April 1915	
Mihran Tabakian; Միհրան Թապագեան	1878 from Adapazar	Killed	Dashnak	Teacher and writer	Çankırı	Belonged to the second convoy with only one or two survivors that left Çankırı on 19 August 1915, jailed in Angora 20–24 August killed en route to Yozgat.
Garabed Tashjian; Կարապետ Թաշճեան		Killed			Ayaş	Killed in Angora.
Garabed Tashjian; Կարապետ Թաշճեան		Survived		Butcher	Çankırı	Deported in lieu of Garabed Tashjian jailed in Ayaş, released and returned to Constantinople.
Stepan Tatarian; Ստեփան Թաթարեան		Survived		Merchant	Çankırı	Dispatched to Kayseri to appear before a court martial (where he was an eyewitness to executions). Joined by a group of four from Ayaş beginning of July. Survived deportation from Çankırı to Kayseri to Aleppo and returned to Constantinople after the armistice.
Kevork Terjumanian; Գէորգ Թէրճիմանեան		Killed	Ayaş	Merchant		Killed in Angora.
Ohannes Terlemezian; Օհաննես Թէրլէմէզեան	from Van	Survived		Money changer	Çankırı	Permitted to return to Constantinople soon after 11 May 1915. One of the last who was released from Çankırı. He left Çankırı on 6 August 1915, was jailed in Angora, came to Tarson, arrived in Constantinople on 22 September 1915.
Hagop Terzian; Յակոբ Թէրզեան	1879 in Hadjin	Killed	Hunchak	Pharmacist	Çankırı	Belonged to the second convoy with only one or two survivors that left Çankırı on 19 August 1915, jailed in Angora 20–24 August killed en route to Yozgat, killed near Angora.
Haig Tiriakian; Հայկ Թիրեաքեան	about 60 years old	Survived		Cashier of Phoenix	Ayaş	Deported instead of his Dashnak homonym. Returned to Constantinople.
Haig Tiriakian; Հայկ Թիրեաքեան (Հրաչ)	1871 in Trabzon	Killed	Dashnak	Member of Armenian National Assembly	Çankırı	After learning that another Haig Tiriakian had been detained in Ayaş he demanded his namesake's release and his own transfer from Çankırı to Ayaş. He was later killed in Angora.
Yervant Tolayan; Երուանդ Թօլայեան	1883	Survived		Theater director, playwright, editor of the satirical journal Gavroche	Çankırı	Permitted to return to Constantinople by special telegramme from Talat Pasha on 7 May 1915. The eight prisoners of this group were notified on Sunday, 9 May 1915, about their release and left Çankırı on 11 May 1915. Yervant Tolayan died in 1937.
Hagop Topjian; Յակոբ Թօփճեան	1876	Survived	Ramgavar	Editor (Note: Edited a catalogue of the manuscripts of the monastery of Armaş, posthumously Venice 1962.)	Çankırı	Permitted to return to Constantinople mid-June 1915, died in 1951.
Torkom; Թորգոմ				Patriot or educator		
Vahram Torkomian; Վահրամ Թորգոմեան	20 April 1858 in Constantinople	Survived		Physician, (Note: He was also the physician of Patriarch Zaven Der Yeghiayan and Prince Mejid.) medical historian	Çankırı	Permitted to return to Constantinople by special telegramme from Talat Pasha on 7 May 1915. The eight prisoners of this group were notified on Sunday, 9 May 1915, about their release and left Çankırı on 11 May 1915. He moved to France in 1922. He published a book after the war (a list of Armenian doctors) in Évreux, France in 1922 and a study on Ethiopean Taenicide-Kosso in Antwerp in 1929. He died 11 August 1942 in Paris.
Samvel Tumajan (Tomajanian); Սամուել Թումաճան (Թոմաճանեան)		Died	Hunchak		Çankırı	Permitted to return to Constantinople soon after 11 May 1915. Samvel Tomajian/Թօմաճեան (!) died according to Alboyajian.
Daniel Varoujan; Դանիէլ Վարուժան	1884 in Brgnik (near Sivas)	Killed		Poet	Çankırı	Killed together with Ruben Sevak by 12 çetes on 26 August 1915 six hours after Çankırı near the han of Tüneh in a group of five.
Aram Yerchanik; Արամ Երջանիկ	1865	Died		Restaurant owner	Çankırı	Deported because many intellectuals regularly met at his restaurant in Bahçekapı, died in 1915.
D. Yerganian; Տ. Երկանեան				Lawyer		
Krikor Yesayan; Գրիգոր Եսայեան	1883 from Van	Killed	Dashnak	French and Math teacher, translator of Levon Shant's Ancient Gods into French	Çankırı	Belonged to the second convoy with only one or two survivors that left Çankırı on 19 August 1915, jailed in Angora 20–24 August killed en route to Yozgat.
Yeznik; Եզնիկ				Profession	Çankırı	
Nerses Zakarian; Ներսէս Զաքարեան		Killed	Hunchak	Patriot or educator, member of Armenian National Assembly	Ayaş	Killed in Angora.
Avedis Zarifian; Աւետիս Զարիֆեան		Survived		Pharmacist	Çankırı	Permitted to return to Constantinople soon after 11 May 1915.
Rupen Zartarian; Ռուբէն Զարդարեան	1874 in Kharpert	Killed		Writer, poet, newspaper (Azadamard) and textbook editor, considered a pioneer of Armenian rural literature. Translated Victor Hugo, Maxim Gorki, Anatole France, Oscar Wilde into Armenian.	Ayaş	Removed from the Ayaş prison on 5 May and taken under military escort to Diyarbakır along with Daghavarian, Agnouni, Jangülian, Khajag and Minassian to appear before a court martial there and they were, seemingly, murdered by state-sponsored paramilitary groups led by Cherkes Ahmet, and lieutenants Halil and Nazım, at a locality called Karacaören shortly before arriving at Diyarbakır. The murderers were tried and executed in Damascus by Cemal Pasha in September 1915, and the assassinations became the subject of a 1916 investigation by the Ottoman Parliament led by Artin Boshgezenian, the deputy for Aleppo.
Zenop; Զենոբ					Çankırı	
Krikor Zohrab; Գրիգոր Զօհրապ	1861 in Constantinople	Killed		Writer, jurist, deputy in the Ottoman parliament	Dispatched to Diyarbakır to appear before a court martial	Deported either 21 May 1915 or 2 June 1915. Ordered to appear before a court martial in Diyarbakır, together with Vartkes Hovhannes Serengülyan, both went to Aleppo by train, escorted by one gendarme, remained in Aleppo for a few weeks, waited the results of infructuous attempts by the Ottoman governor of the city to have them sent back to Constantinople (some sources mention Cemal Pasha himself intervening for their return, but Talat Pasha insisting on them to send to the court martial), and then dispatched to Urfa and remained there for some time in the house of a Turkish deputy friend, taken under police escort and led to Diyarbakır by car -allegedly accompanied on a voluntary basis by some notable Urfa Armenians, and with many sources confirming, they were murdered by state-sponsored paramilitary groups led by Cherkes Ahmet, Halil and Nazım, at a locality called Karaköprü or Şeytanderesi in the outskirts of Urfa, some time between 15 July and 20 July 1915. The murderers were tried and executed in Damascus by Cemal Pasha in September 1915, and the assassinations became the subject of a 1916 investigation by the Ottoman Parliament led by Artin Boshgezenian, the deputy for Aleppo.
Partogh Zorian(Jirayr); Բարթող Զօրեան (Ժիրայր)	1879 in Tamzara	Killed	Dashnak	Publicist	Ayaş	Killed in Angora.

== Bibliography ==
- Avagyan, Karine (2002). Եղեռնահուշ մասունք կամ խոստովանողք եւ վկայք խաչի [Relic of the Genocide or to those who suffered in the name of the cross and died for their faith] (in Armenian). Yerevan: Zangak 97. ISBN 978-99930-2-436-1. OCLC 62755097.
- Krikor Balakian Հայ Գողգոթան [The Armenian Golgotha], Mechitaristenpresse Vienna 1922 (vol. 1) and Paris 1956 (vol. 2) (a new edition in French: Georges Balakian: Le Golgotha arménien, Le cercle d'écrits caucasiens, La Ferté-Sous-Jouarre 2002 (vol. 1) ISBN 978-2-913564-08-4, 2004 (vol. 2) ISBN 2-913564-13-5)
- Beledian, Krikor (2003). "Le retour de la Catastrophe". In Coquio, Catherine (ed.). L'histoire trouée. Négation et témoignage (in French). Nantes: éditions l'atalante. ISBN 978-2-84172-248-8. [essay about the survivor literature 1918–23]
- Kévorkian, Raymond (2006). Le Génocide des Arméniens [The Armenian Genocide] (in French). Paris: Odile Jacob. ISBN 978-2-7381-1830-1.
- Lapçinciyan, Teotoros (1921). Գողգոթա հայ հոգեւորականութեան [The Golgotha of the Armenian clergy]. Constantinople: H. Mateossian. [Gives an account of over 1.500 deported clergymen all over the Ottoman Empire with selected biographical entries and lists 100 notables of 24 April 1915 by name out of 270 in total and classifies them roughly in nine professional groups]
- Lapçinciyan, Teotoros (1920). Ամէնուն Տարեցոյցը. Ժ-ԺԴ. Տարի. 1916–1920. [Everyman's Almanac. 10.-14. Year. 1916–1920]. Constantinople: G. Keshishian Press.
- Shamtanchian, Mikayel (2007). The Fatal Night. An Eyewitness Account of the Extermination of Armenian Intellectuals in 1915. Translated by Jinbashian, Ishkhan. Studio City, California: Manjikian Publications. ISBN 978-0-9791289-9-8.
- Kuyumjian, Rita Soulahian (2001). Archeology of Madness. Komitas. Portrait of an Armenian Icon. Princeton, New Jersey: Gomidas Institute Taderon Press. ISBN 978-0-9535191-7-0. LCCN 2005551875. OCLC 60664608.
- Der Yeghiayan, Zaven (2002). My Patriarchal Memoirs [Patriarkʻakan hushers]. Translated by Ared Misirliyan, copyedited by Vatche Ghazarian. Barrington, Rhode Island: Mayreni. ISBN 978-1-931834-05-6. LCCN 2002113804. OCLC 51967085.
