= Khachatur Malumian =

Armenian journalist and activist (1863–1915)

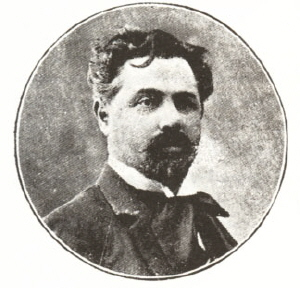
Khachatur Malumian

Khachatur Malumian (Armenian: Խաչատուր Մալումեան; 1863 – 1915), (Note: Reformed orthography spelling: Խաչատուր Մալումյան) also known by the pseudonym E. Aknuni (also Aknouni or Agnouni; Armenian: Է․ Ակնունի), was an Armenian journalist and political activist. He was a member of the Armenian Revolutionary Federation. He was among the first Armenian intellectuals arrested at the beginning of the Armenian genocide in April 1915.

== Biography ==
Khachatur Malumian was born in 1863 in Meghri (in modern day Syunik Province, Armenia) in the Russian Empire. He was first educated in his hometown, then attended the Nersisian School in Tiflis, graduating in 1883. He contributed to the Armenian liberal newspaper Mshak and became the secretary of its editorial staff. He was a collaborator of Mshak's founder Grigor Artsruni and a strong supporter of the latter's ideals. He participated in the negotiations preceding the foundation of the Federation of Armenian Revolutionaries, the first iteration of the Armenian Revolutionary Federation (ARF), as a representative of Artsruni. He then continued his education in Geneva. In 1899, at the insistence of Christapor Mikaelian, one of the founders of the ARF, Malumian joined the staff of Droshak, the ARF's official organ. He wrote a series of articles titled "Caucasian News," which he signed with the pseudonym E. Aknuni.

Malumian became a supporter of Christapor Mikaelian and joined the ARF. He was a member of the party's Western Bureau (the decision-making body responsible for the party's activities in the Ottoman Empire) from 1901. He wrote a work condemning the Russian authorities after the Armenian–Tatar massacres of 1905–1906; the work was translated into French under the title Les plaies du Caucase (The wounds of the Caucasus). He was one of the organizers of the general meetings of the constitutionalist Ottoman opposition parties in 1902 and 1907. In 1907 in Vienna, he was sent as a delegate to the 4th ARF World Congress. He played an important role in preparing the way for the Young Turk Revolution. He moved to Constantinople in 1908 and enthusiastically spoke out in support of the revolution. During the 1909 failed coup against the Young Turk government, Aknuni hid Mehmed Talaat in his own home to help him escape the putschists. In his diary, Armenian politician Krikor Zohrab writes that Aknuni was "the last [ARF member] to part with his Turkophile dreams" as ARF alliance with the CUP broke down. In 1910–11, he gave speeches in Armenian communities in America, Egypt, Lebanon, Izmir, and Erzurum. In August 1914, he participated in the 8th ARF World Congress in Erzurum. In November 1914, Aknuni expressed to Zohrab his regret for his earlier trust in the CUP and expressed his desire to leave the country.

Malumian was among the Armenian intellectuals arrested on 24 April 1915 at the start of the Armenian genocide. He was interned in Ayaş. On June 2, Malumian and five other Armenian political leaders, Rupen Zartarian, Nazaret Daghavarian, Karekin Khajag, Harutiun Jangulian, and Sarkis Minassian, were moved out of Ayaş on the pretense of being transported to Diyarbakır to face a court-martial. In reality, after passing through Aleppo, Malumian and the others were killed on the way between Urfa and Severek in a place called Karacur by members of the paramilitary Special Organization. At the time of the deportation, Aknuni reportedly continued to defend his earlier positions and believed that Talaat was a "noble character," citing the fact that Talaat had visited him two weeks earlier when Aknuni was sick.

== Sources ==
- Dasnabedian, Hratch (1990). History of the Armenian Revolutionary Federation Dashnaktsutiun 1890/1924. Milan: Oemme Edizioni. ISBN 88-85822-11-8.
- Erickson, Edward J. (2013). Ottomans and Armenians: A Study in Counterinsurgency. Springer. ISBN 978-1137362216.
- Gasparyan, E. (1996). "Aknuni Ē." Ակնունի Է. In Khudaverdyan, Kostandin (ed.). Haykakan hartsʻ hanragitaran Հայկական հարց հանրագիտարան [Armenian Question Encyclopedia] (in Armenian). Yerevan: Armenian Encyclopedia Publishing House. pp. 26.
- Kaligian, Dikran Mesrob (2011). Armenian Organization and Ideology Under Ottoman Rule, 1908-1914 (Rev. ed.). New Brunswick, NJ: Transaction. ISBN 978-1412848343.
- Kévorkian, Raymond H. (2010). The Armenian Genocide: A Complete History. London: I. B. Tauris. ISBN 978-1848855618.
- Walker, Christopher J. (1990). Armenia: The Survival of a Nation (Rev. 2nd ed.). ISBN 0-415-04684-X.
