= Parsegh Shahbaz =

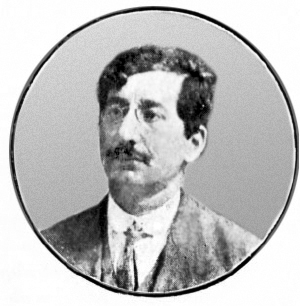
Parsegh Shahbaz

Parsegh Shahbaz (Armenian: Բարսեղ Շահբազ; June 1883 – 1915) was an Ottoman Armenian lawyer, political activist, journalist, and columnist. He was a member of the Armenian Revolutionary Federation. During the Armenian genocide, Shahbaz was deported to Çankırı and then Harput where he was killed.

== Biography ==
"What a pathetic "situational lie" Politics is! How idiotic people are! What is war, what is the state, what is revolution? Why should a few people suffer to revolutionize, and others suffer to restrain them? Why should the youth of some nation be tormented, to kill tormented youth of some other nation? Who has given the right to a class of people to say that this piece of land is "theirs", or that piece of land is "others’ ". Who has given borders? Ahh, idiotic people who pass by life ignorantly, without knowing how to live it, and instead of simplifying it, complicate things, change the Dream into [childbirth] Pain, and would like the "Seas of tears" to become "lakes of tears" at all costs."

— Parsegh Shahbaz (original in Armenian)

Parsegh Shahbaz was born in Constantinople in the district of Boyacikoy in June 1883. He received his early education in Constantinople in the Armenian schools of Mayr Varjaran, Getronagan, and Mkhitarian. He then continued his education in Venice, Italy at the San Lazzaro degli Armeni. During his time in Italy, Shahbaz met Avetis Aharonian who convinced him to join the Armenian Revolutionary Federation. Shahbaz returned to Constantinople where he began publishing the Tsaghig (Armenian: Flower) newspaper. In 1903, after the attempted assassination of Armenian Patriarch of Constantinople Malachia Ormanian, members of the Armenian Revolutionary Federation were blamed. Under intense scrutiny, Shahbaz fled to Alexandria, Egypt. In Egypt, Shahbaz became a laborer for five years while he continued to contribute to various local Armenian journals and newspapers. These newspapers included Azad Khosk, Grag, the Mdrag Periodical, and Hachyun. After the Young Turk revolution in 1908, Shahbaz returned to the Ottoman Empire where he continued his political activism. He then went to Bulgaria and then back to Egypt where he got married in 1912. He then moved to Paris, France in order to continue his studies in law. While in Paris, he continued contributing to various journals such as Mikayel Varandian's Pro Armenia and other newspapers such as Horizon and Hayrenik.

In August 1914, after World War I had begun, Shahbaz returned to Istanbul under the orders of Victor Bérard to gather support for the war effort from Armenian Revolutionary Federation members in the Ottoman Empire on behalf of the Triple Entente.

== Death ==
On 24 April 1915, Parsegh Shahbaz was arrested in Istanbul in the middle of the night deportation of Armenian notables during the Armenian genocide. According to the writer Yervant Odian, who lived an apartment floor below him, Shahbaz's wife was worried and "still hasn't calmed down" for a long time after his arrest.

Shahabaz was deported to Ayash along with other Armenian intellectuals. He was sent to M. Aziz, where it was believed that Shahbaz was "murdered in the road between Harput and Malatya." In a letter to Miss. Zaruhi Bahri and Evgine Khachigian, Shahbaz wrote from Aintab on 6 July 1915 that due to his wounded feet and stomach aches, he would rest for 6–7 days until he had to continue the 8–10 days journey to M. Aziz. But he had no idea why he was sent there. According to B. Vahe-Haig (Պ. Վահէ-Հայկ), survivor of the massacre of Harput, Parsegh Shahbaz was jailed eight days after the massacre in the central prison of Mezre. He remained without food for a week and was severely beaten and finally killed by gendarmes under the wall of 'a factory'.

== See also ==
- Armenian literature
- Ottoman Armenians
- Armenian National Movement
- Western Armenia
