= Harutiun Jangülian =

Armenian politician (1855–1915)

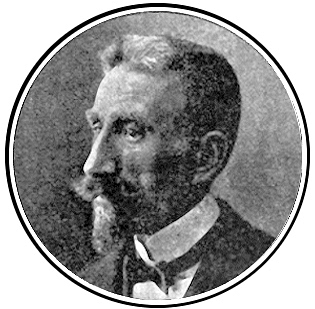
Harutiun Jangülian

Harutiun Jangülian (Armenian: Յարութիւն Ճանկիւլեան; 1855 – 15 June 1915) was an Armenian historian, political activist, and member of the Armenian National Assembly. He was especially known for his involvement in the Kum Kapu demonstration. He spent six years imprisoned in exile. He returned to Constantinople and continued his political activity after his release. Jangülian was arrested on 24 April 1915, at the beginning of the Armenian genocide, deported, and ultimately executed.

== Early life ==
Harutiun Jangülian was born to an Armenian family in 1855 in Van, within the Ottoman Empire. At the time, Van was considered one of the centers of the Armenian Revolutionary Movement. He joined the Social Democrat Hunchakian Party while in Van and moved to Constantinople in 1884. There Jangülian met leading political activist Hampartsoum Boyadjian of the Hnchak party. The two eventually became the chief organizers of the Kum Kapu demonstration.

=== Kum Kapu demonstration ===
Towards the close of the nineteenth century, Armenian revolutionary societies began to agitate for reform and renewed European attention to the Armenian Question. The Hnchak party in particular used mass demonstration tactics.

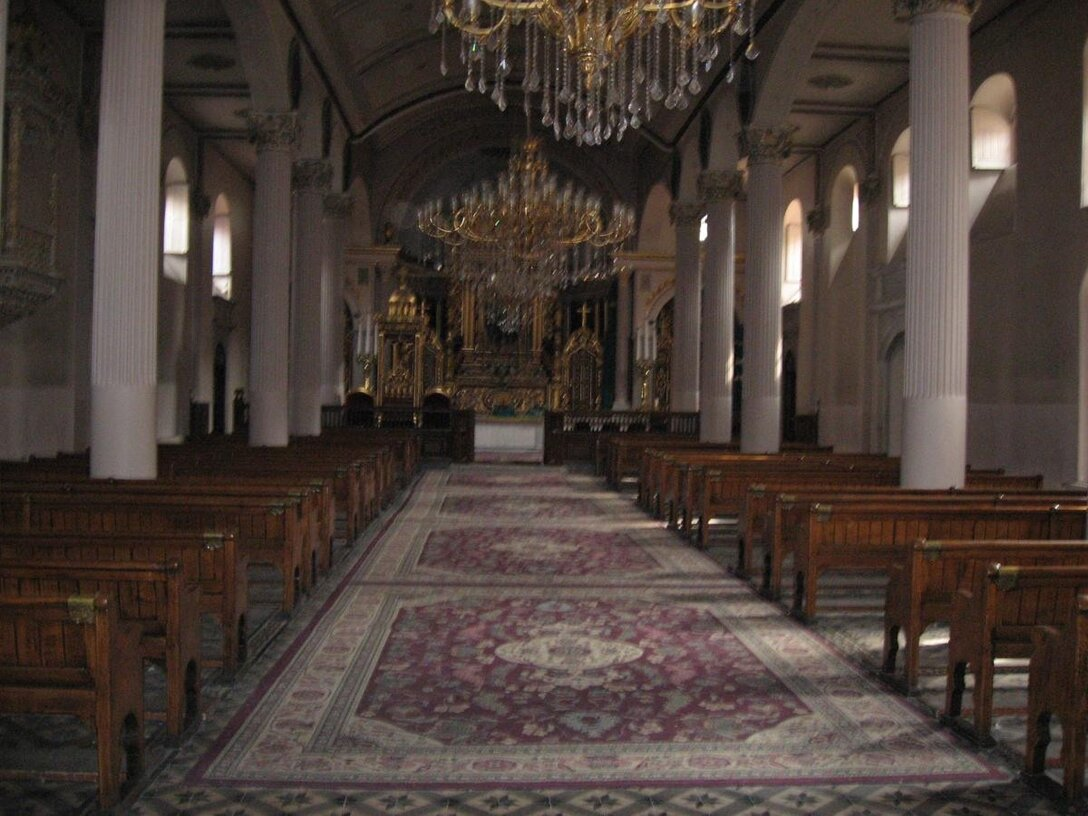
Interior view of Holy Mother-of-God Patriarchal Church where the Kum Kapu demonstration took place and where Jangülian read his declaration at the altar.

The Kum Kapu demonstration took place on 27 July 1890 in Constantinople's Kumkapı district, where the Armenian Patriarchate of Constantinople is located. Jangülian interrupted a mass by stepping onto the altar and reading aloud a statement concerning maltreatment of Armenians, which denounced the church's leadership as indifferent. Demonstrators then forced the patriarch to join a procession heading to Yıldız Palace to demand reforms for the Armenian provinces. As the procession formed, police surrounded the crowd and shots were fired, resulting in several fatalities, including that of a policeman. Other sources claim seven deaths, including four police.

Although some considered Jangülian a hero, he was subsequently sentenced to death, but the Sultan commuted his sentence to life imprisonment in exile. He was exiled to Akka, Palestine and imprisoned in a fortress. He remained there until being pardoned and released in 1896. However, some sources claim he escaped.

=== Life after prison ===
Once free, Jangülian went to Cyprus where he tried to unify the Social Democrat Hunchakian Party, which had become divided over various political disagreements.

Jangülian then moved to Cairo and became an editor of the local Armenian newspaper Timagavor. He later moved to Europe, where he sought to unite various Armenian political parties under one umbrella. After the Young Turk Revolution in 1908, he returned to Constantinople, remaining politically active in the Hunchakian Party. He was elected as a deputy to the Armenian National Assembly representing the district of Gedikpaşa.

In 1913, he published four volumes of his memoirs on Armenian Revolutionary figures and their activities, entitled Memories of the Armenian Crisis (Armenian: Հիշատակներ հայկական ճգնաժամեն).

== Execution ==
Jangülian was one of the Armenian leaders deported during the Armenian genocide. He was arrested on 24 April 1915 and sent via train to Ayaş, a village near Ankara, to be imprisoned along with other Armenian intellectuals. On 2 June, a group including Jangülian, Rupen Zartarian, Sarkis Minassian, Khachatur Malumian, and Nazaret Daghavarian were taken out. Ostensibly, they to be sent to undergo a court-martial in Diyarbakir; however, Jangülian along with the rest were executed en route in the area of Karacur between Urfa and Severek (today Siverek). The order for the execution was given from Captain Şevket to Haci Onbaşı, a member of the Special Organization.
