= Vrtanes Papazian =

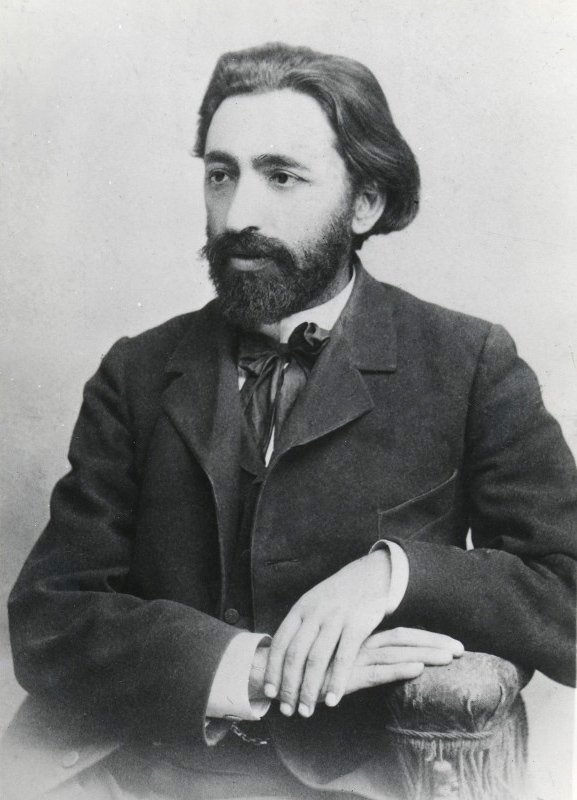
Vrtanes Papazian

Vrtanes Papazian (Armenian: Վրթանէս Փափազեան (Note: Reformed orthography: Վրթանես Փափազյան) [vəɾtʰɑˈnɛs pʰɑpʰɑˈzjɑn]; 12 April 1866 – 26 April 1920) was an Armenian writer, public figure, literary critic, literary historian, editor, teacher and translator.

== Biography ==
Vrtanes Papazian was born in the city of Van in the Ottoman Empire on 12 April 1866. His father, Mesrop Papazian, was a priest, public figure, writer, and educator who founded the first Iranian Armenian theater group in Tabriz in 1879. His family is said to have had Armenian Roma ancestry. Among Vrtanes's siblings were Vahan Papazian, who became a member in the Armenian Revolutionary Federation, and Nerses Papazian, a priest who was one of those arrested on 24 April 1915 and killed during the Armenian genocide. He received his earliest education from his father. In 1868, he moved with his parents to Agulis (now in the Nakhchivan Autonomous Republic of Azerbaijan, then in the Russian Empire), where he attended the local Armenian school. From 1875 to 1878, he attended the Aramian School, an Armenian institution in Tabriz. From 1878 to 1879, he studied at the Gevorgian Seminary in Etchmiadzin. He began working at the age of fifteen and took various jobs, such as laborer, photographer, and telegraph worker. He lived in Shamakhi and then in Baku. He published his first written works in the newspaper Ardzagank in 1883, mainly moralistic stories with Romantic features. He also wrote a novel (not published at the time) titled Knashrjike (The sleepwalker) where he showed interest in exploring the issues of contemporary life.

He moved to Constantinople in 1885, where he wrote for the newspapers Masis and Arevelyan mamul, publishing works on life in Eastern countries and on social issues. From 1887 to 1889, he worked as a teacher in Erzurum, where he became acquainted with an Armenian revolutionary circle. He traveled around Ottoman Armenia, publishing his impressions in a series of articles for the Russian Armenian newspaper Mshak. He eventually enrolled at the University of Geneva, graduating from the department of literature and social sciences in 1894. Papazian taught for many years at various schools in cities such as Van, Erzurum, Tiflis, Tehran, Shusha, Bucharest, Bursa, Nukha, and Etchmiadzin. In 1894, in Tiflis, he edited the illegal newspaper Kriv, the organ of the Armenian Workers' Revolutionary Association. From 1894 to 1896, he edited the weekly Shavigh in Tehran. From 1911 to 1912, he was the de facto editor of the weekly Gharabagh, published in Shusha. He also wrote for various other Armenian, Russian, and European newspapers. For his revolutionary activities, Papazian was constantly targeted by the Russian authorities. He was imprisoned three times and was placed under police surveillance. Some of his works were banned and destroyed, and his manuscripts and books were confiscated. He was one of the Armenian public figures meant to be arrested on 24 April 1915 at the start of the Armenian genocide, but he managed to escape to Bulgaria and from there went to Russia. He suffered from financial difficulties in his last years and died in Yerevan on 26 April 1920.

== Literary works ==
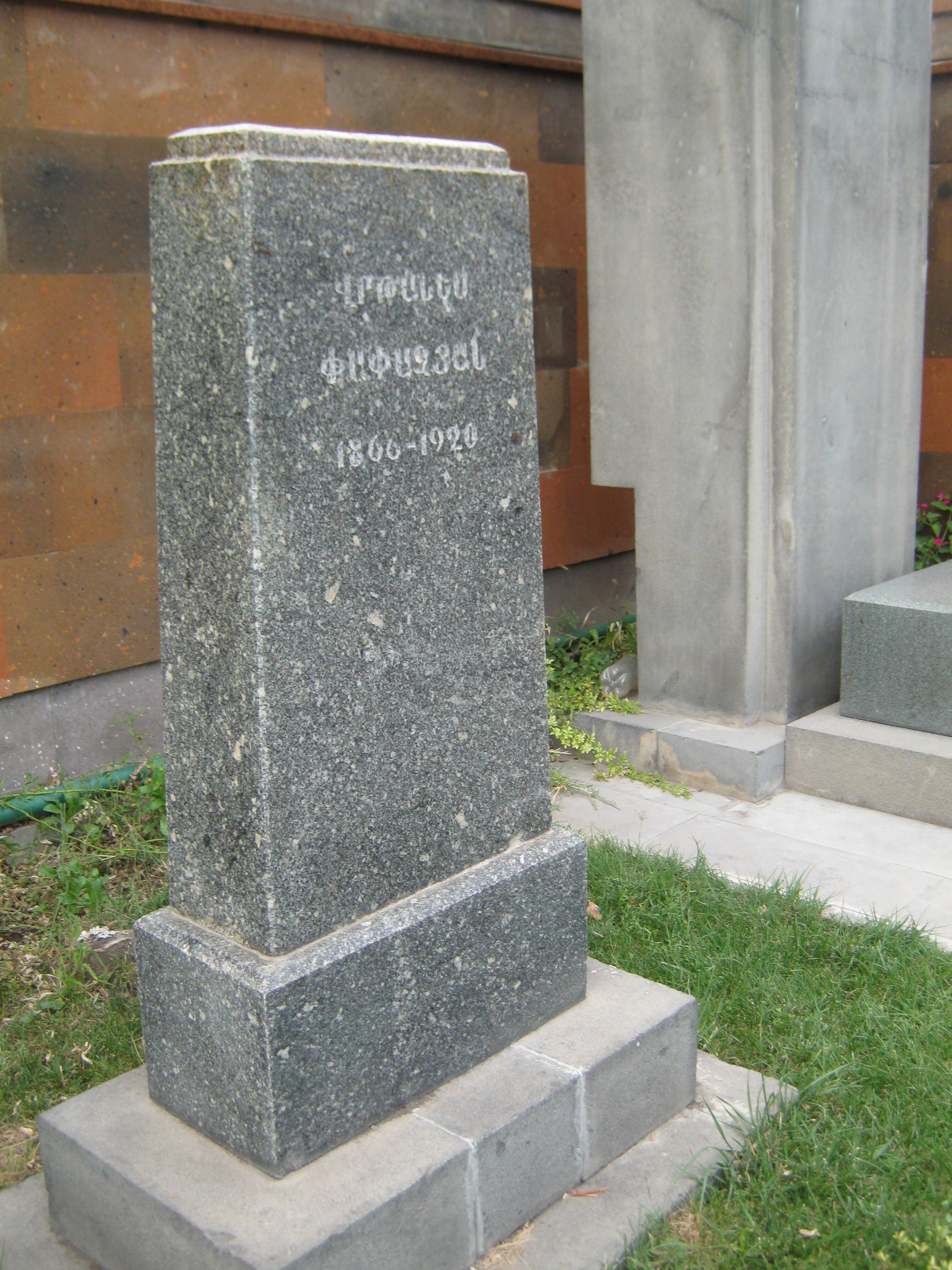
Grave of Vrtanes Papazian, Pantheon cemetery in Yerevan

The writing of Vrtanes Papazian addressed national and social conditions and the survival of the Armenian people. The writer compared Armenian life and culture against the historical and contemporary standards of other nations. His work included prose, dramaturgy, poetry, literary criticism, history of literature, production, music, pedagogy, linguistics, translation, logic, and psychology.

Early writings of Papazian are about the life of Western Armenians. During the 1890s these stories appeared in the press. Later they were published in two books: Scenes from the Life of Turkish Armenians (1889) and Stories from the Life of Turkish Armenians (1904). Speaking about the horrors by Turks and Kurds, he did not ignore the national oppressors showing that their conduct was equally horrible.

Papazian condemned servility and fawn, setting forward tragic scenes from Western Armenian struggle against the organizers of genocide and creating characters of valiant individuals ("Kheran", "Lightning", "Light Pleasures", "The Dying are Greeting You"). He holds a relentless debate against any vicious opinion. The novel Emma strongly criticizes some national parties as being separated from the nation. While based in European countries far from the homeland these parties proclaim themselves as leaders of struggle against tyranny.

Papazian knew fourteen languages and translated the works of a number of authors into Armenian, including Mikhail Saltykov-Shchedrin, Leo Tolstoy, Alphonse Daudet, Nariman Narimanov, Erckmann-Chatrian, Friedrich Nietzsche and Chekri Ganem.
