= Hagop Terzian =

Armenian writer and pharmacist (1879–1915)

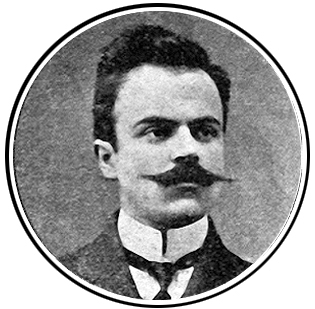
Hagop Terzian

Hagop Terzian (Armenian: Յակոբ Թերզեան; August 22, 1879 – 1915) was an Armenian writer and pharmacist who lived in the Ottoman Empire. The theme of much of his writings was Armenian life and heritage in the region of Cilicia. He published a five volume eye-witness account of the Adana massacre. This publication was confiscated by Ottoman authorities but has been preserved. The entire work was republished by the Gomidas Institute in 2009. Terzian was arrested on 24 April 1915 at the start of the Armenian genocide, deported and eventually murdered.

== Life ==
Hagop Terzian was born on 22 August 1879 in Hadjin (today Saimbeyli) near Adana in Cilicia within the Ottoman Empire. He then moved to Adana where he attended the local Armenian school Hisusian. In 1897 Terzian moved to Constantinople, where he attained a degree in pharmaceutical studies in 1900. He returned thereafter to his native Hadjin, opening pharmacies there and in Adana. Terzian became a correspondent for many Armenian newspapers published in the capital. In his articles, he used the pen-names Hagter, Davros, Hmayag, and Hito among others.

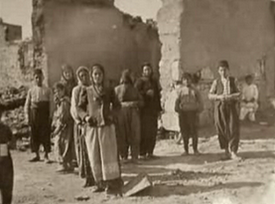
An Armenian town pillaged and left in ruins during the Adana massacre.

In 1909, Terzian witnessed the Adana Massacre. As the event ensued, he wrote accounts of much of what he witnessed. Terzian was a prominent member of the self-defense movement in the Armenian quarter of the city. During the disorder, his pharmacy was set on fire and demolished. Having lost his newborn son during the massacres and having barely survived himself, he fled to Constantinople where he opened a pharmacy called "Adana" in the Kumkapı district. While in Constantinople, Terzian published a book entitled The Life of Adana (1911) and a five volume publication of his memoirs called The Cilician Catastrophe (1912). The original publication of The Cilician Catastrophe was confiscated by Ottoman authorities but the work was ultimately saved.

The Cilician Catastrophe received wide acclaim and is considered an important study of the events in Adana. The Catholicos of Cilicia Sahak II praised Terzian by stating that he "has created an indelible impression upon everyone as a serious and trustworthy chronicler. It is a laborious, inquisitive, vivid picture of the Great Calamity, brought to white light from under the ruins and ashes by a native son of Cilicia, which will remain an everlasting stain upon the glorified civilization and unquenchable humanism of the twentieth century." Archbishop Yeghishe Tourian wrote in a letter to Terzian, "I have read your Giligio Aghedu [The Cilician Catastrophe] with great pain in my heart. It is not a red thread that runs through the white pages of your book, but a wide, black band that stands out defiantly against the bloody pages." Malachia Ormanian, the Armenian Patriarch of Constantinople, described the narrative as "the most complete and perfect work" on the events in Adana.

== Death ==
Hagop Terzian was one of the Armenian leaders deported during the Armenian genocide. On 24 April 1915, he was arrested and sent via train to Ayaş in the interior of the Ottoman Empire. He was later transferred to Çankırı, where he was imprisoned. Along with other Armenians, he was removed from Çankırı on 19 August and sent to Ankara, to be imprisoned again. After being confined there for four days, Terzian and the others were removed from prison on 24 August, ostensibly to be deported to the village of Yozgat. He was murdered en route along with the rest of the group.
