= Dikran Chökürian =

Dikran Chogurian
- Born: 1884; Gümüşhane, Ottoman Empire
- Died: 1915 (aged 31); Ayaş, Ottoman Empire
- Occupations: Novelist, editor, painter, writer, and teacher.

Dikran Chögürian (Տիգրան Չէօկիւրեան, 1884, Gümüşhane, Ottoman Empire – 1915) was an ethnic Armenian writer and teacher, editor of the journal Vostan (Ոստան) and a victim of the Armenian genocide.

== Life ==
He graduated from the Berberian College of Constantinople (now Istanbul) in 1907 and then worked as a teacher in Armenian schools. Chogurian became known in 1910 with the publication of a collection of short stories entitled Voices from the Homeland (Հայրենի Ձայներ). In 1914 he published his most important work, the novel The Monastery (Վանքը), dedicated to the power and victory of civilization and freedom. He was arrested and killed in 1915 among a number of Armenian intellectuals.

== Sources ==
- "Armenian Question", encyclopedia, ed. by acad. K. Khudaverdyan, Yerevan, 1996, p. 373
