= Krikor Torosian =

Armenian writer, journalist, and publisher

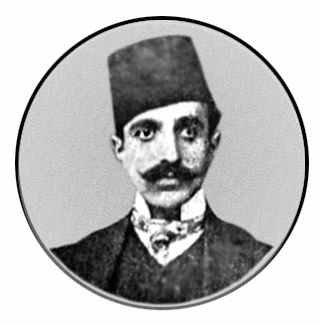
- Krikor Torosian (Gigo)
- Born: 1884; Eğin, Ottoman Empire (today Kemaliye)
- Died: 1915 (age 31)
- Occupations: satirical writer, journalist, and publisher

Krikor Torosian (Armenian: Գրիգոր Թորոսյան, 1884 – 1915) was an Armenian satirical writer, journalist, and publisher. He started his own satirical journal entitled Gigo, which became popular among the Armenians in Constantinople. He is also known for writing an illustrative encyclopedia. He was a victim of the Armenian genocide.

== Life ==
Of Armenian descent, Krikor Torosian was born in Eğin (today Kemaliye) in 1884. At a young age, he moved to Constantinople where he received his early education. He later began to write in the local Armenian newspaper Lila and soon became a renowned figure. Though Torosian would be subsequently known for satire, his early writing style was of a more serious tone. Upon the suggestions of Armenian writers Kasim and Der-Hagopyan, he began writing satirical stories in the newspaper Manzume where he became the chief editor. After the Young Turk revolution of 1908, he founded the periodical Gigo which earned him the pen name Gigo. The periodical published various satirical drawings and caricatures drawn by Torosian himself. He later published an encyclopedia consisting of 300 illustrations.

== Death ==
During the Armenian Genocide numerous Armenian intellectuals and notables, including Krikor Torosian, were arrested and sent to the interior provinces of the Ottoman Empire. Torosian was arrested on 24 April 1915 and sent to Ayaş near Ankara.

During his imprisonment in Ayaş, Torosian continued to draw caricatures. He planned to publish the caricatures and illustrations after being released. However, Torosian and other prisoners were later taken out of prison and sent to Ankara where they were killed. He was killed at the age of 31 and his body was never found.
