= Ardashes Harutiunian =

Ardashes Harutiunian Արտաշէս Յարութիւնեան
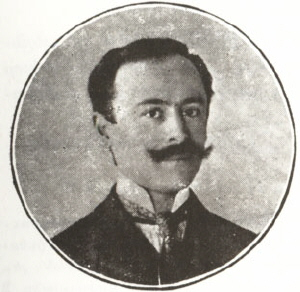
- Born: 3 October 1873; Malkara, Rodosto (Tekirdağ), Ottoman Turkey
- Died: 16 August 1915 (aged 42); Izmit, Ottoman Turkey
- Occupations: Writer, poet, literary critic, translator, and public activist.

Ardashes Harutiunian (Արտաշէս Յարութիւնեան, also used pen-names Manishak, Ban, Shahen-Garo and Garo, 1873, in Malkara, near Rodosto (now Tekirdağ), Ottoman Empire – 16 August 1915) was an Ottoman Armenian poet, a self-educated translator from French and literary critic.

== Life ==
Since 1912 he lived in Constantinople (Istanbul), where he worked as a teacher and contributed to Armenian newspapers. He published his first book of poems, Լքուած քնար (Abandoned Lyre), in 1902, followed by two new volumes, Երկունք (Birth) and Նոր քնար (New Lyre), in 1906 and 1912, respectively. He was one of the first literary critics of contemporary Armenian poets like Misak Medzarents, Daniel Varujan and Siamanto.

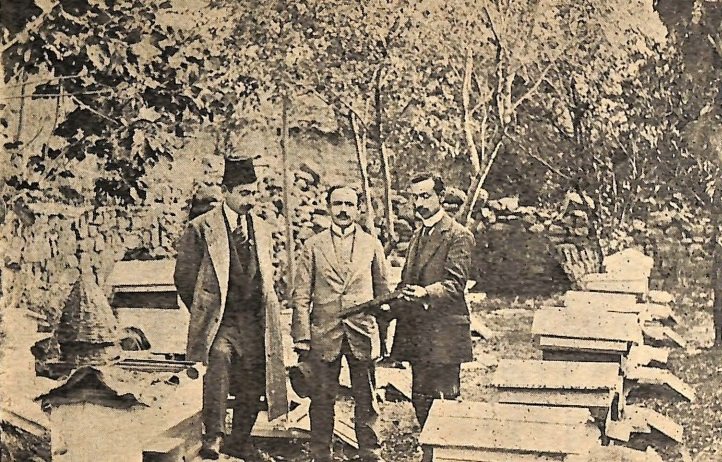
Aram Andonian (with the fez) and Ardashes and Vahan Harutiunian brothers

During the Armenian genocide, he stayed in Scutari (Üsküdar) on 24 April 1915. He was then arrested on 28 July 1915 and severely beaten at the Müdüriyet. When his father came to see him he was imprisoned as well. Father and son were both deported together with 26 Armenians to Nicomedia (modern İzmit) and jailed in the Armenian church that was converted into a prison. They were both stabbed to death together with his father near Derbent on 16 August 1915.

After Harutiunian's death his poems were published in separate books in Paris (1937) and Yerevan (1968). The main topics of his poetry are love, romantics and humanism ("The Tramp in the Night", "Dawn", "Windows").

== Sources ==
- "Armenian Question", encyclopedia, ed. by acad. K. Khudaverdyan, Yerevan, 1996, p. 283
- "Tseghin sirte", Western Armenian poetry, Yerevan, Arevik publ., 1991, ISBN 5-8077-0300-6, p. 706 (biography in Armenian)
- The Heritage of Armenian Literature: Volume III—From the Eighteenth Century to Modern Times, Edited by Agop J. Hacikyan, Edward S. Franchuk, Nourhan Ouzounian, and Gabriel Basmajian
