= Vahan Papazian =

Armenian doctor, politician, and political activist

- Վահան Փափազյան
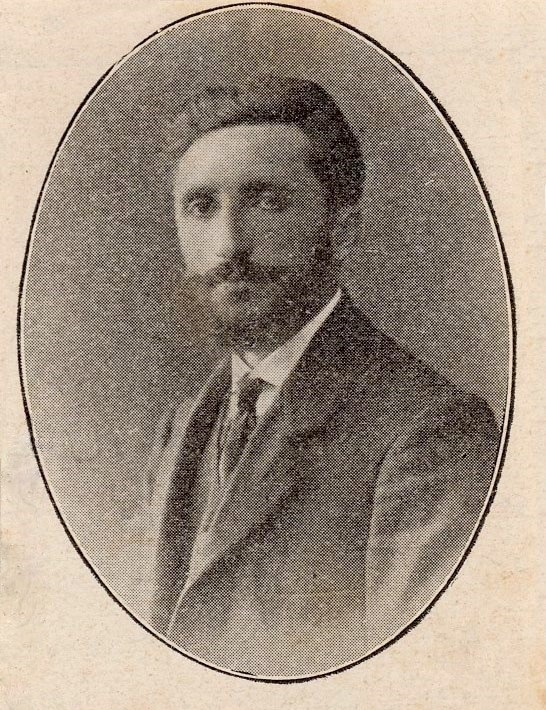
- Born: 1876; Tabriz, Sublime State of Persia (now Iran)
- Died: 1973 (aged 96–97); Beirut, Lebanon
- Political party: Armenian Revolutionary Federation
- Movement: Armenian national liberation movement
- Relatives: Vrtanes Papazian (brother)

Vahan Papazian (Armenian: Վահան Փափազյան; 1876–1973), also known by his pseudonym Goms (Կոմս) was an Armenian medical doctor, politician, political activist who was one of the leaders of the Armenian national liberation movement. He was the younger brother of Vrtanes Papazian.

He was born in Tabriz to parents from Van. Papazian became a leading Armenian figure in the Van region in 1903 and in 1908 was elected to the Ottoman parliament from the Van Vilayet. During the Armenian genocide, he managed to escape to the Caucasus.

From 1942 to 1945, he was a member of the Armenian National Council, established in Berlin with the support of Alfred Rosenberg.

Papazian was fielded by the ARF candidate for the Armenian Orthodox seat in the Metn constituency in the 1951 Lebanese general election. He was included in the pro-government Constitutional List. He obtained 10,186 votes (out of 22,904 votes cast in the constituency), and was defeated by Dikran Tosbath.

He died in Beirut.
