= Yenovk Shahen =

Armenian actor and director

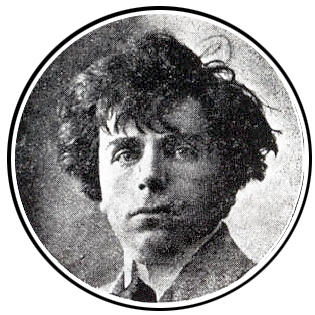
Yenovk Shahen

Yenovk Shahen (Armenian: Ենովք Շահէն; 3 February 1881 – 28 May 1915) was an ethnic Armenian actor and director who lived in the Ottoman Empire. He was killed during the Armenian genocide.

== Life ==
Yenovk Shahen Yepranosian was born to an Armenian family in the village of Bardizag (Bahcecik) near İzmit on 3 February 1881. He was the brother of Krikor Ankut, an arithmetician who was also deported during the Armenian Genocide but managed to survive. After receiving his early education in Bardizag, he and his family moved to Constantinople.

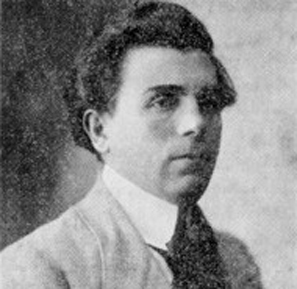
The last known photograph of Yenovk Shahen, published in the Armenian newspaper Verchin Lur on 4 January 1915, a few months before his murder

While in Constantinople, it is noted that Shahen's interest in theatre grew after reading the biography of renowned Armenian playwright Bedros Adamian. He immediately began to play short roles for various plays. Shahen joined a theatrical group led by Mardiros Mnagyan. Thereafter, Shahen switched theatrical groups and joined one that renowned actor Vahram Papazyan already belonged to. Shahen and Papazyan became coworkers and close friends. Continuing his career in acting, Shahen participated in other theatrical groups including those led by Felekian and Zarifyan. Shahen was known for performing throughout the Ottoman Empire including Cairo, İzmir, İzmit, and his native Bardizag.

Some of his most notable roles as an actor included François Coppée's monologue "La grève des forgerons", Triboulet in Victor Hugo's Le roi s'amuse, Iago in Shakespeare's Othello, and Shylock in The Merchant of Venice.

== Death ==
On 24 April 1915, Shahen was arrested at his home in the Nişantaşı district of Constantinople. Arrests were part of the larger scheme of the Armenian Genocide which included deporting Armenian intellectuals from the capital to the interior provinces of the Ottoman Empire.

Shahen was eventually deported to Ayaş near Ankara where he and other Armenian intellectuals were imprisoned. He was eventually removed from prison and murdered near Ankara at the age of 34.
