= Jacques Sayabalian =

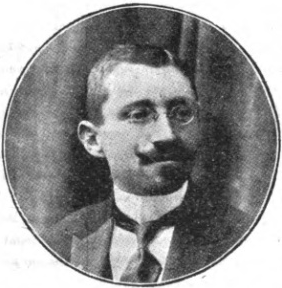
- Born: Jacques Sayabalian (Paylag); June 1880; Konya, Konya Vilayet, Ottoman Empire
- Died: 1915
- Occupations: writer and poet

Jacques or Jack Sayabalian (Paylag) (Armenian: Ժագ Սայապալեան (Փայլակ); June 1880 – 1915) was an Armenian writer and poet who was also an interpreter for the British Consul in Konya between 1904 and 1909, then vice-consul for a year and a half. He was also a member of the Armenian National Assembly representing his birthplace of Konya. After 1909, he became a journalist in Constantinople. During the Armenian genocide, Sayabalian was deported to Ankara and then killed.

== Life ==
Jacques Sayabalian was born in Konya in the Konya Vilayet of the Ottoman Empire in June 1880. His father was the governor of the province of Konya. Sayabalian received his early education at a local school in Konya. In 1896, he went to Constantinople where he attended the prestigious Reteos Berberian Armenian school. Sayabalian continued his education at the American College located in İzmir for two years. A fluent speaker of English, after finishing his studies from the American College in 1904, Sayabalian returned to Konya where he became an interpreter for the British Consul. After working as an interpreter for 5 years, Sayabalian returned to Constantinople where he began writing for various local Armenian newspapers and journals. He became a member of the Armenian National Assembly representing Konya. He also contributed to local Armenian newspapers such as the Surhantag and Massis. When Sayabalian contributed to the Massis newspaper, he signed his poems and stories with the pen-name "V".

== Death ==
Jacques Sayabalian was one of the Armenian leaders deported during the Armenian genocide. On 24 April 1915, Sayabalian was arrested and sent via train to Çankırı, a village located in the interior provinces of the Ottoman Empire. He was then deported to Ankara where he was murdered. His remains are yet to be found.

== See also ==
- Armenian literature
- Ottoman Armenians
- Western Armenia
