= Diran Kelekian =

Ottoman-Armenian journalist (1862–1915)

Diran Kelekian Տիրան Քէլէկեան
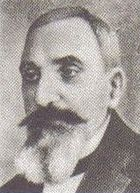
- Born: 1862; Kayseri, Ottoman Empire
- Died: 1915 (aged 52–53); Çankırı, Ottoman Empire
- Occupations: Journalist, editor, writer and professor

Diran Kelekian (Dikran Kelegian, Armenian: Տիրան Քէլէկեան, 1862–1915) was an Ottoman Armenian journalist and professor at the Darülfünûn-u Şahâne (now the University of Istanbul). He was editor of two newspapers, Cihan (since 1883) and Sabah (since 1908).

He studied in Constantinople (Istanbul) and at the French Academy of Sciences at Marseille, then became a lecturer at Ottoman University of Constantinople. He fled to Europe during the anti-Armenian violence of the 1890s and returned to Istanbul in 1898, becoming the editor of Sabah. He soon fled the country again, spending the middle 1900s in Cairo and returning after the Young Turk Revolution. He also worked as a correspondent of Daily Mail and Presse Associe, published journalistic works in Turkish using Armenian letters, compiled a French–Turkish dictionary.

Kelekian was arrested in April 1915 during the Armenian genocide, deported to Çankırı and killed.

== See also ==
- Deportation of Armenian intellectuals on 24 April 1915
