= Tlgadintsi =

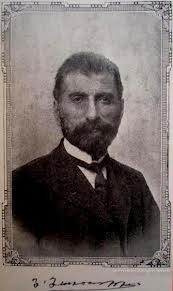
Tlgadintsi

Tlgadintsi or Tlkatintsi (Armenian: Թլկատինցի), Hovhannes Harutiunian (Armenian: Յովհաննես Յարութիւնեան, 1860, Tlkatin village, Kharpert, Ottoman Empire – 1915) was an Ottoman Armenian writer and teacher noted for his leading role in rural literature. He is credited with giving the first authoritative response to a call from Constantinople's Armenian intelligentsia, issued in the early 1890s, for writing firmly rooted in the village life of historic Western Armenia. Tlgadintsi's unique realist works range from probing the darkest corners of village life to revisiting cherished moments of childhood. Through his esteem as a mentor and his power as a writer he opened the way for a new generation of important writers such as Rupen Zartarian, Peniamin Noorigian, Vahé Haig, Vahan Totovents, Hamasdegh, and others.

== Early life and education ==
Tlgadintsi was born in 1860 in the village of Tlgadin (present-day Kuyulu) ten miles south of Kharpert. His father was a farmer who died when Tlgandintsi was quite young, leaving him and his mother in poverty. Despite their misfortune his mother persevered and enrolled him in the parish school to begin his education. On finishing the parish school, Tlgadintsi continued his education at the Smpadian School in Kharpert, where his courses included classical Armenian, grammar, geography, and mathematics.

== Career and outlook ==
By 1878, Tlgadintsi had completed his studies at the Smpadian School and embarked on his dual career as village schoolmaster and journalist, this in the immediate aftermath of the Russo-Ottoman War of 1877-78 which had left the Armenian populace of the Ottoman Empire in widespread misery. He found his first teaching position in the village of Chunkoush (Çüngüş), and he established himself as a writer with the reports he sent to the Constantinople (Istanbul) newspapers Arevelk and Masis through the 1880s. In 1893, responding to the call of the Armenian literati in Constantinople, Tlgadintsi emerged as a distinctive new voice in fiction with the publication in the newspaper Hairenik of "Emily," a satirical sketch about an American missionary and her activities in an Armenian village. This work, the first he signed with the name "Tlgadintsi", was welcomed by the critics and enthusiastically received by the readers.

Tlgadintsi spent his whole life in the immediate environs of Kharpert. His stories focus exclusively on the psychology, values and interpersonal relationships of completely ordinary villagers. In an era when thousands of his compatriots were abandoning their homeland for America, Tlgadintsi stood staunchly opposed to the wave of emigration. He also took a dim view of the famed revolutionary parties of his day and was never affiliated with any of them. At the same time, Tlgadintsi was seriously concerned with the inroads that missionary Protestantism was making among Armenians, an issue at the core of Just One Glass.

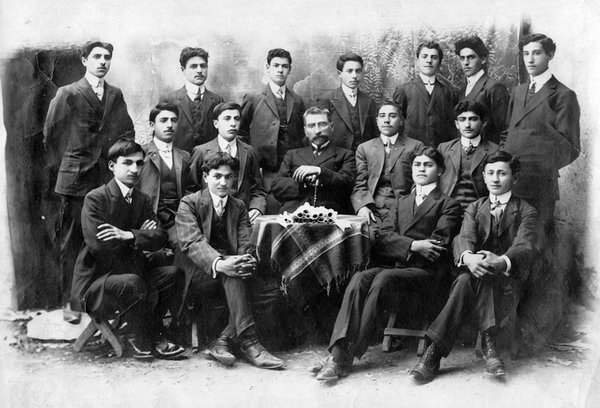
Tlgandintsi and the graduates of his school in 1910

In 1884, Tlgadintsi was appointed director of his alma mater and left his teaching duties to settle in Kharpert. In 1887, he founded the Central National School in Kharpert and in 1888 became its director, a post which he held continuously, with one exception [see below], until his death in 1915. The school stood in Kharpert's Upper Quarter next to St. Hagop church and was commonly known as the Central School or "Red College" because its exterior was painted red. It was also simply designated with Tlgadintsi's name. Its advanced level included courses in Armenian secular and church history, classical and modern Armenian, grammar and composition, English, English literature, French, French literature, Turkish and Turkish composition, mathematics, music, and physics.

In 1895, at the height of the Hamidian massacres, the school was attacked by an anti-Armenian mob and totally burned to the ground. With the return of normalcy, Tlgadintsi and some colleagues managed to open a few classes in a building in the Lower Quarter of Kharpert, while work to rebuild the Central School at its original site was undertaken with the financial help of Kharpert educational associations in the United States. The move back to the original location took place in 1900. The rebuilt school continued to be called the "Red College" even though it was no longer painted red.

In 1903, in the course of a crackdown on Armenian militants, Tlgadintsi was arrested and thrown in jail for nine months as a supposed subversive, along with his leading disciple, Rupen Zartarian. Upon his release, Tlgadintsi was allowed to resume his post as director of the Central School.

== Last moments ==
When Turkish forces arrived in Kharpert in 1915 to destroy its Armenian community, Tlgadintsi found temporary hiding in the house of a childhood Turkish friend of his to whom he entrusted his large collection of unpublished works for safekeeping. Quite notably, the collection included his accounts of the infamous massacres of 1895. One day, Tlgadintsi was completely devastated to learn that in a moment of panic his friend had set fire to the entire collection and reduced it to ash. Shortly afterward, he was found out and thrown into a jail crowded with other Armenian notables. At this point, Tlgadintsi learned that his wife, six daughters, and son had already been sent to their deaths on the deportation routes. Nevertheless, under those grim circumstances he still managed to show a few flashes of his characteristic wit to lift the spirits of his fellow prisoners.

On 20 June 1915, Tlgadintsi was murdered in a gorge near his birthplace in the course of the Armenian Genocide.

== Novels ==
- From Dark Corners
- Just One Glass
- I Have Done My Part
