= Yervant Odian =

Armenian writer (1869–1926)

- Երուանդ Օտեան
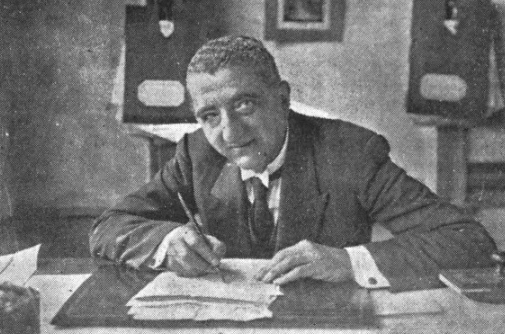
- Born: September 19, 1869; Islambol, Ottoman Empire (modern-day Istanbul, Turkey)
- Died: 1926; Cairo, Egypt
- Citizenship: Ottoman
- Occupations: Satirist, Journalist, Playwright

Yervant Odian (Armenian: Երուանդ Օտեան or Երվանդ Օտյան; 19 September 1869 – 1926) was an Ottoman Armenian satirist, journalist and playwright. He is regarded as one of the most influential Armenian satirists, along with his contemporary Hagop Baronian. He is best known for his work Comrade Panchooni ("Panchooni" being a pun on the Armenian words for "has nothing"), a satire mocking the Armenian revolutionary parties (such as Dashnaks and Hunchaks) of the time.

Born into a wealthy family in Istanbul, Odian left the city during the Hamidian massacres of 1894–1896 and traveled throughout Europe before returning to Istanbul in 1909. Odian was deported to the Syrian desert during the Armenian genocide and survived; he published his memoirs about his experiences during the genocide in 1919.

Odian's writings, which include novels and short stories, often humorously point out humanity's vices. Odian's works also dealt with Armenian-Turkish relations and Muslim-Christian relations. In a 2013 piece written by Eddie Arnavoudian, he proclaimed "Even if elsewhere equaled in modern Armenian literature, Odian's exposure of the establishment's putrid core has certainly not been bettered". Odian's writing styles are often described as extroverted, as if his is removing his persona from the piece in order to best portray the truth.

== Biography ==
=== Early life ===
Odian was born into one of the most affluent families in Constantinople (now Istanbul). His paternal uncle Krikor Odian (1834–1887) was a respected political figure and one of the founders and writers of the Armenian National Constitution. Odian's grandfather Yazedje Boghos Agha was from Palu, Turkey, a town notable for its significant Armenian population. His father was a writer, diplomat, and translator. His mother also came from a wealthy family.

Early in his life, Odian attended the Berberian School in Constantinople, where he began writing. Over the course of his life, Odian became fluent in a number of languages: French, Turkish, and Armenian to name a few. Odian pursued writing thanks to the support of his uncle, who was a major influence in his upbringing. Odian also served as a deputy of the Armenian National Assembly. Though Odian's satires frequently touch on political issues, he never aligned himself with any political party.

In 1896, before the massacres of Armenians in Constantinople ended, Odian left his then-home and traveled across Europe seeking asylum in places like Athens, Paris, Vienna, and London, and Bombay, before finally settling in Cairo.

=== Later life ===
Yervant Odian eventually returned home to Constantinople in 1909, where he continued his work as a writer. In August 1915, during the Armenian genocide, Odian was arrested and deported from Constantinople. In 1916 in Hama, Syria, he was forcibly converted to Islam and given the Muslim name Aziz Nuri, although he refused to practice the religion or use his new Muslim name. He was then deported to Deir ez-Zor, where was able to escape death by becoming a translator for German officials there, since he knew French and Turkish. Odian's horror of the events of the Armenian genocide pushed him to write his memoirs. In 1918, after World War I, he took up the responsibility of rescuing Armenian children orphaned by the genocide and placing them in orphanages. Odian returned to Constantinople and wrote for the newspaper Jamanak. He published his memoirs about his experience in the Armenian genocide in Jamanak in 1919. He left Constantinople in 1922 and lived in Bucharest and various locations in the Near East. Yervant Odian was an avid and heavy drinker. He spent the last days of his life in Cairo, Egypt, where he died in 1926 at the age of 56.

== Legacy ==
Some of Odian's works have been adapted into films in Armenia, including Comrade Panchooni (1992) and Monsieur Jacques and the Others (1964, based on the short story "Geghdz Lrdesě" [The False Spy]). In late 2011 the Armenian General Benevolent Union's Ardavazt Theatre Company performed Odian's Ser yev Dzidzagh (Love and Laughter), a satirical comedy focused around three revolving plots all used in junction with one another in order to portray an accurate image of nineteenth century Armenian society. In 2016 the Armenian Museum of Fresno celebrated the 150th birthday of Odian by hosting an event focused on his life and his literary works. There is a street named after Yervant Odian in the Malatia-Sebastia neighborhood of Yerevan.

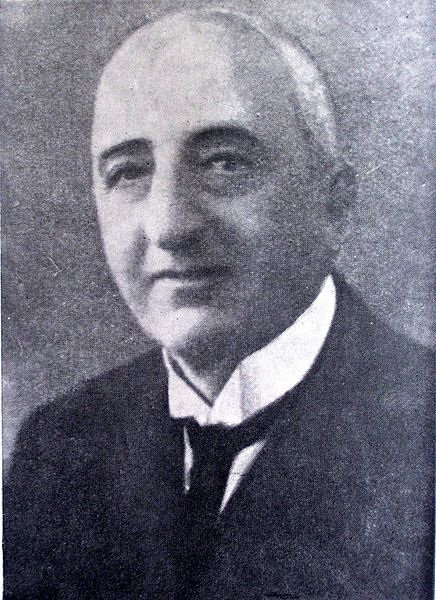
Yervant Odian

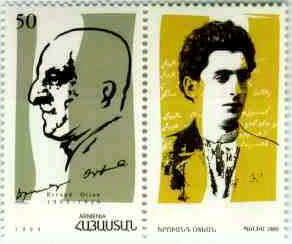
Yervant Odian (left) on an Armenian stamp

== Selected works ==
- Abdulhamid and Sherlock Holmes (Ապտիւլ Համիտ եւ Շէրլօք Հոլմս), Constantinople 1911
- Accursed Years. My Exile and Return from Der Zor, 1914-1919, Garod Books, London 2009
- Comrade Clueless (Ընկեր Փանջունի), Constantinople, from 1914 on (several books)

(also a Turkish edition published as 'Yoldaş Pançuni' by Aras Pub.in 2008) ISBN 978-975-7265-32-0

- Twelve Years Out of Istanbul. 1896-1908 (Տասներկու Տարի Պոլսէն Դուրս. 1896-1908), Constantinople 1922 (Reminiscences)
