= Rupen Zartarian =

Armenian writer and political activist

Rupen Zartarian Ռուբէն Զարդարեան
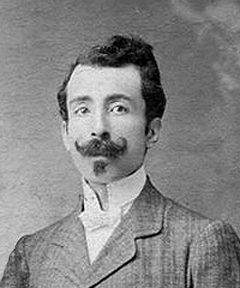
- Born: 1874; Diyarbakir, Ottoman Empire
- Died: 16 August 1915 (aged 41); Diyarbakir, Ottoman Empire
- Occupations: Writer, poet, educator, translator, and political activist.

Rupen Zartarian or Ruben Zardaryan (Armenian: Ռուբեն Զարդարյան Western Armenian: Ռուբէն Զարդարեան; 1874 – 16 August 1915) was an Armenian writer, educator, and political activist. He was killed by Ottoman authorities during the Armenian genocide.

== Life ==
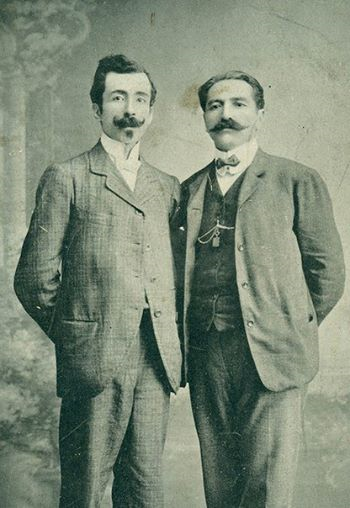
Rupen Zartarian with Andranik Ozanian.

Zartarian was born in 1874 in the city of Diyarbekir but moved to Harput (or Kharpert) (Armenian: Խարբերդ) when he was two. He received his education from the educational institutions of that city.

Zartarian became a student of Tlgadintsi (Hovhannes Harutiunian, 1910–1912), who was a leading figure in rural Armenian literature. Tlgandintsi was also killed by Ottoman authorities during the Armenian Genocide. Zartarian was greatly influenced by his mentor, and his writing career stemmed from the encouragement he obtained. At the age of 18, he started teaching, and for the following decade, he continued in the field of education. At first, he taught at Tlgandinsti's institution, he then spent three years in French religious institutes.

In 1903, Zartarian was arrested by the Ottoman government and subsequently forced to leave the country because of his political activity. He established himself in Bulgaria and in 1906, founded a new newspaper called Razmik. When writing for the newspaper, Zartarian would often reiterate the need for Armenian nationals living outside their homeland to pursue working towards the ultimate goal of an autonomous Armenia. In 1908, he returned to Constantinople, along with many other Armenian intellectuals. A year later, Zartarian worked for the newspaper Azatamart while teaching at the Central Academy.

During the Armenian genocide, Zartarian was taken to Ayaş and kept in prison on 5 May and later taken under military escort to Diyarbakır to appear before a court-martial there and was murdered by Cherkes Ahmet, and lieutenants Halil and Nazım, at a locality called Karacaören shortly before arriving to Diyarbekir.

== Works ==
Zartarian started writing poems at the age of 11, and his articles were published in many newspapers. In 1910, he released a volume called nocturnal clarity (ts'ayglos, Armenian: Ցայգլոս) that was subsequently translated in French. Many of his works were collected by a group called "The Friends of Fallen Authors" and released as a volume in 1930 in Paris.

Zartarian's duties as an editor often hindered his creativity as a writer. He had many responsibilities, and he would have surely produced more books had he been free of them.

Some of his stories include:

- The Petrified (Karatsadznere, Armenian: Քարացածները),
- The Lake's Bride (Dzovagin Harse, Armenian: Ծովակին հարսը),
- Flowers, Red Flowers (Dzaghigner Garmir Dzaghigner, Armenian: Ծաղիկներ, կարմիր ծաղիկներ),
- The Injured Hunter (Zarnevadz Vorsorte Armenian: Զարնուած որսորդը)
- The Prisoner's Tear (Prnavorin Artsoonke Armenian: Բռնաւորին արցունքը)
- HomeLove (Dan Ser Armenian: Տան սէր)

These narratives combine elements of everyday life with fiction. Zartarian developed this blend in a distinctive way, and his poetry often centered on depictions of nature. He is regarded as an early figure in this emerging genre within Armenian literature.

== Writing style ==
Zartarian was a great figure from the rural Armenian scene. He was an admirer of beauty and wrote with a somewhat critical viewpoint. He wrote in Western Armenian and was a connoisseur of the language. Erukhan described his writing as the cleanest, most opulent and haughtiest of their time.

Inspiration was a key element for Zartarian; he often said that the pages on his desk would remain unfilled until he would feel inspired enough to write. He was never in a rush to write and did not see it as a job, but rather as stimulating work. Being more of poet by nature, Zartarian's works are peppered with poetic influences, contributing significantly to the splendor of his works.

== See also ==
- Armenian genocide
- Armenian notables deported from the Ottoman capital in 1915
- Krikor Zohrab
- Erukhan
- Siamanto
