= Nazaret Daghavarian =

Armenian physician

Nazaret Daghavarian Նազարէթ Տաղաւարեան
- Born: 1862; Sebastia, Western Armenia, Ottoman Empire
- Died: 1915 (aged 53); Ayaş, Ottoman Empire
- Occupations: Doctor, agronomist and public activist, one of the founders of Armenian General Benevolent Union.

Nazaret Daghavarian (Armenian: Նազարեթ Տաղավարյան, Western Armenian: Նազարէթ Տաղաւարեան, 1862 in Sebastia, Western Armenia, Ottoman Empire – 1915) was an Ottoman Armenian medical doctor, agronomist and public activist, and one of the founders of the Armenian General Benevolent Union (AGBU). He was an author of scientific works on medicine, religion and history.

== Biography ==
He was born as Chaderjian (Turkish: Çadırcıyan) in Sebastia and studied in the colleges of Constantinople, then finished at the University of Paris. He was the chief director of the Armenian schools of Sebastia province, then directed the Aramian school and St Savior hospital in Constantinople. Being arrested by the Turkish authorities, he was released after mediation by the French embassy and in 1905 he moved to Cairo, where he worked as a doctor and teacher and participated in the foundation of the AGBU charity organization. In 1908 after the Young Turk revolution he returned to Constantinople and was elected as a member of the Ottoman parliament and Armenian National Central Committee. He was a member of the Ramgavar Party (Armenian Democratic Liberal Party), upon which he visited the Caucasus to establish committees for this party. He was one of the founders of the Ottoman Freedom and Accord Party, which was the major opposition party to the Committee of Union and Progress. On April 24, 1915, he was arrested in Constantinople on orders of the CUP and was killed on his way to deportation, during the opening stages of the Armenian genocide.

== Sources ==
- The Doctors who became Victims of the Great Calamity, G. Karoyan, Boston, 1957
- "Armenian Question", encyclopedia, ed. by acad. K. Khudaverdyan, Yerevan, 1996, p. 439
