= List of Ottoman Armenians =

Armenians in the Ottoman Empire include:

== Academia and education ==
- Hrachia Acharian (1876–1953), linguist, lexicographer, etymologist and philologist
- Levon Aghababyan (1887–1915), mathematician
- Hovhannes Bujicanian (1873–1915), academic and teacher
- Haroutioun Hovanes Chakmakjian (1878–1973), linguist and chemist
- Charles Dédéyan (1910–2003), Romance philologist and literature comparatist
- Sirarpie Der Nersessian (1896–1989), art historian
- Karekin Deveciyan (1868–1964), zoologist
- Melkon Giurdjian (1859–1915), teacher and author
- Armenag Haigazian (1870–1921), theologian, educator, scientist, linguist and musician
- Agop Handanyan (1834–1899), physician, author of the first forensic science book in Ottoman Empire
- Varazdat Harutyunyan (1909–2008), Armenian architecture scholar
- Artin Hindoğlu, 19th-century Ottoman etymologist, interpreter, linguist, and author of the first modern French-Turkish dictionary
- Hovhannes Hintliyan (1866–1950), pedagogue, publisher and educator
- Martiros Kavoukjian (1908–1988), Armenian architect, researcher and Armenologist
- Diran Kelekian (1862–1915), journalist and professor at the Darülfünûn-u Şahâne
- Bedros Keresteciyan (1840–1909), linguist, journalist, translator and writer of the first etymology dictionary of the Turkish language
- Hagop Kevorkian (1872–1962), archeologist, connoisseur of art and collector
- Donabed Lulejian (1875–1917), teacher at the Euphrates College
- Abraham Constantin Mouradgea d'Ohsson (1779–1851), Swedish historian and diplomat; best known work deals with the history of the Mongols from Genghis Khan to Timur
- Ignatius Mouradgea d'Ohsson, (1740–1807), orientalist, historian and diplomat in Swedish service
- Krikor Pambuccian (1915–1996), professor of Pathology at the Carol Davila University of Medicine and Pharmacy
- Krikor Peshtimaldjian (1778–1839), philosopher, educator, translator and linguist
- Aram Safrastyan (1888–1966), orientalist and Turkologist
- Arakel Sivaslian (1858–1915), teacher and professor who was the first Ottoman subject to hold a doctorate
- Arshaguhi Teotig (1875–1922), social worker, educator, publicist, writer and translator
- Toros Toramanian (1864–1934), architect and architectural historian

== Arts and architecture ==
- Abdullah Frères, 19th-century official court photographers
- Petros Adamian (1849–1891), actor, poet and writer
- Güllü Agop (1840–1902), theatre director
- Simon Agopian (1857–1921), landscape and portrait painter
- Vardan Ajemian (1905–1977), theatrical director and actor
- Yuhanna al-Armani (1726–1786), artist
- Kurken Alemshah (1907–1947), composer and conductor
- Diran Alexanian (1881–1954), cellist
- Tatul Altunyan (1901–1973), conductor
- Hrand Alyanak (1880–1938), painter and author
- Maide Arel (1907–1997), painter
- Armand (1901–1963), photographer
- Raoul Aslan (1886–1958), theater actor
- Charles Garabed Atamian (1872–1947), painter
- Manuel Azadigian (1901–1924), painter
- Mihran Azaryan (1876–1952), architect
- Hovsep Aznavur (1854–1935), architect
- Hugues de Bagratide (1890–1960), stage and film actor
- Balyan family, family of court architects during the 18th and 19th centuries
- Bedros Magakyan (1826–1891), actor and theater director
- Hampartzoum Berberian (1905–1999), composer, conductor and political activist
- Schahan Berberian (1891–1956), composer, philosopher and psychologist
- Zabelle Boyajian (1873–1957), painter, writer and translator
- Arthur Edmund Carewe (1884–1937), stage and film actor
- Edgar Chahine (1874–1947), painter, engraver and illustrator
- Tigran Chukhajian (1837–1898), composer and conductor; founder of the first opera institution in the Ottoman Empire
- David Çıraciyan (1839–1907), painter
- Mıgırdiç Civanyan (1848–1906), painter
- Yenovk Der Hagopian (1900–1966), artist, sculptor and musician
- Sarkis Diranian (1854–1938), orientalist painter
- Yeghia Dndesian (1834–1881), musician and musical reformer
- Kemani Tatyos Ekserciyan (1858–1913), composer of classical Turkish music
- Stéphan Elmas (1862–1937), composer, pianist and teacher
- Sarkis Erganian (1870–1950), painter
- Manoug Exerjian (1888–1974), architect
- Parunak Ferukhan (1884 – 1915), violinist
- Arshak Fetvadjian (1866–1947), artist, painter and designer
- Nicol Galanderian (1881–1944), composer
- Haroutiun Galentz (1910–1967), painter
- Koharik Gazarossian (1907–1967), composer and pianist
- Arshile Gorky (1904–1948), painter
- Maryam Goumbassian (1831–1909), actress
- Haig Gudenian (1885–1972), violinist, composer and author
- Gabriel Guevrekian (died 1970), architect
- Léon Gurekian (1871–1950), architect, writer and political activist
- Ohannés Gurekian (1902–1984), architect, engineer, and alpinist
- J. Michael Hagopian (1913–2010), filmmaker
- Azniv Hrachia (1853–1920), actress and director
- Zareh Kalfayan (1887–1939), painter
- Parsegh Ganatchian (1885–1967), composer and conductor
- Verkine Karakashian (1856–1933), actress and soprano
- Yeranuhi Karakashian (1848–1924), actress
- Sirvart Kalpakyan Karamanuk (1912–2008), composer, pianist and teacher
- Malak Karsh (1915–2001), photographer
- Yousuf Karsh (1908–2002), photographer
- Sarkis Katchadourian (1886–1947), artist
- Kegham Kavafyan (1888–1959), architect of the Süreyya Opera House
- Shamiram Kelleciyan (1870–1955), kanto singer and songwriter
- Udi Hrant Kenkulian (1901–1978), oud player
- Hambartsum Khachanyan (1894 –1944), film actor
- Komitas (1869–1935), priest, musicologist, composer, arranger, singer, and choirmaster; founder of the Armenian national school of music
- Garabed Krikorian (1847–1920), photographer
- Hampartsoum Limondjian (1768–1839), composer and musical theorist
- Sarkis Lole, 19th-century architect
- Vartan Makhokhian (1869–1937), painter
- Manas family, imperial portraitists to the Sultans of the Ottoman Empire
- Edgar Manas (1875–1964), composer, conductor and musicologist; co-composer of the Turkish National Anthem
- Vahram Manavyan (1880–1952), painter
- Arman Manookian (1904–1931), painter, printmaker and illustrator
- Max Maxudian (1881–1976), film actor
- Mihran Mesrobian (1889–1975), architect; palace architect to the Sultan Mehmed V
- Mesrop of Khizan (c. 1560–c. 1652), Armenian manuscript illuminator
- Zareh Moskofian (1898–1987), painter
- Yenovk Nazarian (1868–1928), portrait and landscape painter
- Hrachia Nersisyan (1895–1961), film actor
- Marika Ninou (1922–1957), rebetiko singer
- Onnik Der Azarian (1883–1935), painter
- Aghavni Papazian, 19th-century actress
- Arousyak Papazian (1841–1907), actress; first professional female actor in the Ottoman Empire
- Manouk Papazian (1911–1999), luthier
- Vahram Papazian (1888–1968), actor
- Stepan Papelyan (1875–1960), composer, pedagogue and author
- Haig Patigian (1876–1950), sculptor
- Peruz (1866–c. 1920), kanto singer
- Hovsep Pushman (1877–1966), artist
- Kamer Sadık (1911–1986), actor
- Ara Sargsyan (1902–1969), sculptor, engraver and educator
- Jean Pascal Sébah (1872–1947), photographer
- Pascal Sébah (1823–1886), photographer
- Yenovk Shahen (1881–1915), actor and director
- Armenag Shah-Mouradian (1878–1939), operatic tenor
- Mimar Sinan (c. 1488–1588), chief Ottoman architect, engineer and mathematician for sultans Suleiman the Magnificent, Selim II and Murad III
- Bedros Sirabyan (1833–1898), painter
- Siranush (1857–1932), actress
- Koharik Şirinyan, 19th-century actress and soprano
- Kınar Sıvacıyan (1876–1950), stage actress
- Panos Terlemezian (1865–1941), landscape and portrait painter
- Vahan Terpanchian (1912–1998), cinematographer and producer
- Tovmas Terzian (1840–1909), playwright, poet and teacher
- Agapios Tomboulis (1891–1965), oud player of rebetiko and Greek, Armenian, Turkish and Jewish folk music
- Édouard Utudjian (1905–1975), architect and urban planner
- Henri Verneuil (1920–2002), filmmaker and playwright
- Yervant Voskan (1855–1914), painter and sculptor
- Karapetê Xaço (c. 1900–2005), singer of traditional Kurdish Dengbêj music
- Garabet Yazmaciyan (1868–1929), painter
- Zabelle Panosian (1891–1986), soprano
- Garo Zakarian (1895–1967), composer and conductor
- Zakar Zakarian (1849–1923), painter
- Ashot Zorian (1905–1970), painter and educator
- Jirayr Zorthian (1911–2004), artist

== Business and philanthropy ==
- Aris Alexanian (1901–1961), businessman and world traveller
- Harutiun Bezjian (1771–1834), philanthropist, merchant, financier, adviser, and founder of the Sourp Prgich Armenian Hospital
- Dadian family, Ottoman Armenian industrial family
- Arthur T. Gregorian (1909–2003), oriental rug dealer and collector
- Calouste Gulbenkian (1869–1955), billionaire businessman, philanthropist and art collector
- Nubar Gulbenkian (1896–1972), business magnate and socialite; during World War II, he helped organize the Pat O'Leary Line
- Moses H. Gulesian (1855–1951), businessman
- Arshag Karagheusian (1872–1963), rug manufacturer and co-owner of A & M Karagheusian
- Dikran Kelekian (1867–1951), collector and dealer of Islamic art
- Dolores Zohrab Liebmann (1896–1991), philanthropist
- Alex Manoogian (1901–1996), industrial engineer, businessman and philanthropist
- Edward Mardigian (1907–1993), engineer, Armenian-American community leader and philanthropist
- George Mardikian (1903–1977), restaurateur, chef, author and philanthropist
- Sikandar Mirza (died 1613), merchant who travelled from Aleppo to Lahore and became a trusted figure within Akbar's court in the Mughal Empire
- Paul Paul (1894–1979), businessman, farmer and politician
- Petik and Sanos, Armenian merchant magnates and Ottoman government tax-farmers from Old Julfa
- Alex Pilibos (1888–1966), philanthropist, businessman and founder of the Rose and Alex Pilibos Armenian School
- Luther Simjian (1905–1997), inventor and entrepreneur; held over 200 patents, mostly related to optics and electronics
- Sarkes Tarzian (1900–1987), engineer, inventor and broadcaster

== Literature and journalism ==
- Mkrtich Achemian (1838–1917), poet
- Vahram Alazan (1903–1966), poet, writer and public activist
- Harutiun Alpiar (1864–1919), journalist and humorous writer
- Aram Andonian (1875–1951), journalist, historian and writer
- Mihran Apikyan (1855–1938), writer and educator
- Arandzar (1877–1913), short story writer and poet
- Arpiar Arpiarian (1851–1908), writer and a political activist
- Hranush Arshagian (1887–1905), poet
- Zabel Sibil Asadour (1863–1934), poet, writer, publisher, educator and philanthropist
- Kégham Atmadjian (1910–1940), poet and editor
- Atrpet (1860–1937), writer
- Yevprime Avedisian (1872–1950), poet and short story writer
- Ben Bagdikian (1920–2016), journalist, news media critic and commentator
- Arsen Bagratuni (1790–1866), poet, scholar and translator
- Hagop Baronian (1843–1891), writer, playwright and journalist
- Vaghinag Bekaryan (1891–1975), poet, writer and pedagogue
- Reteos Berberian (1848–1907), writer, poet and educator; founder of Berberian School
- Nshan Beshiktashlian (1898–1972), poet, writer, satirist and novelist
- Mari Beyleryan (1877–1915), writer and feminist activist
- Krikor Bogharian, 20th-century diarist
- Pailadzou Captanian (1883–1962), memoirist and poet
- Arshag Chobanian (1872–1954), writer, journalist and editor
- Dikran Chökürian (1884–1915), writer and teacher; editor of the journal Vostan
- Diran Chrakian (1875–1921), poet, writer, painter and teacher
- Khachik Dashtents (1910–1974), writer, poet and translator
- Arthur Derounian (1909–1991), journalist and author
- Armen Dorian (1892–1915), poet, teacher and editor
- Paghtasar Dpir (1683–1768), poet, musician, scientist and printer
- Srpouhi Dussap (1840–1901), first female Armenian novelist
- Antranig Dzarugian (1913–1989), writer, poet, educator and journalist
- Eremia Chelebi (1637–1695), writer and intellectual
- Erukhan (1870–1915), writer
- Aram Haigaz (1900–1986), writer
- Hamastegh (1895–1966), poet and writer
- Ardashes Harutiunian (1873–1915), poet, translator and literary critic
- Leon Srabian Herald (1896–1976), poet
- Hovhannes Hisarian (1827–1916), writer, novelist, archeologist, editor, and educator
- Zaruhi Kalemkaryan (1871–1971), prose writer, essayist, poet and philanthropist
- Krikor Kalfayan (1873–1949), writer, lecturer, musician and musicologist
- Shavarsh Krissian (1886–1915), writer, publicist, journalist, educator, and editor of Marmnamarz
- Vahan Kurkjian (1863–1961), author, historian, teacher and community leader
- Levon Larents (1875–1915), writer, translator, journalist, editor, novelist, poet and teacher
- Gurgen Mahari (1903–1969), writer
- M. M. Mangasarian (1859–1943), rationalist and secularist
- Aurora Mardiganian (1901–1994), author and actress
- Hayganuş Mark (1884–1966), feminist writer, poet and opinion journalist
- Misak Metsarents (1886–1908), poet
- Sarkis Minassian (1873–1915), journalist, writer, political activist and educator
- Chavarche Missakian (1884–1957), journalist and intellectual
- Hrand Nazariantz (1886–1962), poet and translator
- Yervant Odian (1869–1926), satirist, journalist and playwright
- Christopher Oscanyan (1818–1895), journalist and writer; Turkish consul in New York
- Hagop Oshagan (1883–1948), writer, playwright and novelist
- Vrtanes Papazian (1866–1920), writer, public figure and literary critic
- Kegham Parseghian (1883–1915), writer, teacher and editor
- Levon Pashalian (1868–1943), short story writer, journalist and editor
- Smpad Piurad (1862–1915), intellectual, writer, publisher and public activist
- Ermance Rejebian (1906–1989), book reviewer, lecturer, broadcaster and writer
- Nigoghos Sarafian (1902–1972), writer, poet, editor and journalist
- Sarmen (1901–1984), poet
- Jacques Sayabalian (1880–1915), writer and poet
- Hovhannes Setian (1853–1930), short story writer, poet and teacher
- Ruben Sevak (1886–1915), poet, prose writer and doctor
- Shahan Shahnour (1903–1974), writer and poet
- Levon Shant (1869–1951), playwright, novelist and poet; founder of the Hamazkayin
- Arshavir Shirakian (1900–1973), writer; assassinated Said Halim Pasha and Cemal Azmi
- Siamanto (1878–1915), writer and poet
- Simon Simonian (1914–1986), intellectual; founder of Spurk
- Hmayak Siras (1902–1983), writer, editor and translator
- Leon Surmelian (1905–1995), writer
- Harutiun Svadjian (1831–1874), writer, political activist and teacher
- Roger Tatarian (1917–1995), vice-president and editor-in-chief of United Press International
- Vahan Tekeyan (1878–1945), poet and public activist
- Teotig (1875–1922), writer, translator, social worker, educator and publicist
- Hagop Terzian (1879–1915), writer and pharmacist
- Tlgadintsi (1860–1915), writer and teacher
- Krikor Torosian (1884–1915), satirical writer, journalist and publisher
- Vahan Totovents (1894–1938), writer, poet and public activist
- Bedros Tourian (1851–1872), poet, playwright and actor
- Tserents (1822–1888), writer
- Karapet Utudjian (1823–1904), journalist, translator and writer
- Daniel Varoujan (1884–1915), poet
- Zareh Vorpuni (1902–1980), novelist, editor and writer
- Gregory Yeghikian (1880–1951), playwright and Pan-Iranist historian
- Nairi Zarian (1900–1969), writer, poet and playwright
- Zaruhi Bahri (1880–1958), writer, social worker and community activist

== Ottoman court, civil service and military ==
- Abraham Pasha (1833–1918), civil servant and diplomat; close friend of Sultan Abdülaziz
- Abro Chelebi (died 1676), purveyor of the Ottoman Army from 1644
- Amirdovlat of Amasia (c. 1420–1496), physician and writer; chief physician to Mehmed II
- Artin Dadyan Pasha (1830–1901) , Deputy Secretary of State for Foreign Affairs in the Ottoman Empire
- Kirkor Bezdikyan, mayor of Adana who was in office from 1877 to 1879
- Artin Boshgezenian (1861-1923), deputy for Aleppo in the General Assembly of the Ottoman Empire of the Constitutional Era
- Anton Çelebi (1604 – 1674), merchant magnate, governor of Bursa; Gonfalonier of Livorno
- Boghos Bey Yusufian (1775–1844), merchant and customs official; Egypt's Minister of Commerce, Minister of Foreign Affairs, and secretary of Muhammad Ali Pasha
- Daniel-Bek of Sassun (1785–1829), Bek in Sassun
- Garabet Artin Davoudian Pasha (c. 1816–1873), career diplomat and the first mutasarrif of Mount Lebanon
- Ermeni Süleyman Pasha (1607–1687), statesman and Grand Vizier of the Ottoman Empire
- Damat Halil Pasha (c. 1570–1629), Grand Vizier of the Ottoman Empire
- Hasan Agha, merchant and Ottoman official in 17th century
- Bedros Kapamajian (1840–1912), textile importer and mayor of Van
- Hagop Kazazian Pasha (1836–1891), Minister of Finance and the Minister of the Privy Treasury during the reign of Sultan Abdulhamid II
- Ohannes Kouyoumdjian (1852–1933), last mutasarrif of the Mount Lebanon Mutasarrifate
- Manouk Avedissian (1841–1925), chief engineer of the Vilayet of Syria and later of the Vilayet of Beirut
- Manuc Bei (1769–1817), merchant, diplomat and boyar; Dragoman of the Porte, Deputy Minister of Foreign Affairs and Grand Treasurer
- Voskan Martikian (1867–1947), politician and the member of the Ottoman Parliament
- Gabriel Noradoungian (1852–1936), statesman; Minister of Trade, and Minister of Foreign Affairs during the reign of Mehmed V
- Krikor Odian (1834–1887), jurist, politician, and writer; key figure in the establishment of the Armenian National Constitution
- Yeğen Osman Pasha, 17th-century Ottoman military officer; commander of sekban units in Anatolia
- Mikael Portukal Pasha (1841–1897), economist and educator; Minister of the Privy Treasury of the Ottoman Empire during the reign of Sultan Abdulhamid II
- Nahapet Rusinian (1819–1876), poet, physician and political activist; contributor to the Armenian National Constitution
- Vartkes Serengülian (1871–1915), member of Ottoman Parliament
- Servitchen ( 1815–1897), physician, educator andpolitician; founder of the first Ottoman medical journal; contributor to the Armenian National Constitution
- Tigrane Pasha (died 1904), politician and the Foreign Minister of Egypt
- Sarkis Torossian (1891–1954), decorated captain who fought in the Gallipoli campaign
- Şivekar Sultan (died 1693), Haseki sultan of Sultan Ibrahim I
- Berç Türker Keresteciyan (1870–1949), bank executive and politician; co-founder of the Turkish Red Crescent
- Nubar Pasha (1825–1899), politician and the first Prime Minister of Egypt
- Hovhannes Vahanian (1832–1891), politician, minister, social activist and reformer
- Vartan Pasha (1813–1879), statesman; founding member to the Ottoman Academy

== Political activism ==
- Yervant Aghaton (1860–1935), agronomist, publisher, writer; founding members of the Armenian General Benevolent Union
- Krikor Amirian (1888–1964), revolutionary; participated in the establishment of the First Republic of Armenia
- Andranik (1865–1927), military commander, statesman and fedayi
- Arabo (1863–1895), fedayi; member of the Armenian Revolutionary Federation
- Aram Achekbashian (1867–1915), politician; member of Social-Democrat Hunchakian Party Central Committee
- Mkrtich Avetisian (1864–1896), journalist and political figure; founding member of Armenakan organization
- Hampartsoum Boyadjian (1860–1915), fedayi; political activist of the Hunchak party
- Vahan Cardashian (1882–1934), political activist and lawyer
- Nazaret Daghavarian (1862–1915), medical doctor, agronomist and public activist; founding member of the Armenian General Benevolent Union
- Mihran Damadian (1863–1945), freedom fighter, political activist, writer and teacher
- Hrayr Dzhoghk (1864–1904), military leader, fedayi, statesman and teacher; member of Armenian Revolutionary Federation
- Armen Garo (1872–1923), activist and politician; member of the Armenian Revolutionary Federation
- Girayr (1856–1894), fedayi; activist of the Social Democrat Hunchakian Party
- Ishkhan (1883–1915), fedayi; member of the Armenian Revolutionary Federation
- Harutiun Jangülian (1855–1915), historian, political activist, and member of the Armenian National Assembly
- Sarkis Jebejian (1864–1920), military leader
- Keri (1858–1916), fedayi; member of the Armenian Revolutionary Federation
- Kevork Chavush (1870–1907), fedayi; member of the Armenian Revolutionary Federation
- Garabed Pashayan Khan (1864–1915), medical doctor and public activist
- Aghasi Khanjian (1901–1936), First Secretary of the Communist Party of Armenia
- Artin Madoyan, 20th-century communist politician
- Makhluto (1875–1956), fedayi commander during the Armenian national movement
- Hrant Maloyan (1896–1978), military serviceman; general officer of the Syrian army; General Command of the Syrian Internal Security Forces
- Mélinée Manouchian (1913–1989), secretary, writer, French resistance fighter and teacher
- Khachatur Malumian (1863–1915), journalist and political activist; member of the Armenian Revolutionary Federation
- Sose Mayrig (1868–1953), fedayi
- Sebastatsi Murad (1874–1918), fedayi
- Shahan Natalie (1884–1983), writer and political activist; principal organizer of Operation Nemesis
- Sebouh Nersesian (1872–1940), military commander
- Boghos Nubar (1851–1930), first president of the Armenian General Benevolent Union
- Vahan Papazian (1876–1973), medical doctor, politician and political activist
- Paramaz (1863–1915), fedayi, writer and political activist
- Berjouhi Bardizbanian-Parseghian (1886–1940), pedagogue, writer and humanitarian worker; member of the First Republic of Armenia Parliament
- Mekertich Portukalian (1848–1921), teacher and journalist; founder of the first Armenian political party, Armenakan
- Garo Sassouni (1889–1977), intellectual, author, journalist and revolutionary
- Aghbiur Serob (1864–1899), military commander
- Parsegh Shahbaz (1883–1915), lawyer, political activist and journalist; member of the Armenian Revolutionary Federation
- Papken Siuni (1873–1896), revolutionary; co-led the 1896 Occupation of the Ottoman Bank
- Hamazasp Srvandztyan (1873–1921), fedayi; member of the Armenian Revolutionary Federation
- Arsène Tchakarian (1916–2018), historian, former tailor and member of the French Resistance
- Soghomon Tehlirian (1896–1960), revolutionary; assassinated Talaat Pasha during the Operation Nemesis
- Gegham Ter-Karapetian (1865-1918), writer and politician; deputy in the Ottoman Chamber of Deputies from the Armenian Revolutionary Federation
- Haig Tiriakian (1871–1915), politician; member of the Armenian National Assembly
- Misak Torlakian (1889–1968), assassin of Behbud Khan Javanshir
- Kegham Vanigian (1889–1915), political activist; founder of the socialist monthly Gaidz of the Hnchak Party
- Arshak Vramian (1870–1915), revolutionary; member of Armenian Revolutionary Federation
- Armenak Yekarian (1870–1926), fedayi
- Aram Yerganian (1900–1934), revolutionary; assassinated Behaeddin Sakir and Fatali Khan Khoyski
- Zabel Yesayan (1878–1943), novelist, poet, writer and teacher
- Rupen Zartarian (1874–1915), writer, educator and political activist
- Krikor Zohrab (1861–1915), writer, politician and lawyer; member of Ottoman Parliament

== Religion ==
- Abraham II of Armenia (died 1737), Catholicos of the Armenian Apostolic Church
- Abraham Petros I Ardzivian (1679–1749), founder of the Armenian Catholic Church
- Ghevont Alishan (1820–1901), Catholic priest, historian, educator and poet.
- Arsen Aydinian (1825–1902), Catholic priest, linguist, grammarian, and polyglot
- Aristaces Azaria (1782–1854), Catholic abbot and archbishop
- Babken I of Cilicia (1868–1936), Catholicos Coadjutor to Sahag II, Catholicos of Cilicia of the Holy See of Cilicia of the Armenian Apostolic Church
- Grigoris Balakian (1875–1934), bishop of the Armenian Apostolic Church
- Ignatius Bedros XVI Batanian (1899–1979), Catholicos and Patriarch of Cilicia
- Raphaël Bayan (1914–1999), Bishop Emeritus of Iskandariya of the Armenians
- Mikayel Chamchian (1738–1823), Mekhitarist monk, historian, grammarian and theologian
- Louis Cheikho (1859–1927), Jesuit Chaldean Catholic priest, orientalist and Theologian
- Zaven I Der Yeghiayan (1868–1947), Armenian Patriarch of Constantinople
- Yeghishe Derderian of Jerusalem (1911–1990), Armenian Patriarch of Jerusalem
- Gomidas Keumurdjian (1656–1707), married priest of the Armenian Apostolic Church and later a convert to the Armenian Catholic Church
- Hovakim I of Constantinople, 15th-century Armenian Patriarch of Constantinople
- Stefano P. Israelian (1866-1915), martyr, final Catholic Bishop of Kharput
- Hovhannes XII Arsharuni (1854–1929), Armenian Patriarch of Constantinople
- Srpuhi Kalfayan (1822–1889), nun and founder of the Order of Kalfayan
- Karapet II of Armenia, 18th-century Catholicos of the Armenian Apostolic Church
- Karekin I Khachadourian (1880–1961), 81st Armenian Patriarch of Constantinople
- Mkrtich Khrimian (1820–1907), Catholicos of All Armenians
- Lazar I of Armenia, 18th-century Catholicos of the Armenian Apostolic Church
- St. Ignatius Maloyan (1869–1915), martyr, Archbishop of Mardin
- Matthew II Izmirlian (1845–1910), Catholicos of All Armenians
- Megerdich I of Cilicia (died 1894), Catholicos of Cilicia
- Mesrob I Naroyan (1875–1944), 80th Armenian Patriarch of Constantinople
- Mesrob Nishanian of Jerusalem (1872–1944), Armenian Patriarch of Jerusalem
- Mkhitar Sebastatsi (1676–1749), Catholic monk, scholar and theologian who founded the Mekhitarist Order
- Nerses II Varzhapetian (1837–1884), Armenian Patriarch of Constantinople
- Tiran Nersoyan (1904–1989), Patriarch-elect of the Armenian Patriarchate of Jerusalem
- Malachia Ormanian (1841–1918), Armenian Patriarch of Constantinople
- Grigor Paron-Ter, 17th-century Armenian Patricarch of Jerusalem
- Sahak II of Cilicia (1849–1939), Catholicos of Cilicia
- Yevnige Salibian (1914–2015), Evangelical minister, homemaker and centenarian
- Shenork I Kaloustian (1913–1990), 82nd Armenian Patriarch of Constantinople
- Garegin Srvandztiants (1840–1892), philologist, folklorist, ethnographer, and ecclesiastic
- Apkar Tebir, 16th-century colonist and priest
- Torkom Koushagian of Jerusalem (1874–1939), Armenian Patriarch of Jerusalem
- Yeghishe Tourian of Jerusalem (1860–1930), Armenian Patriarch of Jerusalem
- Kaloost Vartan (1835–1908), physician and missionary; founder of the Nazareth Hospital

== Miscellaneous ==
- Oscar H. Banker (1895–1979), inventor of the automatic transmission for automobiles, the needleless inoculation gun, the primary controls of the first Sikorsky helicopter, and power steering
- Merguir Bardisbanian, 20th-century sound engineer
- Madame Bey (1881–1942), American boxing trainer
- Arthur H. Bulbulian (1900–1996), pioneer in the field of facial prosthetics
- Araksi Çetinyan, winner of the first beauty contest held in the Republic of Turkey
- Khachadour Paul Garabedian (1836–1881), American officer in the United States Navy, considered the only soldier of Armenian heritage to have served in combat during the American Civil War
- Garabed T. K. Giragossian, 20th-century developer of a perpetual motion device
- Mike Gulian (1900–1970), American football player
- Moses Housepian (1876–1952), physician and humanitarian aid worker
- Zaruhi Kavaljian (1877–1969), first female physician of Armenian descent in Turkey
- Aram Karamanoukian (1910–1996), Lieutenant General of the Syrian Army; member of the Syrian Parliament
- Mihran Kassabian (1870–1910), physician; one of the early investigators into the medical uses of X-rays, faculty member at the Medico-Chirurgical College of Philadelphia; vice president of both the American Roentgen Ray Society
- Varaztad Kazanjian (1879–1974), oral surgeon; founder of the modern practice of plastic surgery
- Hampar Kelikian (1899–1983), orthopedic surgeon
- Grigor Marzuantsi (1662–1730), book printer and engraver
- Mıgırdiç Mıgıryan (1882–1915), athlete; one of two athletes who represented the Ottoman Empire in the 1912 Olympic Games in Stockholm
- Vahram Papazyan (1892–1986), athlete; one of two athletes who represented the Ottoman Empire in the 1912 Olympic Games in Stockholm
- Louisette Texier (1913–2021), French resistant and racecar driver; one of the last remaining survivors of the Armenian genocide

== See also ==
- List of Turkish Armenians
- Armenians in the Ottoman Empire
- Ottoman Armenian population
- Armenian millet
- Armenian Sisters of the Immaculate Conception
