= Karakashian =

Karakashian or Karakashyan (Armenian: Քարաքաշյան, derived from Turkish "karakaş" [kara "black" + kaş "eyebrow"], meaning "one with a black/dark eyebrows") is an Armenian surname that may refer to:

- Narine Karakashian (born 1971), Armenian chess player
- Verkine Karakashian (1856–1933), Ottoman-Armenian actress and soprano
- Yeranuhi Karakashian (1848–1924), Ottoman-Armenian actress
- Nonna Karakashyan (born 1940), Armenian chess player
