= Hrant =

- Pronunciation: Armenian pronunciation: [həɹɑnt]
- Gender: Male

Origin
- Origin: Armenian

Other names
- Related names: Grant

Hrant, Hrand or Harant (Armenian: Հրանտ; pronounced [həɹɑnt]) is an Armenian given name. Among English-speakers it is often treated as a form of the name "Grant”. Notable people with the name include:

- Hrant Alianak (born 1950), Armenian Canadian actor and playwright
- Hrand Alyanak (1880–1938), Ottoman Armenian painter and author
- Hrant Ayvazyan (1969–2024), Armenian politician and parliamentarian
- Hrant Bagratyan (born 1958), Armenian politician and prime minister of Armenia
- Hrant Dink (1954–2007), Turkish Armenian journalist, intellectual and columnist
- Hrant Markarian (born 1958), Armenian politician and revolutionary
- Hrant Melkumyan (born 1989), Armenian chess grandmaster
- Hrant Matevosyan (1935–2002), Armenian ontemporary writer and screenwriter
- Hrant Maloyan (1896–1978), Armenian Syrian general
- Hrand Nazariantz (1886–1962), Ottoman Armenian poet and translator
- Hrant Shahinyan (1923–1996), Soviet Armenian gymnast
- Hrant Tokhatyan (born 1958), Armenian actor, comedian, announcer and producer
- Hrant Vardanyan (1949–2014), Armenian businessman and philanthropist
- Udi Hrant Kenkulian (1901–1978), Turkish Armenian classical musician

== See also ==
- Harants Anapat Monastery, monastery in Syunik, Armenia
