= 20 Hunchakian gallows =

- Part of the Armenian genocide
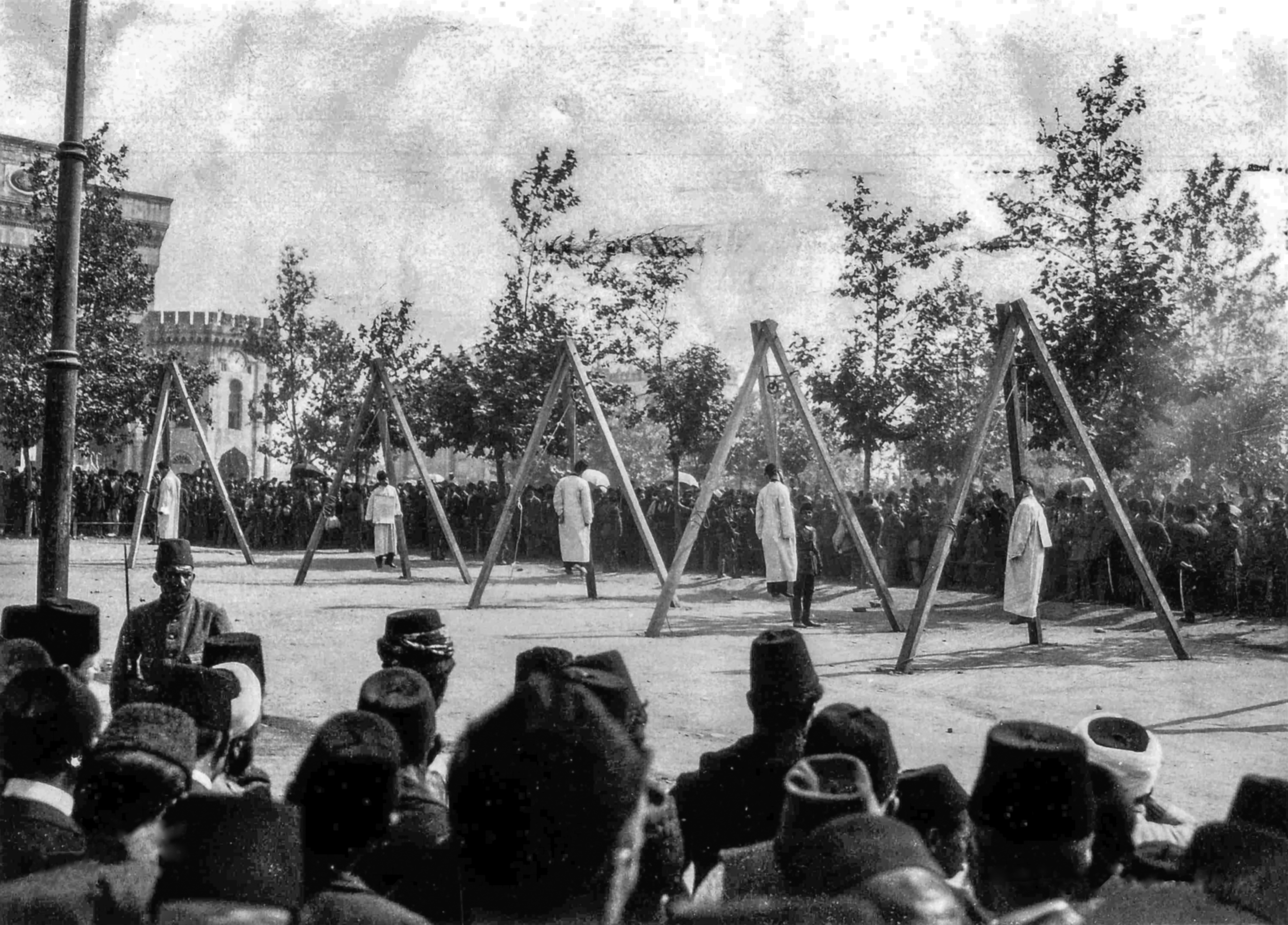
- In this picture, the gates of Istanbul University can be seen to the left.
- Location: Beyazıt Square, Constantinople, Ottoman Empire (present-day Istanbul, Turkey)
- Date: June 15, 1915
- Target: Social Democrat Hunchakian Party (Hunchakian) activists
- Attack type: Hanging
- Victims: 20
- Perpetrator: Ottoman government

The 20 Hunchakian gallows (Armenian: Քսան կախաղան, K'san kakhaghan, also "The 20 Martyrs" and "The 20s") were a group of Hunchakian activists who were hanged in the Sultan Beyazıt Square of Constantinople (now Istanbul) on June 15, 1915, during the Armenian genocide.

== History ==
The 7th General Convention of the Social Democrat Hunchakian Party which was held in Constanţa, Romania, in 1913, had a unique and great importance not only for the Hunchaks, but in the history of the Armenian people as a whole. During the convention, members stressed their concern of the Ittihad (Young Turk) government's blatant disregard of the Armenian lives who resided in Historic Armenia. The Hunchaks feared that this disregard would only escalate as time passed. The Hunchaks also stressed the importance of a United Independent Armenia which would be impossible under the dictatorial Young Turk government's rule of the Ottoman Empire.

Thus the convention adjourned with two main objectives:

I - As stated in its original program, the party was to move from licit to illicit activities, thus becoming once again a covert organization. II - To plan and assassinate the leaders of the Ittihad (Young Turk) party, the same leaders that carried out the Adana massacres of 1909, and thus the same leaders who at that moment were planning the annihilation of the Armenian people.

However, these secret objectives were passed on to the Ottomans by Artur Esayan (Arshavir Sahakian), a secret agent; consequently as soon as the delegates arrived in Constantinople, they were arrested. By the end of the year a total of one hundred and forty Hunchak leaders were arrested.

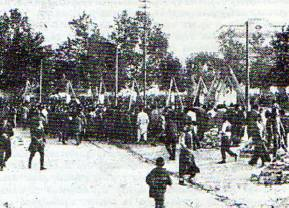
The 20 Gallows

After spending two years in terrible conditions in Turkish prisons, and undergoing lengthy mock trials, twenty prominent figures - Paramaz, Dr. Benne, Aram Achekbashian, Vanig and others were sentenced to death by hanging. A few weeks after the beginning of the Armenian genocide on June 15, 1915, all twenty men were hanged in the central square of Constantinople, known as Sultan Bayazid Square. Paramaz's last words before his hanging were, "You can only hang our bodies, but not our ideology. ...You will see tomorrow on the Eastern horizon a Socialist Armenia."

== List of the hanged Hunchakians ==
The names are written according to the writer and publisher Teotig. Two other prominent Hunchakian activists, Stepan Sapah-Gulian and Varaztahd, were condemned to death in absentia.

1. Paramaz – Փարամազ
2. Dr. Benne (Bedros Torosian) – Տքթ. Պէննէ (Պետրոս Թորոսեան), from Kharpert)
3. Aram Achekbashian – Արամ Աչըգպաշեան (Krikor Garabedian, from Arabkir)
4. Kegham Vanigian – Գեղամ Վանիկեան, (from Van), one of the editors of Gaidz youth journal
5. Mourad Zakarian – Մուրատ Զաքարեան, (from Mush)
6. Yervant Topouzian – Երուանդ Թօփուզեան
7. Hagop Basmajian – Յակոբ Պասմաճեան
8. Smpat Kelejian – Սմբատ Գըլըճեան
9. Roupen Garabedian – Ռուբէն Կարապետեան
10. Armenag Hampartsoumian – Արմենակ Համբարձումեան
11. Apraham Mouradian – Աբրահամ Մուրատեան
12. Hrand Yegavian – Հրանդ Եկաւեան
13. Karnig Krikor Boyajian – Գառնիկ Գրիգոր Պօյաճեան (from Shabin-Karahisar Şebinkarahisar)
14. Hovhannes D. Ghazarian – Յովհաննէս Տ. Ղազարեան
15. Mgrdich Yeretsian – Մկրտիչ Երէցեան
16. Yeremia Manoukian – Երեմիա Մանուկեան
17. Tovmas Tovmasian – Թովմաս Թովմասեան
18. Karekin Boghosian – Գարեգին Պօղոսեան
19. Minas Keshishian – Մինաս Քէշիշեան
20. Boghos Boghosian – Պողոս Պողոսեան
Gallery

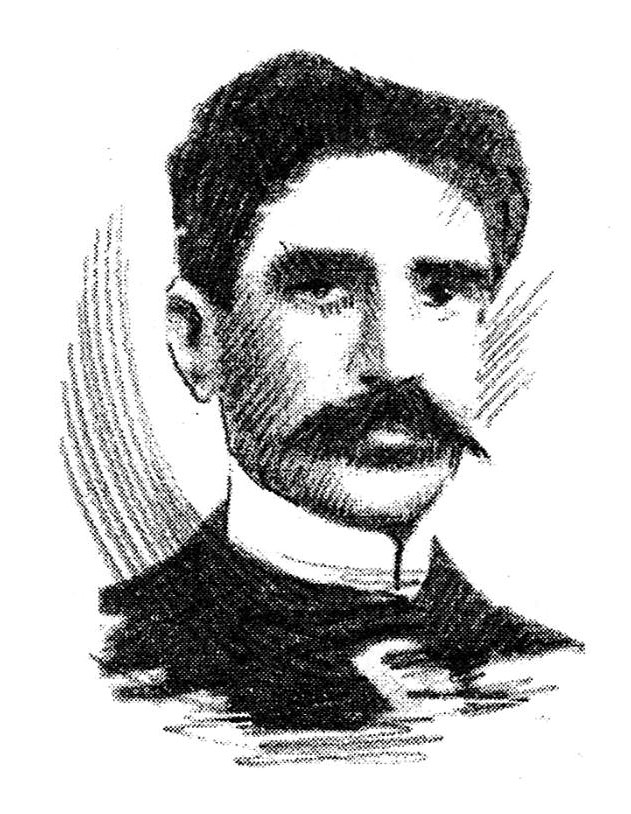
Paramaz

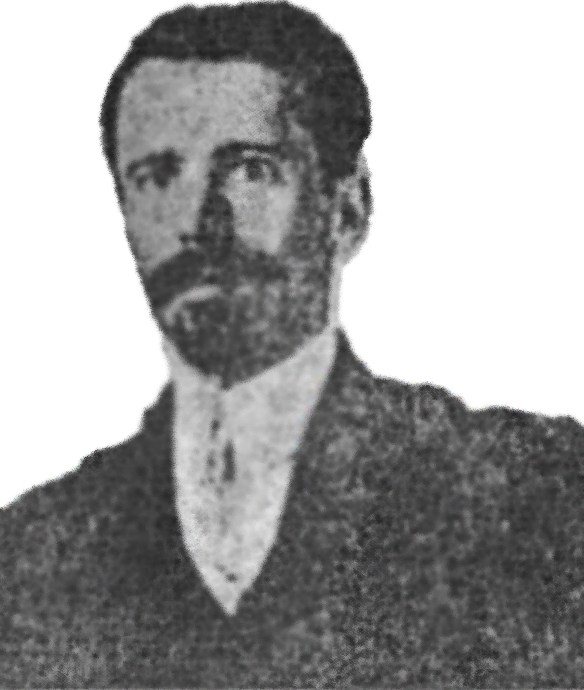
Dr Benne

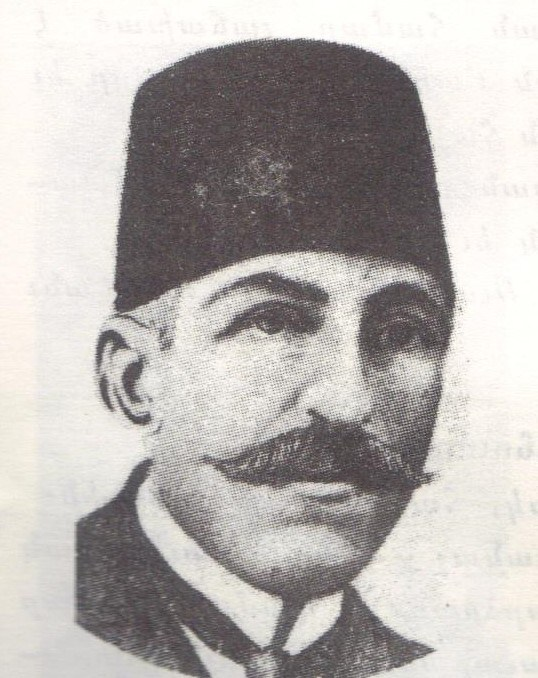
Aram Achekbashian

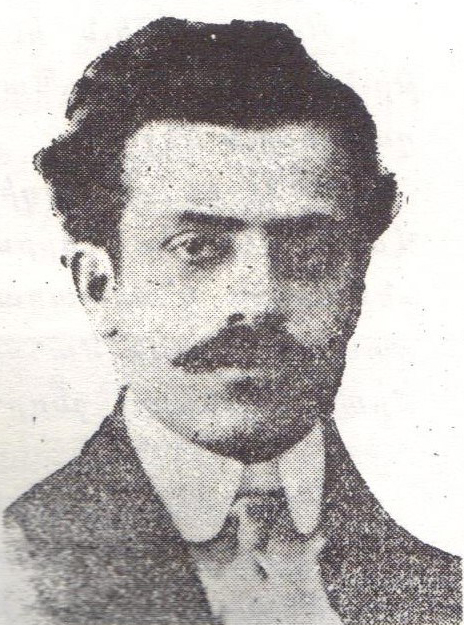
Kegham Vanigian

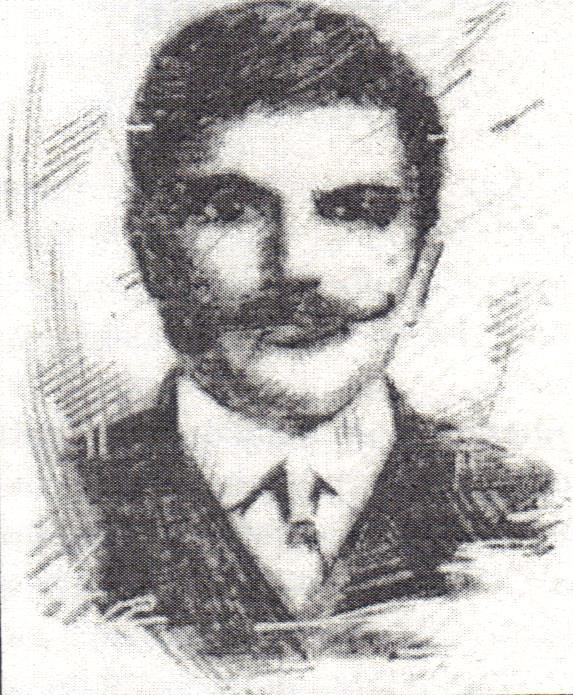
Mourad Zakarian

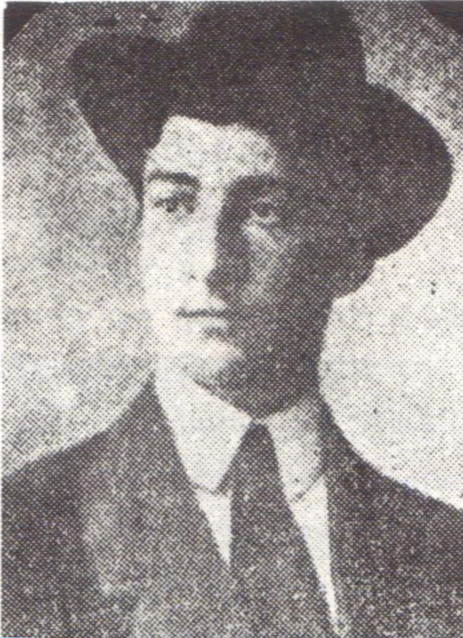
Yervant Topuzian

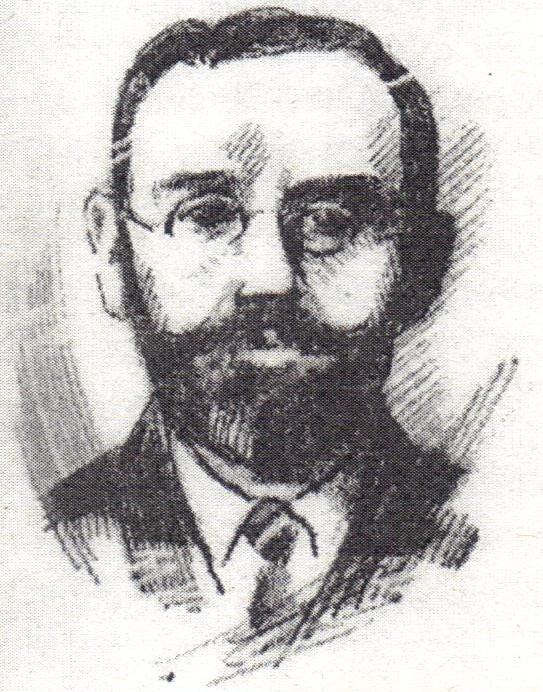
Hagop Basmajian

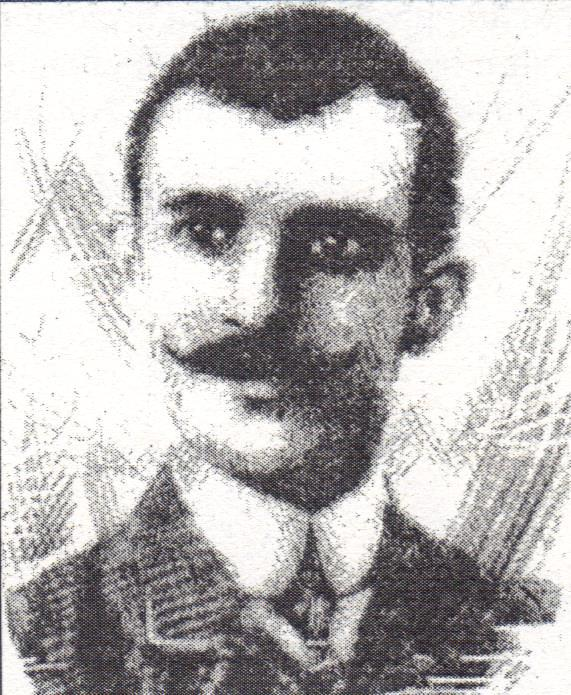
Smpat Kelejian

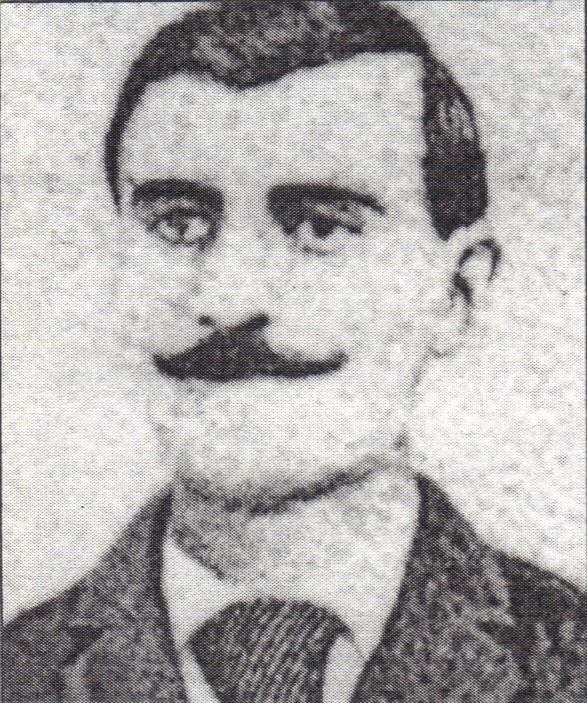
Roupen Garabedian

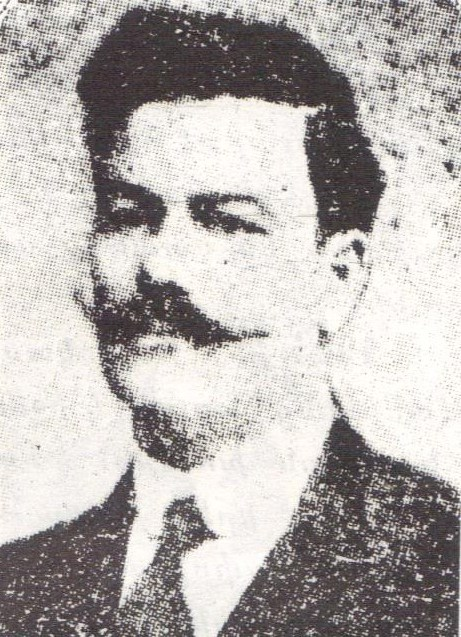
Armenag Hampartsoumian

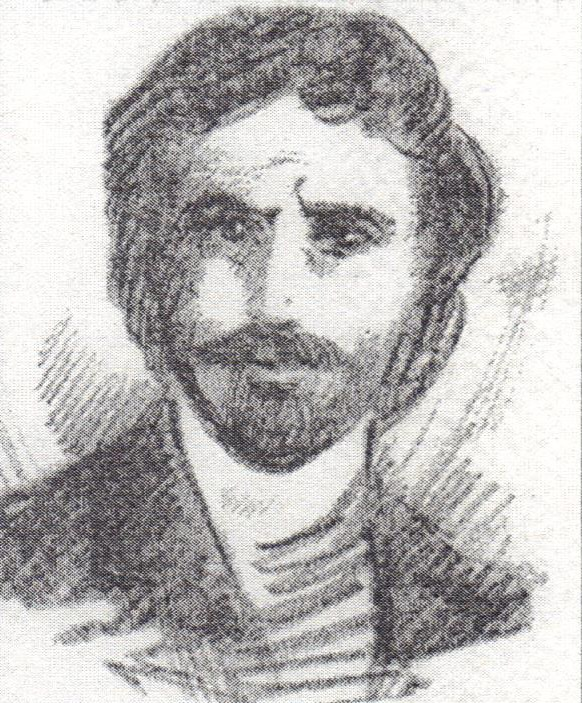
Apraham Mouradian

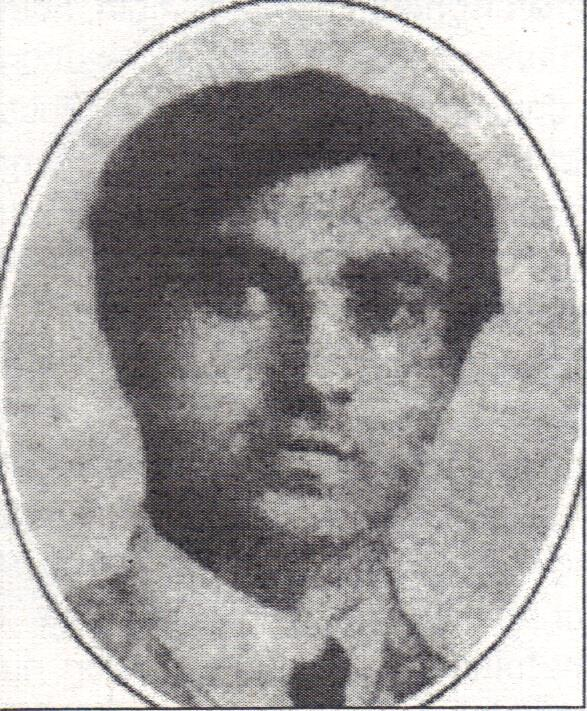
Hrand Yegavian

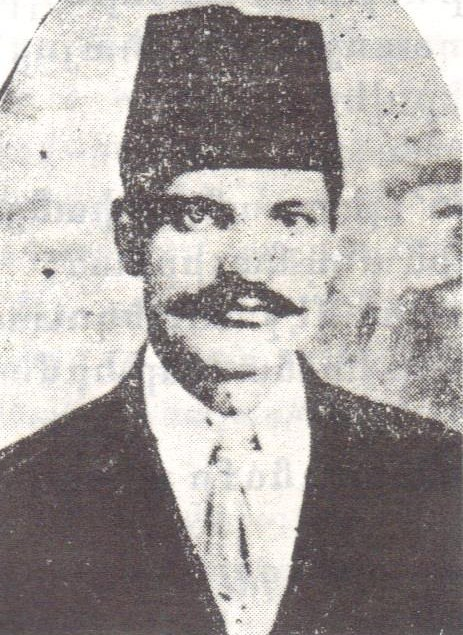
Karnig Krikor Boyajian

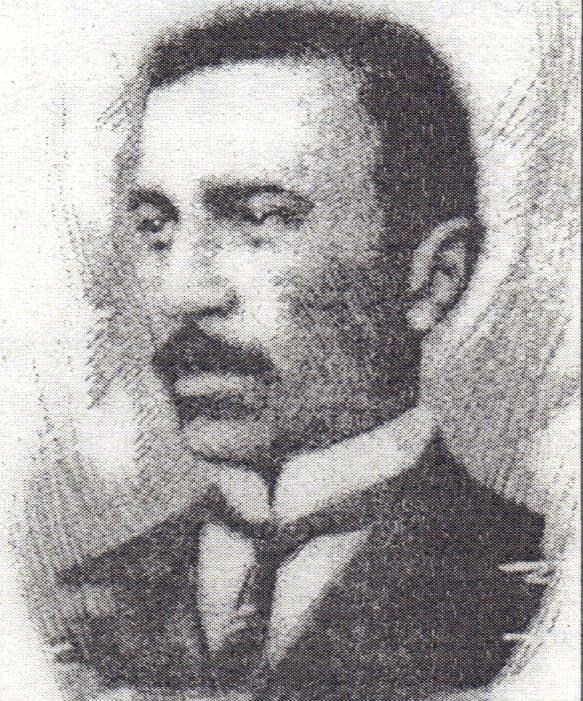
Hovhannes D. Ghazarian

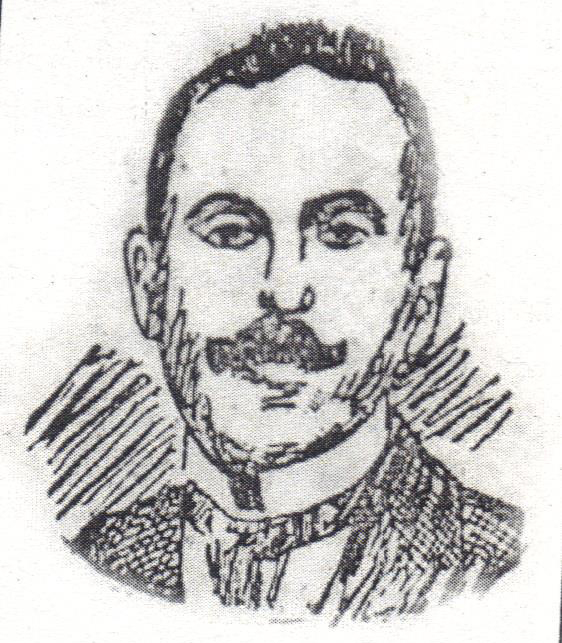
Mgrdich Yeretsian

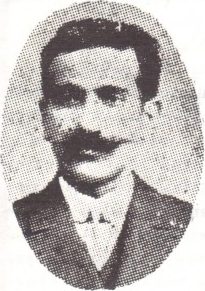
Yeremia Manoukian

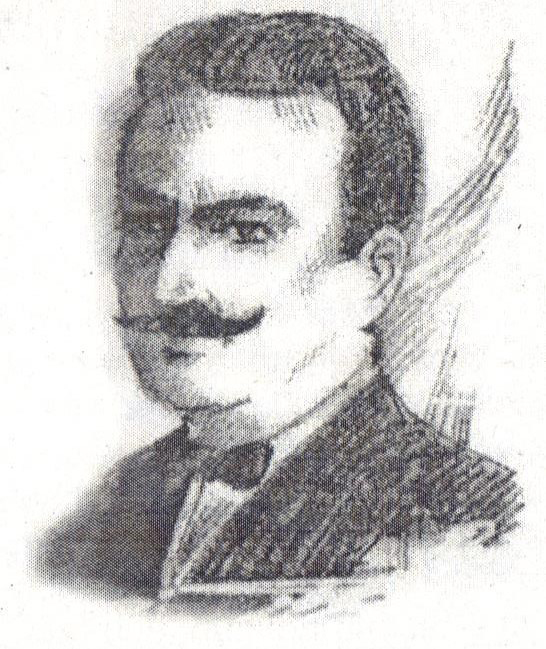
Tovmas Tovmasian

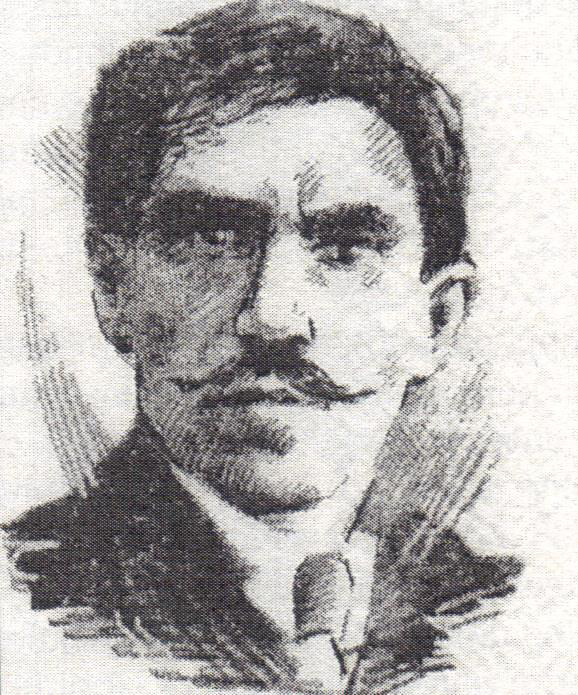
Karekin Boghosian

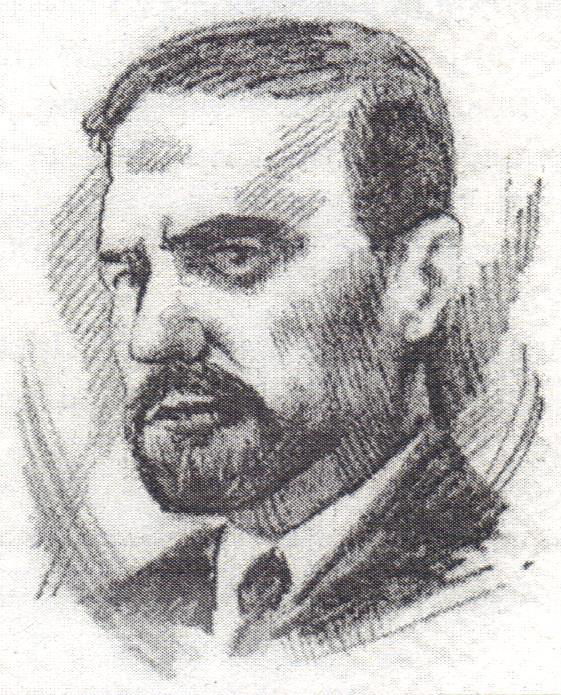
Minas Keshishian

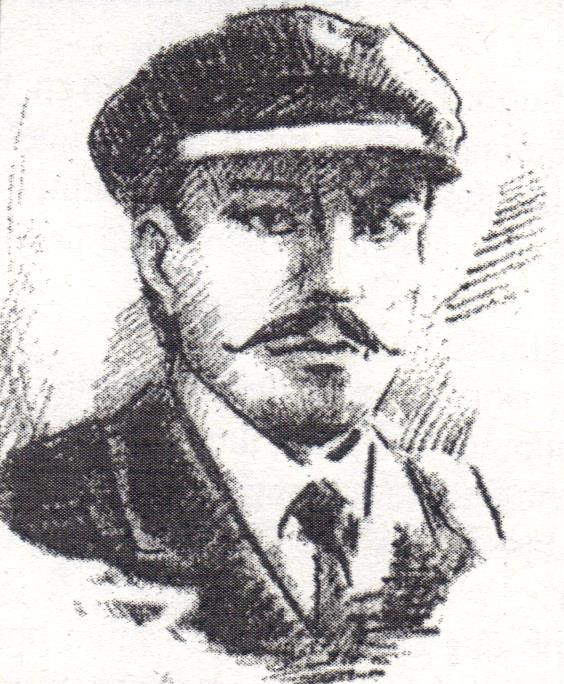
Boghos Boghosian

== Commemoration ==
Since their execution, the Twenty Martyrs have been a source of inspiration for thousands of young Armenians throughout the world, most especially to those who joined the Social Democrat Hunchakian Party and fought under its banner.

In 2001 the monument of Paramaz and his 19 Hunchakian comrades was opened in Meghri, Armenia.

On June 15, 2010, a panel discussion was held in Yerevan and the hanged activists were commemorated at the Tsitsernakaberd genocide memorial.

On June 13, 2013, a panel discussion was held in Istanbul with the attendance of human rights organizations and Turkish intellectuals.
