= Gedikpaşa Tiyatrosu =

The Gedikpaşa Tiyatrosu (Gedikpaşa Theatre), also known as the Ottoman Theater and Vartovian Theatre, was an Ottoman theatre established in Istanbul in 1866 and active until 1884. It was the first theatre in the Ottoman Turkey where plays were performed by Turkish actors, whereas previous theatres in the Ottoman Empire had only employed Western travelling theatre troupes or non-Muslim Ottoman people such as Armenians.

== History ==
The building was erected in 1859. In 1866, it was inaugurated for use as a theatre. It was one of the first modern theatres in Istanbul. Güllü Agop of the Oriental Theater became the director of the Gedikpaşa in 1867. He founded a theater company called Ottoman Theatre, which performed at the Gedikpaşa; the name of the building and the name of the theater company performing there therefore became synonyms.

When the Naum Theatre was destroyed in 1870, the Gedikpaşa Theatre became the main theater stage in Istanbul. Modern theater in the Ottoman Empire was long dominated by first foreign actors, and then from the 1850s by Ottoman actors from the religious minorities, primarily Christian Armenians. In Gedikpaşa, Muslim Turkish actors was first introduced to perform onstage; there were all men and female roles where still performed by Armenian actresses, since no Muslim Turkish woman performed onstage until the 1919-1920 season.

It was described:

"With its regular Turkish performances, location, and broader audience, Gedikpaşa Theatre was one of the most important theatres established during the Tanzimat period. The first muslim-Turkish actors performed in Gedikpaşa Theatre and the famous writers of the period were composing plays for the theatre. Significantly, the theatre was not located in the Pera district, historically known as a neighbourhood in which mostly foreigners resided; instead, it was midway between Çarşıkapı and Beyazıt towards the sea. The Beyazıt area was a centre mostly occupied by local Turks’ residences and businesses (And 1972, 214).41 This location was quite significant because it shows the targeted main audience was not only non-Muslim subjects and foreigners but also Muslim Turkish subjects. This intended audience demonstrates that the theatres not only attracted minority groups, but that Western style of arts became so popular that theatres were established in even highly populated Muslim neighbourhoods."

Güllü Agop left the theater in 1880. The theatre was destroyed in 1884. After the closure of the Gedikpaşa, the modern theater in Istanbul was dominated by the Ottoman Theatre Company (1884-1908), composed by several actors from the Gedikpaşa Tiyatrosu, until the foundation of the Darülbedayi in 1914 (Istanbul City Theatres known as 1934).
