= Kegham =

Kegham is an Armenian given name. Notable people with the name include:

- Kégham Atmadjian (1910–1940), French-Armenian poet and editor
- Kegham Djeghalian (1915–1981), Armenian-Palestinian photographer
- Kegham Kavafyan (1888–1959), Ottoman Armenian architect
- Kegham Parseghian (1883–1915), Armenian writer, teacher, editor, and journalist
- Kegham Vanigian (1889–1915), Armenian political activist and newspaper editor
- Msho Kegham (1865–1918), Armenian writer and politician
