= Koharik Şirinyan =

Koharik Şirinian (1860 – ?) (Armenian: Գոհարիկ Շիրինյան), also known as Koharik Shirinian (in English) or Koharik Schirinian (in German), was an Ottoman-Armenian actress and soprano.

== Career ==
Koharik Şirinian was born in Kumkapı quarter of Istanbul, Ottoman Empire, in 1860.

Şirinyan stepped onto the stage in 1869. In 1874, she played a girl's role in the theatre of Güllü Agop (1840–1902). Her voice type was close to tenor. Between 1878 and 1880, she played singing male roles in operettas on the stage. In 1879, Şirinyan appeared with Bayzur Fasulyeciyan and Tahuki Hiranuş Satenik on stage in Bursa, in the beginning in a garden theatre called "Melekzade".. As theatre was sanctioned in Istanbul by Ottoman sultan Abdul Hamid II (reigned 1876–1909), Governor of Bursa Ahmed Vefik Pasha promoted it. In 1882, she joined the Ottoman-Armenian Serovpe Bengliyan Operetta Group as soprano. Şirinyan was one of the most important members of the Ottoman-Armenian Serovpe Bengliyan Operetta Group thanks to her superior ability.

Şirinyan performed in the operatta roles of the Fiorella in Jacques Offenbach's Les brigands, Charles Lecocq's Giroflé-Girofla and Fatma in Tigran Chukhajian's Leblebici hor-hor agha as well as the male role of Prince Miniapur in Mongol te Great. She took roles in almost all tragedies in the repertory of Bengliyan Operette Group. After the Serovpe Bengliyan Group was disbanded, Şirinyan joined the Mardiros Minakyan Group in 1887. Şirinyan played in dramatic roles in Jacques Laurent's Frou-Frou and Georges Ohnet's Le Maître de forges. In the early 1900s, she was for a while with the Ottoman Comedy Group of Reşat Rıdvan Bey.
