= Yeranuhi Karakashian =

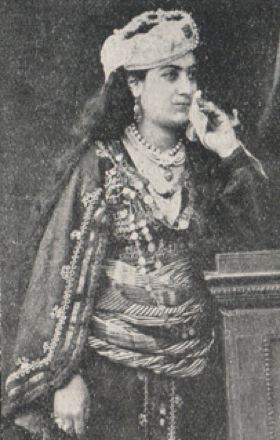
Yeranuhi Karakashian

Yeranuhi Karakashian (Armenian: Երանուհի Գարագաշյան; 1848 in Uskudar, Ottoman Empire - 1924 in Tiflis, Georgia) was an ethnic Armenian actress.

== Biography ==
Yeranuhi Karakashian was born in 1848 in Üsküdar, a district of Constantinople (Istanbul) that is situated on the Asiatic side of the Bosphorus. She was the older sister of actress and soprano Verkine Karakashian (1856 - 1933). She attended the local elementary school. Her first theatrical performance was in 1864 at the Oriental Theater (Şark Tiyatrosu) starring in the Drtad the Great play. She then was accepted into Gullu Agop's theatrical group. Soon thereafter, she became the leading actress for almost all woman roles.

Her fame had her travel to the Caucasus, where she starred in plays such as Gabriel Sundukian's Pepo and The Count of Monte Cristo's Mercedes. She married Alexander Argoutiantz and settled in Tiflis where she died in 1924.
