= Papazyan =

Papazyan (in Armenian Փափազյան) (in Western Armenian Papazian, Փափազեան) is a surname of Armenian origin.

Notable people with the surname include:

== Papazyan ==
- Arutyun Papazyan (born 1954), Armenian pianist
- Vahram Papazyan (athlete) (1892–1986), one of two athletes who represented Turkey in the 1912 Summer Olympics

== Papazian ==
- Aghavni Papazian (floruit 1879), Ottoman Armenian actress
- Arousyak Papazian (1841–1907), Ottoman Armenian actress
- Charlie Papazian, American nuclear engineer and homebrewer
- Haig Papazian, Lebanese Armenian violinist, member of the Lebanese alternative rock band Mashrou' Leila
- Marty Papazian, American actor
- Mary Papazian, American administrator and professor in English
- Vahan Papazian (1876–1973), Armenian political activist
- Vahram Papazian (1886–1968), Soviet Armenian actor
- Vrtanes Papazian (1866–1920), Armenian writer, historian, activist, translator, literary critic and editor
