= Arevelian Tatron =

Arevelian Tatron (Eastern Theater), also known as the Şark Tiyatrosu or Oriental Theater, was a theater company established in Istanbul, the Ottoman Empire, in 1859. It played an important pioneering role in the history of modern theater in Turkey, as the first professional theater company in the Ottoman Empire, and the stage of the first pioneer generation of indigenous actors in the Ottoman Empire.

== History ==
The Arevelian Tatron was founded by Arakel Altunduryan. He was one of the Armenian pioneer actors who had been educated in acting in Venice in Italy, and who returned with the ambition to practice the art form of modern theater in the Ottoman Empire, where it was only practiced by foreign actors in the Naum Theatre. The theater was given Imperial privilege by the Sultan. It was founded during the tanzimat era, when the Ottoman society was going through a period of reform and modernization, which made authorities benevolent toward such requests.

The company was composed by Christian Armenian, who formed the pioneer generation of the first indigenous Ottoman actors: Acemyan, S., Agavni Papazyan, Bedros Magakyan, Beşiktaşlıyan, David Triyans, Hovannes Acemyan, Kalus Dernogasyan, Licezi, Osep Çeraz, Romanos Sedefçiyan, Serope Benliyan, Mardiros Mmakyan, Terzyanı T; the most famous perhaps being Agop Vartovyan, later known as Güllü Agop, who joined the company in 1862. The company also included the first professional female actors: Arusyak Papazyan, Ağavni Papazyan and Mariam Dzağıkyan.

The Arevelian Tatron's dominant position was succeeded by the Gedikpaşa Tiyatrosu, founded in 1866 by actors from the Arevelian Tatron.
