= Arakel Sivaslian =

Ottoman Armenian academic

Arakel Garabed Sivaslian
- Առաքել Կարապետ Սիվասլեան
- Born: 22 October 1858; Muncusun, Ottoman Empire (present day Güneşli, Turkey)
- Died: 1915 (aged 56–57)
- Occupations: Teacher, professor

Arakel Garabed Sivaslian (Armenian: Առաքել Կարապետ Սիվասլեան; 22 October 1858 – 1915) was an Ottoman Armenian known for being the first Ottoman subject to receive a degree in astronomy and mathematics. He was later killed during the Armenian genocide for refusing to abandon his Christian faith.

== Biography ==
Sivaslian was born on 22 October 1858 in the village of Muncusun, Kayseri province, to an Armenian family. He attended an American missionary school in Merzifon where he excelled in mathematics, algebra and geometry. He then began teaching at this same school after his graduation and later moved to teaching at the Anatolian College in Merzifon 1886, founded by the same missionaries. Due to a connection between the Anatolian College and the Carleton College in Minnesota, he moved to America in 1890 to further his studies.

While in America, Sivaslian focused on sunspots and the orbit of comets, eventually publishing his thesis “Determination of the Complete Orbit of Holmes' Comet” which earned him his doctorate in 1893. This made Sivaslian the first Ottoman subject astronomer to hold a doctorate as well as the recipient of the first Ph.D. ever granted by Carelton. Sivaslian then went back to Anatolian College, this time to teach under the title of professor, until he was sent back to the United States again for further research and travel. Through his time there he raised enough money to establish an observatory for Anatolian College as well as a large telescope which he had sent back to Merzifon. He returned to Merzifon in 1912.

Sivaslian's three children were sent to the United States; however, Sivaslian himself and his wife stayed, despite their children's petitions. Sivaslian was later deported from Merzifon with his wife and two daughters, after refusing to convert to Islam, accompanying many Armenians on the death marches of the Armenian genocide. Sivaslian and the other men were shot with their hands tied between their backs while the women including Sivaslian's wife and daughters were never heard from again.
