= Arousyak Papazian =

Ottoman Armenian actress (1841–1907)

- Արուսեակ Փափազեան
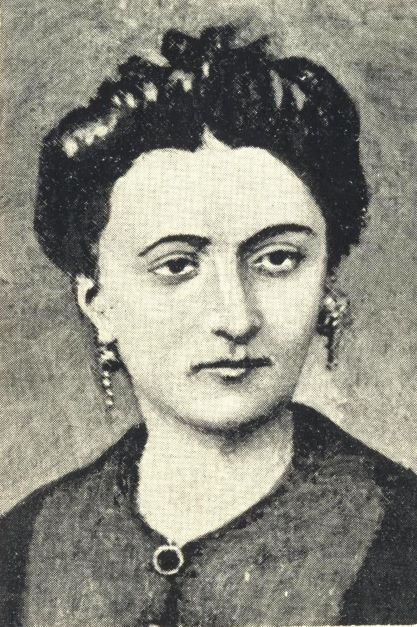
- Born: 1841; Constantinople, Ottoman Empire
- Died: 1907 (aged 65–66); Constantinople, Ottoman Empire
- Occupations: Actress, teacher

Arousyak Papazian (Armenian: Արուսեակ Փափազեան, 1841–1907) was an Ottoman Armenian actress. She is counted as the first professional female actor in the Ottoman Empire and thereby the Middle East.

== Life ==
Arousyak Papazian was born in Constantinople, Ottoman Empire (now Istanbul, Turkey), in 1841. Before becoming an actress, she worked as a teacher. In the 1850s, the modern theatre was founded in the Ottoman Empire by an Armenian theatre company, and Papazian was reportedly the first female actor to perform onstage, making her debut in 1857 as a member in the Hekimian theatre company, where she was engaged from 1857 to 1859. From 1861, she was engaged at the Arevelian Tatron (Oriental Theater) and also toured with the company, such as to İzmir in 1867.

As Muslims did not consider acting a suitable profession, the first actors in the Ottoman Empire were Christian Armenians, and the stigma of the profession was especially the case for females, the actresses received a higher salary than their male colleagues, and they could also continue their careers undisturbed after the Armenian theatre monopoly was abolished in the Ottoman Empire in 1879. After this point, male Armenian actors found competition from Muslim Turkish male actors, while no Muslim Turkish female actor ever performed on stage before Afife Jale during the theater season of 1919–20.

Arousyak Papazian became the first leading lady and female star of the Ottoman theatre and received considerable praise. She and her colleague Aghavni Papazian are mentioned by the historian Mikael Nalbandian as two pioneers in defying prejudices by performing on stage in the Muslim Middle East. As such, they became publicly visible women in the Muslim Ottoman Empire in a period during a period of sex segregation, when the female members of the audience had to watch their plays from behind screens.

Arousyak Papazian retired after her marriage, because of her spouse was opposed to her theatrical career. She died in Constantinople in 1907.

== See also ==
- Papazyan
