= Aghavni Papazian =

Aghavni Papazian (fl. 1879), was an Ottoman Armenian actress. She is counted as one of the first professional female actors in the Ottoman Empire and thereby the Middle East.

In the 1850s, the modern theatre was founded in the Ottoman Empire by an Armenian theatre company, Arevelian Tatron. As Muslims did not consider acting a suitable profession, the first actors in the Ottoman Empire was Christian Armenians, and the stigma of the profession was especially the case for females, the actresses received a higher salary than their male colleagues, and they could also continue their careers undisturbed after the Armenian theater monopoly was abolished in the Ottoman Empire in 1879. After this point, male Armenian actors found competition from Muslim Turkish male actors, while no Muslim Turkish female actor ever performed on stage before the 1919-1920 season.

She and her college Arousyak Papazian are mentioned by the historian Mikael Nalbandian as two pioneers in defying prejudices by performing on stage. As such, they became publicly visible women in the Muslim Ottoman Empire in a period when the female members of the audience had to watch their plays behind screens.

Aghavni Papazian was also historical as the first actress to have performed in Iran, when she appeared on stage in Tabriz. This was, however, before a Christian Armenian audience: the Muslim audience in Tabriz and Iran did not see the performance of an actress until 1888, and in the case of Teheran, not until the performance of Madame Golofin and Madame Babian in 1897.

== See also ==
- Papazyan
