= Verkine Karakashian =

Ottoman-Armenian actress and soprano

- Վերգինե Գարագաշյան
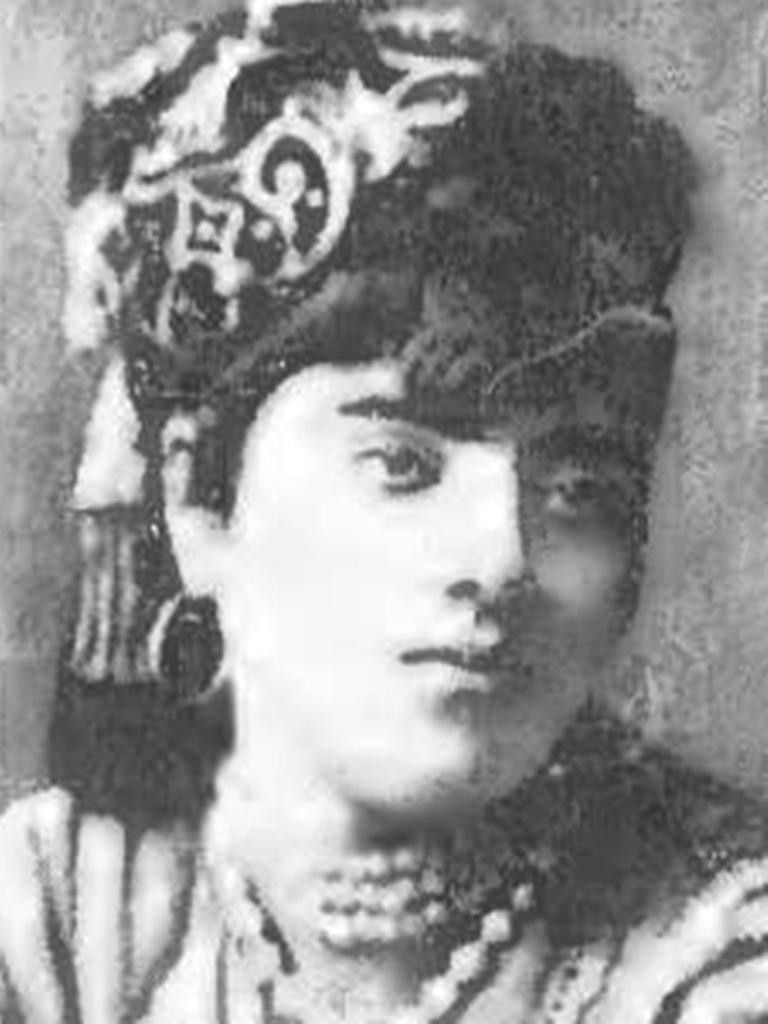
- Born: September 4, 1856
- Died: August 19, 1933 (aged 76)
- Citizenship: Ottoman Empire; Greece
- Occupation: Opera singer

Verkine Karakashian (Armenian: Վերգինե Գարագաշյան, Turkish: Verkine Karakaşyan, September 4, 1856 - August 19, 1933) was an Ottoman-Armenian actress and soprano.

Verkine Karakashian was born in Constantinople, today Istanbul, in 1856. She was the younger sister of actress Yeranuhi Karakashian. She debuted on the stage at Aziziye Theater in Üsküdar, Istanbul, in 1869, joining the theater company of Güllü Agop. She later performed as soprano at the operetta company of Serovpe Benliyan. Following her marriage in 1914, she retired from the stage and lived in Symirna, today İzmir. She died in Athens, Greece, in 1933.

Verkine Karakashian's impactful performances, which included both lyrical and comedic roles, are considered to have played a significant role in inspiring young women to participate in public performances and challenge traditional norms.
