= Vahram Manavyan =

Ottoman and Egyptian painter of Armenian descent

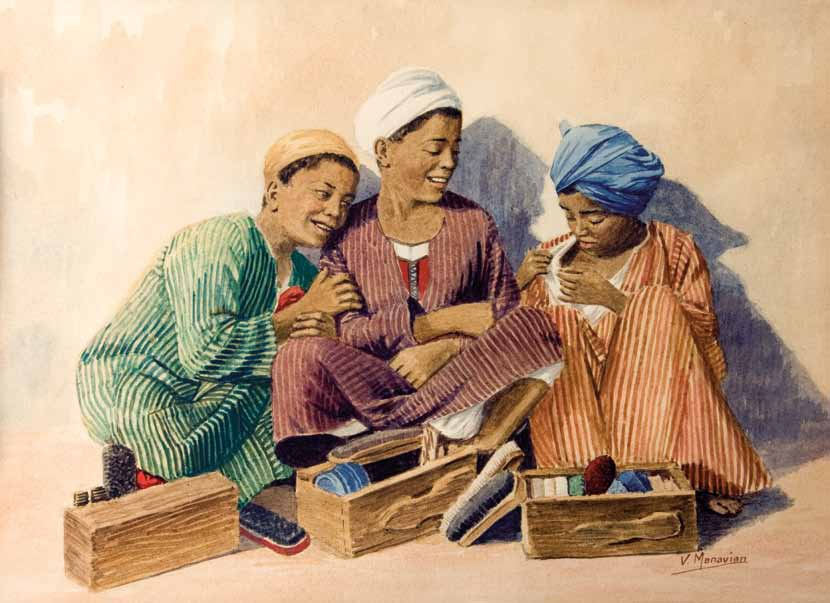
Little Shoe Polishers

Vahram Manavian (Born Constantinople, Ottoman Turkey 1880 – died Cairo, Egypt 1952) was an Ottoman and Egyptian painter of Armenian descent.

== Life ==
Vahram Manavian was born in Istanbul, one of six children of the writer Dikran Manavian. He began taking art lessons from the painter Simon Agopyan and later graduated the academy of Fine Arts. He went to Paris, France where he took lessons at the Académie Julian. He emigrated with his family to Egypt in 1911 and settled in Alexandria. He became an art teacher and later set up a business for financial reasons, as well as working as a photographer. Meanwhile, he continued to paint. He moved to Cairo and in 1934 opened a joint exhibition with the painter Yervant Demirciyan. His second exhibition was held at the Museum of Fine Arts in 1951. He died in Cairo. His paintings are still being exhibited throughout the world.

== Publication ==
- Egyptian Humour, 1916 - Caricatures and cartoons
