= Berç Türker Keresteciyan =

Turkish politician

Berç Türker
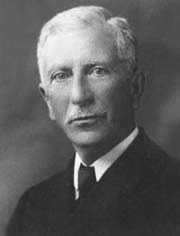
- Born: 1870; Istanbul, Ottoman Empire.
- Died: 1949 (aged 78–79); Istanbul, Turkey
- Other name: Berç Keresteciyan Türker
- Education: Galatasaray High School, Robert College
- Occupations: Bank executive and politician
- Known for: Hyperpolyglot
- Parent(s): Sazik and Mgrdich Kerestejian

Berç Türker (also known as Berç Türker Keresteci or Berç Keresteciyan Türker; or Berj Kerestejian, Armenian: Պերճ Քերեստեջյան) (1870–1949) was an Ottoman-Turkish bank executive and politician of ethnic Armenian origin.

== Early life ==
Türker was born in 1870 in Constantinople, the capital of the Ottoman Empire, into an Armenian family. His father Mgrdich Kerestejian, manager of the customs office of Constantinople, died when he was five years old. His unmarried uncle Bedros Keresteciyan, manager at the External Communications Office of the Sublime Porte up to 1890 and manager of the Translation Office of the Finance Ministry until his death in 1909, a hyperpolyglot in 10 languages and author of the etymological dictionary of the Turkish language, raised him and greatly influenced his formation. A specialist in financial and economic affairs, Bedros Keresteciyan taught his nephew in these fields. Berç first attended the prestigious Galatasaray High School, a public school which provided education in the French language, later transferring to Robert College, an American quasi-missionary private school.

== Professional career ==
After his education at Robert College, Berç Keresteciyan was employed by the Finance Ministry, where he served for two years. Then, his uncle appointed him to the Ottoman Bank, an institution with half European (English and French) and half Ottoman in character and cosmopolitan personnel.

After the raid of August 26, 1896 carried out by the Armenian Revolutionary Federation, Berç Keresteciyan was sent by his European supervisors as precaution to Cairo, Egypt as branch manager along with some other non-Muslim middle level officials. He worked also in the İzmir branch.

As the Turkish Red Crescent (Ottoman Turkish: Osmanlı Hilal-i Ahmer Cemiyeti) was re-established for the third and last time in 1911, Berç Keresteciyan was a co-founder, became the only non-Muslim member of the executive committee and later vice chairman of the humanitarian institution.

With the outbreak of World War I and the participation of the Ottoman Empire in the war, the Bank's officials of British and French nationality fell in the position of citizens of hostile countries. The Ottomans threatened the Bank with confiscation, and the general manager and his deputy had to leave their posts and the country until the end of the war. The administration was taken over by non-Muslim Ottomans. Berç Keresteciyan was among them. He was deputy general manager and later became general manager of the Bank.

He served for a period as a Deputy at the Chamber of Deputies, the lower house of the Ottoman Parliament.

== Turkish War of Independence ==
An anecdote is being told about his contribution to save the life of Mustafa Kemal Atatürk, as he informed Atatürk's lawyer about a British plot to sink his ship SS Bandırma in the Black Sea, on which Atatürk left Constantinople (today-Istanbul) in 1919 to initiate the Turkish War of Independence. He was awarded the white stripe Medal of Independence after the war.

In 1923, Berç Keresteciyan sent a telegram to Atatürk in his capacity as the honorary president of the Turco-Armenian Friendship Association and a member of the secular council of the Armenian Patriarchate, confirming the loyalty and the support of his community to the political authority of the government in Ankara.

Following the surname reform on June 21, 1934, Atatürk gave Berç Keresteciyan the family name Türker (Turkish for Turk man) for his patriotism.

== Political career ==
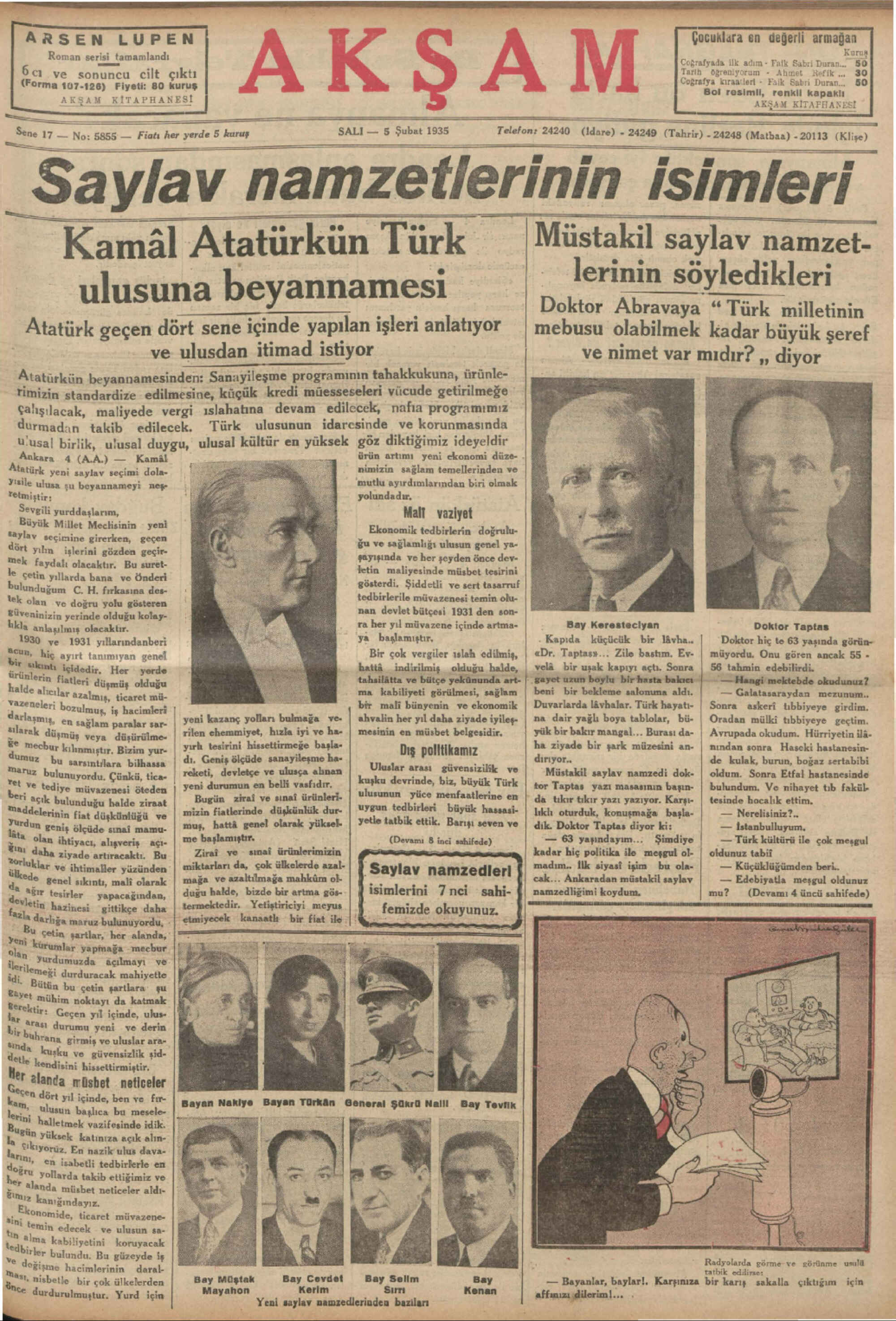
Premières élections des minorités de Turquie - Akşam, 1935 (Atatürk, Berç Keresteciyan et Nikola Taptas)

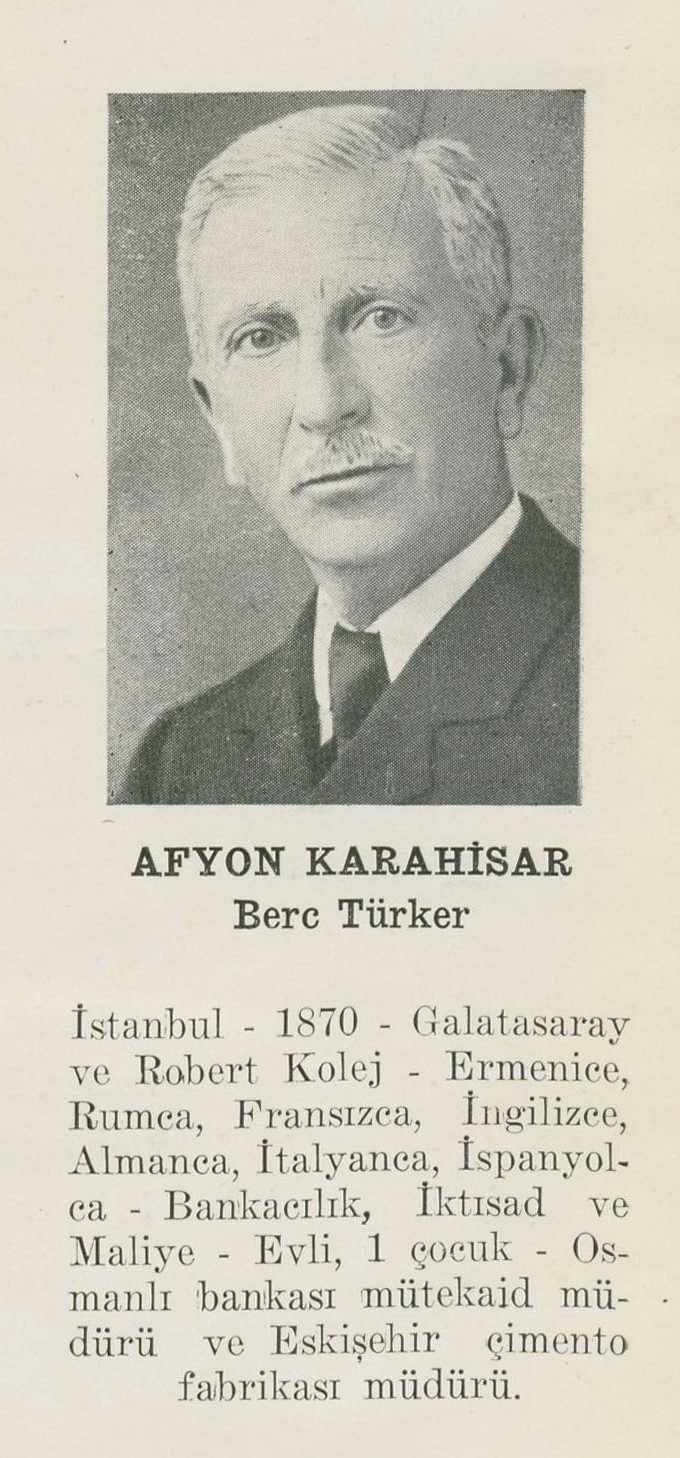
Berç Keresteciyan Türker - élu de la minorité arménienne, 1935

Encouraged and supported by Atatürk, he run as an independent candidate for a deputy seat from Afyonkarahisar at the 1935 general elections and became a member of the Turkish Grand National Assembly on March 7, 1935 as the first Armenian and one of the four non-Muslims in total. The same day, he also became a member of the economic commission of the parliament thanks to his expertise. He repeated his membership of the parliament twice more after the general elections in 1939 and 1943.

During his political career in the parliament, Berç Türker Keresteciyan made significant contributions to issues of general political, economic, social and international developments.

After his retirement in 1947, he lived at Büyükada, Istanbul. Berç Türker Keresteciyan died in Istanbul, on 27 July 1949, and interred on 29 July in the same city.
