= Haig Gudenian =

Haig Gudenian Hayk Kyutenyan
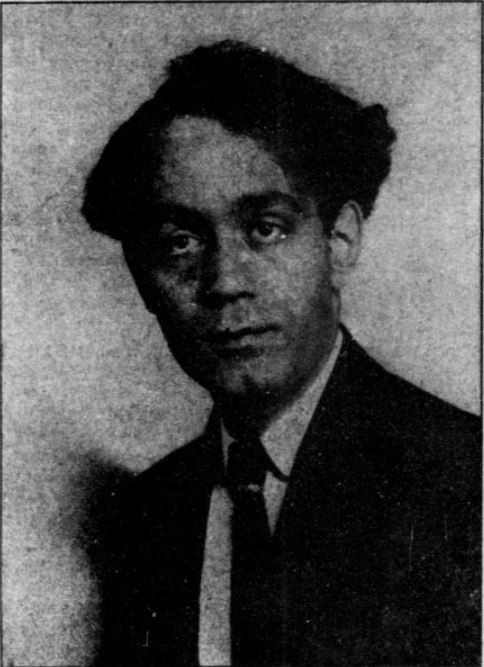
- Haig Gudenian, 1919

Background information
- Also known as: Koyun Kafa (Literary pseudonym, "Ram's Head" in Turkish)
- Born: 19 May 1885; Kayseri, Ottoman Empire
- Origin: Armenian
- Died: May 12, 1972 (aged 86) Crescent Beach, Florida
- Occupations: Violinist, Composer
- Instrument: Violin
- Years active: 1904–1959

Hayk Kyutenyan (Armenian: Հայկ Կիւտէնեան), anglicized as Haig Gudenian (19 May 1885 – 12 May 1972), was an Armenian American violinist, composer, and author. He left his home city of Constantinople in 1904 and went to western Europe where he studied music and violin under Vítězslav Novák, Otakar Sevcik, César Thomson, and Mathieu Crickboom. Playing a rare 18th-century Spanish violin in his concert performances, he was known for his virtuoso skill as a violinist, and for introducing Middle Eastern music, especially that of Anatolia and the Caucasus, to European and American audiences; almost all of his numerous compositions were inspired by the diverse cultural heritage of the region. Among his compositions are works such as "The Armenian Shepherd", "Armenian Love Song", and "The Arabian Boy", that depict the lives and ideals of the Armenian people. Violinists Jascha Heifetz and Max Rosen, as well as pianist Percy Grainger, included various works of his in their repertoires.

== Early years ==
Born in the city of Kayseri (Caesarea) in the Ottoman Empire, Gudenian attended the Turkish University of Constantinople, then moved to Brussels in 1904, where he studied violin under César Thomson and Mathieu Crickboom. In Prague, he studied violin under Otakar Sevcik and composition with Vítězslav Novák. After finishing his studies, he traveled for several years in Czechoslovakia, Turkey, the Caucasus, Persia, and Egypt, collecting and assimilating the traditional music of folk songs and dances in those countries, followed by two years in the Balkans. He gave recitals in the principal cities and towns of Bulgaria and Romania, where he was under royal patronage; accompanied by Romanian violinist George Enescu, he performed for Queen Elisabeth (Carmen Sylva) in her palace at Bucharest. He played in Budapest, Munich, Geneva, Marseilles, Paris and other major cities in Continental Europe, coming from France to New York in January 1918 during World War I. Sent as a messenger under the authorization of the French minister, he devoted much time to Red Cross and Armenian relief work in the United States. Soon after his arrival in the United States, he secretly married Olive Peabody in St. Charles, Missouri; they had met at the Odeon Theatre in St. Louis when Gudenian performed in a benefit appearance on behalf of the Syrian-Armenian Relief Fund.

Their marriage was very brief, as Gudenian married the pianist Katherine Lowe (1901–1997) of East Lansing, Michigan the same year. He performed in New York City, Washington, D.C, and Chicago, and appeared as a soloist In the St. Louis and Philadelphia symphony orchestras.

== Career ==
Gudenian served for two years (1920–1922) on the faculty of the Cincinnati Conservatory of Music as teacher of Violin, Ensemble and Repertoire, and gave lessons in violin-playing at Alice Becker-Miller School of Music in Dayton, Ohio. He premiered three of his compositions in a promenade concert on 27 August 1925 at Queen's Hall, London: "The Shepherd", "Candy Seller", and "Pastorale", all orchestrated by Henry Wood. His musical ideas were the subject of much discussion at the time in London, according to the English musicologist Ernest Newlandsmith, who mentioned them in a lecture he delivered at the University of Oxford on 21 May 1931.

He and his wife Katherine moved frequently around the midwestern United States in the years after World War I, living in Lansing, Michigan; St. Louis, Missouri; Cincinnati and Dayton, Ohio; and Connersville, Indiana.

== Musical style ==
To enable his playing in Eastern musical modes, Gudenian employed an alternative tuning of his violin, which allowed the frequent use of open strings (no strings fretted). Rather than the G, D, A, E tuning used in the West, Guden used E, B, F-sharp, B (two perfect fifths and a perfect fourth). The fourth interval between the two upper strings rendered a difference to the double stoppings unfamiliar in the West. The English musicologist, music critic, and violinist Marion M. Scott wrote of Gudenian's music:

But once admit an altered tuning and all sorts of new vistas open up. The strangely delicate, philosophical and original compositions of Haig Gudenian have brought the very essence of Eastern thought into Western music. They fall like a moonray across the path.

Gudenian eschewed the microtones usual in so-called "Oriental" music, saying that they were too "sensual" and that he wanted to get at the spirit and "to leave the body alone". He maintained that "nothing reflects the soul of a nation more clearly than its music", and that "[t]his is especially true of Armenian music". He wrote as well in an essay for The Violin World, "As nothing can more clearly reflect the most intimate feelings of a nation than its folk music, Armenian music presents a picture of unique aspect."

During his residence at Lansing, Michigan, Gudenian assembled a collection of oriental instruments from the Middle East, including stringed instruments, flutes, and drums, and subsequently began experimenting with the drums used by dervishes, including small and large gong drums and gypsy drums. He introduced them to western audiences in a recital of his own compositions in early December 1926 at Aeolian Hall, London that met with critical acclaim. His wife Katherine acquired some skill playing the drums and accompanied him in performance.

According to the critic A. H. Fox Strangways, Gudenian's songs were not really collected so much as they were synthesized from what he had heard in the "Orient", omitting what he took to be their imperfections. Strangways says that in the music of the native musicians, Gudenian had discerned an intention to express their thoughts and feelings in a common language everyone could understand, and that he believed their tunes were inspired as much by the elevated conceptions of Omar Khaiyyam's philosophy as they were by the satirical commentary of common workers, and ultimately, by devotion to God and loving one's neighbor.

== Death and legacy ==
After his retirement from public life, Gudenian and his wife Katherine moved to Crescent Beach, Florida. He died in 1972, and was buried at Mt. Hope Cemetery in Lapeer, Michigan. His wife Katherine Lowe Guden was buried beside him after her death in 1997.

Gudenian's papers, including manuscripts, scores, and other papers are held by Stetson University in Deland, Florida.

== Compositions ==
Orchestral Works:

- Nostalgia
- Mulawish II
- In Memorian
- Requiem
- Over the Graves Forward

Songs:

- "Armenian Lullaby"; arranged by Haig Gudenian, ed. by Howard Brockway; violin and piano
- "Lépo-léle" Armenian folk-dance, collected by Haig Gudenian, accompaniment composed by Howard Brockway; violin and piano. [3287
- "The Wolf and the Lamb", collected by Haig Gudenian; arranged for piano by Howard Brockway.
- "Wedding March ", collected by Haig Gudenian; arranged for piano by Howard Brockway.
- "The Sphinx"
- "For the Relief of Ten Thousand Armenian Wanderers"
- "By the Cradle": Armenian folksong
- "Heart-longings": Armenian folksong
- "My Grief": Armenian folksong
- "[The] Well-Beloved": Armenian folksong
- "Alaguiatz" (Armenian Love Song)

Works in BBC Proms:

- The Shepherd (orchestrated by Henry Wood) Proms premiere
- Candy Seller (orchestrated by Henry Wood) Proms premiere
- Pastorale (orchestrated by Henry Wood) Proms premiere

== Books ==
- The Call of the Ancient East: A Few Suggestions for the Understanding of it Through Pure Oriental Music (1951)
- Yogi, the dog (1959)
- Moral Sense and Nightmare (1957–1959)
