= Simon Agopian =

Ottoman Armenian landscape and portrait painter

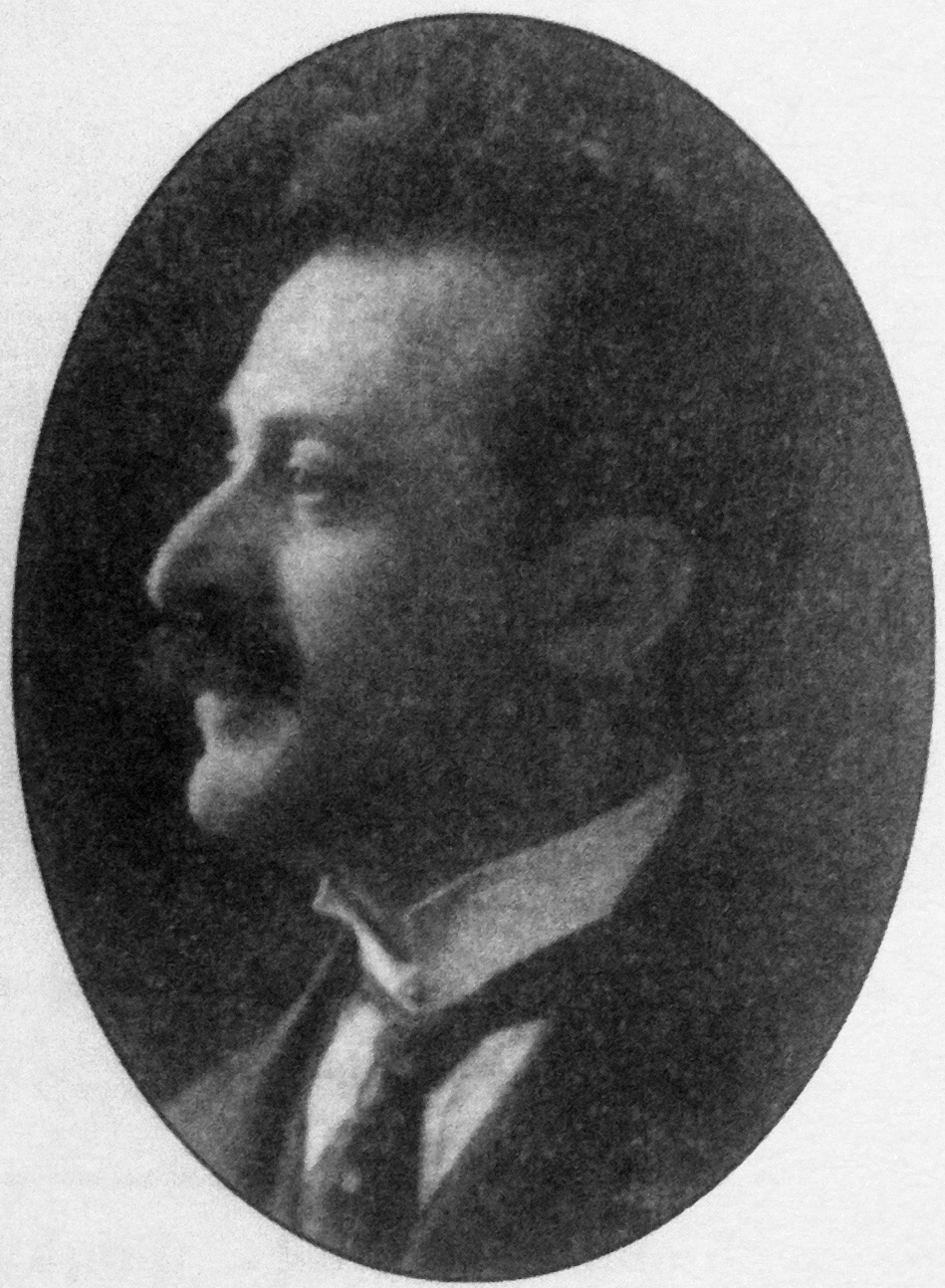
- Born: 1857; Istanbul, Ottoman Empire
- Died: 16 May 1921 (aged 63–64); Istanbul, Ottoman Empire
- Resting place: Şişli Armenian Cemetery
- Education: State Fine Arts School (Ottoman Empire)
- Movement: Orientalist

Simon Agopian or Simon Hagopian at times Simon Agopyan (Armenian: Սիմոն Հակոբյան; Western Armenian Սիմոն Յակոբեան, 1857 - 16 May 1921) was a prominent Ottoman Armenian landscape and portrait painter.

== Life ==
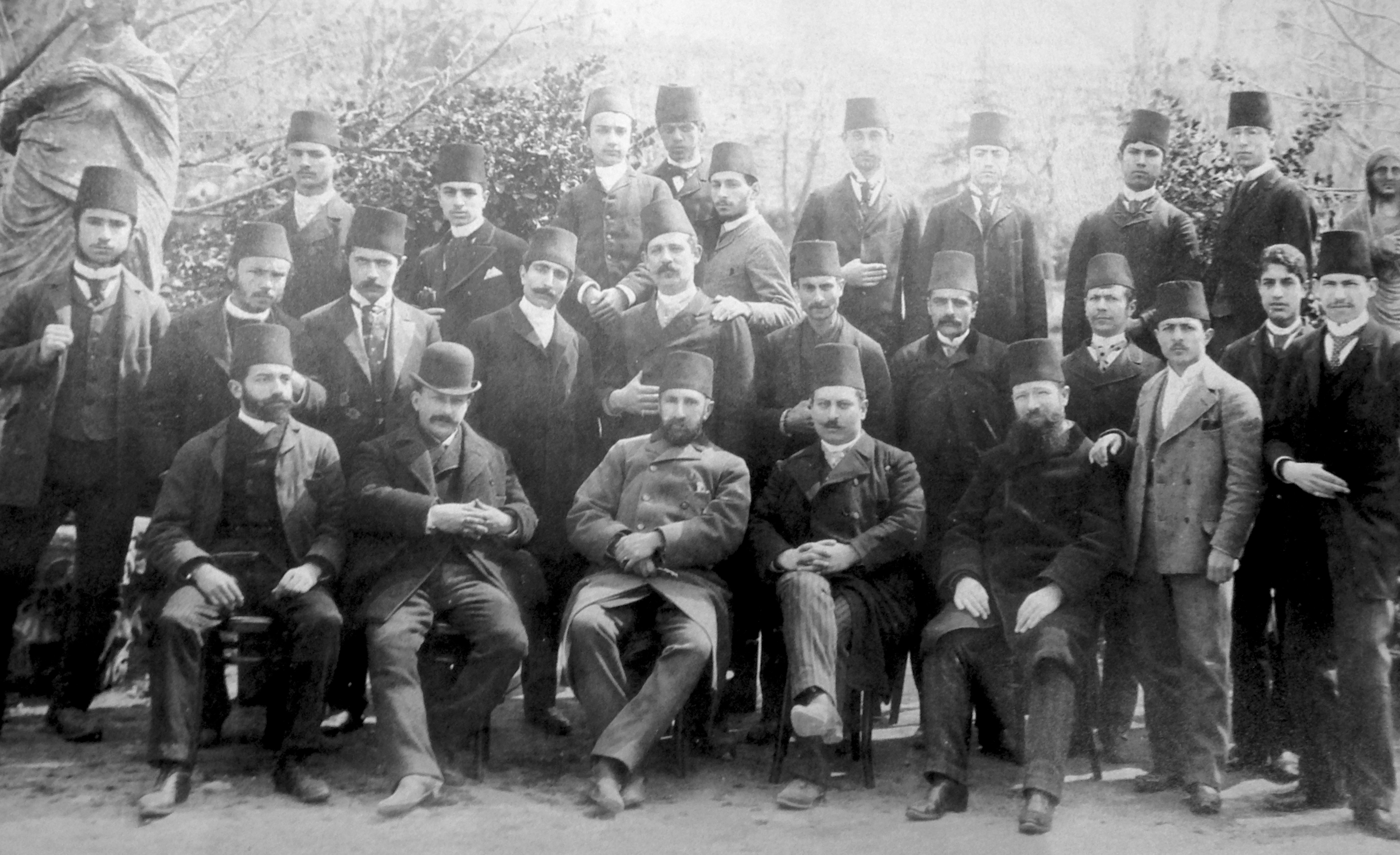
Taken between 1885 and 1887, the photograph depicts the teachers and students of the Imperial Fine Arts School. Simon Agopian is standing in the centre of the second row, fifth from the left.

Simon Agopian was born in Samatya, a district in Istanbul in 1857. He completed his early education at the Horenyan School in Narlikapi and the Sahakyan School in Samatya. He took private lessons from the respected Armenian painter Telemak Ekserciyan and entered the Academy of Fine Arts in 1884, graduating in 1888. While studying at the Academy, Agopian was classmates with Armenian painter Arshak Fetvadjian. Upon graduation, Agopian was awarded first place for a large painting entitled The Imperial Gallery at Eminonu which he executed for his finals. This painting was later purchased by Alexander Vallaury, an architect of the late Ottoman period. He continued his work in his studio in Samatya until 1895, and from then on worked in Beyoğlu. His address was 48 Rue Kechich, Feriköy.

From 1883 onward, Agopian taught art at the Berberyan and Mezburyan schools in Üsküdar, and at the Esayan School near Taksim Square. In 1911 his studio was above the Apollan Photography Studio, and one of the portraits commissioned by Apollon was that of Mehmed Resad which is in the Military Museum in Istanbul. He gave art lessons to the Ottoman princes and other amateurs, and one of his pupils was the painter Vahram Manavyan. An exhibition of his work was help at Angelidis, a shop at 331 Cadde-i Kebir in Beyoğlu in 1896, and his works were last exhibited at the Societa Italiana. He won a prize at the Marseille Exhibition for a portrait of his father.

Simon Agopian died on 16 May 1921 and is buried at the Şişli Armenian Cemetery.

== Works ==
Important works by Agopyan include The Beggar from Van, Porters Crossing the Bridge in Karaköy, A Muslim Beggar, Turkish Neighborhood, Portrait of Sultan Abdulhamit II, and the Selamlik of Sultan Abdülaziz in Ortaköy (which was sold at an auction of Islamic art held by Ader Picard Tajan in Paris on November 18, 1988), six scenes of the Victory won by Gazi Ahmed Muhtar Pasa, The Medresse of Sofulu Seyyif Mehmed Pasa Mosque in Kadirga, a portrait of educationalist Reteos Berberian, A Dervish Beggar in the Courtyard of Mihrimah Sultan Mosque in Üsküdar (1911), and a portrait of Mahrukizade Cafer Bey (1894; which is owned by his grandson Cem Mahruki). He painted a series of Ottoman military successes in his Six Scenes of Victories of Gazi Ahmed Muhtar Paşa on the Eastern Front (1910) which was commissioned by Ahmed Muhtar Pasha’s family.

He also has paintings of Istanbul tradespeople such as simit sellers, fishmongers, and chimney sweepers. Agopyan also painted religious subjects. Examples of the latter are those portraying two of the apostles, Timothy and Parthugiemeos (1888; which he did for the Surp Kevork Church in Samatya).

== Gallery ==
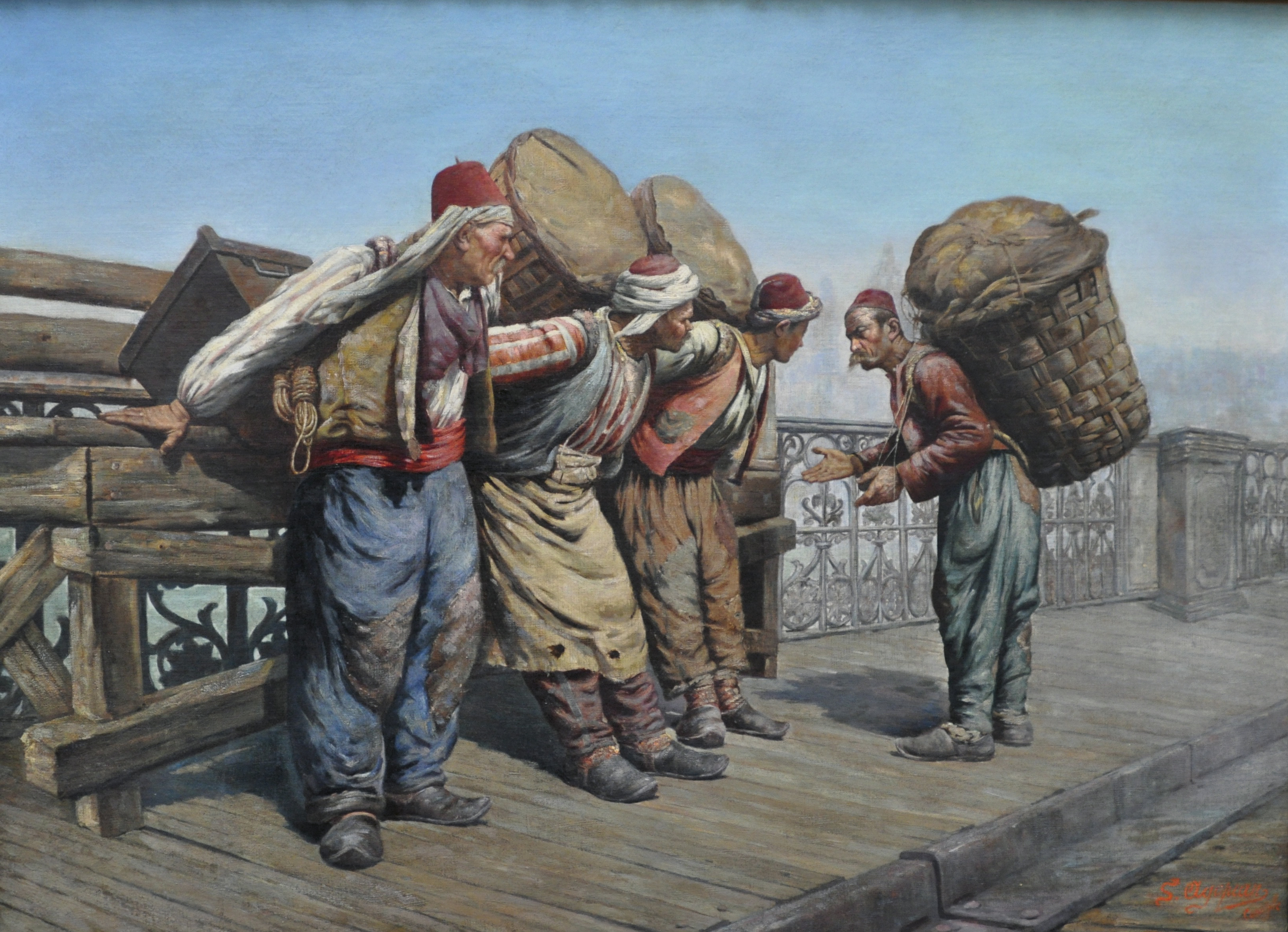
Hamals on the Karaköy Bridge

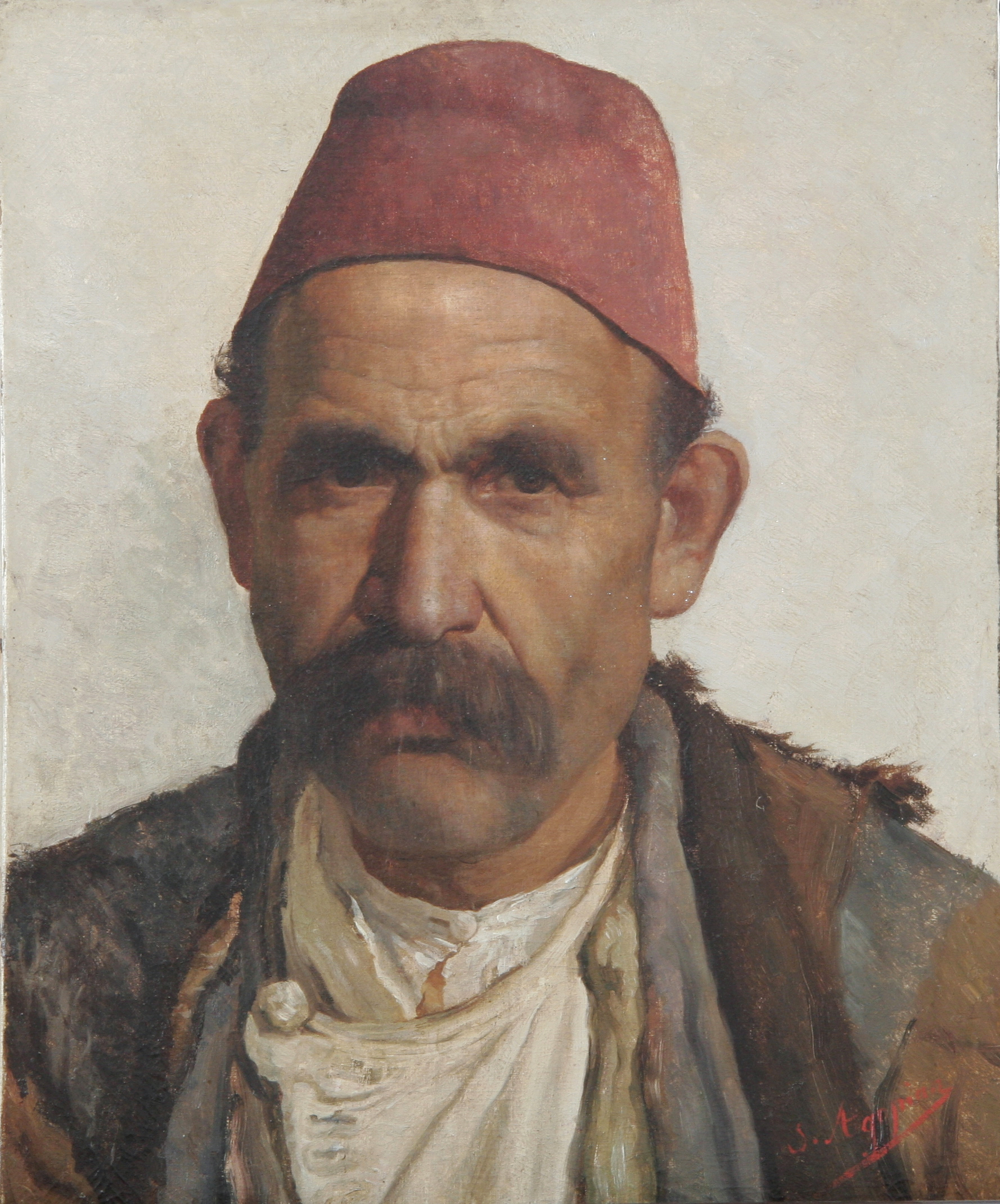
Portrait of a Hamal from Moush

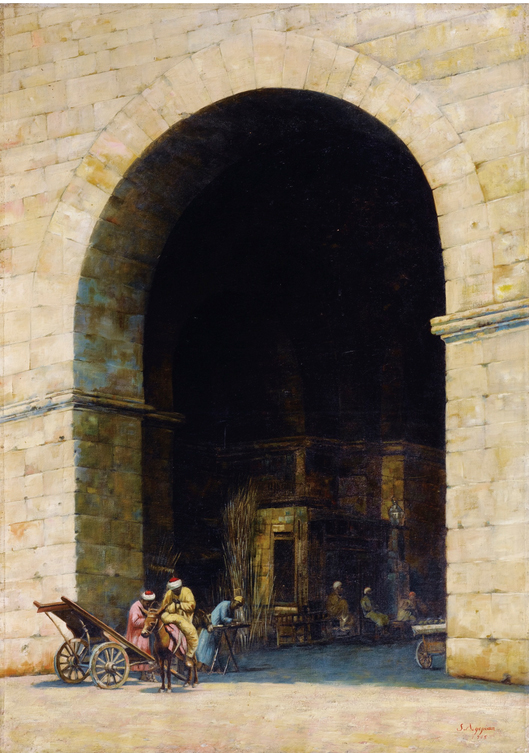
The Entrance of the Souks in Constantinople

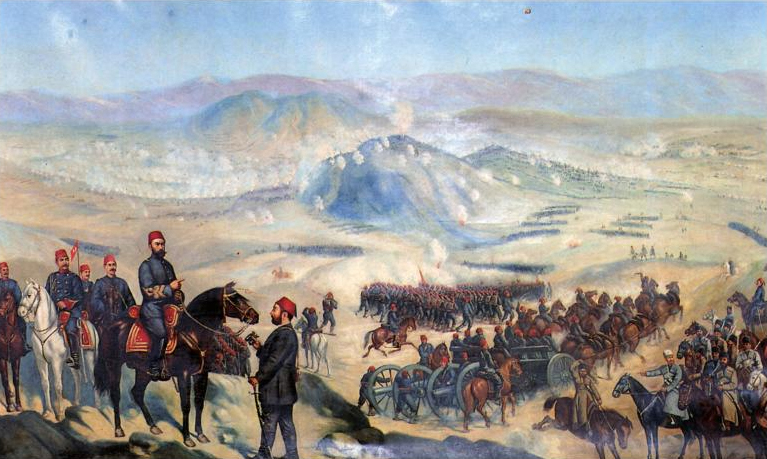
Fighting around Shipka, August 1877

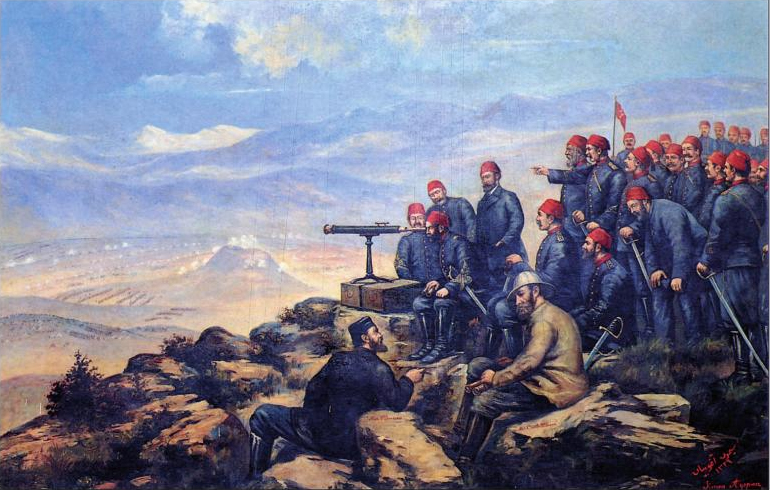
Observing the actions around Ala Dagh, June 21, 1877

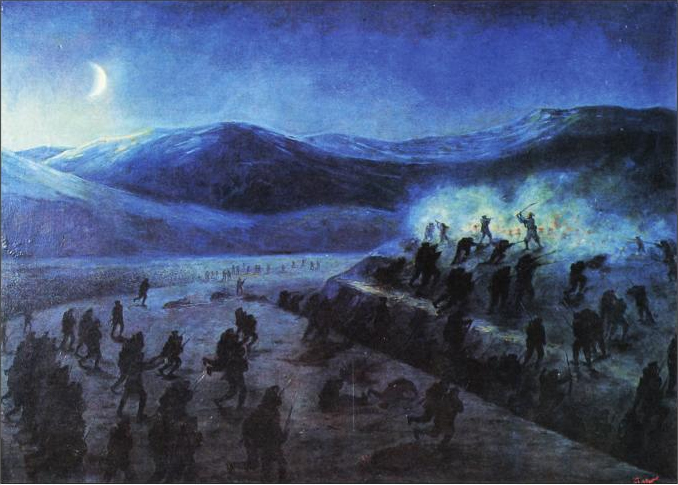
Night Attack at Plevna

== See also ==
- List of Orientalist artists
- Orientalism
