= Araksi Çetinyan =

Araksi Çetinyan (Armenian: Արաքսի Չեթինյան) was the winner of the first beauty contest held in the newly founded Turkish Republic.

The pageant was held by İpek Film on May 3, 1925, or 1926 (sources differ) at Istanbul’s Beyoğlu Melek Cinema Hall (present-day Emek Cinema Hall). However, the contest was not considered serious and was subsequently annulled due to favouritism and lack of organisation. Mustafa Özgur of Vakit newspaper wrote: "In 1926, at a beauty contest attempted by İpek Film Şirketi, an Armenian girl named Miss Araksi Çetinyan was chosen as the winner; however, the contest, which Turkish girls took no interest in, was ultimately disregarded."

In 1929, Çetinyan participated at the first Miss Turkey competition and finished in 3rd place after Feriha Tevfik and Semine Nihat. She was of Armenian descent.
