= Bedros Keresteciyan =

- Պետրոս Քէրէստէճեան
- Born: 1840; Constantinople, Ottoman Empire
- Died: February 27, 1909 (aged 68–69)

Bedros Keresteciyan (Armenian: Պետրոս Քէրէստէճեան, 1840 – 27 February 1909) was an Ottoman Armenian linguist, journalist, translator and writer of the first etymology dictionary of the Turkish language.

== Life ==
Bedros Keresteciyan, of Armenian descent, was born in Constantinople to a family from Kayseri. His father, Krikor, was a lumberjack, thus giving him the last name "Keresteciyan," meaning lumberjack. Bedros attended the Besiktas Armenian Sibyan school. He then moved to İzmir, where he attended the local Mesrobian Armenian school and later attended the local English school. After his studies in Turkey, Bedros continued his studies abroad in Paris. He moved to England, where he studied and learned Italian. When returning to Turkey, Bedros became the manager of the External Communications Office until 1880. A hyperpolyglot in 10 languages and a specialist in financial and economic affairs, Bedros Keresteciyan taught his nephew Berç Keresteciyan in these fields. He became the head journalist of the Tercuman-i Ahval newspaper. He then became manager of the Translations Office of the Finance Ministry until his death in 1907.

== Work ==
In London in 1891, Bedros Keresteciyan's Glanures étymologiques des mots francais: d'origine inconnue ou douteuse, a book on French word origins, was published. In 1900, Keresteciyan published a Turkish-French dictionary. With the help of his nephew Haig, his Quelques matériaux pour un dictionnaire etymologique de la langue Turque was published posthumously in 1912 in London and is considered the first etymology dictionary of the Turkish language. Also published posthumously in 1945 was his Philological and lexicographical study of 6000 words and names Armenian comparisons with 100,000 words, 900 languages, and historical and geographical data, which examined the word origins of the Armenian language.
