= Paramaz =

Armenian revolutionary

- Փարամազ
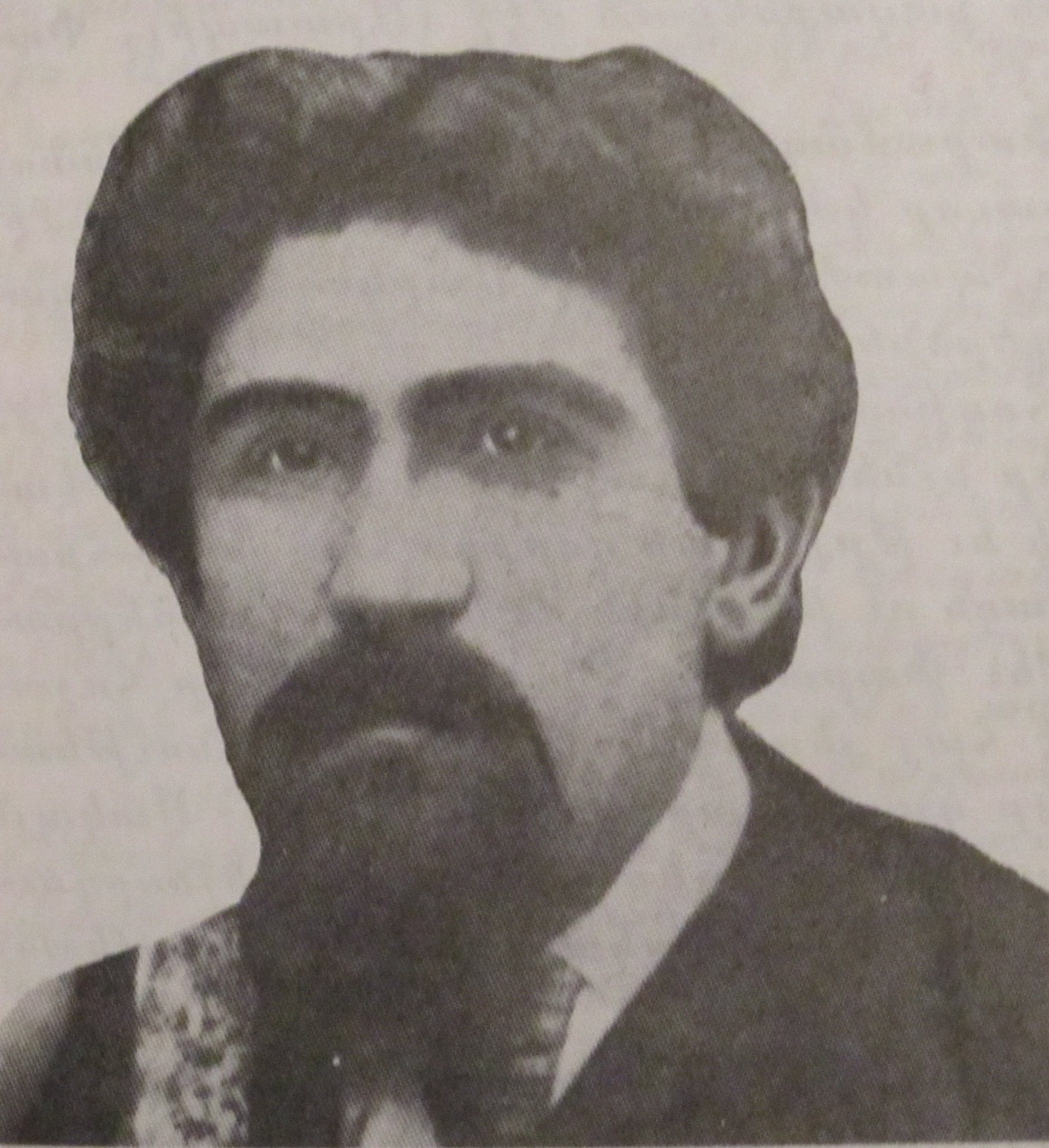
- Born: Matteos Sarkissian; 1863; Meghri, Elisabethpol Governorate, Russian Empire
- Died: 15 June 1915 (aged 51–52); Constantinople, Ottoman Empire
- Military career
- Allegiance: Hunchak
- Service years: 1890s—1915
- Conflicts: Armenian National Liberation Movement; Armenian–Tatar War

Paramaz (Armenian: Փարամազ; 1863–1915), born Matteos Sarkissian, was an Armenian fedayee, freedom fighter, writer and political activist.

== Biography ==
Matteos Sarkissian studied at Gevorkian Seminary of Echmiadzin. In the 1880s he taught in the schools of Nakhichevan where he met Stepan Sapah-Gulian.

Paramaz became the chief advisor to newly created fedayee groups in Persia. As a Hunchakian activist under the nickname of Paramaz, he promoted the revolutionary ideas in the Armenian villages. In 1903 he organized the assassination attempt of Grigory Golitsin, Russian viceroy of the Caucasus.

Besides working in Cilicia, Van and other regions of Western Armenia, he was also active in the Caucasus where he worked to promote friendly interethnic relations.

Paramaz was one of the organizers of self-defense troops during the Armenian-Tatar massacres of 1905–06. In Tatar settlements, he tried to promote anti-Tsarist sentiment and the vision that Armenians and Tatars should live together peacefully.

Paramaz's articles were published in different journals, including Hunchak. One of his plays, Easy come, easy go was staged in Tigranakert.

In 1913, he participated in the 7th Conference of the Social Democrat Hunchakian Party, in Constanţa, where he presented the idea of plotting to assassinate some of the leaders of the Young Turks. The resolutions of the convention were given to the Turkish Government by a spy, and Hunchakian leaders including Paramaz were arrested upon their arrival to Constantinople. After spending two years in Turkish jails, Paramaz was sentenced to death along with 20 other Hunchakians.

On 15 June 1915, Paramaz and 19 othe comrades were hanged in the central square of Constantinople. The incident became known as The 20 Hunchakian gallows. Before his hanging, Paramaz declared to his executioners: "You can only hang our bodies, but not our philosophy... You will see tomorrow on the Eastern horizon a Socialist Armenia".

== Legacy ==
In 2001 the monument of Paramaz was opened in Meghri town, Armenia. His writings were published in a separate book in Yerevan in 1990s.

Paramaz Square was opened in the center of the Uruguayan capital Montevideo by the mayor of the city in 2016.

== See also ==
- The 20 Hunchakian gallows
