= Maryam Goumbassian =

Armenian actress (1831-1909)

- Born: 1831; Constantinople
- Died: 1909 (aged 77–78)
- Occupation: Actress
- Years active: 1862-1884

Maryam Goumbassian (Armenian: Մարիամ Գումբասյան (Ծաղիկյան); 1831, Constantinople – 1909) was an Ottoman Armenian actress. She belonged to the very first group of actresses in the Ottoman Empire, having debuted in 1862. Prior to her career on stage, she had been a governess. She retired in 1884.
