= Manouk Papazian =

Armenian-American luthier (1911-1999)

- Born: August 18, 1911; Smyrna, Ottoman Empire
- Died: October 21, 1999 (aged 88); New York City, United States
- Occupation: Luthier

Manouk Papazian (August 18, 1911 – October 21, 1999) was an Armenian-American luthier. He came from Smyrna (now İzmir) in what was then the Ottoman Empire.

== Biography ==
Manouk Papazian was born to an Armenian family in Smyrna, on August 18, 1911. At the time, Smyrna was a diverse city on the Aegean coast. His family fled the Armenian genocide and escaped to Thessaloniki in 1922. Papazian did well academically; outside of school, he took violin lessons, designed rugs, and drew pictures. He worked for a furniture business owned by his brother.

After World War II, Papazian emigrated to Buenos Aires, Argentina. It was there that he began his career as a luthier. He made a variety of instruments, including guitars, by copying wholesale models. He moved again in 1956 to New York, where his older brother lived. Papazian opened his own workshop, specializing in guitar design. He built some 900 guitars over the course of his career, and he also created ouds, lutes, archlutes, violins, vihuelas, and cellos. Papazian admired the work of French luthier Francois Tout. He retired in 1981 and became a United States citizen two years later.

Manouk Papazian died in New York City on October 21, 1999.
