= Aram Achekbashian =

Armenian politician (1867–1915)

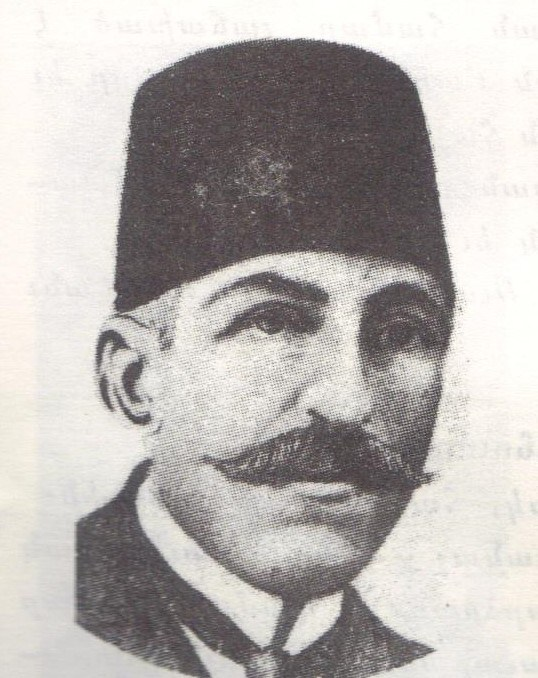
Aram Achekbashian

Aram Achekbashian (Armenian: Արամ Աչըքպաշյան, 1867 in Arapgir – 1915 in Constantinople) was an Armenian politician who became a member of Social-Democrat Hunchakian Party Central Committee in 1903.

== Biography ==
In 1886, Achekbashian entered the Faculty of Law at Constantinople University. In 1889, Hambartsum Boyajian introduced him to the Hunchakian committee members. He became one of the organizers of Kum Kapu Affray. Beginning in 1894, Achekbashian was one of the organizers of Minor Armenia fedayi movement. He rejected the idea running for a seat in the Ottoman Parliament. In 1915, he was hanged by the Ottoman government along with 19 colleagues.

== Bibliography ==
- Martyrs on Bloody Path, by Dr Yeghia Jerejian, Beirut, 1989, p. 37-39
- The Armenian Question, encyclopedia, Ed. by acad. K. Khudaverdyan, Yerevan, 1996
