= Hrand Alyanak =

Ottoman Armenian painter (1880–1938)

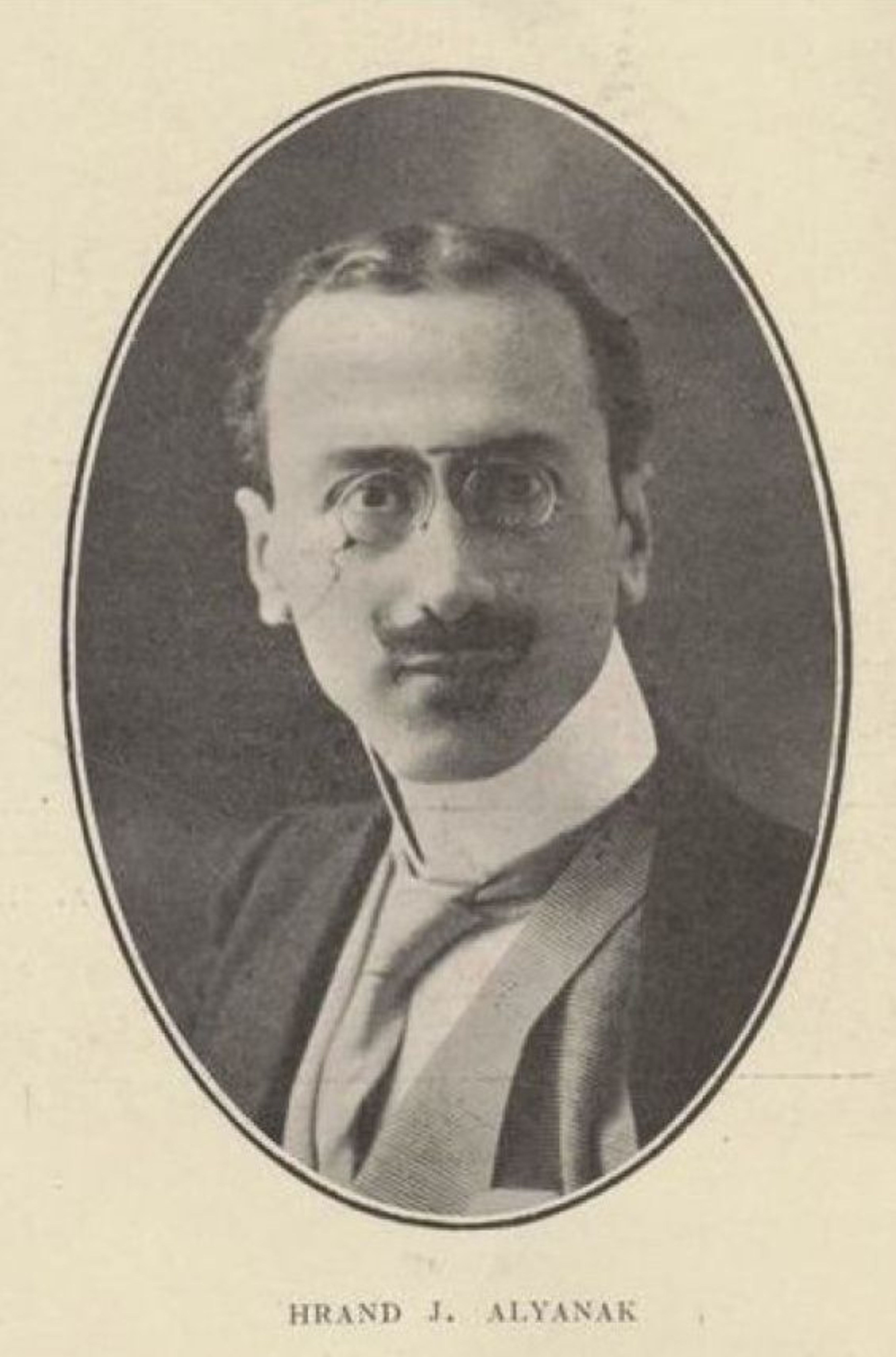
Hrand Alyanak (date unknown)

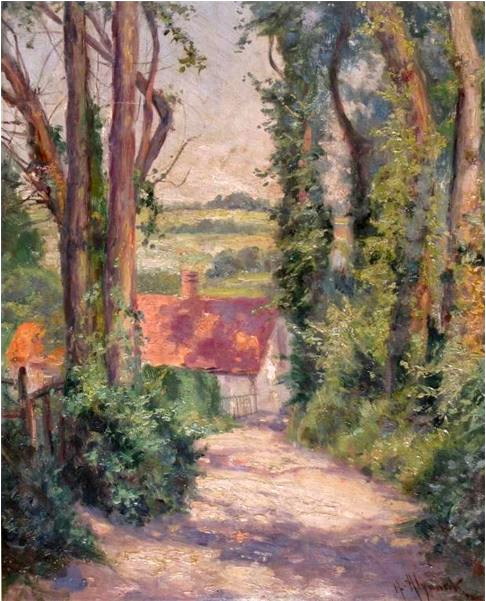
The Farm at Criel-sur-Mer

Hrand Hovsep Alyanak (Armenian: Հրանտ Հովսեփի Ալյանաք; 1880, Istanbul – 1938, Paris) was an Ottoman Armenian painter and author.

== Biography ==
He studied at the Armenian schools in Istanbul, where he first showed an aptitude for art. From 1893 to 1895, he studied at the Academy of Fine Arts, taking lessons from Salvator Valeri.

He fled during the Hamidian massacres and, in 1896 went to Bulgaria. From there, he went to the Caucasus, where he worked as an artist in Tbilisi and Baku for five years, and wrote articles for local Armenian newspapers. He went to Paris in 1907 and worked mainly at copying paintings in museums. His landscapes, shown in exhibitions at the Salon des Indépendants, generated considerable interest. He would live in Paris for twenty-five years altogether.

Alyanak was a member of the Union of Foreign Press Reporters, and in 1923 he was awarded the Ordre des Palmes académiques. His paintings, "Sunset over Istanbul Harbour" and "A Fisherman's Hut in Istanbul", were exhibited in Paris in 1926 and well received. He died in Paris in 1938.

He contributed numerous articles and essays to French and Armenian publications, on a variety of subjects. Most were signed with pseudonyms, many consisting merely of initials.
