= Kegham Vanigian =

Armenian politician (1889 – 1915)

Kegham Vanigian, one of the so-called "20 Martyrs" hanged by the Turkish government in 1915.

Kegham Vanigian (Armenian: Գեղամ Վանիկեան), also known as "Vanig," (1889–1915) was an Armenian political activist and newspaper editor. Vanigian is best remembered as the founder of the socialist monthly Gaidz of the Hnchak party. Vanigian was executed by the Turkish government for his political activities in 1915 during the Armenian genocide.

== Biography ==
Kegham Vanigian was born in Van, Ottoman Armenia, Ottoman Empire in 1889.

In 1907 he finished the Yeremian college of Van, where his uncle, Hakob Ardzruni was one of his teachers. In 1904 he met Ashot's Hunchakian fedayi group and joined the party. After finishing the college he lived in Caucasus for a short time, then moved to Constantinople and finished the Law department of the University in 1914.

In 1909, Vanigian became one of the founders of Gaidz Student's Union. He was the founding editor of and contributor to Gaidz monthly, started in 1911, which promoted the ideas of scientific socialism. Vanigian participated at Hunchakian 6th Conference. He was a cadet of a military school when he was arrested among with his Hunchakian friends. In 1915, 20 of them, including Vanigian, were hanged in Constantinople by the Turkish government.

== Bibliography ==
- Yeghia Jerejian, Martyrs on Bloody Path. Beirut, 1989, pp. 31–33.
- K. Khudaverdyan (ed.), The Armenian Question. Yerevan, 1996.
