= Güllü Agop =

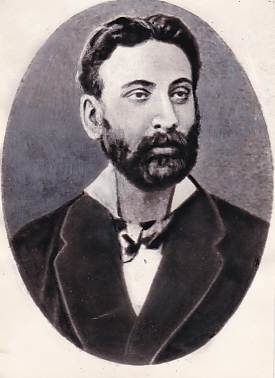
- Güllü Agop in his early days
- Born: 1840; Constantinople, Ottoman Empire
- Died: 1902 (aged 61–62); Constantinople (Istanbul), Ottoman Empire
- Occupation: Theatre director

Hagop Vartovyan (Armenian: Յակոբ Վարդովեան), better known as Güllü Agop (Armenian: Կիւլլիւ Յակոբ), (took later the name Yakub because converted to Islam), (1840 in Istanbul – 1902 in Istanbul) was an Ottoman Armenian theatre director as well as an occasional actor.

He is widely credited with having laid the bases for Turkey's modern and nationally renowned performing arts institution that became the Istanbul City Theatres (Turkish: İstanbul Şehir Tiyatroları). In his qualities of organizer, sponsor and figure of support for writers and spectators, Güllü Agop is one of the 19th century pioneers of the Turkish Theatre art as a whole. He was accepted as the founder of the modern Turkish Theatre. As an Ottoman Armenian, Güllü Agop was regularly showing Armenian shows in his theatre; after 1868, he decided to provide regular Turkish shows

== Biography ==
Vartovyan was born in 1840 in Istanbul with the name Agop Vartovyan to Armenian parents. "Güllü Agop" (literally Jacob the Rosy) was the name under which he had come to be known in the world of theatre. He converted to Islam in his forties and took the name "Yakub". He is the father of Necip Yakup Aşkın, considered as one of the most prominent violin masters Turkey produced and his grandson, Yücel Aşkın, was the rector of Van's Yüzüncü Yıl University. He works an academician in the university and is chairman of Environmental Engineering.

Güllü Agop had another son called İhsan Aşkın. After retiring from the army where he served as colonel, he became an actor and took part in around 50 movies.
