= David Çıraciyan =

David Çıraciyan Տաւիտ Չիրաճեան
- Born: March 21, 1839; Istanbul, Ottoman Empire
- Died: 1907 (aged 68); Istanbul, Ottoman Empire
- Occupation: Painter

David Çıraciyan (Armenian: Տաւիտ Չիրաճեան, March 21, 1839 – 1907) was a prominent Ottoman painter of Armenian descent.

== Biography ==
Born in Istanbul, Çıraciyan attended a local Armenian Catholic School. He studied painting in studios and traveling throughout Egypt and Europe, but had no diploma in art. Mgirdic Civanyan was one of his artistic influences. He taught art at the Imperial Civil Service School in Istanbul and later Mercan. He received a Fine Arts Medal.

== Artwork ==
The oldest of Çıraciyan's paintings date back to the later half of the 19th century. The Çıraciyan paintings from the 1890s employ typical and picturesque scenes of Istanbul as subjects. These were also subjects used by the contemporary Ottoman artists of Istanbul such as Garabet Yazmaciyan and Mgirdic Civanyan. The Maiden's Tower, Rumeli Hisarı Peer, Küçüksu Summer Palace, Bosphorus from the Hills of Anadolu Hisar, Seraglio Point and Topkapı Palace, Buyukdere, the hills behind Rumeli Hisar and Yenikoy are the locations that are most common in Çıraciyan's paintings.

David Çiraciyan's paintings are generally brighter and more colorful than his contemporaries, with a domination of pale blues. It has been observed Çıraciyan used photographs as a basis for his settings of his compositions. He also used these photographs directly as a background for his paintings.

== Works ==
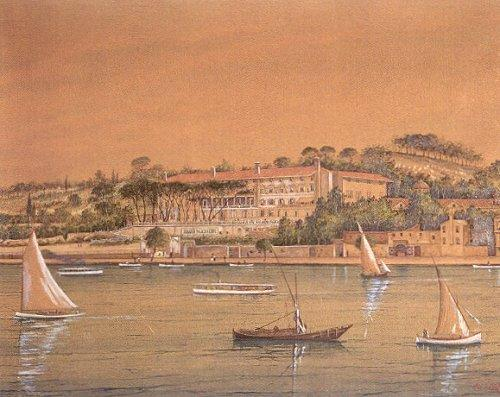
Scene of Büyükada from Marmara Sea

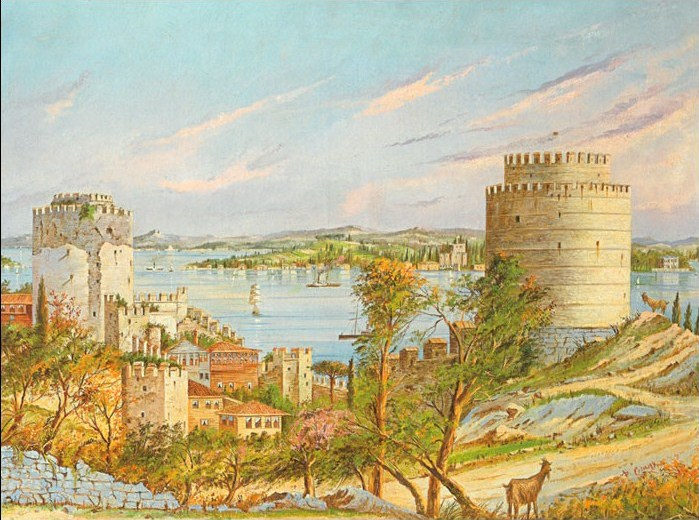
Rumeli Hisar

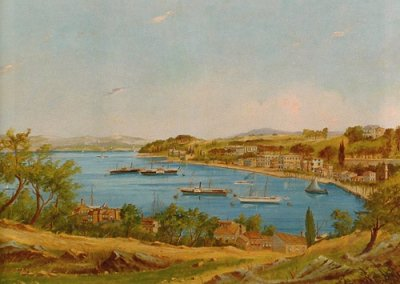
Scene of Tarabya

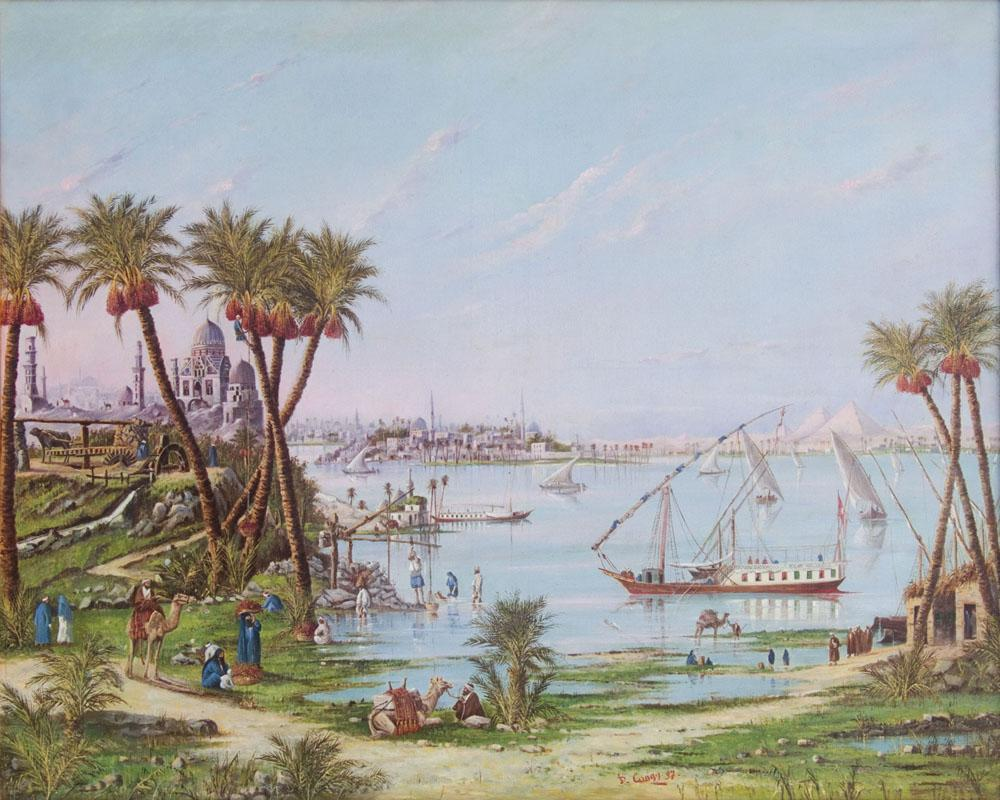
Nile Coast

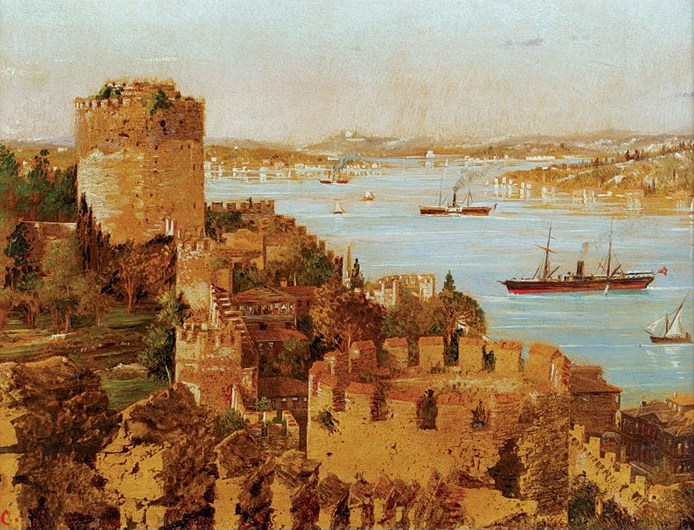
Rumeli Hisar

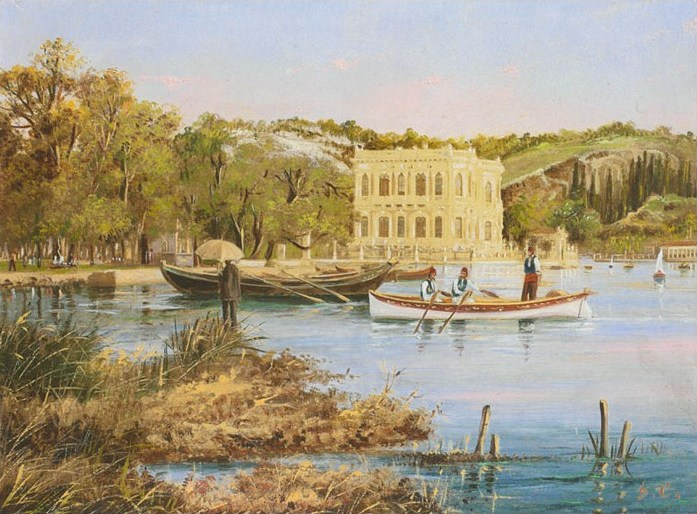

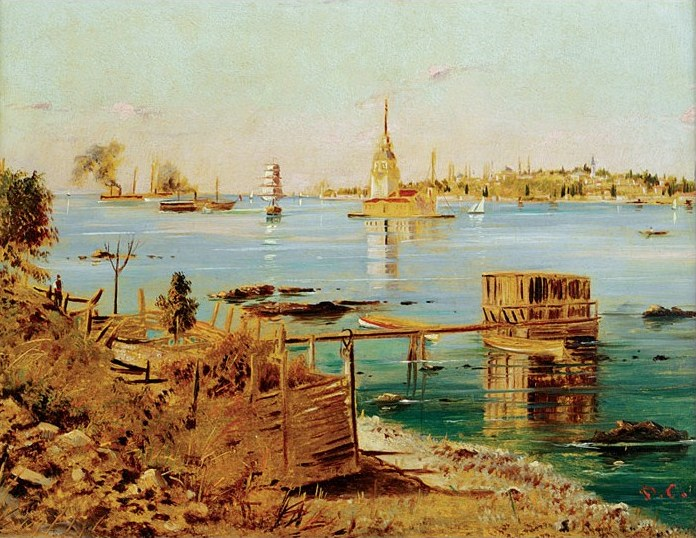

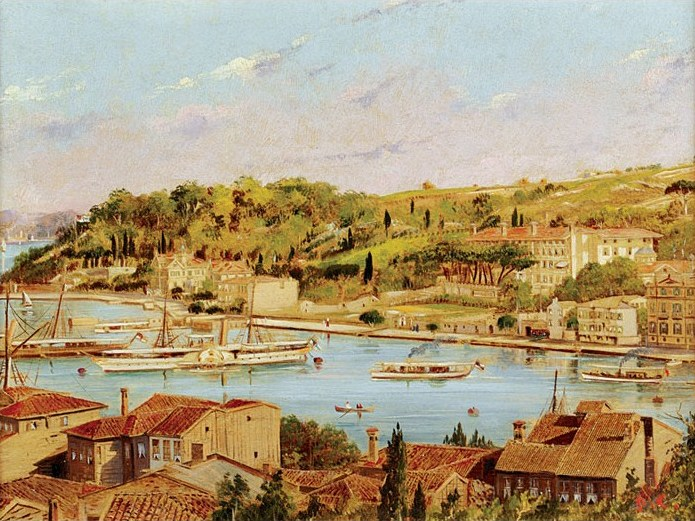

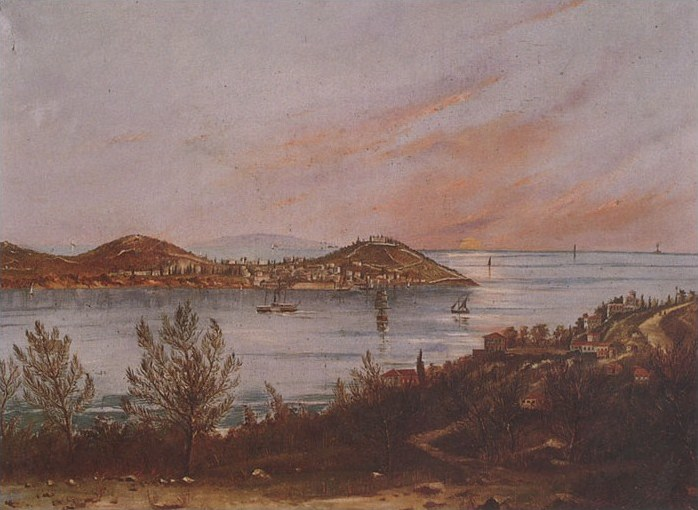
Peyzaj

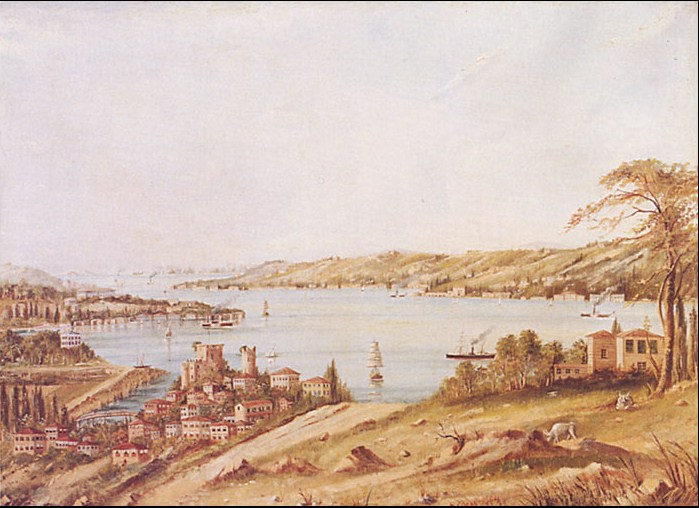
The Bosphorus and Anadolu Hisari
