= Galata Tower =

Tower in Istanbul, Turkey

- Galata Kulesi
- The logo used after the tower was converted into a museum following its restoration in 2020 (Note: The date 528 in the logo is an incorrect date given in some sources for the construction of the tower.)

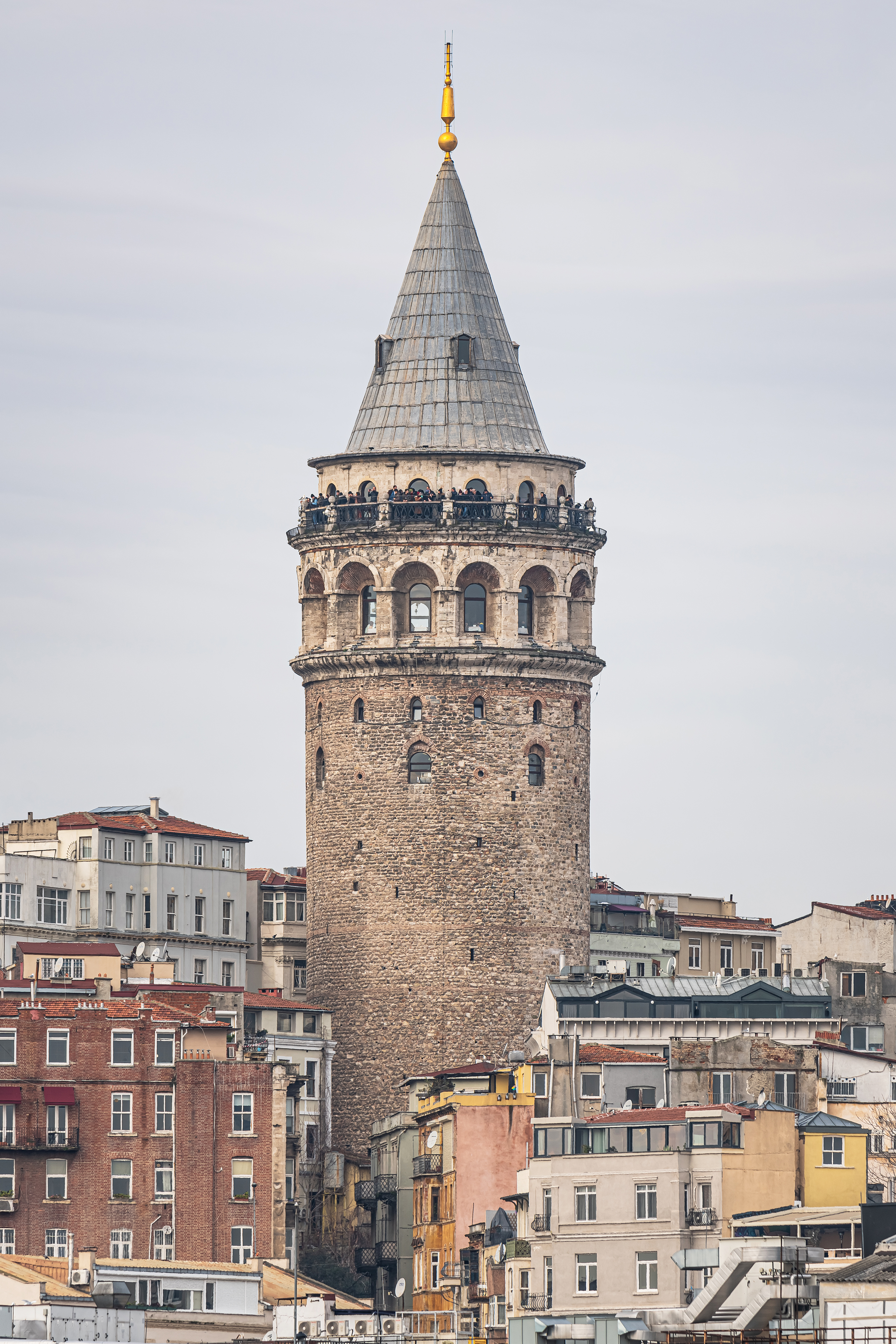
- View of the tower (February 2020)
- Former names: Christea Turris (Tower of Christ)

General information
- Type: Touristic building; museum; exhibition place; Formerly: watchtower; observation tower; fire tower
- Architectural style: Romanesque
- Location: Istanbul, Turkey
- Coordinates: 41°1′32.36″N 28°58′26.96″E
- Completed: 1348; 678 years ago
- Renovated: 1453; 1510; 1794; 1832; 1875; 1965–1967; 1999–2000; 2020; 2023
- Owner: Directorate General of Foundations

Height
- Architectural: 62.59 m (205 ft)
- Top floor: 40.04 m (131 ft)

Dimensions
- Diameter: Interior: 8.95 m (29.4 ft); Exterior: 16.45 m (54.0 ft)

Technical details
- Structural system: Masonry
- Material: Stone
- Floor count: 11 (including the basement, the ground floor and the mezzanine)
- Lifts/elevators: 2
- Grounds: 208 m^{2} (2,240 sq ft)

Website
- https://galatakulesi.gov.tr/

Galata Tower (Turkish: Galata Kulesi), or Galata Tower Museum (Turkish: Galata Kulesi Müzesi), its name since it began to be used as a museum, is a tower located in the Beyoğlu district of Istanbul. It takes its name from the Galata neighborhood where it stands. Built as a watchtower within the Walls of Galata, the tower has served various purposes over different periods and has functioned as an exhibition venue and museum since 2020. It is one of the landmark structures of both Beyoğlu and Istanbul.

In 1267, the Genoese, who were allied with the Byzantine Empire, established a colony called "Pera" in Galata, north of the Golden Horn, and gradually expanded their sphere of control with permissions granted by the Byzantines. Known at the time as the "Tower of the Holy Cross" (Turris Sancte Crucis) because of the cross at its summit, the tower was built between 1335 and 1349 as part of the fortifications constructed in the area, after the Genoese expanded their sphere of control toward the hill to the northeast in violation of these permissions. The war that broke out between the two states that year ended with a treaty signed the following year, and the hill on which the tower stood was placed under Genoese control. Following the conquest of Constantinople by the Ottoman Empire on 29 May 1453, the Genoese in Pera surrendered the colony to the Ottomans without resistance. Although some damage was inflicted on the fortifications in Galata, including the tower, destruction of the tower was halted by decree of Ottoman Sultan Mehmed II, and the damaged sections were rebuilt. The tower, which was damaged in the earthquake of 1509, was repaired by 1510. In the 16th and 17th centuries, it was used to house prisoners of war and as a supply warehouse; from the 18th century onward, it was used as a fire lookout tower by the Mehterhane corps and fire watchers.

Following the fire of 1794, repairs altered the tower's design, and its upper section was converted into a coffeehouse. Its design was changed once again after the fire of 1831. After its roof collapsed during a storm in 1875, two timber-framed masonry floors were added above the top floor, and this section began to be used to observe and report fires in the city. During restoration work between 1965 and 1967, the tower was arranged as a tourist attraction with floors serving different purposes, and its roof was renewed in a style resembling its design between 1832 and 1876. During this period, it was leased from the Istanbul Municipality and operated by Ünal Kardeşler and, subsequently, by a company belonging to their heirs. Its exterior underwent restoration in 1999–2000. In 2013, BELTUR, affiliated with the Istanbul Metropolitan Municipality, took over its operation. At that time, the top two floors housed a café and a restaurant, respectively. That same year, it was included on UNESCO's Tentative List of World Heritage Sites. In 2019, ownership and operation passed to the Directorate General of Foundations. Following work carried out in 2020, the tower was converted into a museum and exhibition venue. Restoration work was undertaken on its roof in 2023.

The masonry tower, built in the Romanesque style, stands 62.59 m tall to the tip of its roof. Its cylindrical shaft is made of stone. It has 11 floors, including a basement, a ground floor, and a mezzanine. An elevator runs from the ground floor to the sixth floor, while stone stairs extend from the ground floor to the fourth floor and steel-structure stairs from the sixth to the eighth floor. The conical roof covering the summit is made of reinforced concrete. Today, the ground floor serves as a ticket-control and security area, and the entrance to the elevator reaching the sixth floor is also located there. The first floor houses the museum shop. The next three floors contain permanent museum and exhibition areas featuring, respectively, a simulation area with a screen showing an animation of Hezârfen Ahmed Çelebi gliding from the Galata Tower, exhibits concerning the period when the tower was used by Taqi al-Din, photographs from the Turkish War of Independence, information and artifacts relating to the Galata Tower and its walls, and exhibits about the Galata Tower and Istanbul. Beyond the sixth floor, which serves as a transitional area, the seventh floor is a temporary exhibition space containing a scale model depicting part of Istanbul and viewing telescopes positioned by the windows. The eighth floor is arranged as an observation terrace. The tower's exterior and the surrounding area are also used on certain special and designated days for awareness campaigns, commemorations, and celebrations.

== History ==
=== Background, construction, and the Genoese period ===
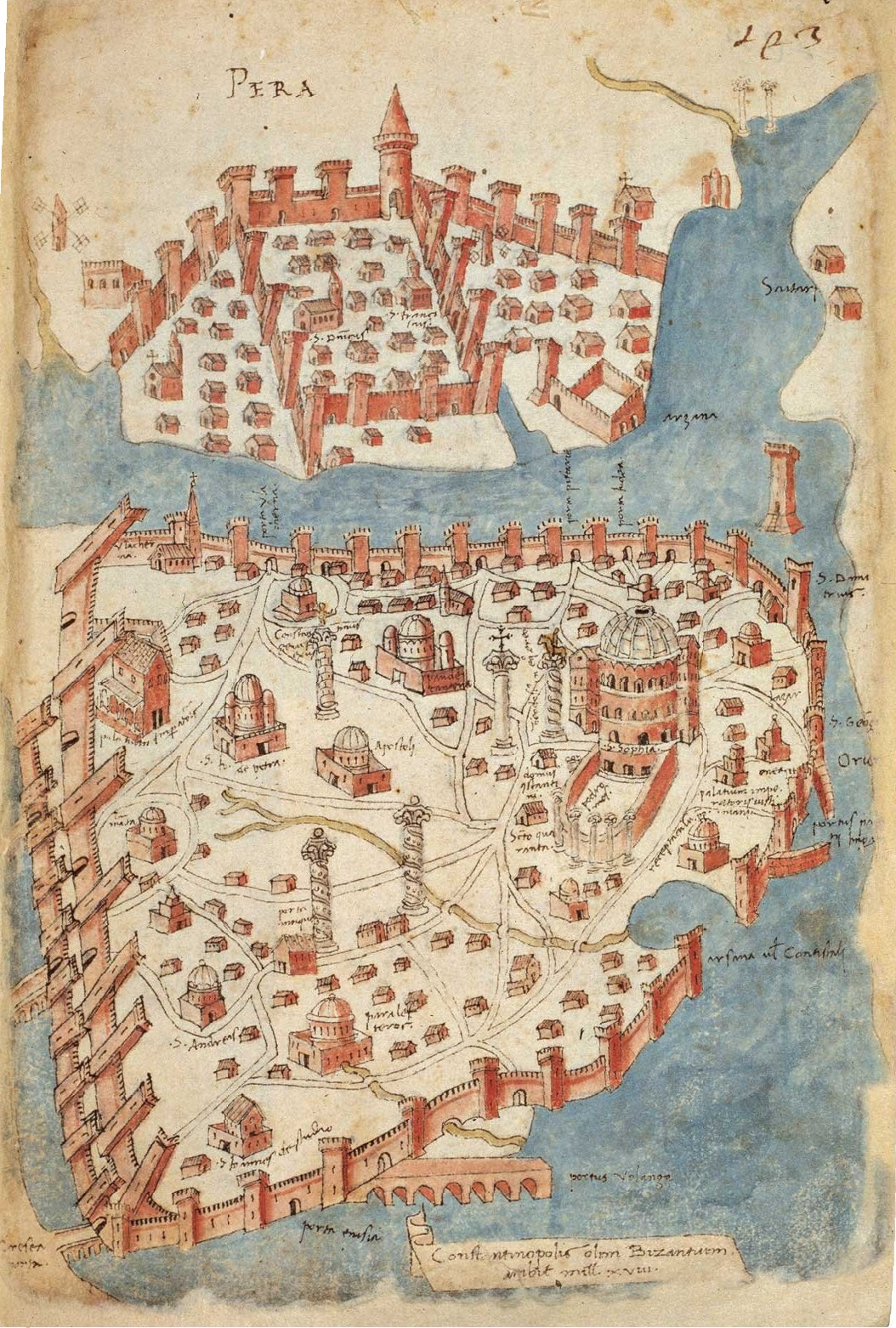
The Galata Tower stands at the highest point of the walls in the upper part of the map in a copy of Liber insularum Archipelagi by Cristoforo Buondelmonti, dated to around the 1420s or 1430s and held at the Biblioteca Nazionale Marciana.

In 1267, the Genoese, who were allied with the Byzantine Empire, established a colony called "Pera" in Galata, north of the Golden Horn. The Genoese expanded their sphere of control toward the hill northeast of the area without authorization and, between 1335 and 1349, built fortification walls and towers surrounded by moats on the slopes of the hill. The structure now known as the Galata Tower was built in 1348. In addition to serving as a watchtower, it was the principal tower of the fortifications intended to protect the colony's coastal section on the flat ground against a possible land-based siege. In front of the tower stood a barbican that projected in a semicircle from the straight line of the walls and was attached to the structure on both sides. This area, where four lines of walls converged and the main entrance to Pera was located, was the last fortification built before Pera came under the control of the Ottoman Empire. According to the plaque there, its construction was completed on 1 April 1452. During this period, the tower was known as "Turris S. [Sancte] Crucis" ("Tower of the Holy Cross"), after the cross at its summit.

In August 1348, a war broke out between the Byzantines and the Genoese as a result of commercial disputes. After the war ended in 1349 with a Byzantine victory, peace was established, and that same year a decree issued by Byzantine Emperor John VI transferred control of the hill on which the Galata Tower stood to the Genoese.

=== Ottoman period ===
A map from a copy of Liber insularum Archipelagi dated to 1485–1490, held at the University and State Library Düsseldorf.

Following the Ottoman conquest of Constantinople on 29 May 1453, the Genoese in Pera surrendered the colony to Ottoman control without resistance. During this period, the damage inflicted on the tower's summit was halted following an edict issued by Ottoman Sultan Mehmed II concerning Pera. As part of restoration work led by Zağanos Pasha, the tower was raised again, and the cross at its summit was replaced with the Flag of the Ottoman Empire.

The earthquake of 1509 caused damage to the fortifications in Galata, including the Galata Tower. Repairs led by Mimar Hayreddin were completed in mid-1510, and the tower was raised again. Two brick bands on the tower's shaft, at heights of 13.20 m (the beginning of the second floor) and 17.17 m (the beginning of the third floor), are considered evidence of repairs made after this earthquake. Sources differ regarding the extent of these repairs.

In the 16th century, the Galata Tower and the other towers along the Walls of Galata were used as accommodation and a dungeon for Christian prisoners of war working at the shipyards in Kasımpaşa. In his 17th-century work Seyahatnâme, Evliya Çelebi wrote that the tower had formerly served as a dungeon and, in his time, as a supply warehouse for the shipyard. Taqi al-Din also carried out some work in the tower before the construction of his observatory. From the 18th century onward, the tower was used as a fire lookout tower by the Mehterhane corps and fire watchers.

Due to damage caused by a fire on 27 July 1794, the tower was shortened and its design altered. As part of the work, rooms projecting from each side of the uppermost floor, corridors, and a reception hall were added, and this section was converted into a coffeehouse. A large drum was installed to announce fires, while the attic was used as a dovecote. A fire on 2–3 August 1831 caused further damage. The upper section was repaired according to an earlier design, giving the tower its present-day appearance, apart from the roof that would collapse in the storm of 1875.

The tower's roof was repaired in either 1853 or 1854. During construction of the building to be used by the Sixth Municipal District, which was established in December 1857 to administer Galata and Pera, the courtyard surrounding the tower, the gates in the walls, and the sections of wall extending toward the shore began to be demolished under a decision adopted on 30 November 1863. The surrounding moats were also filled in. These works took place during the construction of the municipal building in 1864.

After the roof collapsed in a storm in 1875, a two-story timber structure with masonry elements was built above the top floor, with one room on each floor. The summit began to serve as a fire-reporting station for the fire brigade established in the city in 1874 and as a communications center for the Ottoman Navy.

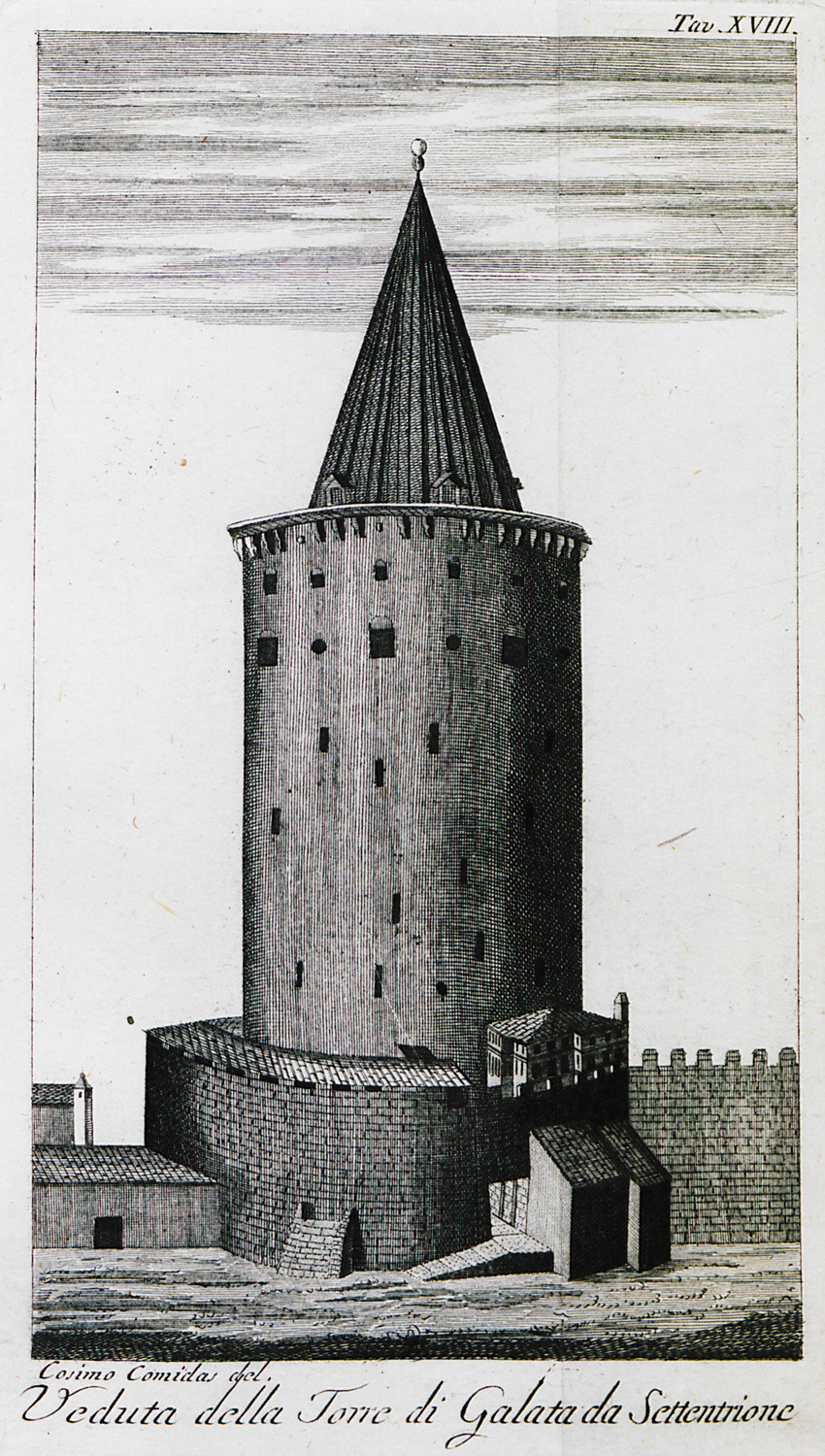
Depiction in a 1794 work by Comidas Cosimo

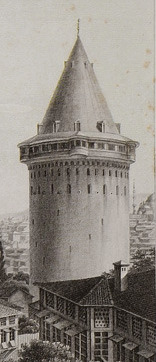
Engraving in a 1819 work by Antoine Ignace Melling

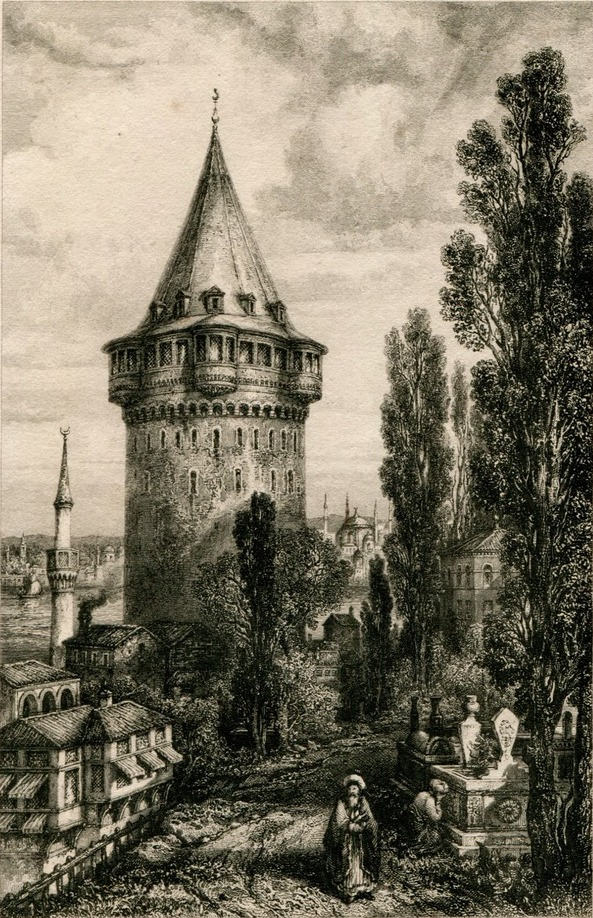
Engraving by François Lemaitre in an 1840 work by Joseph Jouannin and Jules van Gaver

Drawing in a work published by Eugène Flandin in 1853

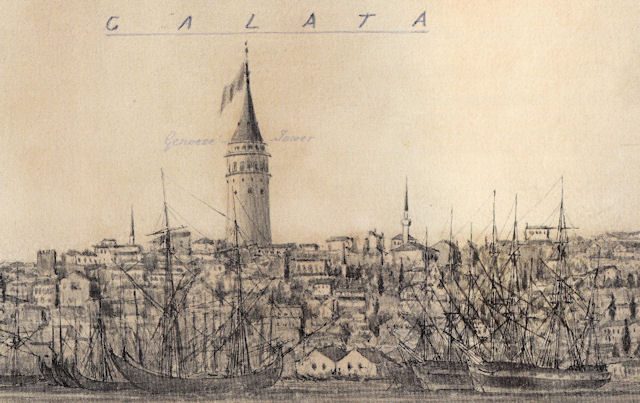
The tower and its surroundings in a drawing made around 1855 by Montague B. Dunn, who visited the city during the Crimean War (1853–1856)

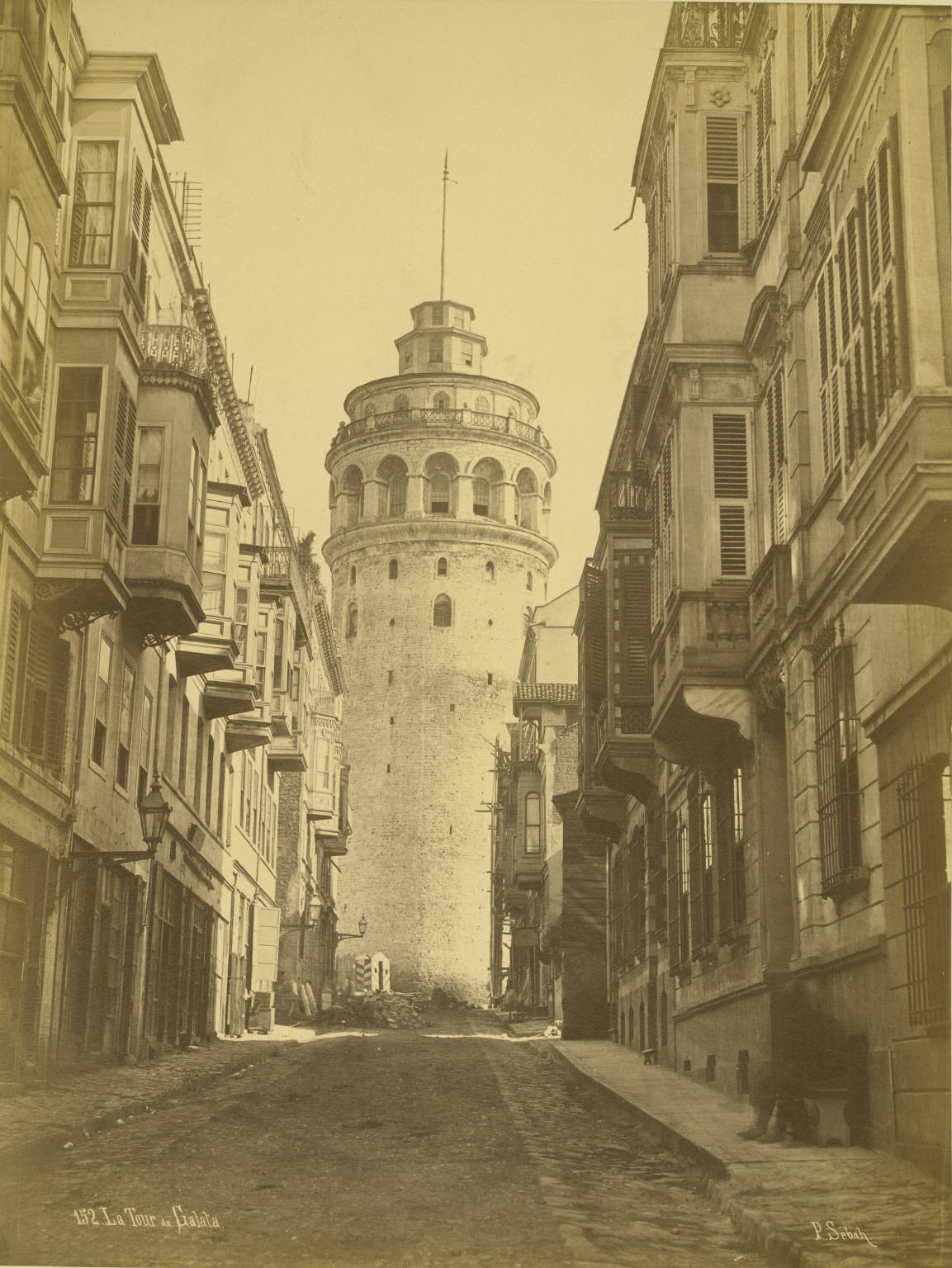
Photograph of the tower taken by Pascal Sébah (after 1875)

A photograph of the tower dated 1901

=== Republican era ===
==== Use until the 1960s, the 1965 restoration, and subsequent years ====
Following the proclamation of the Republic in Turkey in 1923, the tower continued to be used by the fire brigade and the Turkish Naval Forces. The time ball at the British Naval Hospital, dismantled in February 1930 and installed atop the tower in March 1930, began operating in November 1934.

During the winter of 1959–1960, the wooden rooms in the upper section were evacuated after their beams rotted and collapsed. Following an initiative by Istanbul Mayor Haşim İşcan, it was decided to repair and restore the tower and convert it into a tourist facility. Yapıtaş won the tender for the work on 15 September 1964. The tower reopened at a ceremony on 28 September 1967.

As part of the work, the basement was arranged as a service floor. The ground floor became an entrance level, and two elevators running from this floor to the sixth floor were installed opposite the entrance axis. The first floor was arranged as an Oriental coffeehouse, the second as a museum about the tower's history, the third as a sales floor for tourist souvenirs, the fourth as a tavern named Ceneviz Meyhanesi, the fifth as a kitchen for the tower's food and beverage facilities, the sixth as a lobby with toilets and a cloakroom, and the eighth floor—the highest floor accessible to visitors—as a nightclub. Ünal Kardeşler, who built the restaurant section, also leased the tower's operating rights from the Istanbul Municipality for five years following a tender in February 1968. After the alterations, the tower officially opened as a tourist facility on 30 May 1969. The brothers' lease agreement with the Municipality was renewed annually after the initial five-year period.

Under a Council of Ministers decision published in the T.C. Resmî Gazete on 3 September 1989 and brought into force, an area called Galata Tower and Its Surroundings was designated a "tourism center," bringing the tower and its surroundings under the authority of the Ministry of Culture and Tourism of Turkey.

==== The 1999–2000 restoration and transfer to the Istanbul Metropolitan Municipality ====
A view from the tower's eighth floor, which housed a restaurant until 2020 (June 2011)

At a meeting of the Istanbul Metropolitan Municipal Council in October 1996, a decision was made to convert the tower into a museum and transfer its ownership to the Municipality's Directorate of Libraries and Museums. Pekerler İnşaat won the tender issued that year to restore the tower and convert it into a museum. A lawsuit filed that year to evict the Ünal Kardeşler company, which continued to operate the tower, was dismissed. In December 1997, however, an order was issued to halt the project because such a change could not be made without the Ministry of Culture's permission, and the proposed museum use was deemed unsuitable. Although the Municipality attempted to establish a library in the tower in 1998, the proposal was rejected by the Conservation Board for Immovable Cultural and Natural Assets.

Following an authorization decision issued by the Istanbul No. 1 Conservation Board for Cultural and Natural Assets on 7 May 1999, restoration of the exterior was completed by Peker İnşaat, which had won the 1996 tender, in June 2000. The tower reopened on 13 November 2000. Pekerler İnşaat also won the tender issued by the Istanbul Metropolitan Municipality in 2000 for the interior restoration. However, the Municipality's proposed interior restoration project, which envisaged converting the tower into a museum, was rejected by the Board because the Ministry of Culture, which was responsible for granting permission to establish a museum, had not issued the necessary authorization. Later that year, a new project featuring an exhibition hall, a souvenir shop, and a café was prepared and submitted to the Board. In February 2004, the Board approved a proposal to arrange the top two floors as a Turkish coffeehouse and the remaining floors for souvenir shops and other tourist facilities.

A view of the restaurant on the tower's eighth floor before 2020, during the period when it was operated by BELTUR (April 2015)

Under a Council of Ministers decision published in the T.C. Resmî Gazete on 28 March 2006, Galata Tower and Its Surroundings was designated a "renewal area." A further Council of Ministers decision published in the T.C. Resmî Gazete on 6 July 2006 stipulated that the Beyoğlu Municipality would expropriate the area as part of the renewal-area project. Although the area lay within parts of Beyoğlu designated an urban conservation area by a decision of the Istanbul No. 1 Conservation Board for Cultural and Natural Assets dated 7 July 1993, it was one of seven areas outside the planning area.

Legal efforts to evict the tower's operators, ongoing since 1996, came to an end after the Istanbul Metropolitan Municipality declined to renew the lease with the Kardeşler family, who operated the tower. On 16 April 2013, operation of the tower was transferred to BELTUR, a company affiliated with the Municipality. Following renovations to the top two floors carried out by the Municipality, the eighth floor became a restaurant and the seventh a café.

At the 37th session of the World Heritage Committee, a decision adopted on 21 June 2013 included the Galata Tower among the architectural works in the series entitled "Trade Posts and Fortifications on Genoese Trade Routes from the Mediterranean to the Black Sea" on UNESCO's Tentative World Heritage List for Turkey.

==== General Directorate of Foundations period and the 2020 restoration ====
The tower's present-day nighttime illumination (February 2021)

In a letter dated 17 April 2019, the Directorate General of Foundations, invoking Article 30 of the Foundations Law, applied for ownership of the tower to be transferred to it on behalf of the Kule-i Zemin Foundation. As of 13 May 2019, ownership of the tower was transferred to the General Directorate of Foundations on behalf of the Kule-i Zemin Foundation, while the Municipality remained a tenant. Legal action initiated by the Istanbul Metropolitan Municipality against the transfer was unsuccessful, and the lease agreement issued to BELTUR expired on 31 December 2019.

On 18 January 2020, Minister of Culture and Tourism Mehmet Nuri Ersoy announced that expropriation work would be carried out around the tower and a public square would be created as part of the tourism, culture, and arts project known as the "Beyoğlu Culture Route," which included the Galata Tower. In April 2020, the process of evicting the Istanbul Metropolitan Municipality from the tower began. The Municipality's legal challenge was unsuccessful, and as of 16 May 2020, ownership of the tower passed to the Istanbul Regional Directorate of Foundations No. 1 on behalf of the Kule-i Zemin Foundation.

ES Yapı, which won the tender for the restoration work, began work on 30 June 2020. All elements and decorations added to the interior during the work of the 1960s and afterward were removed, and restoration and renovation work was carried out on both the interior and exterior. The tower was redesigned as an exhibition center and museum and reopened on 6 October 2020, the anniversary of the Liberation of Istanbul, under the name Galata Tower Museum.

As part of the work, a ticket booth designed to resemble the nostalgic Taksim–Tünel tramcars of the Taksim–Tünel tram line was installed in the square outside the tower. The ground floor was arranged as a ticket-control and security area, with the entrance to the elevator reaching the sixth floor also located there. The first floor became a museum shop. The second floor was arranged as a simulation area featuring a screen showing an animation of Hezârfen Ahmed Çelebi gliding from the Galata Tower, as well as an exhibition area covering the period when the tower was used as an observatory. The third floor was renovated as a permanent exhibition space for photographs from the Turkish War of Independence, the fourth for information and artifacts relating to the Galata Tower and its walls, and the fifth for exhibits concerning the Galata Tower and Istanbul. On the seventh floor, reached after the sixth-floor transitional area, a temporary exhibition space was created with a scale model depicting part of Istanbul and viewing telescopes positioned by the windows. The eighth floor was arranged as an observation terrace.

Restoration work on the tower's roof began on 1 November 2023, carried out by Galata Restorasyon.

== Location and architecture ==
=== Location, exterior architecture, and structure ===
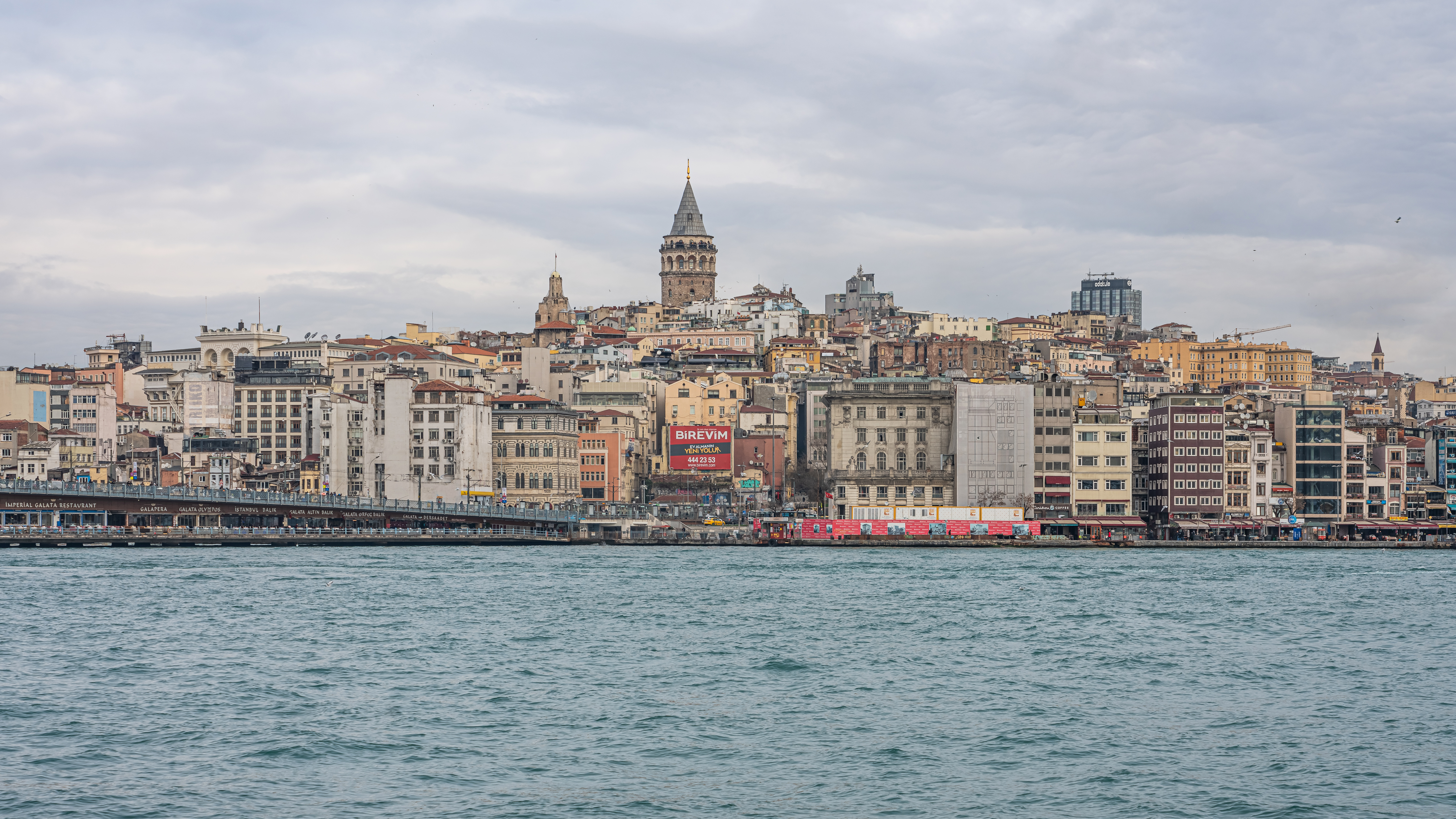
Views of the tower and its surroundings from the Golden Horn (top, February 2020) and from the air (July 2011)

The Galata Tower is building number 2 on Büyük Hendek Street, located in the Bereketzade neighbourhood of the Beyoğlu district of Istanbul. It stands in the Galata neighbourhood, which gave it its name, on a hill at an elevation of 35 m. The tower is a cylindrical masonry structure in the Romanesque style, with a height of 62.59 m from ground level to the tip of its roof. Situated on rocky, clay-rich schist ground, the building has a solid stone foundation. The entrance door, located above ground level on the southern axis, is reached by marble staircases on either side. Above the tower's marble entrance door, which has jambs in the Empire style, is an inscription commemorating the repair and restoration works carried out in 1831–1832. The inscription bears a poem by Poet Pertev. The text, carved into the marble in relief by Nuri Dede and written in the jali style of ta'liq calligraphy, consists of 16 verses arranged in four lines across four panels, framed by cartouches with serrated borders. Three elliptical cartouches above the text read, respectively, "Ya Hafiz", "Maşallah", and "Ya Rafi". The tughra of Mahmud II, which had previously appeared on the inscription, was chiselled away after the proclamation of the republic. On the southern-facing facade, at ground-floor level, a plaque prepared by Emin Barın was installed in 1953, following an initiative by the Istanbul Conquest Society, to mark the 500th anniversary of the Fall of Constantinople. The plaque bears the following text in capital letters:

On the morning of Tuesday, 29 May 1453, the Genoese colony of Galata presented its keys to Fatih Sultan Mehmed, and the surrender of Galata was completed on Friday, 1 June.
Istanbul Conquest Society. 1953
EB (Note: The initials of Emin Barın, who prepared the text, forming his signature.)

In the square outside the tower is a ticket booth designed in the style of the Taksim–Tünel nostalgic tram. Adjacent to the surviving sections of the walls surrounding the tower, with its front facing the tower square, stands the Bereketzade Fountain, which was dismantled from its former location and moved here in 1957.

The ground floor has an area of 208 m², an internal diameter of 8.95 m, and an external diameter of 16.45 m. The wall thickness, which is 3.75 m up to the fourth floor, decreases to 3 m from that floor upward because the tower was built with an outward slope. Although a 5 m section of the external walls at entrance-door level loses its circular shape, this irregularity diminishes up to the first cornice, after which the building resumes its circular form. At a height of 4.2 m, on the entrance axis, there is a channel opening measuring 72 × 150 cm, topped by a brick vault. Anadol suggests that these channels may once have extended outside the tower and continued beneath the walls, providing connections between the fortifications.

A photograph of the tower showing the surrounding walls and the brick bands on its exterior (January 2015)

The interior architecture of the tower and the materials used in its walls remain consistent up to the fourth floor. Irregular embrasures in the floor plans and the flattened profile of the southern facade continue uninterrupted from the ground floor to the fourth floor. Above this level, the embrasures become regular and the shaft assumes a fully cylindrical shape. Two horizontal brick bands run around the tower's shaft, at elevations of 13.20 m (the beginning of the second floor) and 17.17 m (the beginning of the third floor). The section below the first band consists of roughly dressed, square-shaped stone blocks of various types, in irregular arrangements and in dark yellow, light brown, dark grey, and dark blue hues, with fragments of brick inserted between them. Above this band, the stones are comparatively smaller, more finely dressed, generally horizontally rectangular, and arranged more regularly; there are no brick fragments between the stones. Limestone is the most commonly used stone in this section. Yellow and brown tones are almost entirely absent, while dark grey and bluish colours remain prevalent.

Based on these observations, Sağlam states that "it is not possible to say that either the first band or the second band alone represents the level separating the Genoese and Ottoman periods". He argues that the collapse caused by the 1509 earthquake was not level, as "previous researchers had assumed", but irregular, with the inner section reaching a higher level. Based on the change in stonework above the first band, he concludes that damage and material loss to the exterior extended as far as the second floor, while the thick-walled section of the shaft and its internal vaulted gallery were preserved "to a large extent" up to the fourth floor. Damage to the exterior from the second floor upward was also repaired. From the fourth floor onward, the entire level was flattened, marking the beginning of a new section with thinner walls and a different staircase system. He further suggests that the brick bands served as hatıl (bonding courses), helping distribute weight evenly between the repaired sections and the original shaft walls.

On the southern-facing section of the second brick band is an Ottoman-style decorative motif made of bricks. Diagonal cracks at the joints in this section have created a distinct pattern. According to Sağlam, this indicates that "the section assumed to date from the Genoese period actually contains at least two phases, rather than just one".

The top of the tower is covered by a conical, lead-clad reinforced-concrete roof. The roof has four windows, each facing one of the cardinal directions, with their upper limits reaching an elevation of 50.29 m. At the summit is a gold-plated bronze finial, measuring 7.41 m according to Anadol and 6.75 m according to Şevket Usta, who manufactured it. A 50 cm lantern is installed at the top of the finial. It has a flashing red light that makes the tower visible and also serves as a lightning rod.

Entrance staircase

The surrounding Bereketzade Fountain (March 2020)

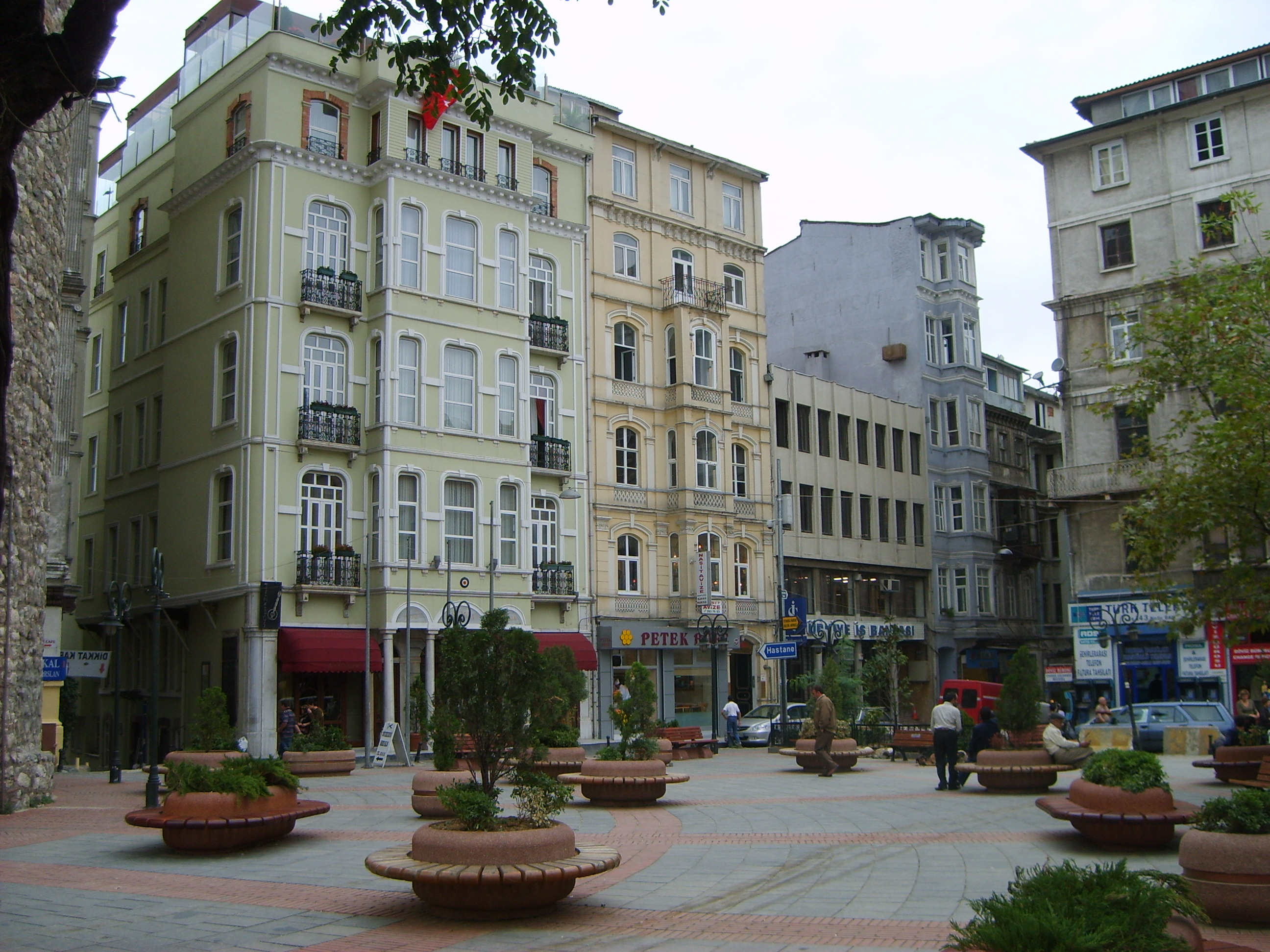
A view of the surroundings (August 2008)

The inscription above the entrance door, added during the 1831–1832 restoration

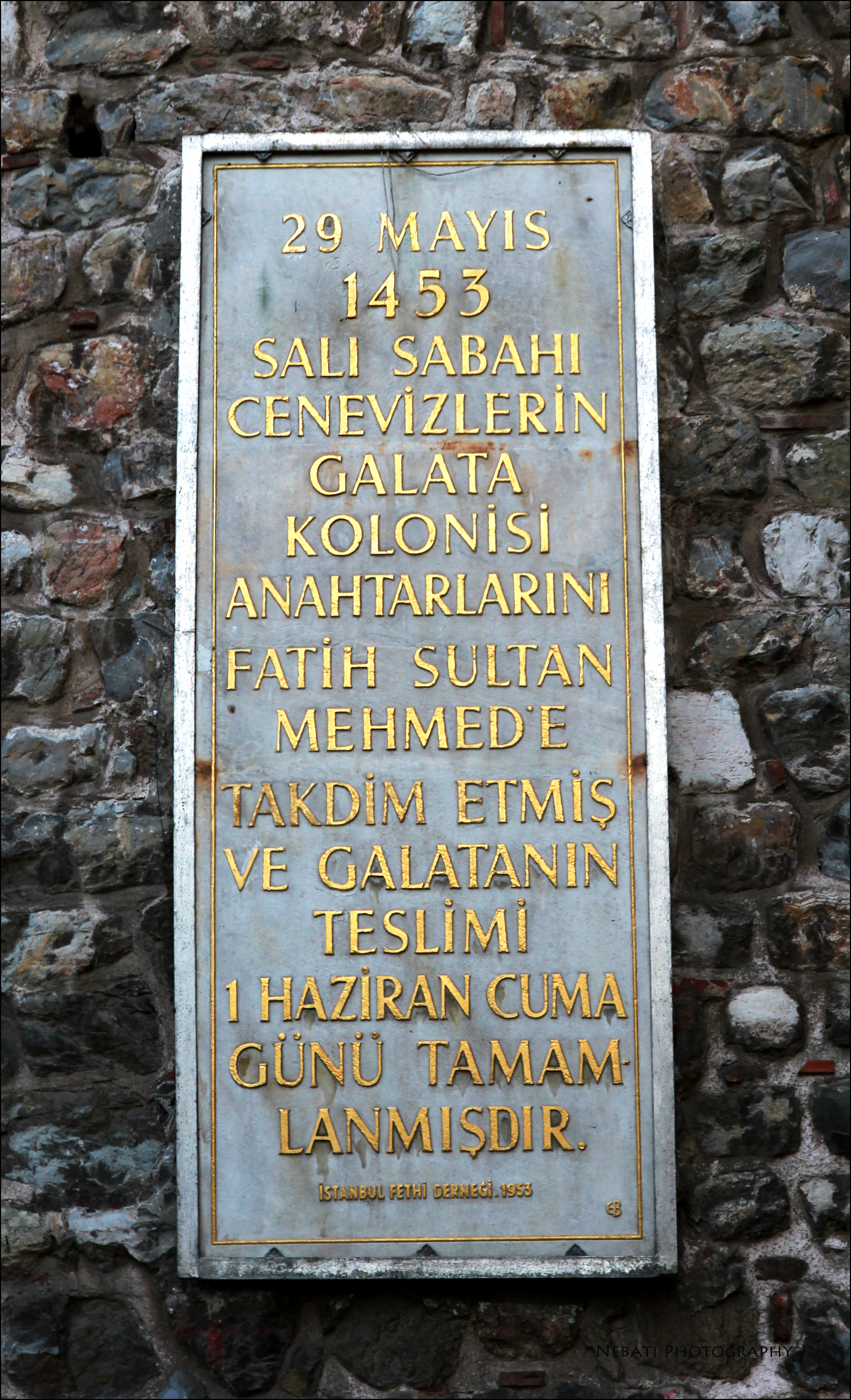
The plaque installed to mark the 500th anniversary of the Fall of Constantinople

=== Interior architecture ===
A view of the tower's staircase (June 2021)

The building has eleven floors in total, including a basement, a ground floor, and a mezzanine. The first four floors are connected by a gallery passage with stone stairs protected by wood coated in epoxy. The stairs are set directly into the shaft walls, and the passage is covered by brick vaults. During excavation work carried out as part of the restoration in the 1960s, no floor surface was found down to an elevation of −4.3 m. The area was excavated to reinforce the foundations, creating a basement at −3.8 m. From here, a reinforced-concrete staircase concealed beneath a circular floor panel leads to the ground floor. The staircase connecting the ground floor to the upper floors has 22 steps and is located 42 cm from the tower's inner wall. It is 80 cm wide and 150 cm high. On the entrance floor, whose ceiling is covered with hexagonal natural stone, two lifts, each accommodating eight people, are positioned opposite the entrance door along its axis, against the wall. They extend to the sixth floor. The lifts use video-wall technology to display footage filmed from the tower on screens installed on their walls and ceilings. Above the reinforced-concrete mezzanine, which stands at an elevation of 4.45 m and has balustrades with Empire-style profiles, is the first floor, at 8.97 m. The first-floor window openings measure 20 × 45 cm on the exterior and 200 × 180 cm on the interior. The second floor, at 13.20 m, shares the same architectural characteristics as the first floor, except that its internal diameter decreases to 8.85 m.

A view from the fifth floor (January 2021)

Within the niches in the third-floor walls, at an elevation of 17.17 m, are chimneys that Anadol considered "similar" to those of Zağanos Pasha Tower at Rumeli Fortress. The fourth floor, at 20.80 m, contains 14 rectangular windows. Because the brickwork gallery reduces the thickness of the shaft wall, it is positioned only on the southern side, the safer direction facing the colonial settlement. This arrangement ensures that the wall remains at its full thickness on the side most exposed to potential attacks from outside. As a result of this reduction in wall thickness, the internal diameter increases to 10.4 m. The average dimensions of the bricks used in the vaulted galleries of the first four floors resemble those of bricks found in other fourteenth-century fortifications in Galata and in late Byzantine structures elsewhere in the city. Sağlam considers the use of locally sourced materials in the tower's construction "a reasonable possibility". At this floor, the number of windows increases to seven.

A view from the seventh floor (January 2021)

The fifth floor begins at an elevation of 24.35 m and has 14 windows. Seven of these, installed for firing cannons, are circular and 35 cm in diameter; the other seven measure 115 × 180 cm and have pointed arches. All the windows on this floor are set into niches within masonry piers whose arches are constructed of brick. The sixth floor, at 27.90 m, is the last of the wooden half-storeys. It has 14 pointed-arch windows similar to those on the floor below, but smaller. Above this is the seventh-floor lookout pavilion, beginning at an elevation of 32.60 m. The sixth, seventh, and eighth floors are connected by steel staircases. The 14 windows on the seventh floor are formed by 13 masonry piers, each measuring 120 × 225 cm in cross-section, spaced 150 cm apart and connected by arches. The eighth floor, at an elevation of 40.04 m, has an internal width of 12.40 m and extends up to an elevation of 50.5 m. Its 14 windows are formed by piers measuring 110 × 100 cm in cross-section, spaced 170 cm apart and connected by arches. These piers are aligned with those on the seventh floor. Outside the eighth floor is a terrace 1.20 m wide, created by the difference in cross-section between the two floors. Each of the 14 masonry posts positioned along the axes of the interior piers supports a stone sphere 35 cm in diameter, secured with anchors as a precaution against falling. The 110 cm-high iron railings between the posts feature Empire-style ornamentation.

Following the 2020 restoration, the interior walls and ceilings were coated with plaster. Exhibits related to the tower are displayed on the second floor, which serves as a museum shop, and on the third, fourth, fifth, and seventh floors, which serve as exhibition spaces and a museum. On the seventh floor, there is a 1:2,500-scale model depicting part of Istanbul, along with viewing telescopes positioned in front of the windows. Benches are provided on the eighth floor, which is used as an observation terrace.

A view from the seventh floor (October 2021)

Interior of the lifts, showing video footage displayed on the wall and ceiling screens using video-wall technology

View of the lift entrance on the ground floor (January 2021)

A view of the museum section

The ground-floor lift entrance

One of the windows on the fifth floor

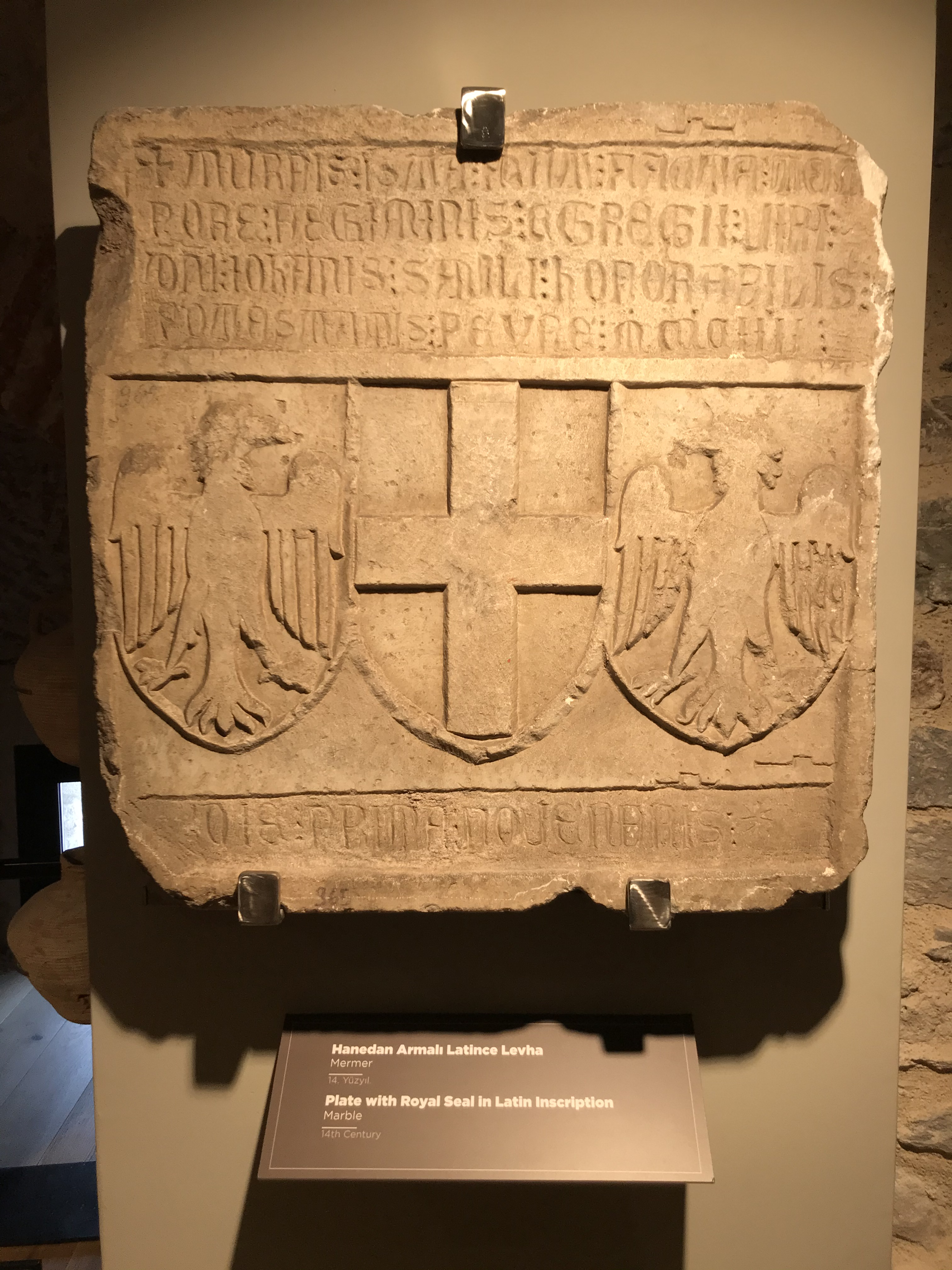
An inscription taken from the Galata Walls and displayed on the fourth floor

An inscription taken from the Galata Walls and displayed on the fourth floor

Some of the exhibits displayed in the tower

=== Architectural differences in earlier periods ===
==== 1348–1509 ====
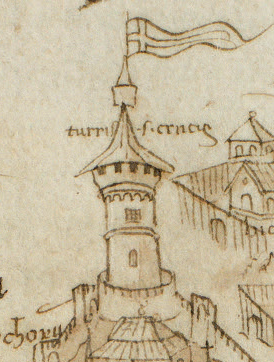
Depictions in copies of Liber insularum Archipelagi held by the Biblioteca Marciana (left, 1420s–1430s) and the University and State Library Düsseldorf (1485–1490), considered the closest representations of the tower during the Genoese period

When construction was completed, the tower served as the principal tower of the Galata Walls, of which it formed a part. In front of the tower was a barbican that projected in a semicircle from the straight line of the walls and adjoined the tower on both sides. Because the outer side of the walls was surrounded by a moat, the space between the tower and the barbican formed a courtyard. Some remains of this structure survive today. During the Genoese period, a cross stood atop the tower. Traces also indicate that the tower had a wooden bridge, now lost, that could be removed when necessary and provided passage between the city and the area outside the moats.

In the various surviving versions of Cristoforo Buondelmonti's Liber insularum Archipelagi, now held in different archives, the tower is depicted in several different ways, with inconsistencies among the illustrations. The cylindrical depictions are considered the closest to the original. On a map of Constantinople in the copy held by the Biblioteca Marciana, dated to around the 1420s–1430s, the tower is shown as taller than the other towers, with a conical roof, a cylindrical body, and an upper storey projecting outward beneath a series of blind arches. In a map in the copy of the same work dated to 1485–1490 and held by the University and State Library Düsseldorf, a Genoese flag appears at the top of the tower. Comparing the two depictions, Sağlam notes that in the first, the tower's "narrow and relatively tall" conical roof is surrounded by a battlemented parapet, whereas in the second, the roof is "much flatter and wider", with its eaves extending beyond the battlements. Sağlam also points out that the second copy shows "a single band dividing the tower's body wall horizontally right through the middle, as if marking a repair", suggesting, as a hypothesis, that this may corroborate the damage and repairs carried out in 1453.

Following the Ottoman conquest of the area in 1453, the tower suffered damage that, according to anonymous Ottoman sources cited by Ahmed Vefik Pasha, reduced its height by approximately 7.5 m. After an imperial decree concerning Pera was issued, the destruction was halted, the tower was raised again, and the cross at its summit was replaced with an Ottoman flag.

Some depictions of the tower from its early period in various copies of Cristoforo Buondelmonti's Liber insularum Archipelagi (from left to right): the copy held by the National Maritime Museum and dated to the 1420s; the copy held by the Vatican Library and dated to 1465; the copy held by the National Library of France and dated to 1465–1475; the copy held by the National Central Library of Florence and dated to around 1470; the copy held by the Walters Art Museum and dated to around 1475; the copy held by the Bodleian Library and dated to the fifteenth century; and the version in Henricus Martellus Germanus's Insularium Illustratum, dated to 1495.

==== 1509–1794 ====
Following the 1509 Constantinople earthquake, the tower sustained damage. Repairs were completed in mid-1510, and the tower was raised again. The two brick bands around the tower's shaft, at elevations of 13.20 m (the beginning of the second floor) and 17.17 m (the beginning of the third floor), are considered evidence of alterations made after the earthquake. Köksal Anadol and Ersin Arıoğlu state that these bands indicate that the tower was rebuilt from these levels upward. Semavi Eyice, on the other hand, notes that the brick motifs have "the typical character of Ottoman ornamentation". He argues that the relatively "plain" first band indicates a superficial repair to the exterior of the tower, while the section above the second band was built entirely during the Ottoman period. In a miniature depicting the Galata Tower in a work by Matrakçı Nasuh dated to 1537, the lookout pavilion and the storey above it are shown in a 1:2 proportion, with approximately eight arched openings on the pavilion floor.

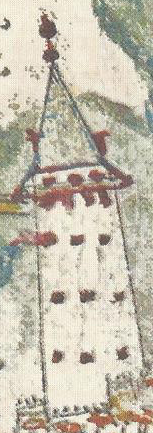
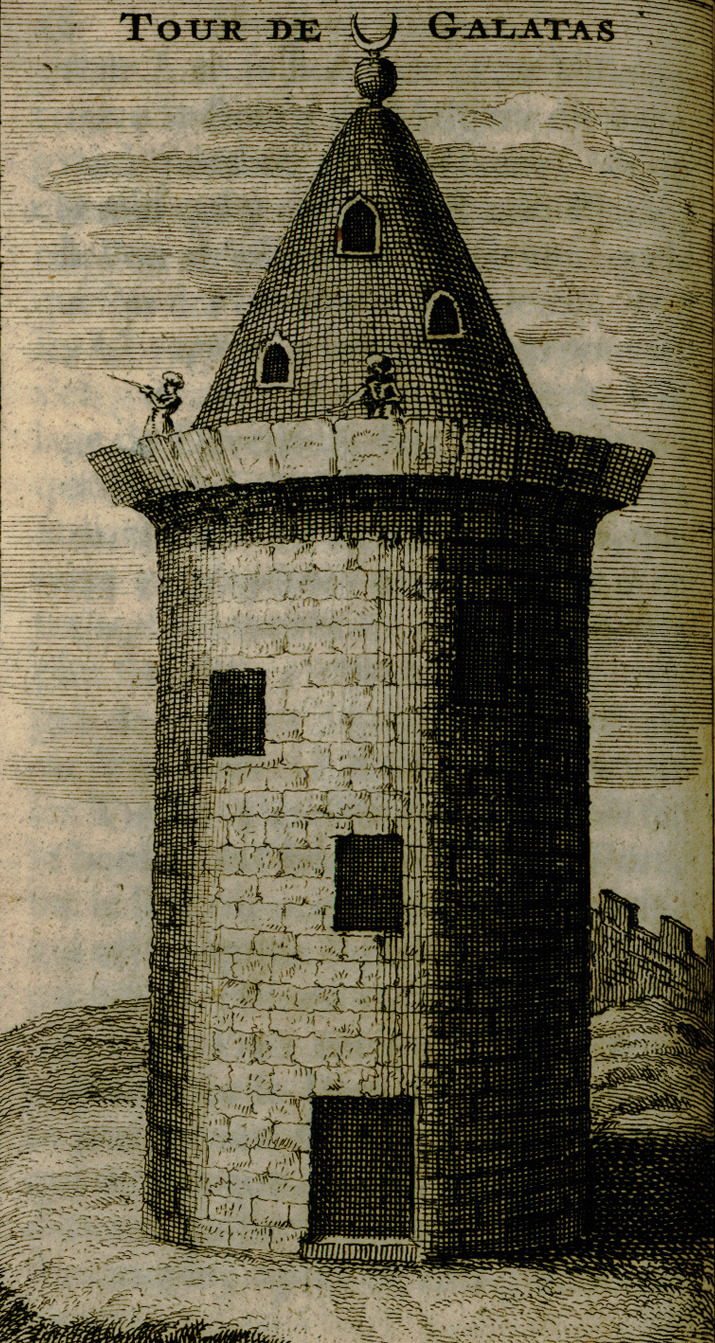
Some depictions of the tower from 1509 to 1794 (from left to right): a miniature in Matrakçı Nasuh's work published in 1537; a sixteenth-century engraving by Giovanni Andrea Vavassore; a miniature by Mustafa bin Mehmed Cündî in a 1629 copy of Piri Reis's Kitab-ı Bahriye; an engraving by Jaspar Isaac dated to 1650–1659; and an engraving by Paul Lucas dated to 1720.

==== 1509–1965 ====
A fire on 27 July 1794 damaged the tower's roof and upper floors. The tower's height was reduced by approximately 1.9 m, and the walls in this section were rebuilt. As part of these works, an Empire-style pavilion with glazed projections approximately 1.5 m long was constructed on each side of the top floor.

Following the damage caused by a fire on 2–3 August 1831, repairs were carried out and the design of the tower's upper section was altered. The four projecting structures were replaced by a hall with 14 semicircular-arched windows in its walls. In front of the smaller-diameter, windowed storey above it, an iron-railed balcony was added around the building. A staircase with 40 steps in the centre of the hall provided access to the upper floor. The second floor, which contained the 14 windows, was covered by a conical lead roof with four windows installed above it.

After the roof was blown off during a storm in 1875, two octagonal timber-framed masonry storeys were built above the top floor, with a terrace at an elevation of 51.65 m. A flagpole was erected on top of these storeys. The spiral staircase connecting the two floors was removed and replaced with a straight wooden staircase inclined at 45 degrees to reach the upper floor. In March 1930, a time ball was installed at the top of the tower.

==== 1965–2020 ====
A view from the terrace before the 2020 restoration (December 2013)

During the restoration in 1965, the area around the tower was closed to traffic and reserved exclusively for pedestrians. It was also redesigned to accommodate several souvenir shops. The stairs leading into the tower and the terrace in front of the entrance were enclosed by iron railings between marble posts. The entrance door was renovated with detailing intended to be "close to the characteristics of the period". The wooden floors were replaced with reinforced-concrete floors and were generally covered with natural stone. The stone stair treads were also clad in natural stone, and the staircases were illuminated.

The wooden staircase in the centre of the seventh floor, which had been converted into a restaurant, was removed and replaced by steel staircases connecting the sixth, seventh, and eighth floors. These were fitted with wooden handrails and steps proportioned in the Empire style. The window frames and wall decorations on the floor were simplified to make more of the window glass visible. The tower's roof was rebuilt using a lead-clad reinforced-concrete system, retaining the conical design used between 1832 and 1876, although with a somewhat less pointed profile. A gold-plated bronze finial was installed on top. Cracks in the tower walls were repaired, and the load-bearing system was reinforced with reinforced-concrete elements. A relief depicting the miniature of Galata by Matrakçı Nasuh, created by Tankut Öktem and Haluk Tezonar, was installed above the ground-floor entrance to the lift.

== Symbolic significance and events ==
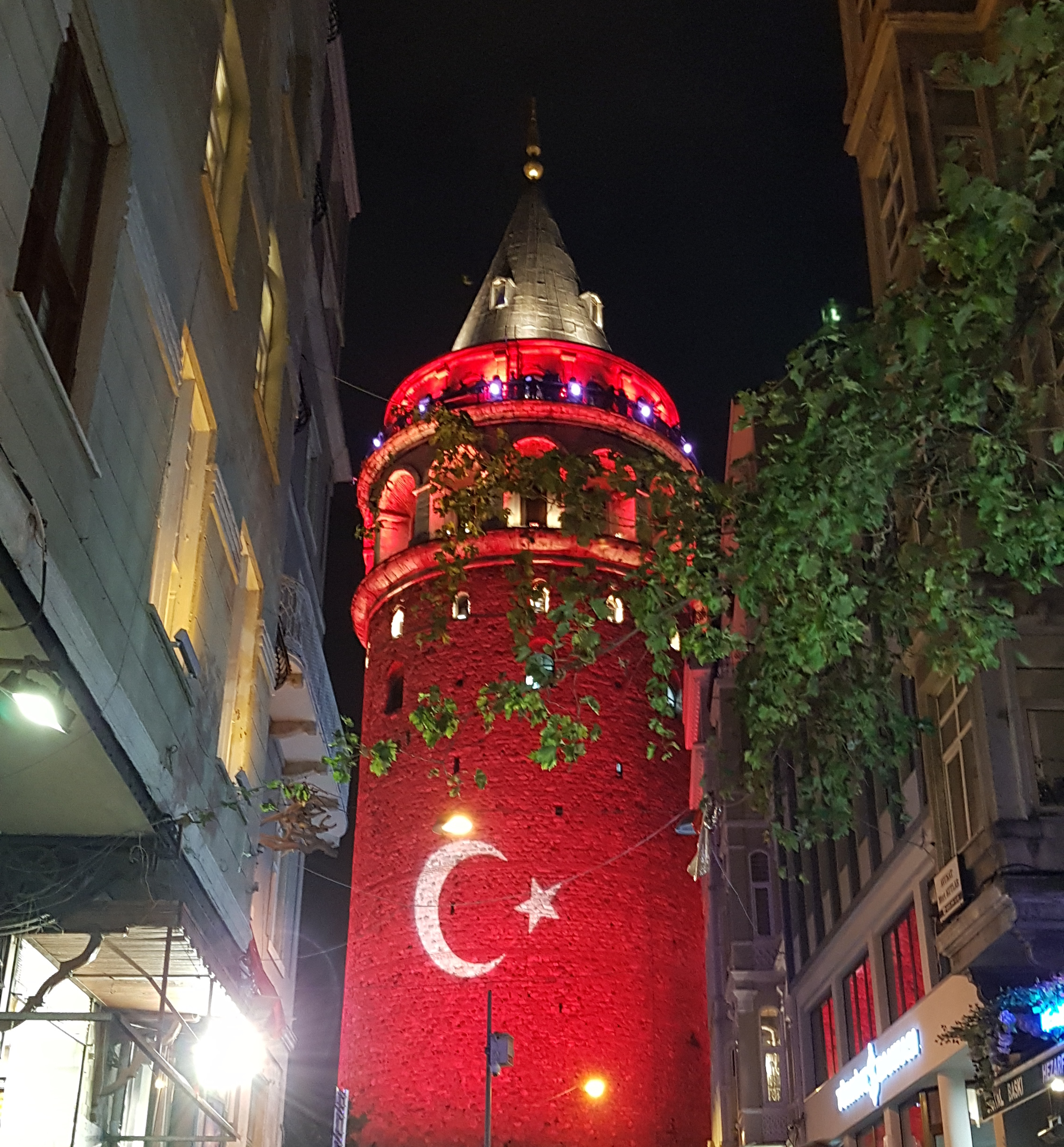
The tower illuminated in pink to raise awareness of breast cancer (top, 19 October 2019) and with the Turkish flag projected onto it to celebrate Republic Day (28 October 2019)

The tower is one of the symbolic landmarks of Beyoğlu and Istanbul. It is also a tourist attraction, both because of its symbolic significance for the city and because its summit offers views over the city centre. Over time, restaurants, cafés, and shops have opened in its surroundings as a result of this popularity.

The tower is periodically illuminated in different colours on days commemorating events, raising awareness, or celebrating particular occasions. Images are also projected onto its shaft using video mapping technology, and events are sometimes held in the surrounding square on these occasions. Such events include the International Day for the Elimination of Violence against Women, World Cancer Day, World Diabetes Day, Purple Day, Green Crescent Week, Valentine's Day, New Year's Eve, and Turkey's official national holidays, including National Sovereignty and Children's Day (23 April), Commemoration of Atatürk, Youth and Sports Day (19 May), Victory Day (30 August), and Republic Day (29 October). Other occasions include the anniversary of the Fall of Constantinople, and the anniversary of the founding of the General Directorate of Security. The tower's lighting has also been switched off temporarily in observance of Earth Hour, to raise awareness of breast cancer, to express opposition to the 2016 Turkish coup attempt, to reference the flowering season of the Judas tree, one of the city's symbols, to promote the Istanbul Youth Festival, and to celebrate Beşiktaş winning the Süper Lig.

In addition to these activities, the tower and its surroundings have hosted a range of events and protests, including an occupation calling for the release of members of the Revolutionary People's Liberation Party/Front who were in custody, a body painting project resembling the tower to raise awareness of schizophrenia, a protest by members of the People's Front against Operation Return to Life, an anti-nuclear-energy protest by Greenpeace members, another anti-nuclear protest as part of SOCIAL/IST 2012 Social Media Day, a protest by members of the Electricity, Gas, Water and Dam Workers' Union, affiliated with the Confederation of Progressive Trade Unions of Turkey, against their dismissals, a protest against the opening of a tea garden in the square where the tower stands, and the symbolic placement of a blue tie on the tower to raise awareness of prostate cancer.

== Cultural impact ==
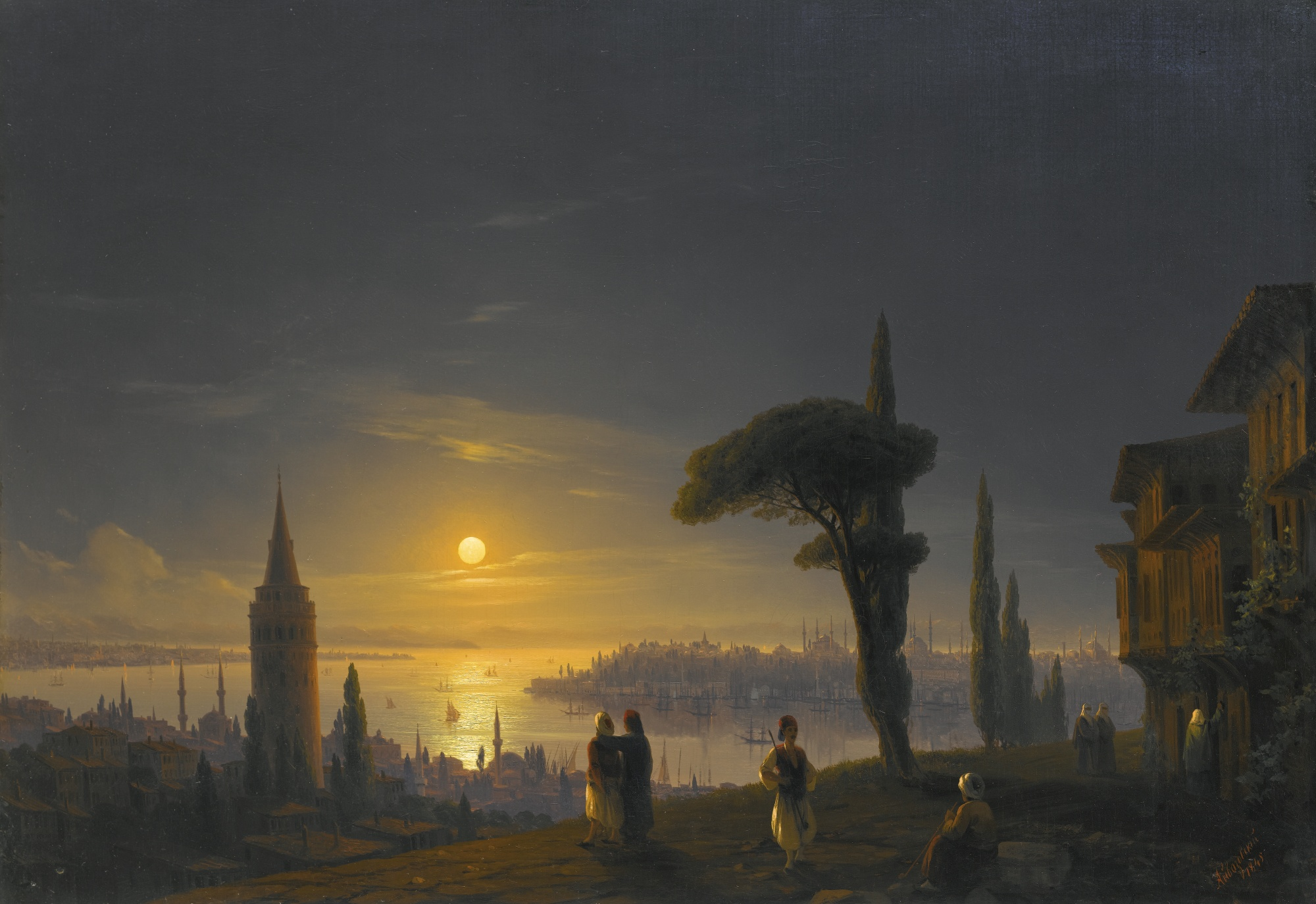
Galata Tower in Moonlight, Ivan Aivazovsky (1845)

Certain works, particularly those in Turkish literature, contain references to the tower and descriptions influenced by it. In the following couplet, which means, "[O my beloved!] Your lovers are merely displaying flags to you; do not think that they have enlisted as daredevil soldiers like Rezmî," Rezmî alludes to the tower's function of signaling fires. Drawing on the motif of burning with love for the beloved, he explains that although other lovers wave flags to indicate that they are "burning" with passion, he himself has enlisted as a genuine lover in the ranks of the serdengeçti (literally, one who has surrendered his head, or a soldier willing to risk his life):

Do not think that your lovers display banners to you
Like warriors in battle, they have been inscribed as those who have surrendered their heads

The same situation is referenced in a couplet by Gelibolulu Mustafa Ali:

The sparks of my nocturnal sigh revealed a procession from the heights
How many banners unfurled, as flames blazed in glorious orange above

In the section concerning Galata Tower in Cemal Süreya's poem "Burkulmuş Altın Hâli Güneşin" ("The Twisted Golden State of the Sun"), nostalgia for the Byzantine and Roman periods is expressed through irony employing the literary device of allusion:

And Galata Tower (its hat flew off in 1514, during Byzantine times, and it was circumcised by the Turks in 1967), having gathered the buildings around itself, is looking for ways to comfortably withstand an approaching storm, holding meetings: at the head of its people and in the foremost position, like Pharaoh preparing to knock on the gates of hell...

A 1950 Turkish postage stamp depicting Hezârfen Ahmed Çelebi gliding from Galata Tower, issued in commemoration of the International Civil Aviation Organization Congress that began on 17 October 1950

The tower is also mentioned in Süreya's poem entitled "Rokoko". In Sezai Karakoç's poem "Kızkulesi'ne Gazel II", the poet describes the Maiden's Tower as a Muslim structure and Galata Tower as a Christian one. He states that the Maiden's Tower sends light to Galata Tower, dispelling the Genoese and Byzantine darkness surrounding it. Interpreting the former tower as a symbol of the East and the latter as a symbol of Western civilization, the poem suggests that the mystery and enchantment of the East will also influence the West:

The Maiden's Tower sends light to Galata Tower
It dispels the Genoese darkness
The Byzantine darkness every morning
With the Muslim lullaby it hears in the waters every evening
It engraves the spellbinding language into the depths of our souls
It spreads into the air an evening scented with walnut leaves from Samarkand
It is a green prayer for the greatest illumination

Ümit Yaşar Oğuzcan wrote the poem "Galata Kulesi" ("Galata Tower") following the death of his 15-year-old son Vedat, who died by suicide after jumping from the tower on 6 June 1973. In his book Constantinople, published in 1877, Edmondo De Amicis likened Galata to an "open fan" and the tower perched atop the hill to "the handle of this fan".

In the 2011 video game Assassin's Creed: Revelations, which is set partly in 16th-century Constantinople, the protagonist Ezio Auditore da Firenze climbs the exterior of Galata Tower and enters it during one section of the game. Galata Tower is also among the Great Buildings featured in the 2012 browser game Forge of Empires. The 1997 video game Byzantine: The Betrayal includes sections set in Galata Tower. A depiction of the tower appears on the Galata map in the 2017 video game Sabotaj.

Galata Tower is depicted in two paintings by Ivan Aivazovsky dating from 1845 and 1846, each showing a different view of the city. Galata and the tower are depicted in a painting by Garabet Yazmaciyan dated 1891, while his 1903 painting portrays a fire that broke out near the tower. İbrahim Safi also produced two paintings depicting the tower. Various depictions of the tower also appear in books by numerous writers describing their visits to the city.

The water tower in Niederlehme, designed after Galata Tower

The logos of the Beyoğlu Municipality and Istanbul Galata University feature depictions of the tower. Among the models displayed at Miniatürk in the district since the park opened in May 2003 is a model of Galata Tower. The model was renovated in March 2016. A model of the tower is also exhibited at Minimundus in the Austrian city of Klagenfurt. A model of the tower is among those exhibited at the Kepez Open-Air Museum, which opened in Konyaaltı, Antalya, in May 2004 and moved to Kepez in 2018.

Among the sand sculptures exhibited at the International Sand Sculpture Festival held at the CarrefourSA branch in Kozyatağı between July and September 2007 was a sculpture themed around Galata Tower and Hezârfen Ahmed Çelebi. In December 2010, the tower was among the Istanbul landmarks depicted on a ceramic mural called the Istanbul Panel, installed along Cumhuriyet Avenue between Sinanpaşa, Beşiktaş and Ortaköy, Beşiktaş. The tower's model was among the works exhibited at Worldminia, an exhibition held several times beginning at ANKAmall in January–February 2014. Hezârfen Ahmed Çelebi's flight in 1632, when he strapped wooden wings resembling those of an eagle to his back and glided from the top of Galata Tower to Doğancılar in Üsküdar, inspired various cultural works and studies.

The water tower in the town of Niederlehme, in the German state of Brandenburg, completed in 1902, was designed after Galata Tower.

Images or depictions of Galata Tower appeared on postage stamps issued in Turkey on 17 October 1950, in commemoration of the International Civil Aviation Organization Congress held in the city; on 6 January 1971, marking the 60th anniversary of the founding of the Turkish Air Force; on 1 September 1995, commemorating the 1996 World Philatelic Exhibition held in the city; on 3 July 2005, commemorating the 22nd World Congress of Architecture held in the city; on 28 October 2007, in connection with Balkanfila XIV; and on 7 January 2010, in commemoration of Istanbul's designation as a European Capital of Culture for 2010. The reverse sides of two coins in the Euro Series commemorative coin collection minted by the country's national mint also feature depictions of the tower: the silver coin numbered 2, dated 1999, and the gold coin numbered 8, dated 2002.

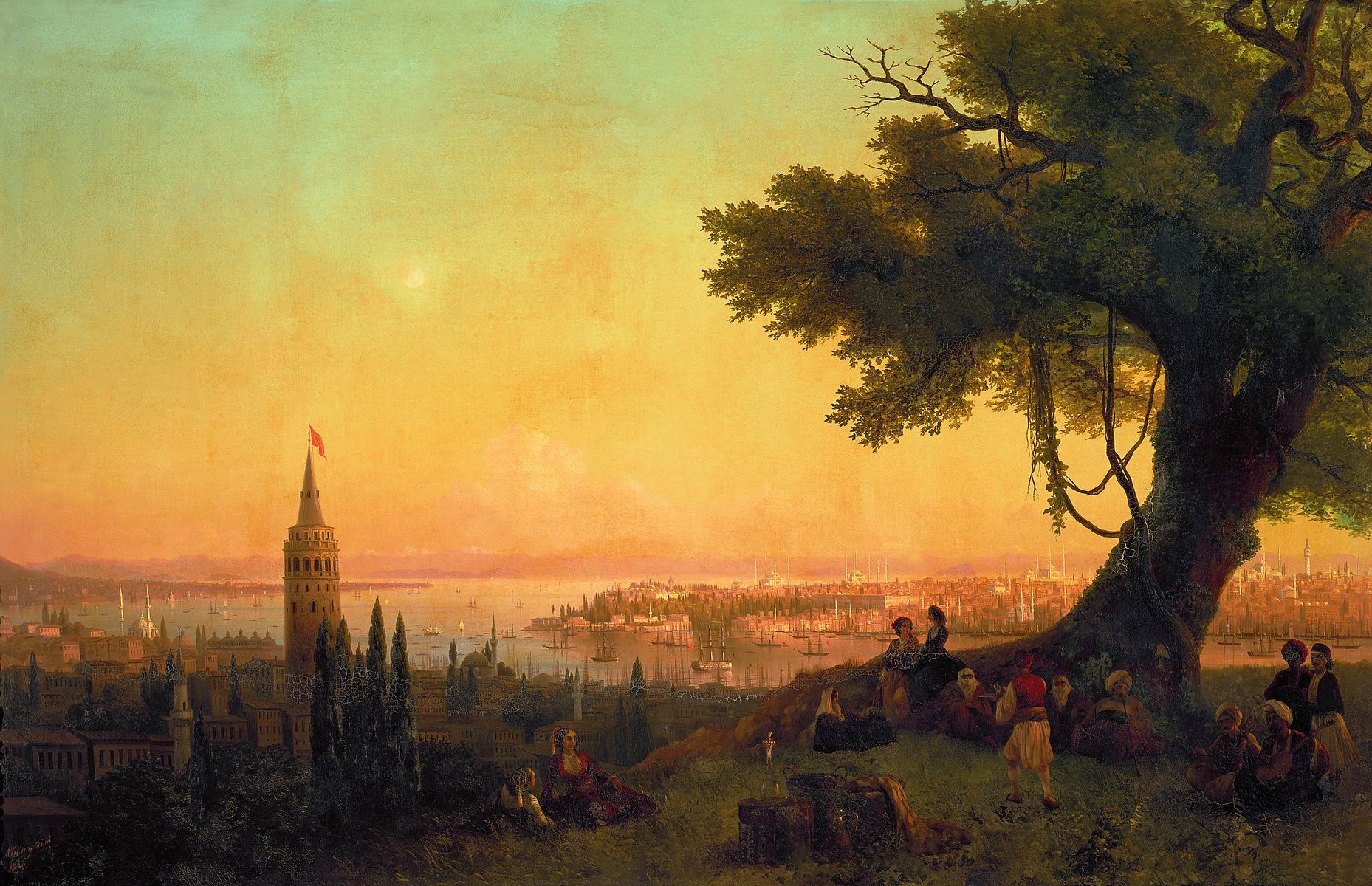
View of Constantinople in Evening Light, Ivan Aivazovsky (1846)

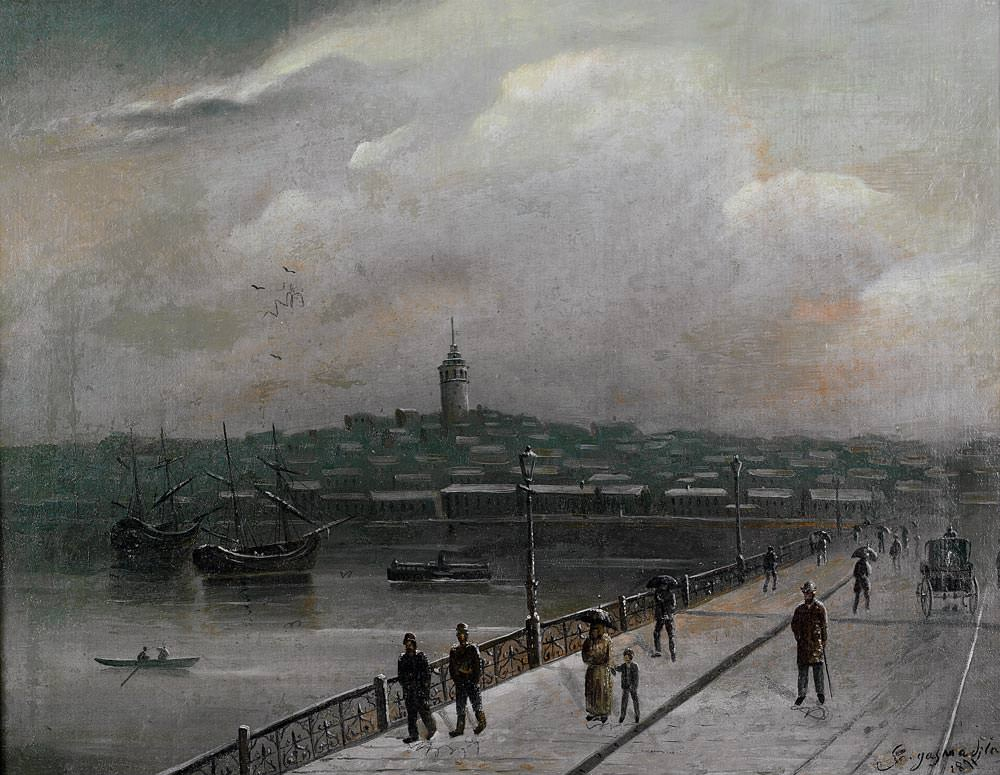
Garabet Yazmaciyan, Galata Kulesi (1891)

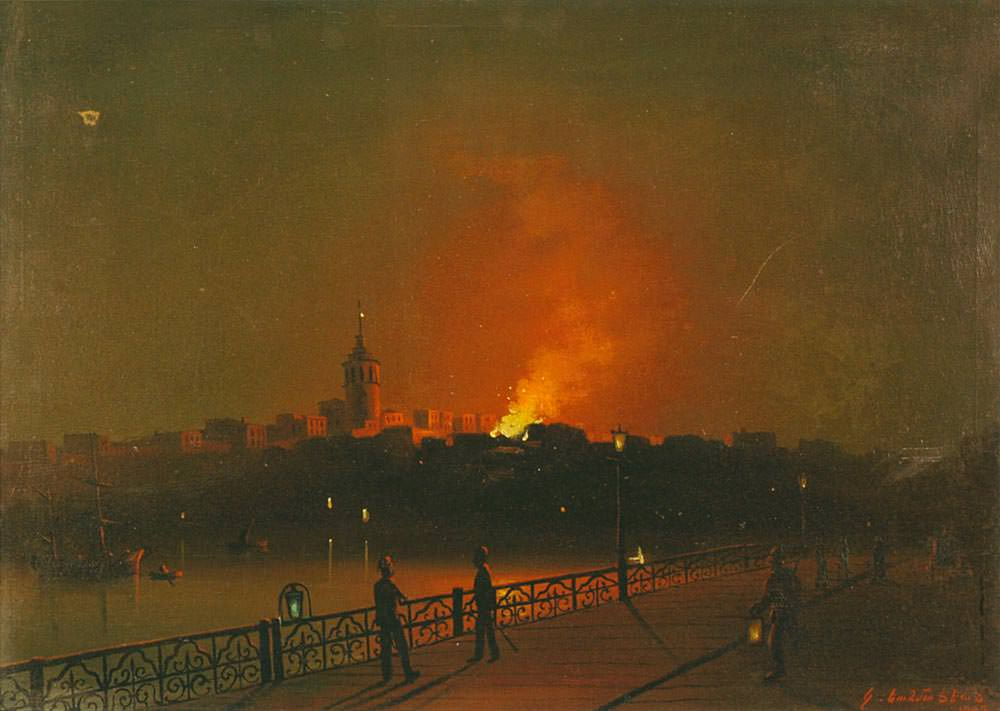
Garabet Yazmaciyan, Galata Yangını (1903)
