= Garabet Yazmaciyan =

Turkish Painter

Garabet Yazmaciyan Կարապետ Եազմաճեան
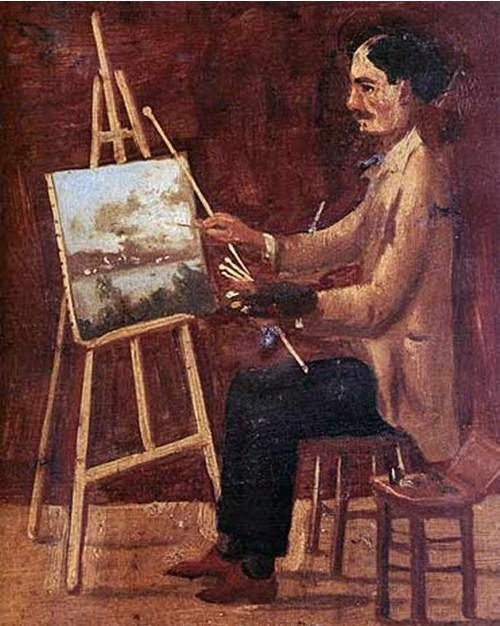
- Self-portrait of Garabet Yazmaciyan
- Born: 1868; Üsküdar, Constantinople, Ottoman Empire (modern-day Istanbul, Turkey)
- Died: 1929 (aged 60–61); Istanbul, Turkey
- Occupation: Painter

Garabet Yazmaciyan (Armenian: Կարապետ Եազմաճեան, 1868–1929) was a prominent Ottoman painter of Armenian descent.

== Style ==
Yazmacıyan used scenery, color harmonies, and subjects that are of very close resemblance to Mıgırdiç Civanyan (1848–1906). His brushstrokes however are a little more careless and slovenly. In order to be able to make a living from painting like Civanyan, Yazmacıyan had to produce quite quickly. Yazmaciyan also painted for the local Armenian churches. His paintings for the churches are more elaborate, attentive, and refined.

One of his works is the double-sided tin shop sign he painted for his own business. On one of the sides, the artist has depicted himself painting. On the rear of the sign one can see a still-life painting. This proclaimed to the potential customers that he was open to conduct business and receive orders of both still-life and portraits. In a way this shop sign is also proof that a painter in late 19th and early 20th century Istanbul was at the same time a tradesman. Similarly this fact suggests that paintings during that period were seen as objects. They were ordered and considered as goods in the Ottoman society and economy, especially among the non-Muslim minorities.

The Alluring Woman with Poison in her Mouth is also one of Yazmaciyan's more interesting works. This painting depicts a naked man standing and is wrapped around a half-snake half-human Basilisk that has long claws similar to nails. The Basilisk appears as though it is looking up to god; enraged at being unable to fulfill her desires. There is a stark contrast between the pink body of the man against the blue-black snake like creature with red tinsels. What is open to discussion however is the content of the red-white bohemian cup the man is holding and what it symbolizes.

== Paintings ==
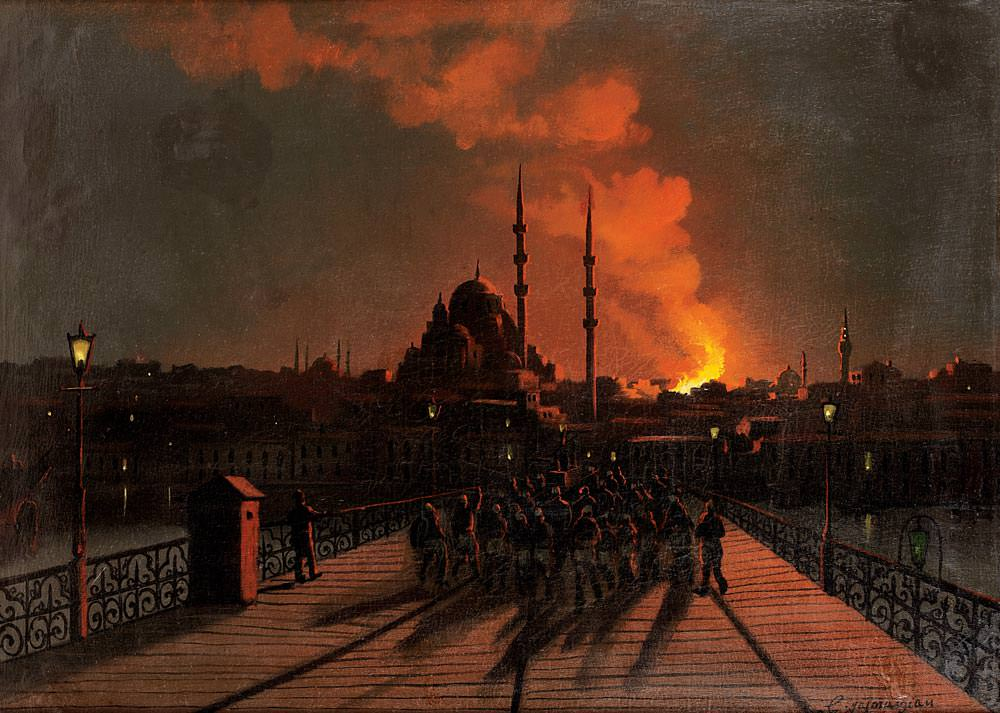
Beyazit'da Yangin (Fire at Beyazit)

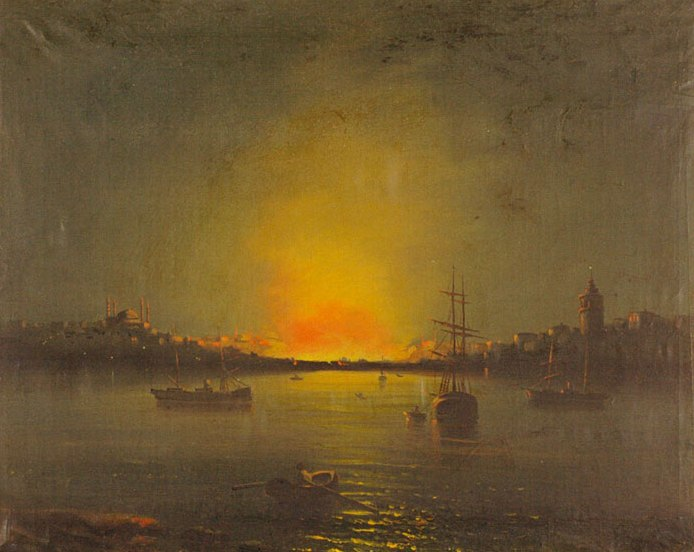
Galata Tower looking towards Haliç

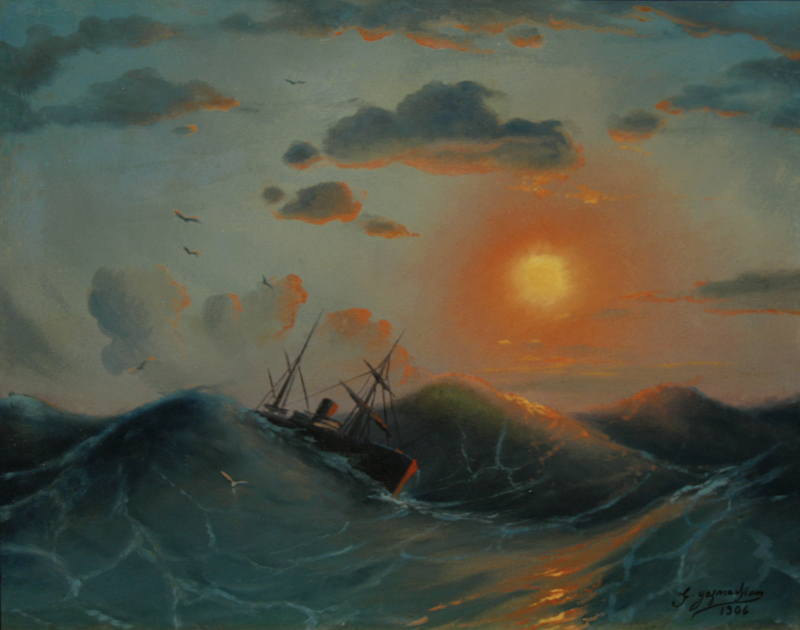
Storm at Sea (1906)

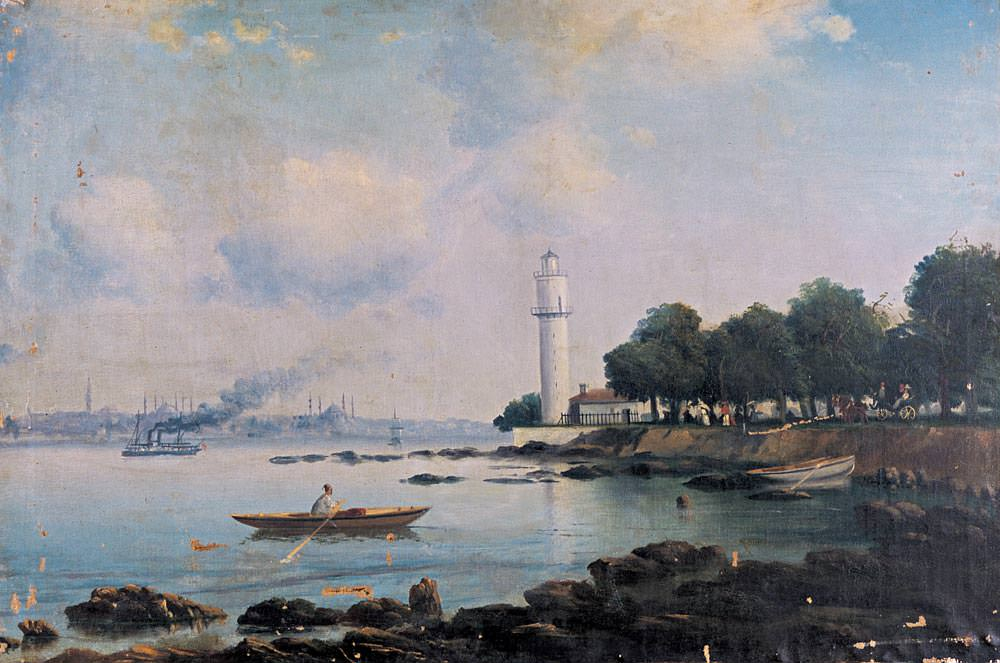
Lighthouse at Fener

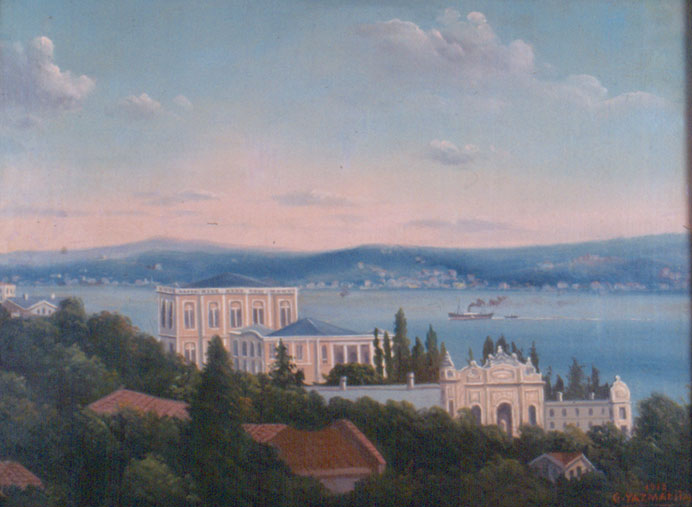
Bosphorus View (1912)

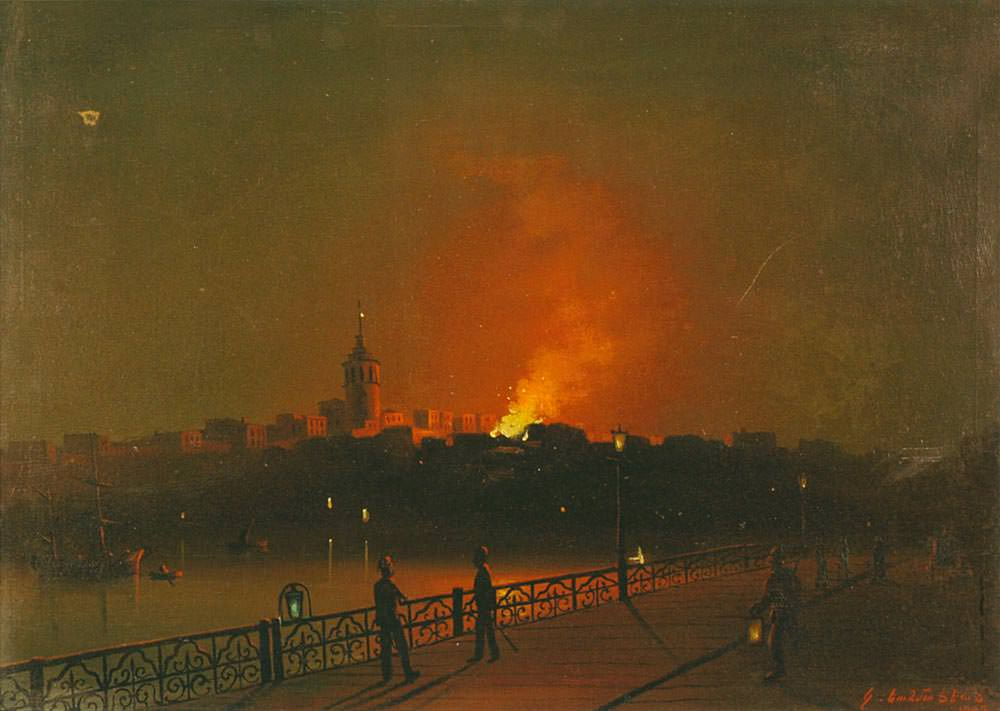
Galata Fire

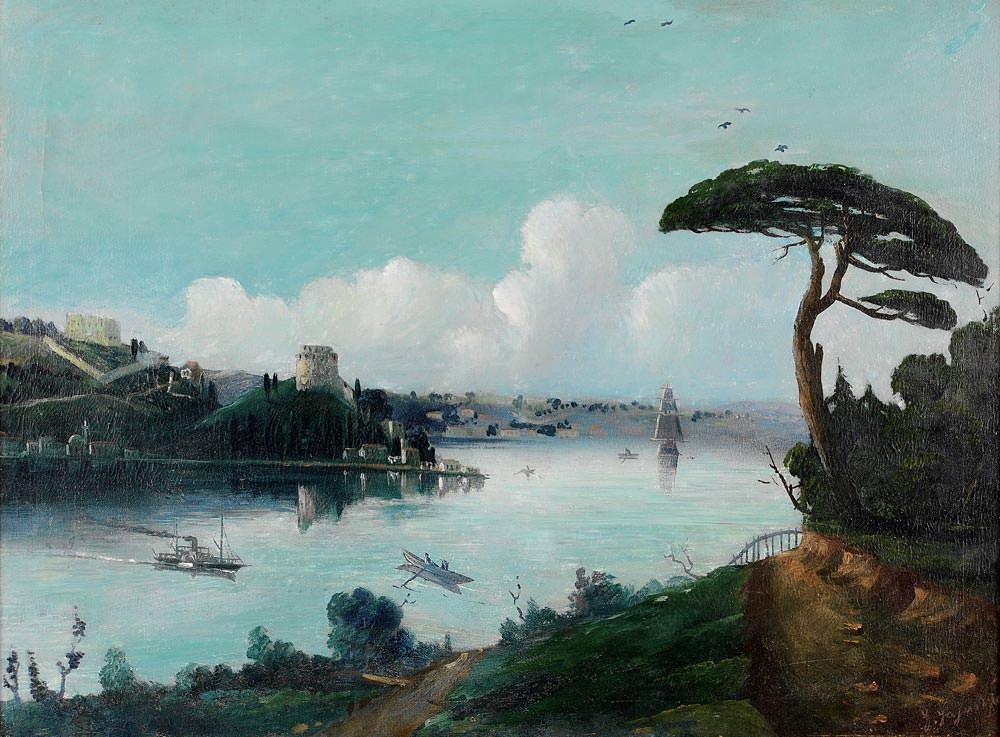
Hisar and Robert College

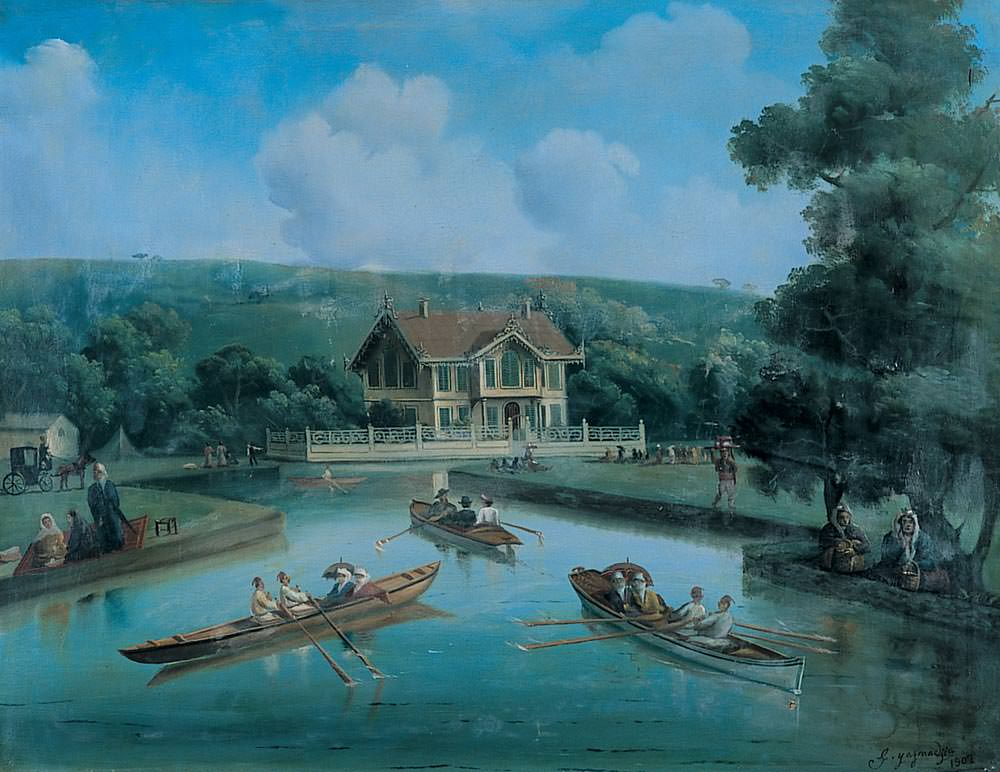
Boaters (1898)

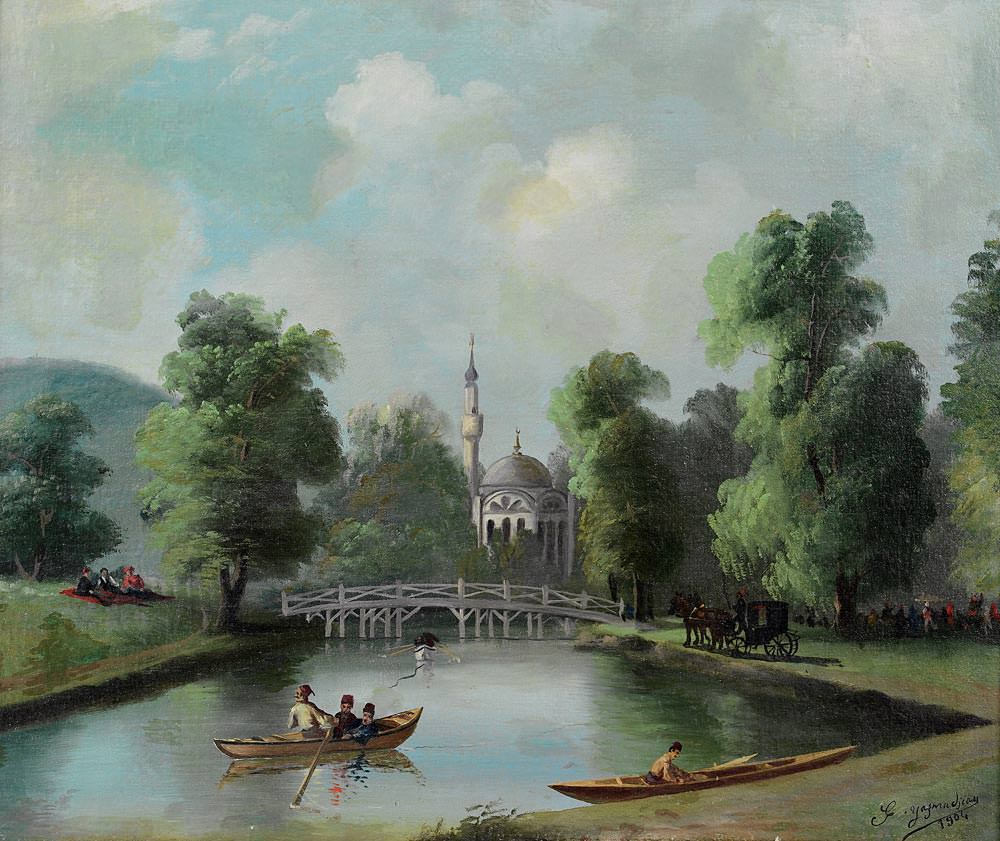
Boating in Gardens (1904)

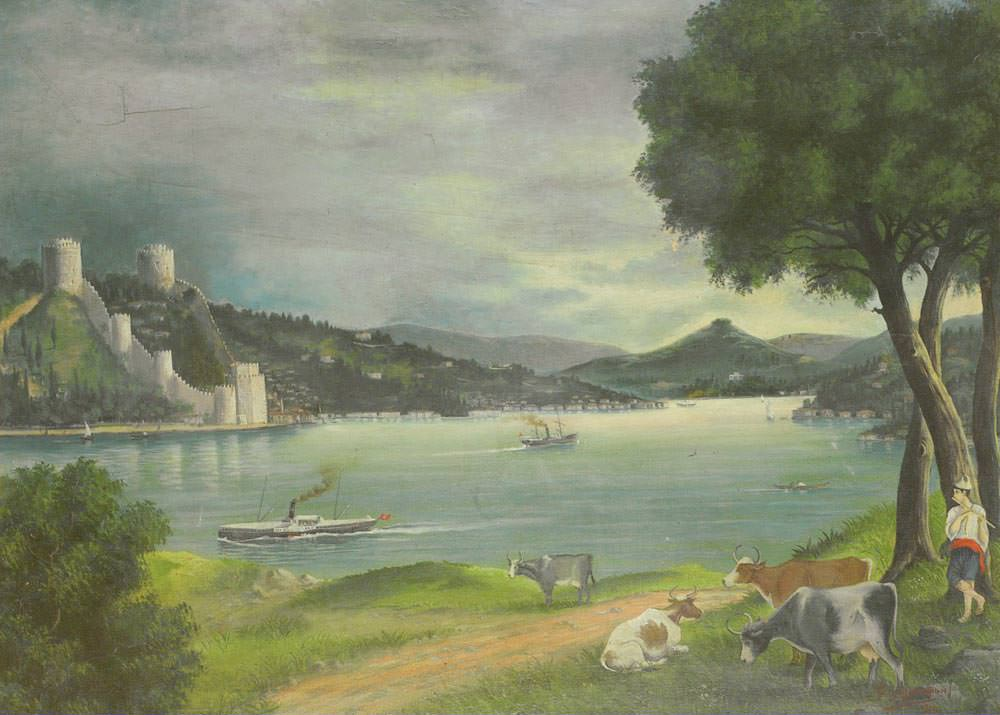
Rumeli Hisar

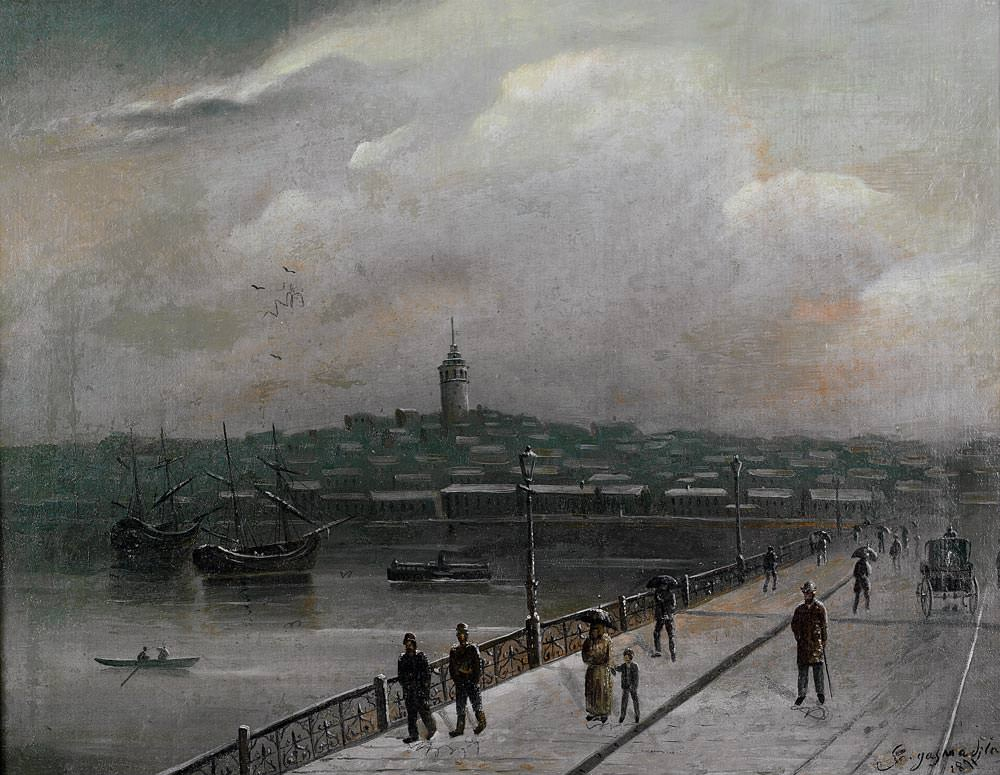
Galata Tower during Winter

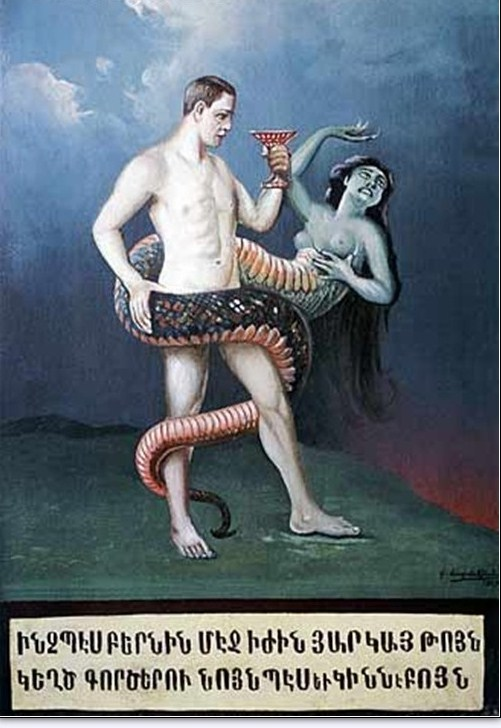
The Alluring Woman with Poison in her Mouth
