= ANKAmall =

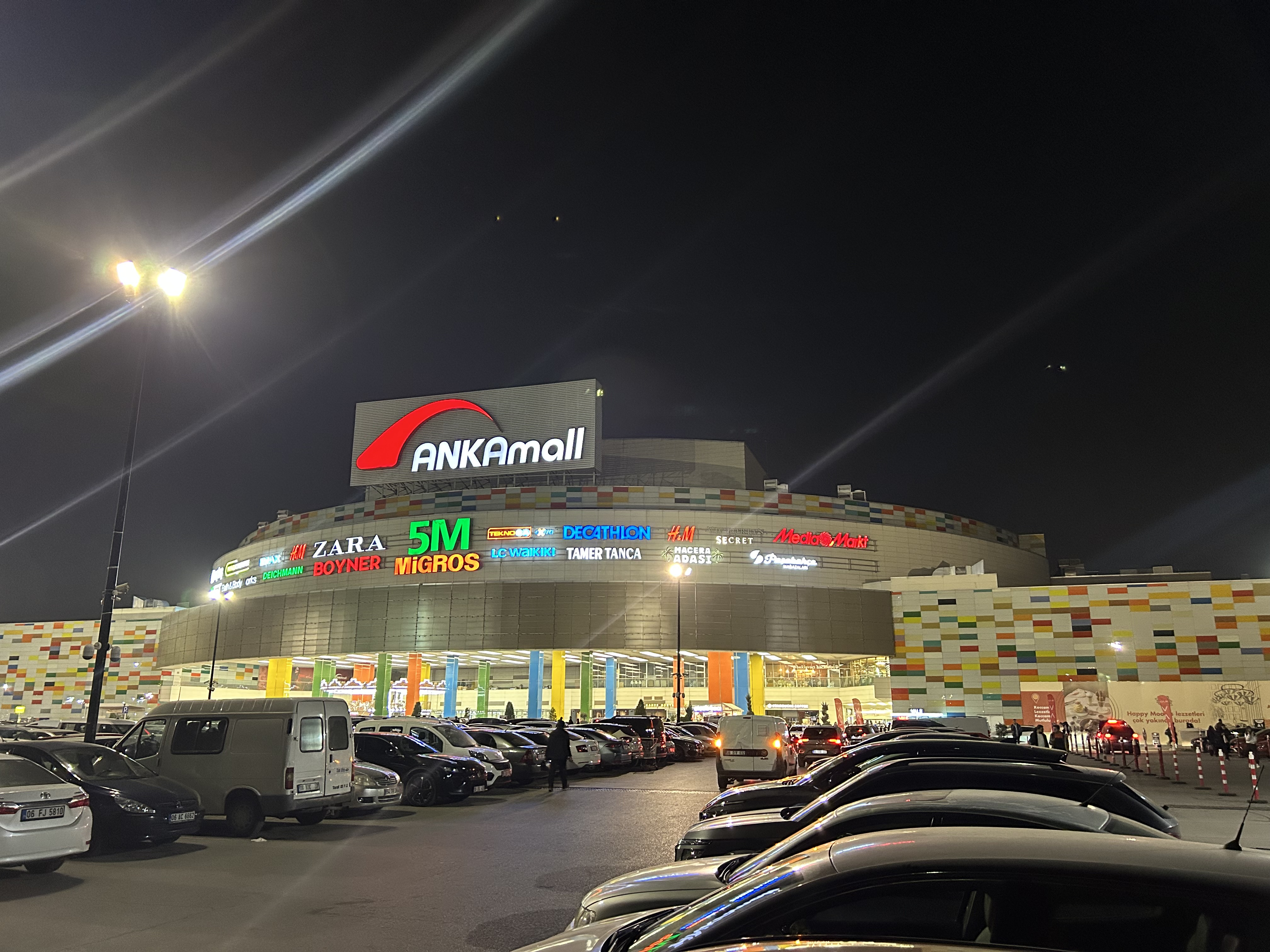
- Exterior panorama of the ANKAmall Shopping Centre in 2024
- Location: Ankara, Turkey
- Coordinates: 39°57′04″N 32°49′54″E
- Address: Akköprü - Ankara
- Opened: 27 August 1999 as Migros Shopping Centre; 12 May 2006 as ANKAmall Shopping Centre

ANKAmall is the second largest shopping centre in Turkey after Cevahir Mall from Istanbul. It is located in Ankara, covering an area of 176,000 square metres (1,890,000 sq ft). It was opened on 27 August 1999 as Migros Shopping Centre.
