= Mıgırdiç Civanyan =

Ottoman Armenian painter

Mıgırdiç Civanyan Մկրտիչ Ճիվանեան
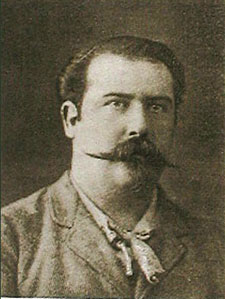
- Born: 1848 Beşiktaş, Constantinople, Ottoman Empire
- Died: February 14, 1906 (aged 57–58) Istanbul, Ottoman Empire
- Occupation: Painter

Mıgırdiç Civanyan (Armenian: Մկրտիչ Ճիվանեան, 1848 – February 14, 1906) was an Ottoman Armenian painter.

== Life ==
Mıgırdiç Civanyan was born in the Beşiktaş district of Constantinople in 1848. In 1874, he met with famed Russian-Armenian painter Ivan Aivazovsky, whose work inspired Civanyan to incorporate much of the love for the sea into his own paintings. Already knowing Italian, Civanyan went to Italy in 1876 and remained there until 1879. Due to the Hamidian massacres of Armenians, Civanyan sought refuge in Odessa in the spring of 1894.

== Style and Subject Matter ==
Mıgırdiç Civanyan is known for painting landscapes of Constantinople, especially that of the Bosphorus.

== Gallery ==
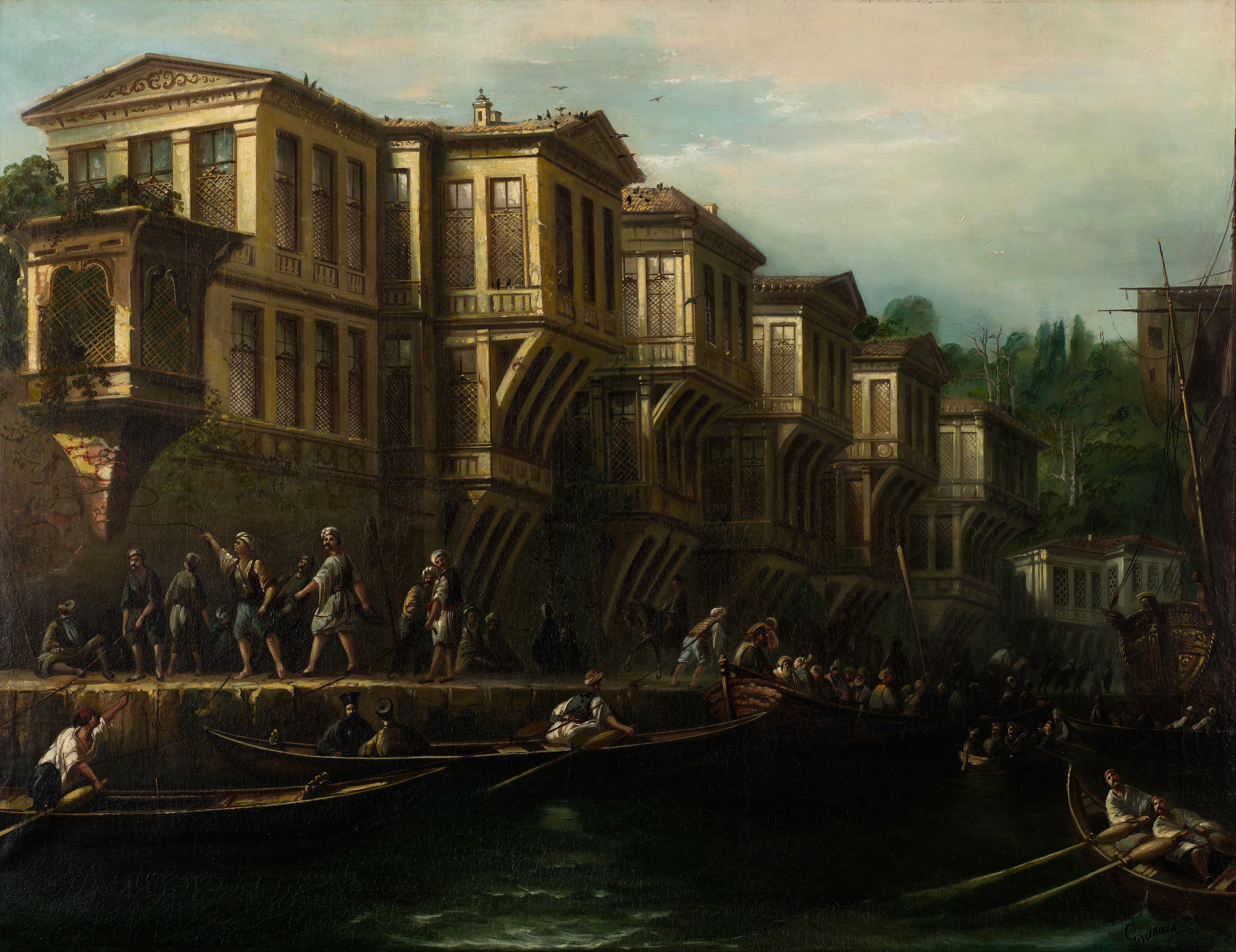
Said Paşa Waterfront Mansion

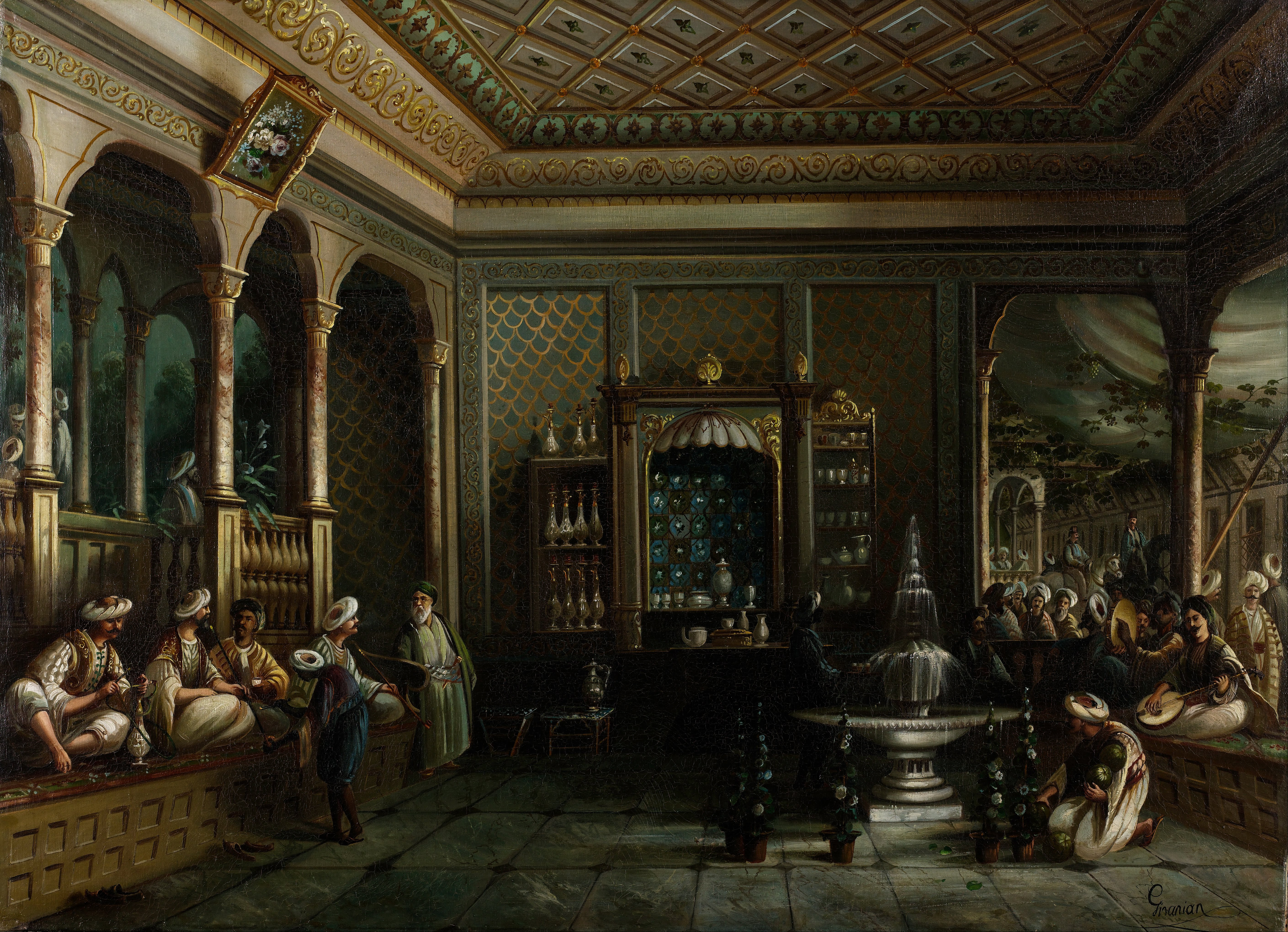
A Coffee House in Tophane

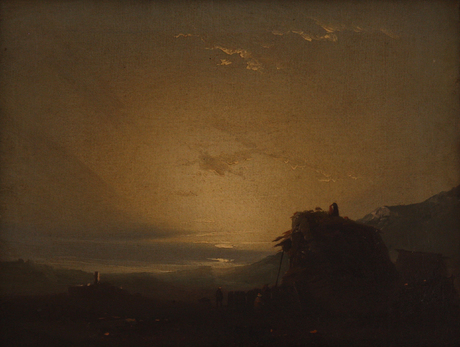
Sunset on the Sea

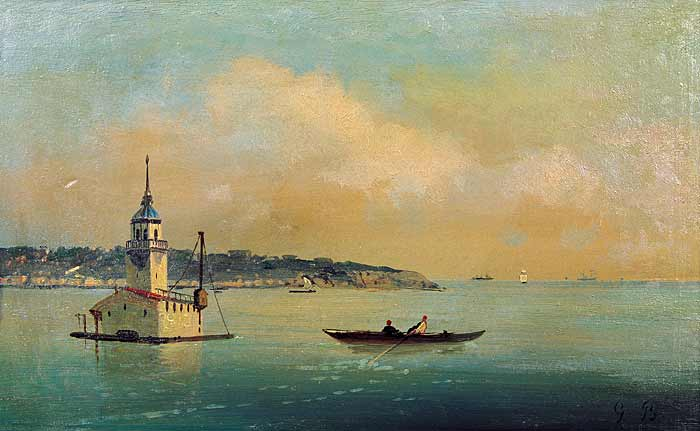

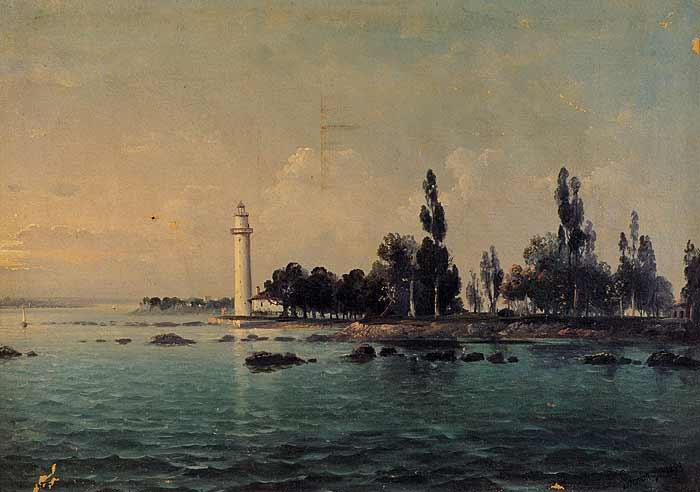

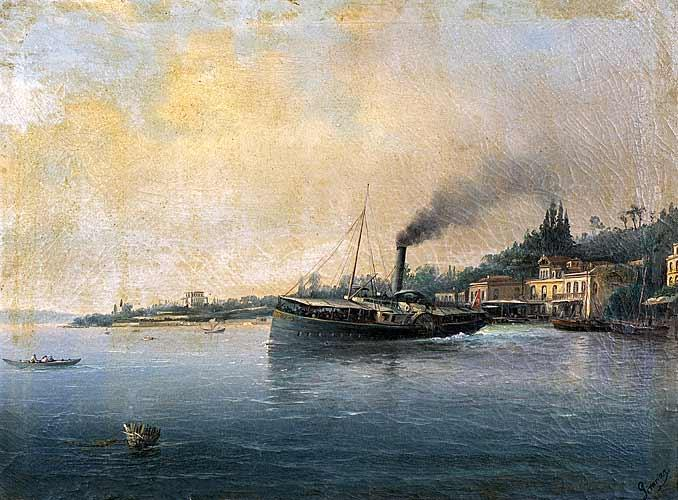

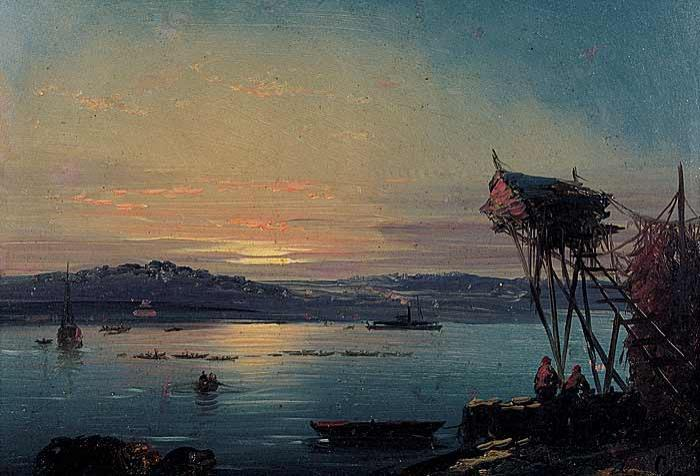
