= Confiscation of Armenian properties in Turkey =

1890s-1974 seizures by the government

External videos
- Video documentary describing the confiscation and current status of the Mkhitaryan Bomonti Armenian School

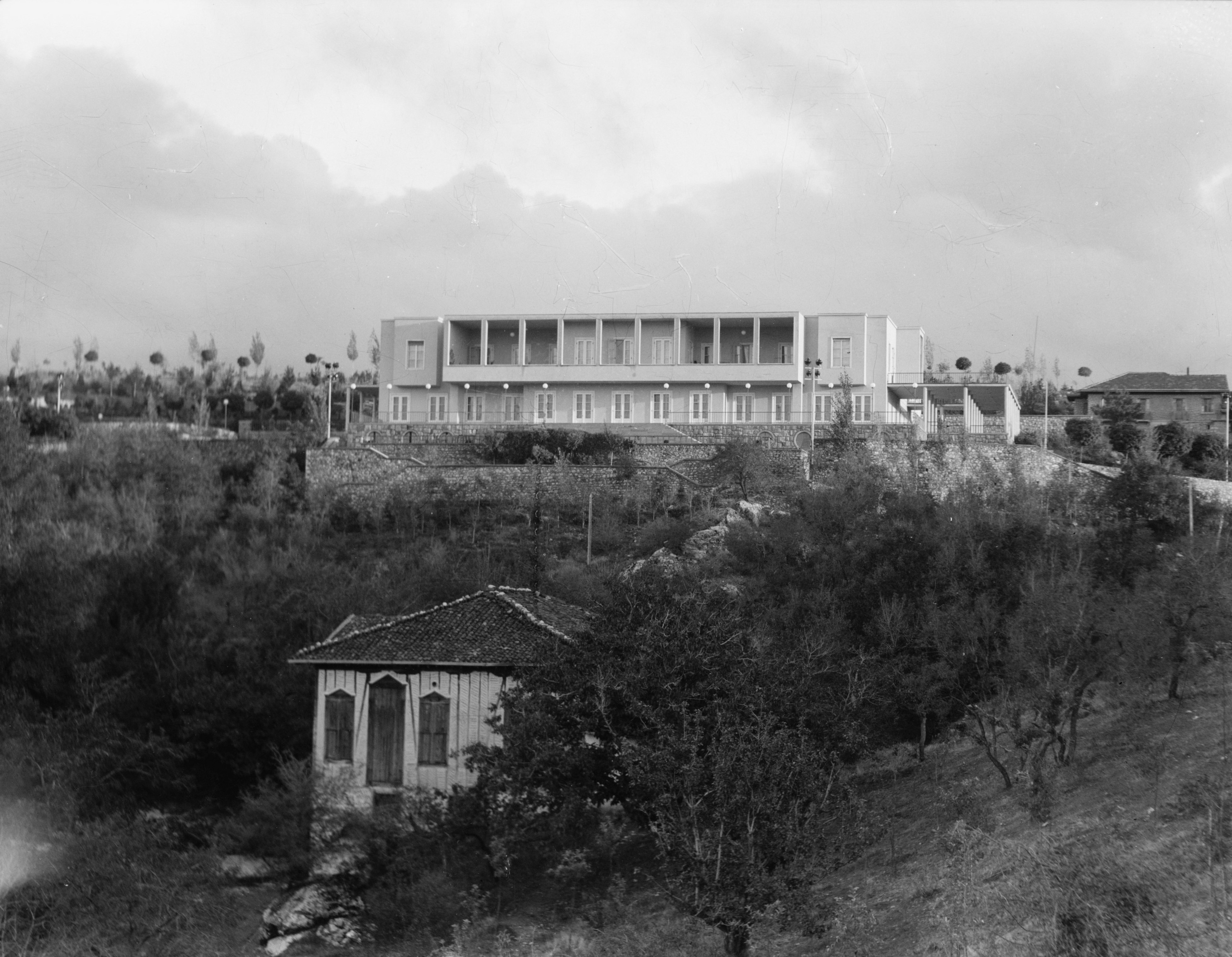
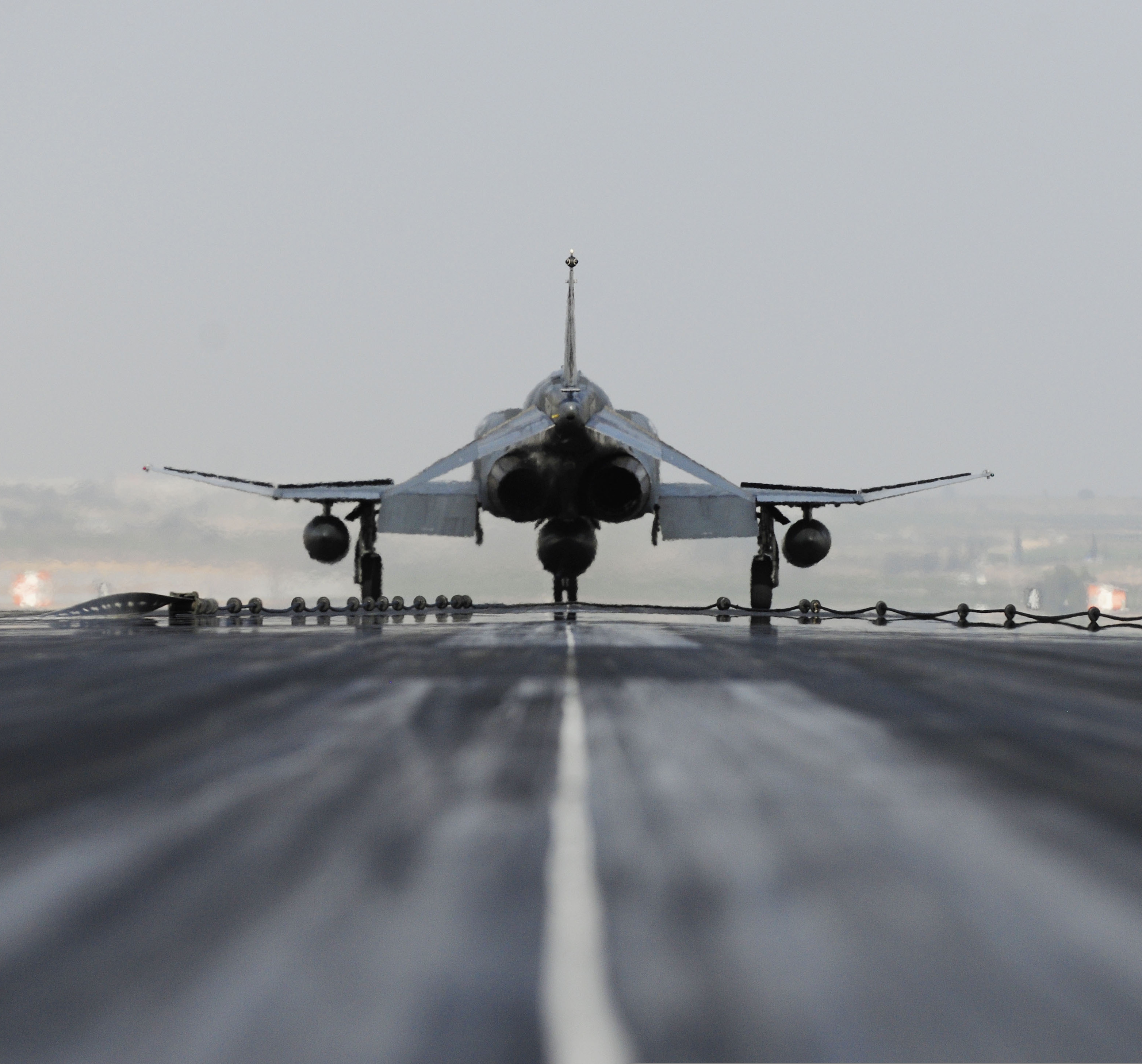
Some of the land on which the US Incirlik Air Base (right) is located was owned by Armenians and confiscated by the Ottoman government during the Armenian genocide. The Çankaya Köşkü Presidential Palace in 1935 (left), the official and current residence of the Vice President of Turkey, originally belonged to an Armenian named Ohannes Kasabian, who escaped the Armenian genocide. The property was occupied by the Bulgurluzâde family and later purchased by Mustafa Kemal Atatürk, the founder and the first president of the Republic of Turkey.

The confiscation of Armenian properties by the Ottoman and Turkish governments involved the seizure of the assets, properties, and land of the country's Armenian community. Starting with the Hamidian massacres and peaking during the Armenian genocide, the confiscation of the Armenian property lasted continuously until 1974. Much of the confiscations during the Armenian genocide were made after the Armenians were deported into the Syrian Desert with the government declaring their goods and assets left behind as "abandoned". Virtually all properties owned by Armenians living in their ancestral homeland in Western Armenia were confiscated and later distributed among the local Muslim population.

Historians argue that the mass confiscation of Armenian properties was an important factor in forming the economic basis of the Turkish Republic while endowing the Turkish economy with capital. The appropriation led to the formation of a new Turkish bourgeoisie.

== History ==
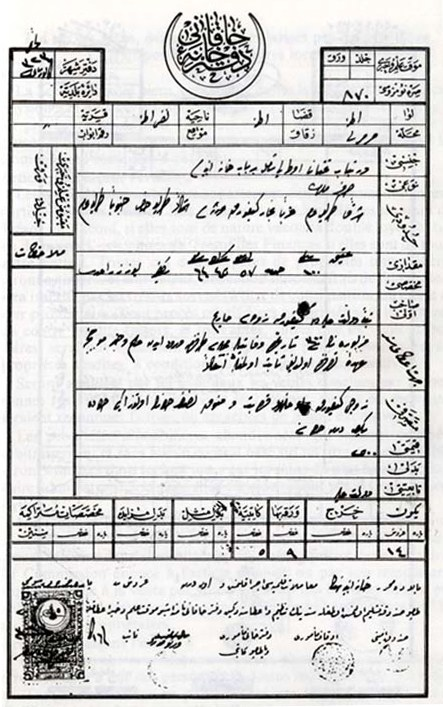
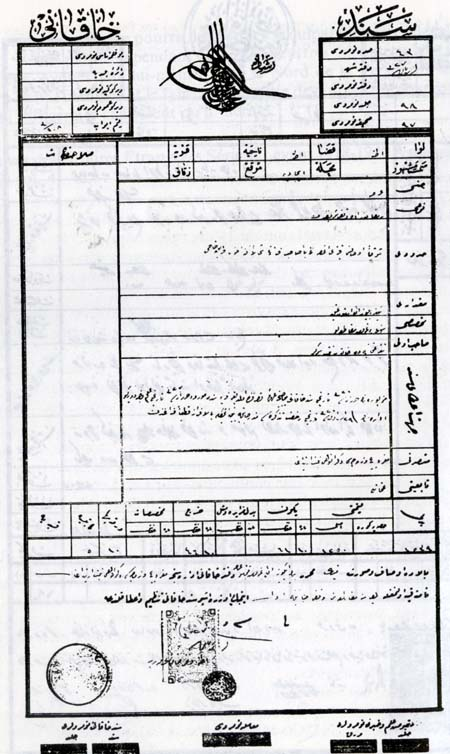
The Abandoned Properties Administration Commissions created registries that were specifically designated to record the names of the owners and the types of goods and assets they owned while providing assurances that the goods were to be available once the deportees reached their destination. (Note: Registers of the liquidation commissions are accessed through 'Emval-i Metrûke Tasfiye Komisyonlarının Esas Defteri,' in Takvim-i Vekayi, 28 Teşrinievvel 1331, #2343. For the measures used when recording the abandoned properties see 'Emval-i Metrûke Hesab-ı Cari Defterinin Suret-i Kayıt ve İsti'mâli,' in the same source.) Once the assets and properties were recorded, receipts were then handed to the deportees prior to their departure which thus served as a proof of title. Above is an example of a receipt given by the Abandoned Properties Administration Commission of a real estate property held by Mariam from Adana.

=== Confiscation as part of the Armenian genocide ===
On 16 May 1915, while the Armenian genocide was underway, a secret directive was promulgated entitled "administrative instruction regarding movable and immovable property abandoned by Armenians deported as a result of the war and unusual political circumstances." (Note: Turkish: 'Harb ve Olağanüstü Siyasi Durum Sebebiyle Başka Yerlere Gönderilen Ermenilere Ait Mülk ve Arâzînin İdâre Şekli Hakkında Talimât-nâme.' 27 Recep 1333 and 28 May 1331 (10 June 1915). The 34 articles of the law are reproduced in Prime Ministry Directorate General of Press and Information, Documents, vol. 1, Ankara, 1982, pp. 6–80.) Once enacted, the directive established special commissions, known as the "Abandoned Property Commissions" (Turkish: Emvâl-i Metrûke İdare Komisyonları) and the "Liquidation Commissions" (Turkish: Tasfiye Komisyonu), which were tasked with providing detailed information and appraising the value of assets "abandoned" by deportees under the guise of "safeguarding" them. The number of these commissions rose to 33 by January 1916. After the departure of the deportees, goods and livestock that were deemed "perishable" were prioritized as the first items that must be sold using public auctions, while the profits from these auctions were to be safeguarded under the entitlement of the owners. After providing documentation of the property (copies provided to the owners and the Ottoman Treasury), the directive specified that muhajirs (Turkish refugees mainly from the Balkan Wars) were to be settled in the vacant lands and properties belonging to the deportees. Once settled, the refugees had to register the land and houses, while other assets that were affixed to the property, such as olive groves and vineyards, were to be allocated amongst them. Unwanted items and assets were to be sold in public auctions. According to historian Dickran Kouymjian, the settlement of muhajirs into the lands and properties of deported Armenians implies that local authorities had firsthand knowledge that the deportees were to never return.

On 29 May 1915, the Committee of Union and Progress (CUP) Central Committee passed the Tehcir Law authorizing the deportation of "persons judged to be a threat to national security." The Tehcir Law emphasized that the deportees must not sell their assets, but instead provide a detailed list and submit the list to the local authorities:

Leave all your belongings—your furniture, your beddings, your artifacts. Close your shops and businesses with everything inside. Your doors will be sealed with special stamps. On your return, you will get everything you left behind. Do not sell property or any expensive item. Buyers and sellers alike will be liable for legal action. Put your money in a bank in the name of a relative who is out of the country. Make a list of everything you own, including livestock, and give it to the specified official so that all your things can be returned to you later. You have ten days to comply with this ultimatum.

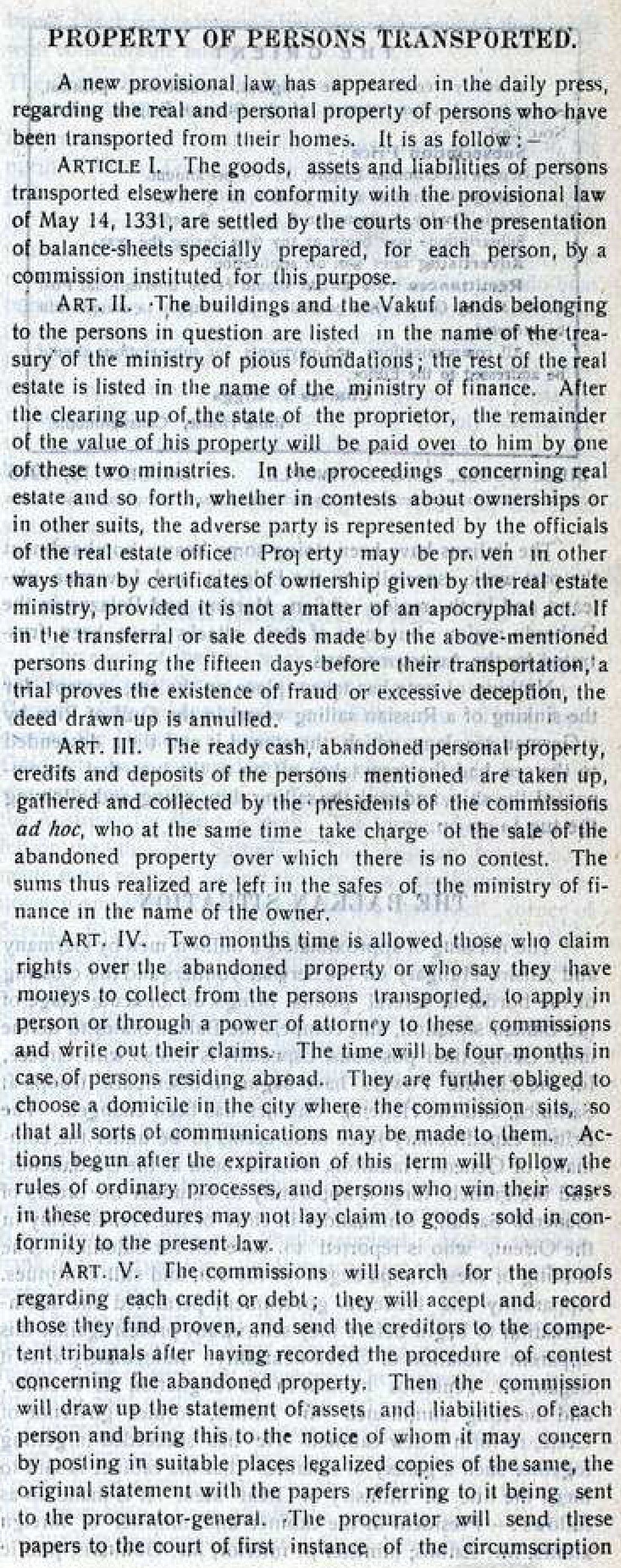
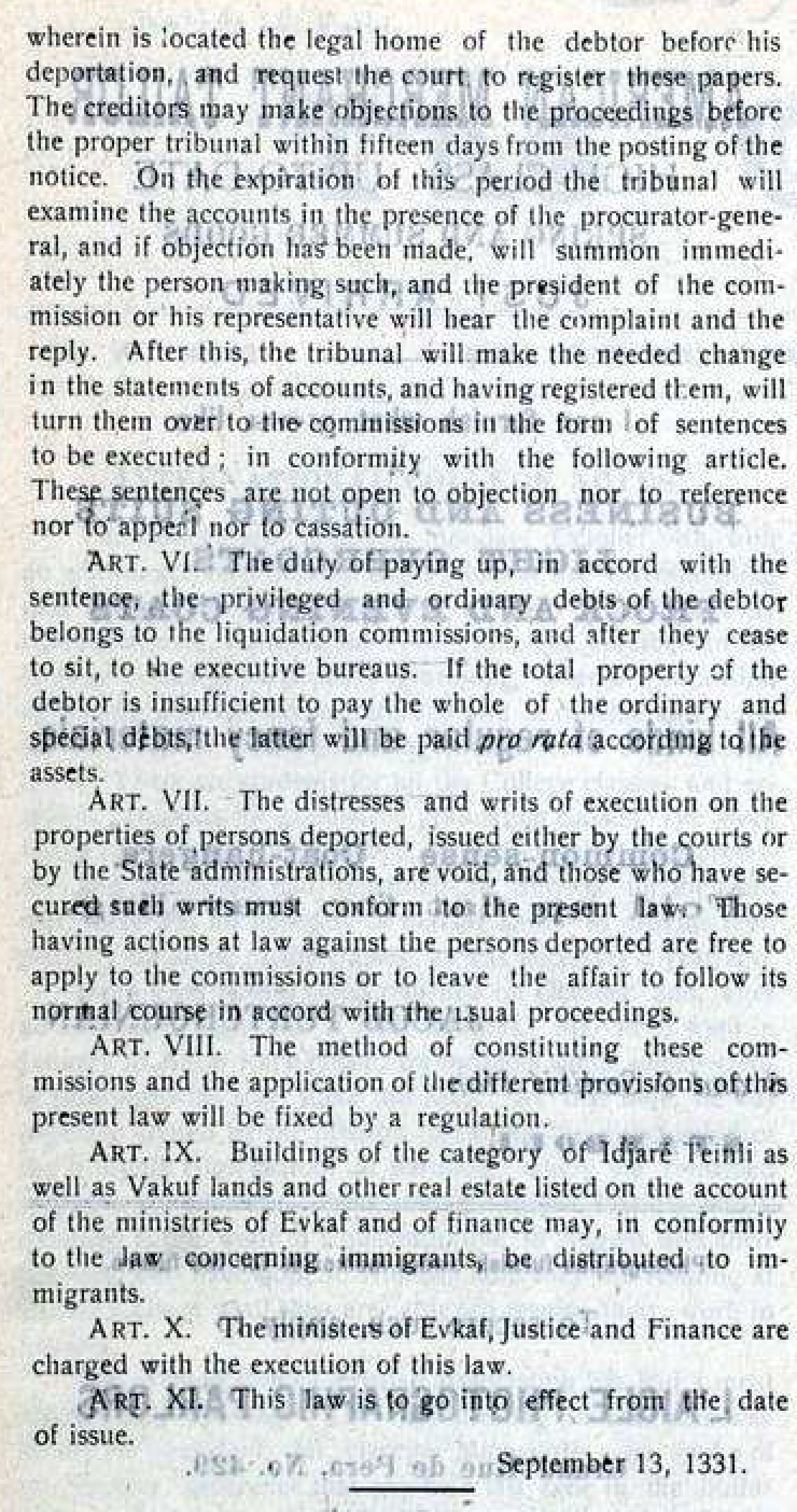
The "Temporary Law of Expropriation and Confiscation" was published in many newspapers throughout the Ottoman Empire. Above is an example of one such publication, a 23 October 1915 issue of the English language Turkish newspaper The Orient, which fully published the law with all eleven articles. Arthur von Gwinner, head of the Deutsche Bank, mocked the law by saying that the eleven articles should be reduced to two, "1. All goods of the Armenians are confiscated. 2. The government will cash in the credits of the deportees and will repay (or will not repay) their debts." Others, such as legal experts and foreign diplomats, have called it "legalization of pillage".

While the Tehcir law was being carried out, the Directorate for the Settlement of Tribes and Refugees (Turkish: Iskan-i Asairin Muhacirin Muduriyeti), under the Ministry of Internal Affairs, was tasked in June 1915 to deal with the property left behind by deported or killed Armenians. This commission, whose salaries were provided by property confiscated by Armenians, produced the "Temporary Law of Expropriation and Confiscation ("Abandoned Properties" law) and published in the official register on 27 September (13 September according to the Islamic calendar) and passed a further directive for implementation of the law on 8 November. The objectives of the laws were simultaneously to reduce Armenian property ownership, enrich national politicians, and to resettle Turkish Muslim refugees in property which was seized. The property confiscated included personal property (including land, buildings, and bank accounts), businesses, and also community property (e.g. churches). Items that were considered useful for the immediacy of the war effort were prioritized and immediately confiscated with a separate decree. Under the law, property and asset transactions were forbidden prior to the deportation thereby preventing the owners from having the opportunity to keep his or her property. Although the law was called "Temporary", the provisions within it seemed to aim toward the permanent transformation of the ethnicity of communities from Armenian to Turkish Muslim.

These resettlement laws did contain formal reporting of property to national authorities and contained procedures for those who had property taken to sue, but the specifics of the law made these provisions serve the larger goal to "Turkify" regions and economic sectors. The property records and revenue generated from the sale or rent of confiscated property were all recorded and deposited with the Ministry of Financial Affairs to provide for the possible return of property to owners. In addition, the law provided that those whose property had been confiscated to sue for return of the property (and payment for any damages which occurred). However, the law required property owners to sue and be present themselves (not allowing the power of attorney), an impossibility when property owners had been killed or deported. In addition, the defendant in any case would be the state which made the chances of success in any lawsuit extremely unlikely. Finally, the law provided that the confiscated property be sold at auction; however, because the law specified that "anybody other than Turkish Muslim refugees can only acquire property in Turkey with the approval of the Ministry of Internal Affairs", the result was that non-Turkish Muslims were effectively excluded. Property was provided often to national and local political elites, who eventually gave them to Turkish Muslim refugees.

All the properties of the Armenians were confiscated, nominally to the state for the war fund. In this way all the Armenian houses, stores, shops, fields, gardens, vineyards, merchandise, household goods, rugs, were taken. The work was the charge of a commission, the members of which I met personally a number of times. It was commonly said that the commission did not actually receive enough for the government purposes to cover its expenses. Real estate was put up for rent at auction and was most of it bid in at prices ridiculously low by persons who were on the inside. This I know not only as a matter of common information but directly from a Turkish attorney who was in our employ and who provided himself with one of the best Armenian houses. Turks moved out of their more squalid habitations into the better Armenian houses whose owners had been 'deported.' All the property of the Armenians except some remnants left to the Armenians who had embraced Mohammedanism was thus plundered.

— President of the Anatolia College in Mersovan, Dr. George E. White

The impact of these laws were immediate. According to a report in June 1916 by the German ambassador stationed in Constantinople, the goods of the Armenians "have long since been confiscated, and their capital has been liquidated by a so-called commission, which means that if an Armenian owned a house valued at, say, £T100, a Turk—a friend or member [of the Ittihad and Terakki]—could have it for around £T2."

The only notable domestic opposition was by Ottoman parliamentary representative Ahmed Riza, who stated:

It is unlawful to designate the Armenian assets as "abandoned goods" for the Armenians, the proprietors, did not abandon their properties voluntarily; they were forcibly, compulsorily removed from their domiciles and exiled. Now the government through its efforts is selling their goods ... Nobody can sell my property if I am unwilling to sell it. Article 21 of the Constitution forbids it. If we are a constitutional regime functioning in accordance with constitutional law we can't do this. This is atrocious. Grab my arm, eject me from my village, then sell my goods and properties, such a thing can never be permissible. Neither the conscience of the Ottomans nor the law can allow it.

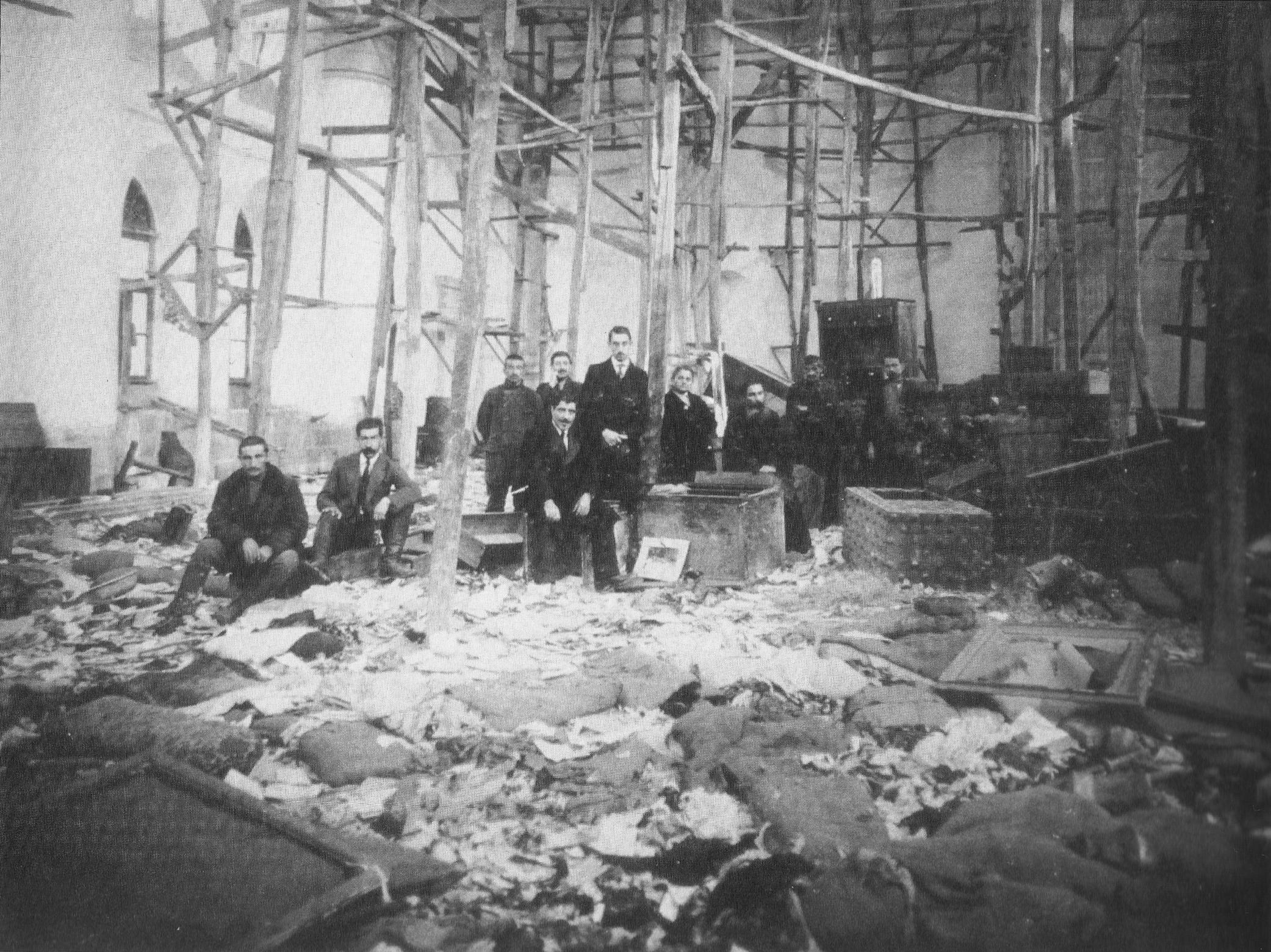
A 1918 photo of an Armenian church in Trabzon, which was used as an auction site and distribution center of confiscated Armenian goods and belongings after the Armenian genocide

Formal directives were made to have much of the properties and businesses confiscated from the Armenians to be transferred into the hands of Muslims. On 6 January 1916, Talaat Pasha, the Interior Minister of the Ottoman Empire, decreed:

The movable property left by the Armenians should be conserved for long-term preservation, and for the sake of an increase of Muslim businesses in our country, companies need to be established strictly made up of Muslims. Movable property should be given to them under suitable conditions that will guarantee the business's steady consolidation. The founder, the management, and the representatives should be chosen from honorable leaders and the elite, and to allow tradesmen and agriculturists to participate in its dividends, the vouchers need to be half a lira or one lira and registered to their names to preclude that the capital falls in foreign hands. The growth of entrepreneurship in the minds of Muslim people needs to be monitored, and this endeavor and the results of its implementation need to be reported to the ministry step by step. (Note: Başbakanlık Osmanlı Arşivi (Ottoman Archives, Istanbul), DH.ŞFR 59/239, Interior Ministry to all provinces, 6 January 1916.)

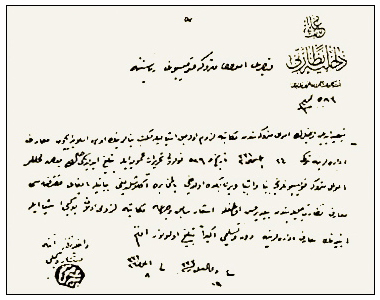
The directive relative to the seizure of Armenian schools was sent by the Interior Ministry to all the provinces in the Ottoman Empire. Dated 2 September 1915, the example shown above was sent from the Department of Settlement of Tribes and Refugees of the Interior Ministry to the director of the Kayseri branch of the abandoned property commission.

In addition to churches and monasteries, other community owned properties confiscated were schools and educational facilities. The Interior Ministry had ordered such educational facilities to be assigned to Muslims:

It is necessary to appropriate the schools of the towns and villages that have been emptied of Armenians to Muslim immigrants to be settled there. However, the present value of the buildings, the amount and value of its educational materials needs to be registered and sent to the department of general recordkeeping. (Note: Başbakanlık Osmanlı Arşivi (Ottoman Archives, Istanbul), DH.ŞFR 54/101, Directorate for the Settlement of Tribes and Immigrants (İskân-ı Aşair ve Muhacirîn Müdüriyeti) to provinces, 22 June 1915.)

Following the decree, private Armenian schools became Ottoman Turkish schools, and school supplies were distributed to the Turkish Muslim population. Abraham Harutiunian, a priest living in Zeitun, notes in his memoirs that the school in Zeitun was confiscated by the government and that "the Armenians no longer had any right to education, and the campus was now filled with hundreds of Turkish children."

By the early 1930s, all properties belonging to Armenians who were subject to deportation had been confiscated. Since then, no restitution of property confiscated during the Armenian genocide has taken place. The laws concerning abandoned property remained in effect for 73 years until it was finally abolished on 11 June 1986. The mass confiscation of properties provided the opportunity for ordinary lower-class Turks (i.e. peasantry, soldiers, and laborers) to rise to the ranks of the middle class. Contemporary Turkish historian Uğur Ümit Üngör asserts that "the elimination of the Armenian population left the state an infrastructure of Armenian property, which was used for the progress of Turkish (settler) communities. In other words: the construction of an étatist Turkish "national economy" was unthinkable without the destruction and expropriation of Armenians."

==== Extent of Ottoman confiscation ====
Although the exact extent of confiscated property during the Armenian genocide is unknown, according to Talaat Pasha's private documents, the chief initiator of the Tehcir Law, a total of 20,545 buildings were confiscated including 267,536 acres of land along with other parcels of agricultural and tillable lands such as 76,942 acres of vineyards, 703,941 acres of olive groves, and 4,573 acres of mulberry gardens. Along with the confiscation of physical land, Ottoman state took over life insurance policies from the Armenians. Talaat Pasha justified Ottoman actions by stating that the Armenians were "practically all dead ... and have left no heirs to collect the money." It, of course, all escheats to the State. The Government is the beneficiary now."

During the Paris Peace Conference, the Armenian delegation presented an assessment of $3.7 billion (about $69 billion today) worth of material losses owned solely by the Armenian church. During the conference in February 1920, the Armenian community presented an additional demand for the restitution of property and assets seized by the Ottoman government. The joint declaration, which was submitted to the Supreme Council by the Armenian delegation and prepared by the religious leaders of the Armenian community, claimed that the Ottoman government had destroyed 2,000 churches and 200 monasteries and had provided the legal system for giving these properties to other parties. The declaration also provided a financial assessment of the total losses of personal property and assets of both Turkish and Russian Armenia with 14,598,510,000 and 4,532,472,000 francs respectively; totaling to an estimated $446 billion today. Furthermore, the Armenian community asked for the restitution of church owned property and reimbursement of its generated income. The Ottoman government never responded to this declaration and so restitution did not occur.

The issue of confiscated Armenian property came about in a number of treaties signed between the First Republic of Armenia and the Ottoman Empire. Both the Treaty of Batum (signed 4 June 1918) and the Treaty of Sèvres (signed 10 August 1920) contained provisions related to the restitution for confiscated properties of Armenians. The Treaty of Sèvres under Article 144 specified that the Abandoned Property commissions and Liquidation commissions must be abolished and the laws of confiscation be annulled. Meanwhile, however, those who seized the assets and properties of Armenians turned to support the Turkish national movement since the dissolution of the Ottoman government would mean that the properties and assets would be protected under their name. Thus, on 8 May 1920, the first law promulgated by the newly established parliament was to pardon those charged of massacre and expropriation of property by the Turkish courts-martial of 1919-20. Furthermore, with the establishment of the Turkish republic and the signing of the Treaty of Lausanne (24 July 1923), the provisions of the Treaty of Sèvres eventually never took effect, and the liquidation committees involved with the confiscation of Armenian property resumed operations.

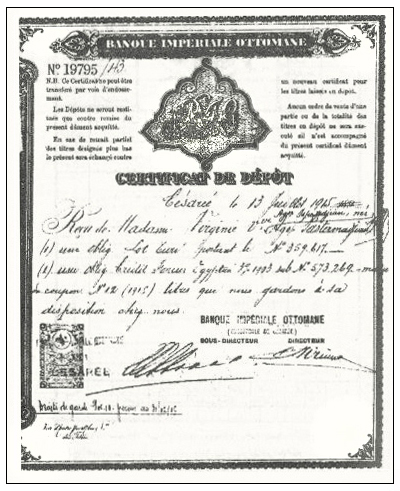
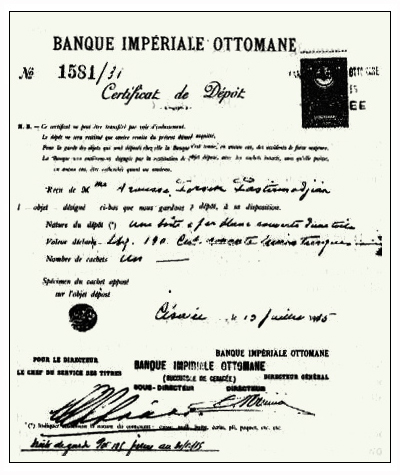
Certificate of deposits made to the Kayseri branch of the Imperial Ottoman Bank belonging to Mrs. Arousse Parsek Pastirmadjian (left) and Mrs. Virginie, widow of Agop Pastirmadjian (right). The banks also held valuable commodities which were permitted to be deposited as well. For example, Mrs. Arousse Parsek Pastirmadjian's certificate states that the bank holds as a deposit "one white tin plate box covered of linen - declared value TL 190." Such certificates are still held by many survivors of the Armenian genocide and their heirs today.

In addition to confiscated property, large sums of money and precious metals belonging to Armenians were also seized and deposited into the treasuries of the Ottoman government or in various German or Austrian banks during the war. Such sums were believed to be withdrawn from the bank accounts of deported and killed Armenians. An official memorandum prepared by former British Prime Ministers Stanley Baldwin and H. H. Asquith was sent to then Prime Minister of Great Britain Ramsay MacDonald describing such seizures and deposits:

The sum of 5,000,000 Turkish gold pounds (representing about 30.000 kilograms of gold) deposited by the Turkish government at the Reichsbank in Berlin in 1916, and taken over by the Allies after the Armistice, was in large part (perhaps wholly) Armenian money. After the forced deportation of the Armenians in 1915, their current and deposit accounts were transferred, by government order, to the State Treasury in Constantinople.

Much of the money deposited into banks and other financial institutions has also been subsequently seized in the immediate aftermath of the deportations. Once a deposit was made, a certificate was given to the depositor as a proof of deposit. However, once the deportations began, withdrawals were prohibited. Much of the deportees who had held deposits were left with only certificates in their possession. Many of the depositors still carry the certificates of deposit today. Historian Kevork Baghdjian states that the worth of these deposits "should rise to astronomical sums today," with the "deposited capital and interests combined." The journalist Herbert Adams Gibbons estimated that "more than three-fourths of the estimated" wealth of the Armenian people was lost in 1914.

=== Tekâlif-i Milliye (1921) ===
In August 1921, Mustafa Kemal issued the Tekâlif-i Milliye orders, which officially allowed the Turkish government to confiscate abandoned goods and foodstuffs suitable for military use. The order covered property belonging to Greeks and Armenians who had been forcibly displaced from their homes. Subsequently, 75% of the requisition debts were owed to Greeks and Armenians, but, unlike Muslims, Greeks and Armenians were never paid back. The decision to withhold payment to them was made by the Turkish government in secret parliamentary sessions. The government also sent secret instructions to provincial financial officials stating that the restrictions applied only to Greeks and Armenians. Officials were told to delay claims by announcing "investigations" or "inquiries" until the legal period for pursuing them had expired.

=== Confiscation during the Turkish Republic ===
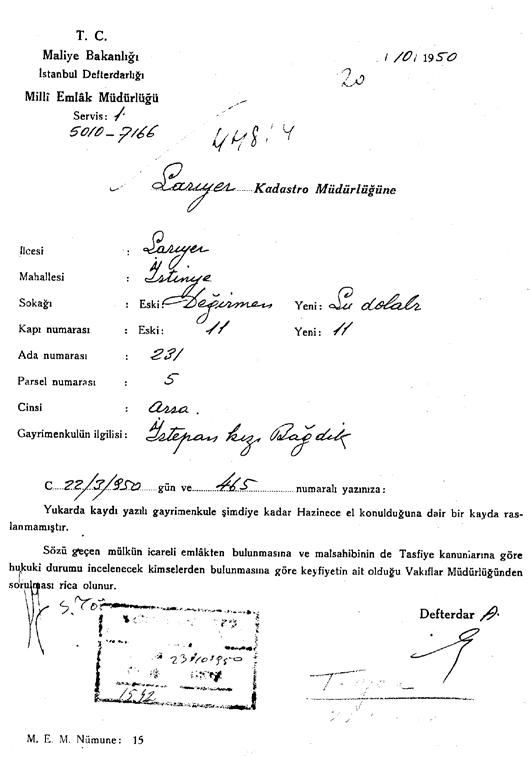
An example of an eviction notice dated 1 January 1950 of an Armenian woman issued by the Internal Revenue Board and sent to the local Cadastral Directorate. Such evictions were assigned to special investigative committees that dealt solely with the properties of Armenians.

Following the Turkish War of Independence and the creation of the Republic of Turkey in 1923, the confiscation resumed with most Armenians having been deported or killed. During the early Republican era, the legal terminology of those deported was changed from "transported persons" to "persons who lost or fled from the country."

On 15 April 1923, just before the signing of the Treaty of Lausanne, the Turkish government enacted the "Law of Abandoned Properties" which confiscated properties of any Armenian who was not present on their property, regardless of the circumstances of the reason. While local courts were authorized to appraise the value of any property and provide an avenue for property owners to make claims, the law prohibited the use of any power of attorney by absent property holders, preventing them from filing suit without returning to the country. In addition, the defendant in the case would be the state of Turkey, which had created specially tasked committees to deal with each case.

In addition to this law, the Turkish government continued revoking the citizenship of many people with a law on 23 May 1927 which stated that "Ottoman subjects who during the War of Independence took no part in the National movement, kept out of Turkey and did not return from 24 July 1923 to the date of the publication of this law, have forfeited Turkish nationality." (Note: Law No. 1042 of the Republic of Turkey, 23 May 1927) Additionally, a further law passed on 28 May 1928 stipulated that those who had lost their citizenship would be expelled from Turkey, not allowed to return, and that their property would be confiscated by the Turkish government, and Turkish migrants would be resettled in the properties.

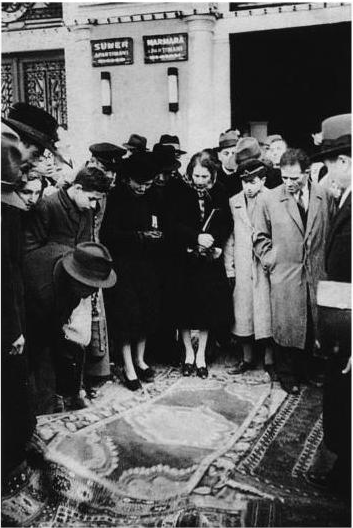
Carpets of non-Muslims unable to pay the tax hike being sold at public auction during the Varlık Vergisi. Such items were sold at a price significantly lower than actual worth in order to avoid forced labor and possible death in labor camps in eastern Turkey.

In the preparation for possible entry into World War II, the Turkish government introduced a tax, the Varlık Vergisi, which disproportionately targeted Turkey's non-Muslim residents. Many Armenians, and other non-Muslim populations, were forced to sell their property at significantly reduced prices through public auctions in order to pay for the sudden tax hike or have the properties confiscated by the state. In addition, the law allowed authorities to confiscate the property of any relative of a taxed person in order to pay the tax. From this tax, the Turkish government collected 314,900,000 liras or about US$270 million (80% of the state budget) from the confiscation of non-Muslim assets.

This period coincided with further confiscations of private property belonging to Armenians. Special commissions were created to separate the evictions of non-Muslims from others. The investigators of this commission usually expedited the evacuation and eventual confiscation of the non-Muslim property in question.

The Varlık Vergisi was followed by the Istanbul pogrom a few years later, where an organized mob attacked Greeks and Armenians on 6–7 September 1955. The material damage was considerable, with damage to 5317 properties (including 4214 homes, 1004 businesses, 73 churches, 2 monasteries, 1 synagogue, and 26 schools). Estimates of the economic cost of the damage range from the Turkish government's estimate of 69.5 million Turkish lira (equivalent to 24.8 million US$), the British estimate of 100 million GBP (about 200 million US$), the World Council of Churches' estimate of 150 million US$, and the Greek government's estimate of 500 million US$. The pogrom eventually led to an exodus of non-Muslims from the country, resulting in a significant amount of "abandoned" properties. The properties left behind by those who fled were confiscated by the Turkish state after ten years.

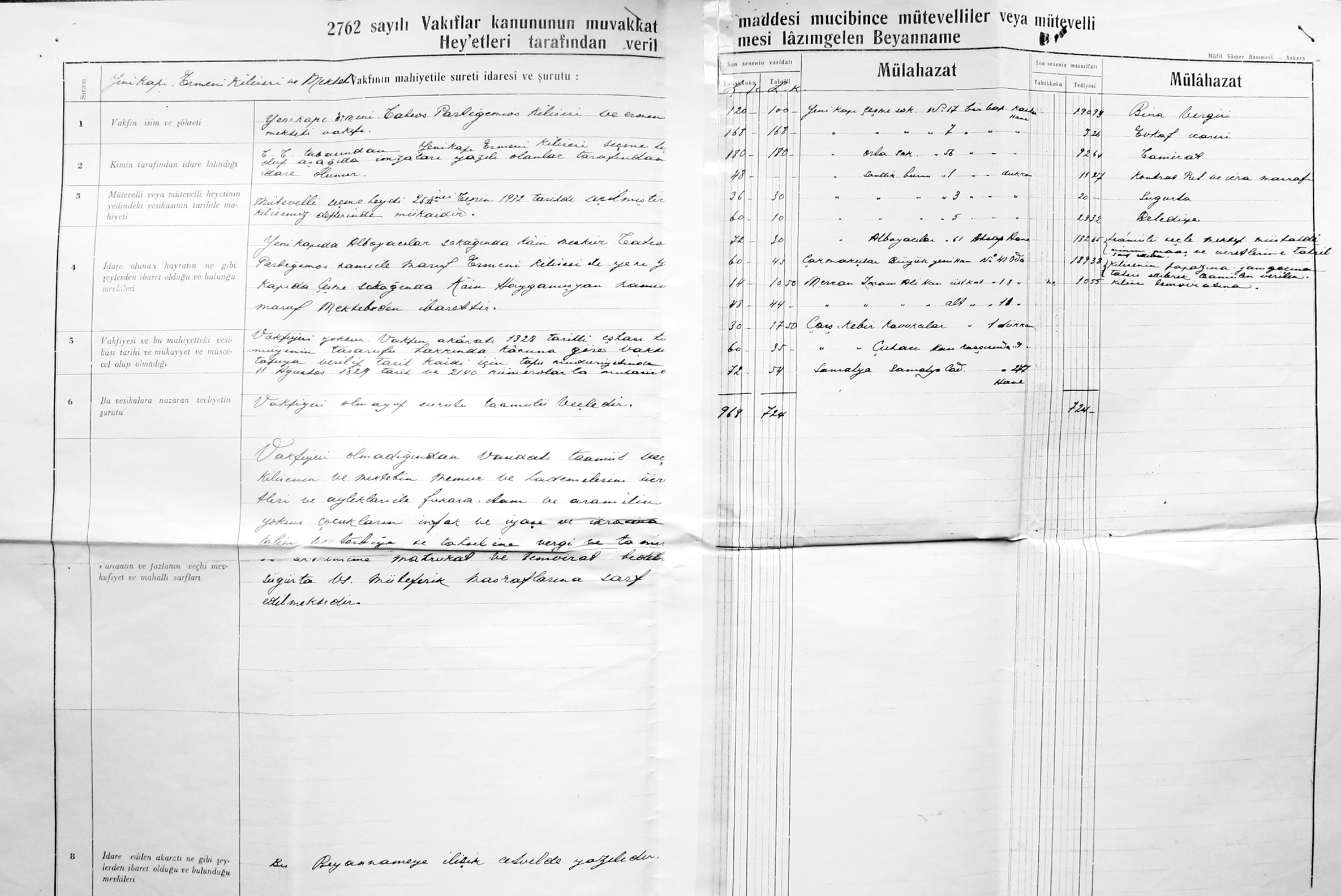
In 1936, the Turkish government requested from minority foundations to provide a list of their owned assets and properties. Above is an example of such a declaration from the Surp Tateos Partoghimeos Armenian Church and of the Hayganushyan School Foundation. Although twenty-one of the properties belonging to the foundation were formally listed in the declaration, fourteen of them were eventually confiscated.

In the 1960s, new laws were passed, which made it impossible for Armenians to establish new foundations or to buy or bequeath additional properties. One such law code (Law no. 903) adopted in 1967, along with a second paragraph amended to the Turkish Civil Code (no. 743) declared that, "The registration of foundations that are in violation of law, morality, tradition or national interests, or that were established to support a political belief, a certain race or members of a minority will not be approved." Such laws are considered by legal experts as a violation of articles concerning minority rights found in the Treaty of Laussane, the Turkish constitution, and Article 11 of the European Convention on Human Rights, which grants the "freedom to establish foundations and hold meetings." The new amendment and law code became the basis for a new series of confiscations that significantly obstructed the daily lives of Armenians in Turkey.

In 1974 new legislation was passed that stated that non-Muslim trusts could not own more property than that which had been registered under their name in 1936. As a result, more than 1,400 assets (included churches, schools, residential buildings, hospitals, summer camps, cemeteries, and orphanages) of the Istanbul Armenian community since 1936 were retrospectively classified as illegal acquisitions and seized by the state. Under the legislation, the Turkish courts rendered Turkish citizens of non-Turkish descent as "foreigners", thereby placing them under the same legal regulations of any foreign company or property holder living outside of Turkey who was not a Turkish national. The provisions further provided that foundations belonging to non-Muslims are a potential "threat" to national security. The process involved returning any property acquired after 1936, whether through lottery, will, donation, or purchase, to their former owners or inheritors. If former owners had died leaving no inheritors, the property was to be transferred to specified governmental agencies such as the Treasury or the Directorate General of Foundations.

On 11 June 1986, the laws concerning "abandoned" properties during the Armenian genocide were abrogated, which ended 73 years of effectiveness. Throughout the Republican period, the laws continued to provide a legal basis for the confiscation of additional property that belonged to the deportees. Though the laws were abolished in 1986, the General Directorate of Land Registry and Cadastre (Turkish: Tapu ve Kadastro Genel Müdürlüğü) issued an order on 29 June 2001 which effectively transferred all the leftover "abandoned" properties to the government. (Note: Decree no. B.02.0.0014/3.00–0694 of the General Directorate of Land Registry and Cadastre, 29 June 2001) The order also forbid the disclosure of any information regarding the title or the documentation of the properties. As a result, the owners or their heirs could not make claims to the property since it was now securely sanctioned under Turkish law and had become property of the state.

=== Current developments ===
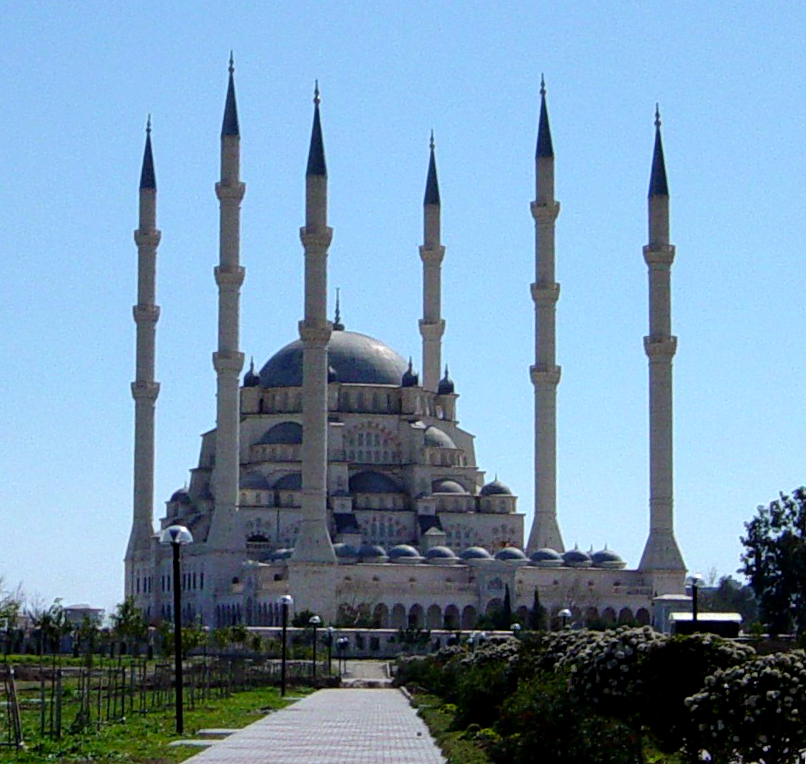
Numerous cemeteries served the Armenian community during the Ottoman Empire. With most confiscated, three remain functioning today. One such example is the Sabancı Merkez Mosque in Adana, which was built on the lands of a confiscated Armenian cemetery.

Terminology of former legislation and civil codes has not significantly changed since the 1960s and 70s, ultimately subjugating the assets and properties of the Armenian community to further confiscations. Though terminology has slightly changed, the current civil codes still have enough executive powers to confiscate property under the basis of protecting the "national unity" of the Republic of Turkey.

1967 civil code no. 743	Current civil code no. 4721
The registration of foundations that are in violation of law, morality, tradition or national interests, or that were established to support a political belief, a certain race or members of a minority will not be approved. (Note: Turkish: "Kanuna, ahlâka ve âdaba veya milli çıkarlara aykırı olan veya siyasi düşünce veya belli bir ırk veya azınlık mensuplarını desteklemek amacı ile kurulmuş olan vakıfların tesciline karar verilemez")	Foundations cannot be established in violation of the characteristics of the Republic as set out in the constitution and the founding principles of the constitution, law, morality, national unity and national interests or to support a certain race or members of a certain community. (Note: Turkish: "Cumhuriyetin Anayasa ile belirlenen niteliklerine ve Anayasanın temel ilkelerine, hukuka, ahlaka, milli birliğe ve milli menfaatlere aykırı veya belli bir ırk ya da cemaat mensuplarını desteklemek amacıyla vakıf kurulamaz")

Due to such regulations and law codes, no church was ever constructed in the history of the Republic of Turkey. All churches in existence today were built before the establishment of the Republic in 1923. A permit for the construction of a Syriac church was granted in December 2012, however, it was refused by the Assyrian community since the land used to be a Latin cemetery.

In an attempt by the ruling Justice and Development Party (AKP) to comply with European Union standards, the opening up of the Ottoman land registry and deed records to the public were considered. However, on 26 August 2005, the National Security Committee of the Turkish Armed Forces forbid such attempts by stating:

The Ottoman records kept at the Land Register and Cadaster Surveys General Directorate offices must be sealed and not available to the public, as they have the potential to be exploited by alleged genocide claims and property claims against the State Charitable Foundation assets. Opening them to general public use is against state interests.

On 15 June 2011, the United States House Foreign Affairs Committee of the 112th Congress passed House Resolution 306 by a vote of 43 to one, which demanded from the Republic of Turkey "to safeguard its Christian heritage and to return confiscated church properties." Turkish-American organizations attempted to block the bill from passing but ultimately failed.

== Contemporary analysis ==
=== Istanbul ===
After two years of research, the Hrant Dink Foundation published a book, some 400 pages long, describing the current situation of seized assets and properties of the Armenian community. With the help of government deed and title records, the members of the Hrant Dink foundation have uncovered the title records of all the properties owned by various foundations and have produced the book replete with photographs, charts, maps, and other illustrations which describe the seized properties and assets and its current status. The Hrant Dink foundation states that 661 properties in Istanbul alone were confiscated by the Turkish government, leaving only 580 of the 1,328 properties owned by the 53 Armenian foundations (schools, churches, hospitals, etc.). The current circumstances of the remaining 87 could not be determined. Out of the 661 confiscated properties, 143 (21.6%) have been returned to the Armenian foundation.

The Hrant Dink Foundation researched confiscations and provided descriptions, photographs and boundary lines on its online interactive mapping resource.

Armenian properties in Istanbul

Immovable Assets (Real estate) in Istanbul by category	Quantity	Percentage
Total confiscated assets	661	49.77%
Conveyed to third parties	251	18.90%
Returned to original ownership (Note: e.g. Surp Prgich Armenian Hospital, Sanasarian Foundation)	143	10.77%
Non-existent parcels of real estate (Note: e.g. Kalfayan Orphanage and Pangalti Armenian Cemetery (no trace of the buildings or structure remains))	78	5.87%
Conveyed to the Municipality	64	4.82%
Conveyed to the Directorate General of Foundations (VGM) (Note: 'Vakif Genel Mudurlugu' (VGM) is a government organization that succeeds the Ottoman Ministry of Foundations. See "VGM: About Us". VGM: Official Website. Archived from the original on 1 October 2013.)	51	3.84%
Conveyed to the treasury	31	2.33%
Designated as public property	23	1.73%
Unassigned ownership	20	1.51%
Total unconfiscated assets	580	43.67%
Still owned by Armenian foundations	497	37.42%
Sold by Armenian foundations	83	6.25%
Immovable assets of indeterminate status	87	6.55%
Properties originally owned by the 53 Armenian foundations (schools, churches, hospitals, etc.)	1,328	100%

== Notable confiscations ==
Name	Confiscation	Current status
Mkhitaryan Bomonti Armenian School	In 1979, the State Charitable Foundations Directorate confiscated the Armenian School, stating that the new building was illegal because the school was not listed in the 1936 Declaration. The property was returned to the original owners whose heirs sold it to Militas Construction Company who closed it.	In November 2012, after numerous legal proceedings, the property was returned to the Armenian community.
Tuzla Armenian Children's Camp	The Gedikpaşa Church Foundation wanted to purchase the property but the State Charitable Foundations Directorate applied in court for its return to the previous owner in 1979. It was confiscated in 1983 and closed down in 1984. The property has changed ownership five times since closure but nothing has been built on the derelict site.	In 2001, the property was purchased by a businessman to build a house. When he was advised by the journalist Hrant Dink that it had belonged to an orphanage he offered to donate it back but the law did not permit it. In 2007 the new Foundation law was vetoed by President Ahmet Necdet Sezer. The Gedikpaşa Church Foundation has filed several unsuccessful cases, the most recent being in August 2011.
Andonyan Monastery	The monastery was built sometime in the 1860s. The monastery was described in a letter dated 24 June 1913 as a "house with garden and land located at 60 Ortaköy Pişmişoğlu Street (known as Çevirmeci Street today), leased from (icareli) the Sultan Beyazıt Veli Hazretleri Foundation, 9000 zira (approximately 5167 square meters), and previously leased (icareli) from the Ibrahim Pasha Foundation, 1000 zira (approximately 574 squaremeters)." The monastery was formally registered on 14 October 1913. With the last priest dying in 1924, the property was left vacant. Nevertheless, the title remained in the hands of the Armenian community during the 1936 declaration. On 23 February 1950, the land along with the monastery was rendered "ownerless" and was subsequently confiscated by the Treasury.	External videos: Video documentary describing the confiscation and current status of the Andonyan Monastery; A lawsuit was filed on 20 December 1966 against Istanbul Chamber of the Directorate of Law and the Treasury for unlawfully seizing the land and the building. The 15th Civil Court of Istanbul rejected the claims in 1974. Through renewed legal efforts by the Directorate General of Foundations in 2006, the property is now in the hands of the Directorate General of Foundations. Under current regulations, the monastery and its lands is considered a park. As a result, many offers of renting out the property by various businesses and companies were rejected.
Kalfayan Orphanage	The Orphanage School was founded by Srpuhi Kalfayan in 1865. It was expropriated and demolished in the 1960s to make way for infrastructure developments. An attempt to rebuild the orphanage in another location was deemed illegal under the 1974 law.	External videos: Video documentary describing the confiscation and current status of the Kalfayan Orphanage; The Orphanage School was forced to move to Uskudar where it is part of the Semerciyan School Premises.
Pangaltı Armenian Cemetery	In 1865, cholera forced the Ottoman government to ban burials at the Pangaltı cemetery and move them to the Şişli Armenian Cemetery. In the 1930s, the Pangaltı cemetery was confiscated and demolished. The site has been redeveloped with the Divan Hotel, Hilton Hotel, Hyatt Regency Hotel and TRT Radio Buildings. The marble tombstones were sold in 1939 and used for the construction of the Inönü Esplanade (today also called Taksim Gezi Park) and the Eminonu square.	External videos: Video documentary describing the confiscation and current status of the Pangalti Armenian Cemetery (in Turkish); In 1932, Mesrob Naroyan, the Armenian Patriarchate of Constantinople, filed a lawsuit for the return of the property, but the Istanbul Municipality argued that he had been a legal non-entity in Turkey since his exile during the Armenian genocide. Therefore, he had no title to the land, even though he still functioned at the Kumkapi headquarters in Istanbul. The Patriarchate acknowledged the lack of title, but argued legitimacy to represent the cemetery on behalf of both the Armenian Catholic Community and the Surp Agop Armenian Hospital. The commission to investigate land ownership found the Patriarch's claims groundless, so title remains with the Istanbul municipality and the third party owners.
Selamet Han	The Selamet Han, located in the Eminonu district of Istanbul, was built by architect Hovsep Aznavur and donated to the Surp Prgich Armenian Hospital by businessman Calouste Gulbenkian in 1954. The property was confiscated in 1974.	In February 2011, the Selamet Han was returned to the Surp Prgich Armenian Hospital. The director of the hospital, Bedros Sirinoglu, declared that the badly damaged building will be repaired and turned into a boutique hotel.
Kasımpaşa Surp Hagop Armenian Church and Surp Mesrobyan School	The Church was built in 1854 and the school in 1859 on property that the Armenian community had held for decades. On 9 May 1919, a fire destroyed both the Church and the school. On 3 May 1973, the State Charitable Foundations Directorate seized the property.	External videos: Video documentary describing the confiscation and current status of the Surp Hagop Church; The Church and School have been replaced by domestic residences. On 28 May 2012, the property was declared defunct by the Directorate General of Foundations. No civil suits have been filed.
Properties of Surp Prgich Armenian Hospital	In 1832, Harutyun Bezciyan built the Surp Prgich Armenian Hospital in the Yedikule district of Istanbul. It owned 19 properties that were confiscated, including: a building lot; a house and four shared lots in Sarıyer; a residential building in Moda; 2 residential buildings in Şişli; one flat in Beyoğlu; a store in Kapalıçarşı; a house in Uskudar; one apartment building, one flat and a warehouse in Kurtuluş; a four-storey hotel in Taksim; a retail and office commercial building in Beyoğlu; an apartment flat in Çamlica; a 47,500 sq. m. vacant lot in Beykoz; 44,000 sq. m. land adjacent to the hospital, formerly the gardens of the hospital, presently used as Zeytinburnu Stadium (confiscated by the Zeytinburnu Municipality in 1985); a sports building; a parking lot; a tea garden.	External videos: Video documentary describing the confiscation and current status of the IGS building, a property belonging to the Surp Prgich Hospital; In February 2011, after the successful acquisition of the Selamet Han, Bedros Sirinoglu, the president of the hospital, vowed to re-acquire all 19 properties. The hospital appealed to an Istanbul court which ruled in its favour by imposing an interim injunction on the 43,160 sq. m. estate (currently the Zeytinburnu Stadium) and the hospital. Sirinoglu has announced that the hospital has already received affirmative responses regarding seven of the 19 properties requested.
Ohannes Kasabian Estate. Çankaya Köşkü Presidential palace	The Çankaya Villa and vineyard in Ankara belonged to Ohannes Kasabian, a wealthy Armenian jeweller and merchant, until the Armenian genocide. After the Kasabian family escaped from Ankara to Istanbul it was confiscated and occupied by the Bulgurluzâde family. In 1921 Mustafa Kemal Atatürk, the future President, purchased it from Bulgurluzâde Tevfik Efendi for 4,500 Turkish lira.	No civil suits have been filed.
Incirlik Air Base; Claims of Rita Mahdessian, Alex Bakalian and Anais Haroutunian.	Part of the land on which the Incirlik Air Base is built was owned by Armenians who died in the Armenian genocide. In 2010, a lawsuit was filed which sought compensation for 122 acres (0.49 km^{2}), which accounts for approximately four percent of the total land coverage of Incirlik, by three Armenian Americans who claimed that the land belonged to them. One claimant states that in 1923, after the genocide, the land was seized by the Bank of Agriculture.	A US court accepted the case and granted Turkey 21 days to respond. The plaintiffs demanded $63 million from the confiscation as well as $100 million for the income accrued. In 2013 the case was dismissed under the political question doctrine.
Topkapi Armenian Cemetery (today's Ulker factory)	The Topkapi Armenian Cemetery was owned by the Surp Nigoghayos Armenian church and served the Armenian community from the 17–19th centuries. The last known burial was 7 April 1896. It was confiscated and taken over by Midhat Pasha who sold the tombstones. It has been sold to third parties such as Ulker who built a factory there in 1948.	All suits filed for return of the property failed, but there are renewed claims under the 2011 legislation.
Sanasarian College	Founded in 1881 by Armenian philanthropist Mkrtich Sanasarian, the Sanasarian College was an Armenian language higher education institution in the city of Erzurum under the Ottoman Empire. The school operated until the Armenian genocide, when most teachers were killed and the buildings ruined. The building was then used as the gathering place for the Erzurum Congress.	On 14 March 2012, the acting Armenian Patriarchate of Istanbul Aram Ateşyan, appealed to a high court in Ankara for the return of Sanasarian College. The properties include nine plots of land in Erzurum; a garden house and farmland in the village of Aghveren; two plots in the village of Gez; and a large commercial property known as Sanasarian Han in the Sirkeci district of Istanbul. Court proceedings are still pending.
Diyarbakir Airport	A military airbase and public airport located in Diyarbakır. In 2012, an Armenian American named Zuart Sudjian claimed that she held the land deed to the property of the airport and owned the right of its inheritance. She stated that the land once belonged to the Basmacıyan family, a relative of hers, and was expropriated from them after they were deported during the Armenian genocide. It was then reported that the property was appropriated by the state when cadastral work was ongoing.	Zuart Sudjian filed a lawsuit through her lawyer Ali Elbeyoğlu for the return of the lands. The Diyarbakır 5th Civil Court of First Instance in April 2013 rejected the case on the grounds of it exceeding the statute of limitations. The case was subsequently taken to the Court of Cassation where the verdict of the local court is being appealed.

== See also ==
- Anti-Armenian sentiment in Turkey
- Armenian genocide reparations
- Varlık Vergisi
- Armenian cultural heritage in Turkey
- Human rights in Turkey
- Destroyed Armenian churches in Turkey
