= Kalfayan =

Kalfayan is a surname. Notable people with the surname include:

- Christophe Kalfayan (born 1969), French swimmer
- Krikor Kalfayan (1873–1949), Ottoman-born American writer, lecturer, musician, and musicologist
- Srpuhi Kalfayan (1822–1889), Armenian nun
- Zareh Kalfayan (1887–1939), Ottoman painter of Armenian descent
