= Tekâlif-i Milliye =

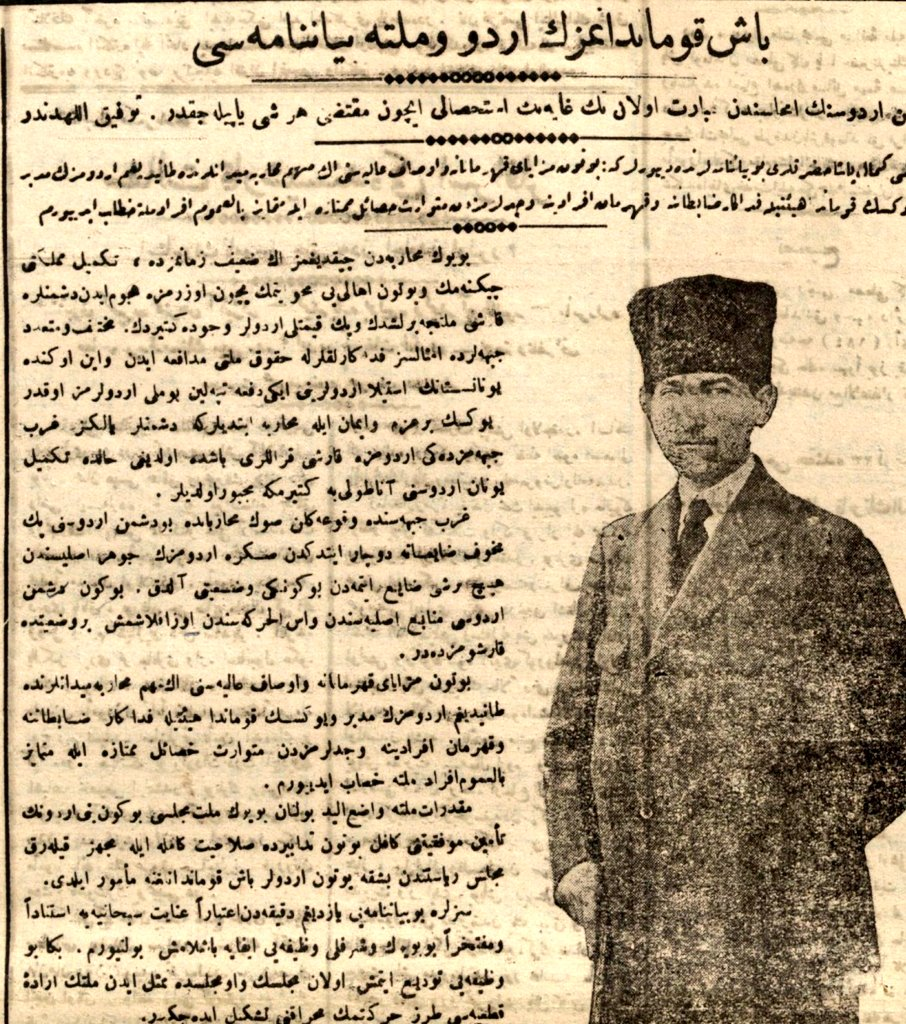
A contemporary announcement about the Tekâlif-i Milliye orders in the newspaper Hâkimiyet-i Milliye, August 1921.

Tekâlif-i Milliye (lit. 'National Obligations') was a series of ten compulsory requisition orders issued by Mustafa Kemal Pasha in Anatolia on 7–8 August 1921, during the Greco-Turkish War (1919–1922). The orders required civilians to surrender property and supplies to support the Turkish National Movement.

75% of the confiscated property belonged to deported Ottoman Greeks and Ottoman Armenians, who were deliberately denied compensation, unlike Muslim property owners. It took place during the Armenian and Greek genocides.

== Background ==
After the Turkish defeat in the Battle of Kütahya–Eskişehir in July 1921, the Nationalist army withdrew east of the Sakarya River. The Greek advance towards Ankara put the Nationalist government under considerable pressure. The army was short of food, clothing, transport equipment and other supplies needed to continue the war.

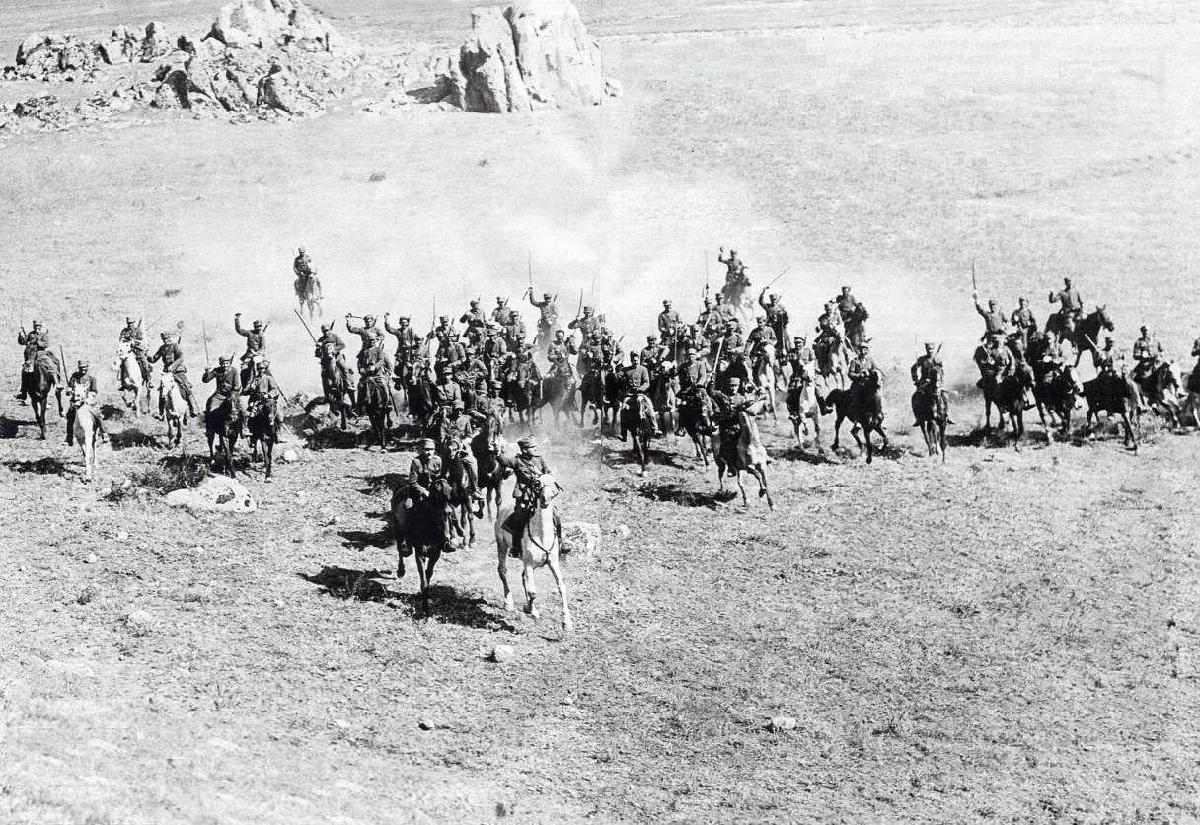
Greek cavalry charge during the Battle of Kütahya–Eskişehir.

On 5 August 1921, the Grand National Assembly of Turkey appointed Mustafa Kemal commander-in-chief and gave him extensive emergency powers. Two days later, he issued the first Tekâlif-i Milliye orders under the legislative authority granted to him by the Assembly. The orders were made public initially through local newspapers, which also published instructions concerning the way the implementation was to be carried out.

The orders placed much of the burden of supplying the army on civilians. Households, merchants, craftsmen, farmers and owners of transport equipment had to surrender supplies or provide services for military use.

== Requisition orders ==
Members of a Tekâlif-i Milliye delegation from Bolu that brought requisitioned supplies to the Battle of Sakarya.

The ten orders imposed the following obligations:

1. National Obligations Commissions were to be established in each district to collect supplies and arrange their delivery to the army. Commission members had to serve without pay.
2. Every household had to provide clothing, a pair of socks and a pair of traditional leather shoes. If poorer households could not meet this requirement, the commissions could demand additional articles from wealthier households.
3. Forty percent of specified stocks of textiles, leather, footwear and other clothing materials were to be requisitioned. Payment was promised at a later date.
4. Forty percent of specified stocks of food and other necessities, including wheat, flour, barley, sugar, oil and soap, were to be requisitioned on the same terms.
5. Owners of transport vehicles had to provide unpaid military transport once a month for journeys of up to 100 kilometres.
6. Abandoned goods and foodstuffs suitable for military use were to be confiscated and registered.
7. Privately owned weapons and ammunition suitable for military use had to be surrendered within three days.
8. Forty percent of specified stocks of fuel, lubricants, tyres, electrical equipment and related materials were to be requisitioned.
9. Craftsmen, workshops and factories were to be registered, and their capacity to produce military supplies was to be assessed.
10. Twenty percent of specified civilian transport vehicles and animals, including carts, horses, oxen, mules and other pack animals, were to be requisitioned.

Some of the requisitioned property was treated as a compulsory loan to the government. Owners were given receipts stating its estimated value. Other obligations, including household contributions and unpaid transport services, carried no equivalent immediate compensation.

== Enforcement ==
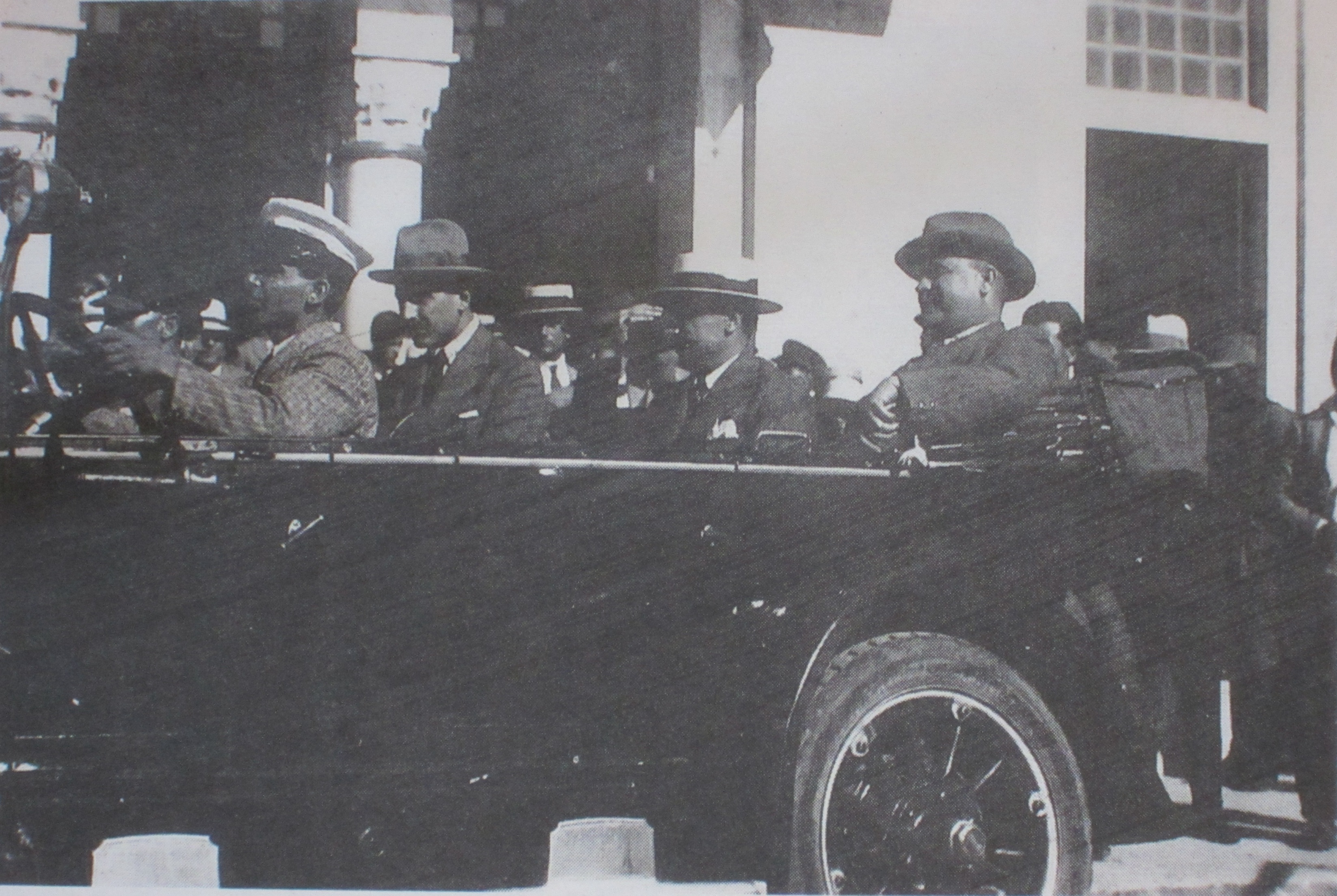
Members of an Independence Tribunal photographed in 1926. These courts also operated in 1921, sentencing alleged "traitors" who refused to give over their property to the government.

The orders were enforced by the "National Obligations Commissions". Their members were local civilian, military and commercial representatives, who were responsible for recording, valuing, collecting and transferring supplies to the army. Compliance was strictly compulsory, with the so-called "Independence Tribunals" having jurisdiction over violations of the orders, and officials confiscating goods that owners had failed to declare.

People who failed to declare their property were threatened with confiscation and prosecution for alleged "treason". Historian Mehmet Kayıran also records abuses, including collective fines against villages and neighbourhoods and punishments involving the destruction of property.

The orders were a heavy burden on a civilian population that was already impoverished. People had to surrender food, agricultural produce, livestock, clothing and transport equipment, and provide services without pay.

== Confiscation of Greek and Armenian property ==
The Çankaya Mansion, originally owned by an Armenian family, became Mustafa Kemal's residence from 1921 onwards.

The sixth Tekâlif-i Milliye order allowed National Obligations Commissions to confiscate abandoned goods and foodstuffs suitable for military use. The commissions had to record the quantities taken, estimate their value and keep records of the confiscated property.

The order covered property belonging to Greeks and Armenians who had been forcibly displaced from their homes. Historian Ümit Kurt states that the confiscation of these assets helped finance the Nationalist war effort. In a 2014 interview with Jadaliyya, Kurt said that abandoned Armenian property was an important source of funds during the war against Greece.

The requisitions were part of the confiscation and redistribution of Greek and Armenian property during the late Ottoman and early Republican periods. According to Kurt, the Nationalist government continued to dispossess these communities through laws that prevented their return and the recovery of their property.

=== Continuity with earlier confiscation policies ===
The requisitions to the "National Economy" of the Committee of Union and Progress. Historians have argued that the Nationalist authorities continued these genocidal policies, particularly by refusing to recognize the claims of displaced Greeks and Armenians for compensation. The confiscation of these properties were part of the economic basis of the Turkish Nationalist Movement, with them also being distributed to Muslim refugees, government officials and local elites, as part of the Turkification of the economy.

== Discriminatory compensation policies ==
=== Government refusal to compensate Greeks and Armenians ===
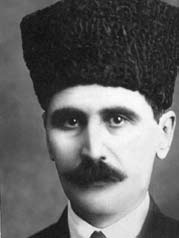
Hasan Fehmi Bey, former Turkish finance minister.

In April 1923, the government passed a law for the repayment of National Obligations debts. Outstanding requisition receipts were discussed again in parliament in 1924, when the government considered legislation on Treasury debts dating from 1908 to 1923.

During a closed parliamentary session, former finance minister Hasan Fehmi Bey acknowledged that a large share of the unpaid requisition receipts belonged to displaced Greeks and Armenians. He said that claims held by non-Muslims in the Anatolian interior amounted to about 400,000–500,000 liras and that none of those debts had been paid.

Today, in my estimation, just in the interior of Anatolia, there is probably not less than four or five hundred thousand liras in the hands of non-Muslims. Up until today not a single one of these [debts] has been given [paid back] or has been settled.

— Hasan Fehmi Bey, former finance minister, 1924 closed parliamentary proceedings

Hasan Fehmi admitted that the government had devised a legal formula to prevent Greeks and Armenians from receiving compensation. He explained that the law could not name the two communities openly and that several wordings had been considered before a suitable provision was found.

The minister spoke very candidly since the discussion was in a closed session. He said, A remedy has been thought of so that the Greeks [and] Armenians do not benefit from the worth of these National Tax Obligations official receipts. However, we were not able to say this openly as Greek and Armenian. Various forms and formulas were written. Investigations were conducted in various manners. Finally, we found this least objectionable or unobjectionable method.

— Hasan Fehmi Bey, former finance minister, 1924 closed parliamentary proceedings

The exclusion was deliberate. The law was written in general terms, but its purpose was to deny compensation to Greek and Armenian creditors, as they were the intended targets of the law.

The government also sent secret instructions to provincial financial officials stating that the restrictions applied only to Greeks and Armenians. Officials were told to delay claims by announcing investigations or inquiries until the legal period for pursuing them had expired.

Konya deputy Refik Bey confirmed that he and the finance minister had agreed to send out these secret instructions. Refik later acknowledged that their objective had been achieved.

We met with the minister of the treasury too. After promising that we would issue a secret communication, we accepted this article. [...] the intention was realized.

— Refik Bey, deputy for Konya, 1924 closed parliamentary proceedings

The parliamentary proceedings show that the government intended to deny Greek and Armenian creditors payment. The policy was carried out through legislation and secret administrative instructions, although the creditors had official receipts for the debts.

== Financial burden and repayment ==
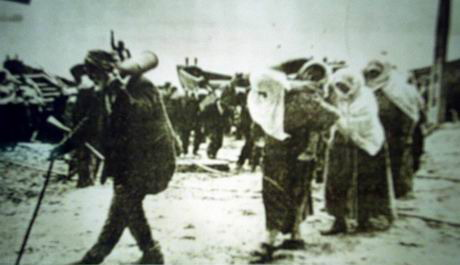
Civilians made to transport ammunition to the front.

The army received large quantities of civilian supplies through the requisitions. By the end of November 1921, more than 16,000 tonnes of wheat, 14,000 tonnes of barley and 1,800 tonnes of flour had been collected. The authorities also collected hundreds of thousands of items of clothing, as well as transport equipment and livestock.

According to Kurt, Finance Minister Hasan Fehmi reported that the total value of the National Obligations was 6,361,634 Turkish liras. About 75% of this amount was still unpaid at the time of his statement. Turkish historian M. Akif Tural gives a different figure of 6,003,663 liras. According to Tural, 72.3% of the recorded debts were repaid in 1923, and the rest had been settled by the end of 1929. Greeks and Armenians, however, were prevented from collecting their claims.

== Historical assessment ==
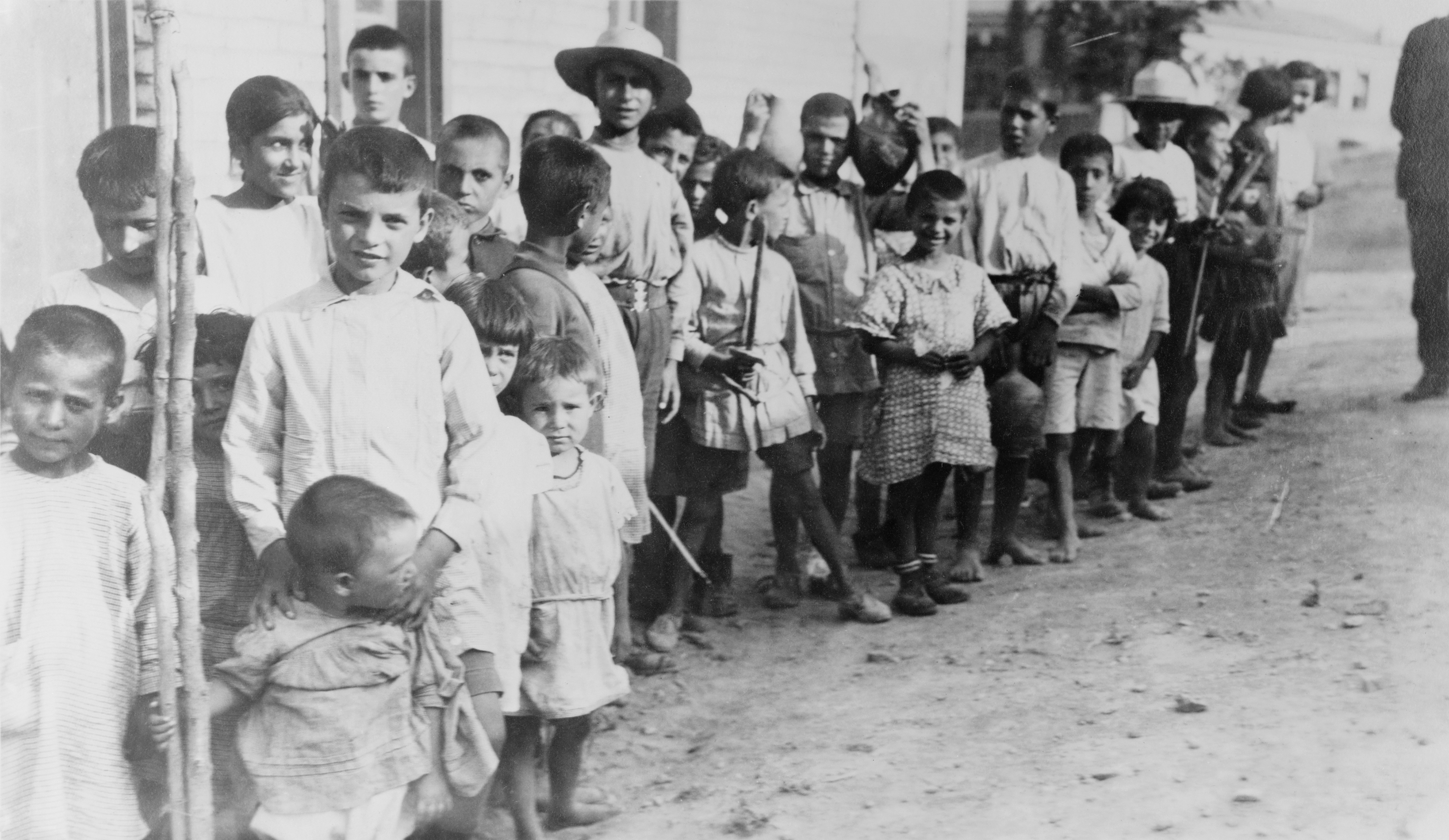
Greek and Armenian refugee children near Athens in 1923.

Historian Sait Çetinoğlu regards the Tekâlif-i Milliye and the subsequent refusal to compensate Christian creditors as features of the discriminatory political system established during the foundation of the Turkish Republic. In his review of Taner Akçam's study, Çetinoğlu esto,atesthat 75% of the requisition debts were owed to Greeks and Armenians and notes how the decision to withhold payment was made in secret parliamentary sessions.

Historian Ümit Kurt also concludes from the parliamentary proceedings that Greek and Armenian creditors were deliberately excluded from repayment. He describes the secret instructions sent to provincial officials and the laws used to prevent displaced Christians from collecting their claims. Later, laws passed by the Nationalist and Republican governments prevented displaced Greeks and Armenians from returning home and recovering their assets.

Historian Ellinor Morack states that the Tekâlif-i Milliye greatly improved the Nationalist government's financial position in the summer of 1921, shortly before the Battle of Sakarya. Furthermore, historian Anahit Astoyan argues that the Nationalist movement's eventual victory was financed in part by landowners, merchants and military officers who had enriched themselves through the confiscation of Armenian property.

== See also ==
- Turkification

== Sources ==
- Astoyan, Anahit (23 April 2014). "Ankara's Financial Obligation: Today's Turkey Created on Wealth Expropriated from Armenians". Hetq.
- Çetinoğlu, Sait (8 June 2009). "Ermeni Emval-i Metrukeleri Üzerine". Birikim (in Turkish).
- Çetinoğlu, Sait (10 January 2024). "Yüz Yıllık Apartheid". Birikim (in Turkish).
- Kayıran, Mehmet (1989). "Tekalif-i Milliye Emirleri ve Uygulanışı". Atatürk Araştırma Merkezi Dergisi (in Turkish). 5 (15): 639–664.
- Kurt, Ümit (24 April 2014). "The Confiscation of Armenian Properties: An Interview with Umit Kurt". Jadaliyya. Interviewed by Varak Ketsemanian.
- Kurt, Ümit (2024). "The Fate of Armenian and Greek Properties in the Post-First World War Period". Journal of Balkan and Near Eastern Studies. 26 (2): 164–182. doi:10.1080/19448953.2023.2233363. hdl:1959.13/1505328.
- Morack, Ellinor (2017). The Dowry of the State? The Politics of Abandoned Property and the Population Exchange in Turkey, 1921–1945. University of Bamberg Press. doi:10.20378/irb-41509. ISBN 978-3-86309-463-8.
- Tural, M. Akif (1995). "Tekâlif-i Milliye (Halka Borcu Kalmayan Devlet)". Atatürk Araştırma Merkezi Dergisi (in Turkish). 11 (32): 535–559.
- Yılmaz, Mehmet Serhat (2023). "Tekâlif-i Milliye Konulu Bir Kaynak: Kastamonu Menzil Müfettişliği Zahire Deposu Defteri (18 Eylül 1921–31 Ocak 1922)". Sakarya Zaferi ve Haymana V (PDF) (in Turkish). pp. 451–478.
