= Harutiun Bezjian =

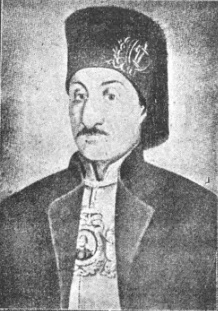
Harutyun Bezdjian

Harutyun Amira Bezciyan (Armenian: Յարութիւն Պէզճեան; April 10, 1771 in Istanbul, Ottoman Empire - January 3, 1834 in Istanbul, Ottoman Empire) also known as Kazaz Artin Armenian: Գազազ Արթին was a philanthropist, merchant, financier, adviser, and founder of the Sourp Prgich Armenian Hospital.

== Biography ==
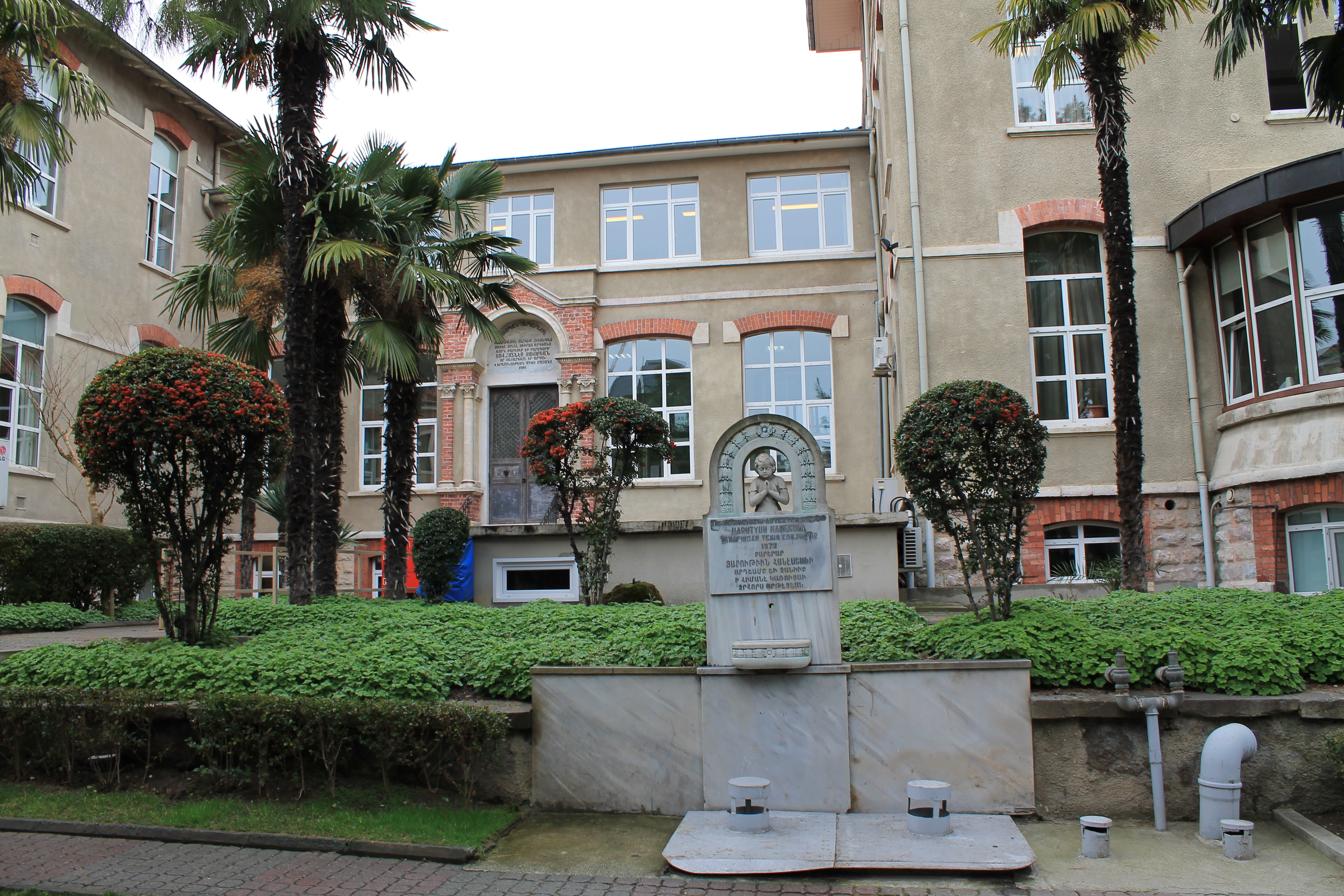
Surp Prgiç Armenian Hospital founded by Harutyun Bezciyan

Harutyun Bezciyan was born in the Yenikapı district to a family of Armenian descent. He graduated from the local Kumkapı Armenian School and started working in the silk trade business with his father. He soon began to become familiar with the Ottoman Palace while working with the prestigious Düzyan Family, an Armenian family in charge of the Ottoman mint. After gaining the trust from various high ranking Ottoman officials, he then became Mahmud the Second's economic and personal adviser. Through the approval of Mahmud II, Bezciyan rose through the ranks and became the manager of mint of the Ottoman treasury.

He started the biggest donation project for Armenian Patriarchate Building, Patriarchal Cathedral and the Holy Asdvadzazin Church. He is the founder of several Armenian girls schools in Beyoğlu as well as the Bezciyan school, Arakelots Azkayin, Boğosyan, Varvaryan, Bezciyan in Topkapı and Eyüphan.

Holy Prgiç Hospital which Bezciyan started but couldn't finish was one of his grandest and important philanthropic projects.

He was buried to Holy Harutyun in the Virgin Mary Patriarch Cathedral by the special permission of Mahmud II.

== Legacy ==
Armenian writer Ara Aginyan has written a novel called Hağtanagi Campan (The road to victory) about Harutyun Bezciyan's life.

The Armenian Bezciyan Private School founded by Harutyun Bezciyan in the Kumkapi district of Istanbul still bears his name.
