= Armenian genocide reparations =

The issue of Armenian genocide reparations derives from the Armenian genocide of 1915 committed by the Ottoman Empire. Such reparations might be of financial, estate or territorial nature, and could cover individual or collective claims as well as those by Armenia. The majority of scholars of international law agree that Turkey is the successor state or continuation of the Ottoman Empire. In addition, the Republic of Turkey continued the Ottoman Empire's internationally wrongful acts against Armenians, such as confiscation of Armenian properties and massacres. Former Secretary of the UN Human Rights Committee, Professor Alfred de Zayas, Geneva School of Diplomacy, stated that "[b]ecause of the continuing character of the crime of genocide in factual and legal terms, the remedy of restitution has not been foreclosed by the passage of time".

== Historical background ==
=== The aftermath of the Armenian genocide ===
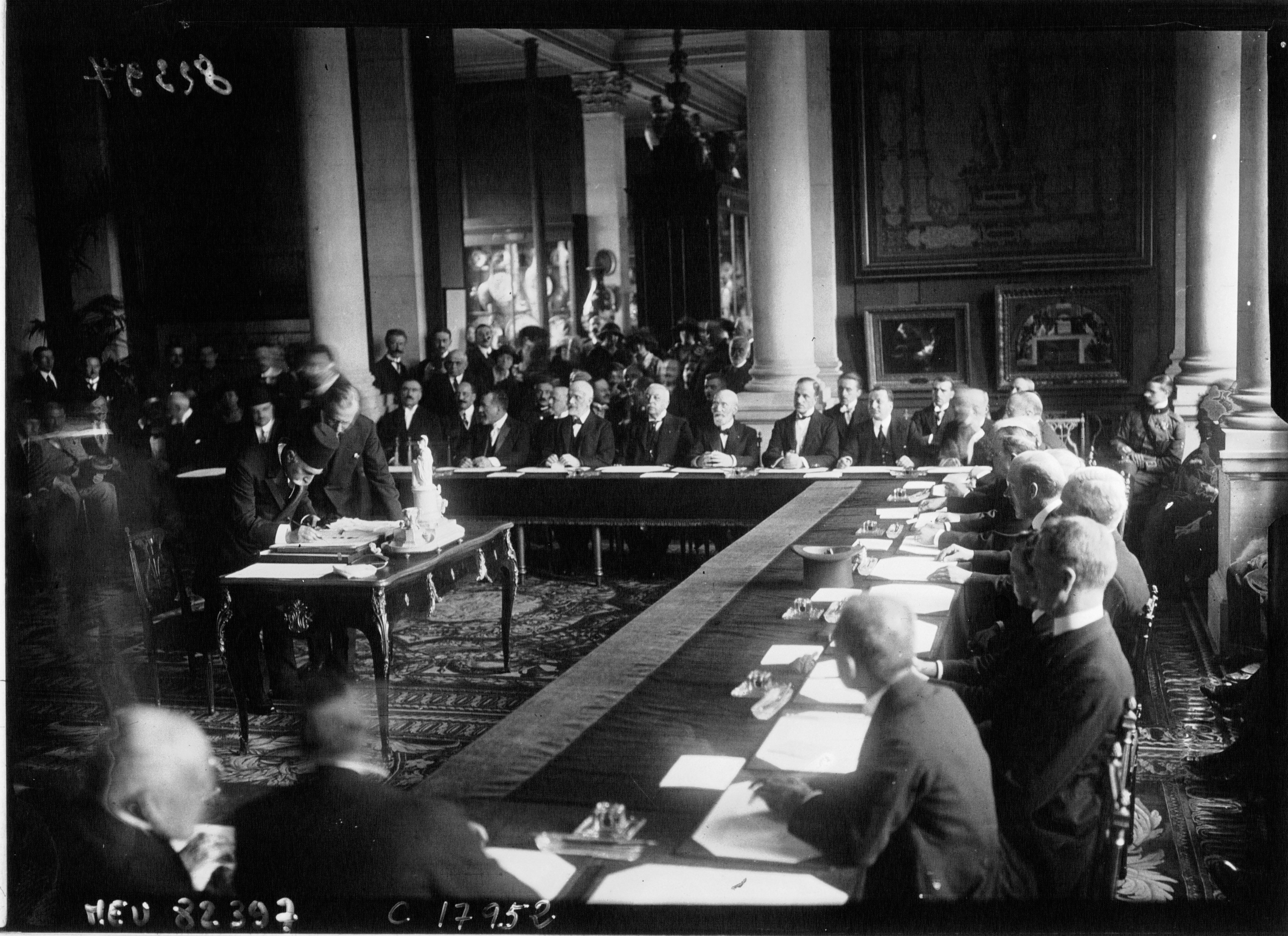
The Ottoman representative, Mehmed Hâdî Pasha, signs the Treaty of Sèvres.

Apart from the one to one and a half million deaths, Armenians lost all their wealth and property and received neither compensation nor reparations. Businesses and farms were lost, and all schools, churches, hospitals, orphanages, monasteries, and graveyards became Turkish state property. In January 1916, the Ottoman Minister of Commerce and Agriculture issued a decree ordering all financial institutions operating within the empire's borders to turn over Armenian assets to the government. It is recorded that as much as 6 million Turkish gold pounds were seized along with real property, cash, bank deposits, and jewelry. The assets were then funneled to European banks, including Deutsche and Dresdner banks.

After the end of World War I, genocide survivors tried to return and reclaim their former homes and assets, but were driven out by the Turkish National Movement.

=== Treaty of Sèvres ===
The punishment of the crime of the Armenian massacres, as well as the obligation to make restitution to the survivors were envisaged by the victorious Allies of World War I, and were included in the Peace Treaty of Sèvres, signed by the Ottoman Empire alike. The treaty contained not only a commitment to try Turkish officials for war crimes against the Allied Nationals, but also for crimes committed against subjects of the Ottoman Empire of different ethnic origin, in particular the Armenians, concluded in the texts as crime against humanity. Furthermore, the so-called "Just Ruling of Woodrow Wilson (the US President at that time)" by the Treaty of Sèvres recognized an Armenian state much larger than the current Republic of Armenia by determining its Western borders in the Armenian Highlands and Asia Minor. While it was never ratified, there can be found individuals, historians, organisations, or politicians that share the thoughts of Henry C. Theriault (Ph.D. in philosophy from the University of Massachusetts) specializing in social and political philosophy; he thinks:

...some of its elements retain the force of law and the treaty itself is not superseded by the 1923 Treaty of Lausanne. In particular, the fixing of the proper borders of an Armenian state was undertaken pursuant to the treaty and determined by a binding arbitral award. Regardless of whether the treaty was ultimately ratified, the committee process determining the arbitral award was agreed to by the parties to the treaty and, according to international law, the resulting determination has legal force regardless of the ultimate fate of the treaty. This means that, under international law, the “Wilsonian boundaries” are the proper boundaries of the Armenian state that should exist in Asia Minor today.

=== Treaties of Alexandropol and Kars ===
The Treaty of Sèvres was superseded by the Turkish–Armenian War of 1920. The following Treaty of Alexandropol stipulated that Armenia renounce the terms of the Treaty of Sèvres and its associated promises of awarding land from the region of "Western Armenia" to the Republic of Armenia, and declared the Treaty of Sèvres to be null and void. Because of the Soviet invasion of Armenia before the signing of the Treaty of Alexandropol, the Armenian parliament never had the chance to ratify it. The Treaty of Kars replaced the Treaty of Alexandropol in 1921; the newly formed Armenian Soviet Socialist Republic affirmed all of the terms of the previous Treaty of Alexandropol in the new treaty. The Treaty of Kars was ratified in Yerevan in fall 1922 by the unrecognized Soviet and Turkish governments.

After World War II, Stalin attempted to annul the Treaty of Kars and regain the lands ceded to Turkey. The Soviet claims were backed by much of the international Armenian diaspora, as well as the Armenian Revolutionary Federation. Armenian leaders attempted to gather British and American support for the reclamation of eastern Anatolia from Turkey, but Winston Churchill objected to the Soviet and Armenian territorial claims. Likewise, the United States State Department backed Turkey as well, saying, as it had since 1934, that its previous support for Wilsonian Armenia had since expired. The Soviet Union dropped its claims against Turkey after Stalin's death in 1953.

== Reparation proposals ==
According to the former Foreign Minister of Armenia, Eduard Nalbandyan, Armenia has never issued a declaration regarding land claims since its independence. He also argues that there are legal ways for Armenians to reclaim their lost properties, with or without Turkish recognition of the Armenian genocide. However, various reparations proposals do exist. The view of Rouben Paul Adalian, Director of the Armenian National Institute in Washington is that, although reparations have never been granted by Turkey, the increasing recognition of the Armenian genocide by the international community and hence its eventual recognition by Turkey can lay a solid basis for the start of the reparation process.

Many Armenians demand a restoration of the Turkish-Armenian border as demarcated by former United States President Woodrow Wilson in the 1920 Treaty of Sèvres, and a hefty amount of cash reparations. Some demand a land corridor between Armenia and the Black Sea in order to ensure the long-term viability of the Armenian state, while others only want the symbolic inclusion of Mount Ararat in Armenia and a formal apology by Turkey. Ümit Kardaş, a retired Turkish military judge, proposes the unconditional opening of the Turkish-Armenian border, as well as an invitation by the Turkish state to all Armenians living in the diaspora to settle in their ancestral lands in Turkey.

According to a study made by the Armenian Genocide Reparations Study Group (AGRSG), reparations should be made according to the detailed reparations estimate made as part of the Paris Peace Conference of 1919, supplemented by additional calculations for elements not sufficiently covered by the conference's estimation of the material financial losses suffered by Armenians. The report also discusses multiple options regarding land return, from a symbolic return of church and other cultural properties in Turkey to full return of lands as designated in the Treaty of Sèvres. The report includes the very innovative option of allowing Turkey to retain political sovereignty over the lands in question but demilitarizing them and allowing Armenians to join present inhabitants with full political protection and business and residency rights.

== The issues of "holding responsible" ==
In the sense of responsibility for the genocide the issue can be separated into 2 major concepts: personal and state.

=== The issue of personal responsibility and “punishment” ===
It is an accepted principle of law, that criminal cases may be brought against living people only. In this scope criminal proceedings of this kind are currently impossible as the perpetrators are already dead. In this regard the possibility of involvement by International Criminal Court (ICC) seems impossible not only because of that, but also that by its regulations it has no retroactive jurisdiction.

This kind of proceeding already took place. The perpetrators were found guilty in the Turkish Courts-Martial of 1919–1920 in War Crimes and Crime against humanity, but the main culprits had been helped to escape and the process was halted because there was no international legal framework at that time. From the Malta exiles taken by the Allied forces headed by Britain that included more than 140 people in the aftermath of World War I, several suspected criminals were never tried. In 1921 some were returned in exchange for British POW. Right after that, most of the detainees were released after negotiations between Britain and the newly formed Ankara government of Atatürk. The trials were halted with the emergence of the Turkish National Movement and afterwards the new Kemalist government pardoned those who were serving their sentences in 1923.

=== The issue of "punishment" of the responsible state ===
In the modern International Law, however, the idea of criminal liability of states is affirmed. This way the Article 19 of the initial draft articles on state responsibility adopted by the International Law Commission (ILC) genocide was listed among the international crimes. Such an assertion opens the way for an international "punishment" of the state to which genocidal acts are attributed. This could be the case with Turkey if it is held responsible for the Armenian genocide. Despite this in the general frames of this draft the mechanisms, the level of responsibility and other factors are quite vague which explains the final deletion of the word "crime" from the draft of ILC and makes mention of an unclear "serious breach of an obligation arising under a pre-emptory norm of general international law".

According to some, there does not exist a proper mechanism to hold Turkey responsible for the damage caused to Armenians by the genocide. In this scope, according to Professor Richard Hovannisian, this kind of process is possible by the consent of the parties, and such an agreement or treaty between Armenia and Turkey does not exist. Neither does the exchange of optional clauses of compulsory jurisdiction in accordance with the International Court of Justice (ICJ). And so there is no institution or court, except for the European Court for Human Rights (ECHR), Turkey could be brought before without its own consent. The latter is an international but not an interstate court. It is established to decide the individual claims against the states on issues of European convention on human rights, which is not helpful in the issue of reparations. Turkey has a current offer to establish an international committee of historians to research and make a decision on the events of 1915.

== Dealing with the reparations ==
=== Grounds in international law ===
The United Nations Basic Principles and Guidelines on the Right to Reparation for Victims of Gross Violations of Human Rights and International Humanitarian Law provide in part:

Reparation may be claimed individually and where appropriate collectively, by the direct victims of violations of human rights and international humanitarian law, the immediate family, dependants or other persons or groups of persons closely connected with the direct victims.

While current members of Turkish society cannot be blamed morally for the destruction of Armenians, the present-day Turkish Republic, as the successor state to the Ottoman Empire and as beneficiary of the wealth and land expropriations brought forth through the genocide, is responsible for reparations. Professor de Zayas states the following:

The lands, buildings, bank accounts and other property of the Armenian communities in Turkey were systematically confiscated. Should there be no restitution for this act of mass theft, accompanying, as it did, the ultimate crime of genocide?

Pr. de Zayas states that the restitution of confiscated Armenian property remains a continuing State responsibility also because of Turkey's current human rights obligations under international treaty law, particularly the corpus of international human rights law.

Particularly important are Principles 9 and 12 that state that civil claims relating to reparations for gross violations of human rights and international humanitarian law shall not be subject to statutes of limitations (article 9), and that restitution shall be provided to re-establish the situation that existed prior to the violations of human rights or international humanitarian law. The restitution requires, inter alia - return to one's place of residence and restoration of property.

For reparations of gross violations of human rights, two other general principles are relevant: the principle of ex injuria non oritur jus (translation: from a wrong no right arises), meaning that no State should be allowed to profit from its own violations of law, and the principle of "unjust enrichment". It is a general principle of law that the criminal cannot keep the fruits of the crime.

=== Current legal mechanisms ===
Despite the recent large experience and advance in dealing with similar issues, there are ascertains that the existing legal background provides insufficient mechanisms for the resolution of the subject issue unless mutually agreed on one. There is little doubt that Turkey will join any discussion concerning its responsibility towards the victims . This can also be supplemented with facts that Armenia was nonexistent as an independent state at the time of the genocide and that the victims were mainly the subjects of the Ottoman Empire itself.

== Armenian organizations demanding reparations ==
=== Armenian Apostolic Church ===
- The Armenian Catholicosate of the Great House of Cilicia was centered in the city of Sis (modern-day Kozan, Adana in Turkey) since 1295. In 1921, the Ottoman government gave two days for Catholicos Sahak II Khabayan and the Armenian clergy to vacate the area. After a period of uncertainty, in 1930 the Catholicosate relocated to Antelias, Lebanon where it is headquartered to this day. On April 28, 2015, Armenian Church leaders launched legal action before Turkey's Constitutional Court to reclaim the historic headquarters of the Church, which includes the Catholicosate, the monastery and cathedral of St. Sophia. If the lawsuit fails, an appeal is planned at the European Court of Human Rights. The Catholicos of All Armenians, Karekin II has voiced his support and said that the Mother See of Holy Etchmiadzin in Armenia may take similar steps.

=== Armenian political parties ===
- The Armenian Revolutionary Federation is a political party established in 1890 in Tiflis, Georgia. The ARF possesses the largest number of members from the political parties present in the Armenian diaspora, and was also actively present in the political life of the Republic of Armenia by having representatives in the Parliament and by having participated in the ruling coalition. The party advocates the recognition of the Armenian genocide, as well as reparations. A section of its program called "General Theory" has recently been adapted to current concepts of socialism, democracy, and rights of self-determination. Among its goals are the international condemnation of the genocide committed by the Ottoman Empire against the Armenians, the return of occupied lands in accordance with the Sèvres Treaty, and just reparations to the Armenian nation.
- The Social-Democrat Hunchakian Party, another political party with many adherents in the Armenian diaspora, also supports worldwide recognition of the Armenian Genocide and necessary indemnification, essentially based on territorial rights. It supports the right of the Armenian people to return to their historic homeland as well as their right to self-determination.
- The Armenian Democratic Liberal Party, a third traditional Armenian political party, supports worldwide recognition and also the reparation by Turkey for the goods and assets of Armenians that were taken.

=== Defunct paramilitary organizations ===
- The Armenian Secret Army for the Liberation of Armenia (ASALA) was a Marxist-Leninist militant organization, that operated from 1975 to 1986. The stated intention of ASALA was "to compel the Turkish government to publicly acknowledge its responsibility for the deaths of 1.5 million Armenians in 1915, pay reparations, and cede territory for an Armenian homeland". The territory to be ceded would be the area promised to the Armenians at the never-ratified Treaty of Sèvres in 1920 by US President Woodrow Wilson, "Wilsonian Armenia".
- The Justice Commandos Against Armenian Genocide (JCAG) was another paramilitary organization that operated in various Western nations from 1975 to 1983. It sought the recognition of the Armenian genocide by the Republic of Turkey and the establishment of an independent Armenia. In order to achieve its aims, it conducted a campaign of assassinations targeting Turkish diplomats around the world. JCAG's activities were concentrated in European and North American countries targeting Turkish interests.
- The Armenian Revolutionary Army (ARA) is another defunct Armenian guerrilla organization that had similar aims. It is claimed that the Armenian Revolutionary Army (ARA) that began operating in 1983, was simply JCAG renamed.

=== Other organizations ===
- The Armenian National Committee of South America (CNA) said that "Turkey must return territories to Armenia, according to the terms issued by the President of the United States Woodrow Wilson", despite the superseding Treaties of Alexandropol and Kars signed by Armenia and Turkey confirming the current borders between the two countries.
- Collectif 2015; In France, a Collective of descendants of the survivors of the Armenian genocide prepared a demand addressed to the Turkish State.The work is published on www.collectif2015.org website.

== Recent developments ==
=== Lawsuits ===
==== Against financial institutions ====
California-based lawyers Brian S. Kabateck of Kabateck LLP, Vartkes Yeghiayan, Mark J. Geragos, and William Shernoff filed a series of lawsuits against American and European financial institutions in order to recover Armenian assets and insurance compensations.

- In July 2004, after California Legislature passed the Armenian Genocide Insurance Act, descendants of Armenian genocide victims settled a case for about 2400 life insurance policies from New York Life written on Armenians living in the Ottoman Empire. Some of the life insurance policies were written as early as 1875, but were not paid after the Genocide. Around 1916–1918, the Turkish government attempted to recover for the people it had killed with the argument that there are no identifiable heirs to the policy holders, but did not succeed. The settlement provided 20 million dollars, of which 11 million was for heirs of the Genocide victims.
- In 2005, the French insurance company AXA was also accused of not paying compensations to the descendants of those who perished during the Armenian genocide. After a class-action lawsuit, it agreed to pay 17 million dollars to descendants and Armenian philanthropic groups. In March 2010, the company provided life insurance premiums to 1,000 families of descendants of Armenians killed in 1915.
- In 2006, descendants of the Armenian genocide filed a class action lawsuit against Deutsche Bank and Dresdner Bank which seeks the recovery of millions of dollars of money and property withheld by the two German banks after the Armenian genocide. The lawsuit asserts that the banks profited from the 1915 atrocities in order to conceal and prevent the recovery of assets belonging to Armenian families. The banks' cooperation has been limited.

==== Against the Getty museum ====
On June 1, 2010, the Western Prelacy of the Armenian Apostolic Church of America has sued the J. Paul Getty Museum to demand the return of seven pages ripped from a sacred Armenian Bible dating back to 1256 as well as damages of 35 million dollars. According to the Western Prelacy, the seven pages were ripped from the Armenian Church's Zeyt'un Gospels during the genocide. The Zeyt'un Gospels were illustrated by Toros Roslin, and the rest of the sacred book is located at the Matenadaran in Yerevan, Armenia. According to the Getty, the museum legally acquired the pages, which is known as the Canon Tables, in 1994 from an anonymous private collector "after a thorough review of their provenance." Michael Bazyler, a Chapman University law professor and member of the plaintiff's legal team, believes this is the first case filed in the United States for the return of cultural or religious objects taken around the time of World War I.

==== Against the Turkish government and two banks ====
On July 29, 2010, Armenian-American lawyers filed a federal lawsuit against the Turkish government, the Central Bank of the Republic of Turkey and Ziraat Bankası, seeking compensation for the descendants of Armenians whose property was allegedly seized during the Armenian genocide. The plaintiffs are Garbis Davouyan of Los Angeles and Hrayr Turabian of Queens. The suit - the first directed against the government of the Republic of Turkey - alleges breach of statutory trust, unjust enrichment, human rights violations and violations of international law. It seeks compensation for land, buildings and businesses allegedly seized from Armenians along with bank deposits and property, including priceless religious and other artifacts, some of which are now kept in museums in the Republic of Turkey. The lawsuit claims more than a million Armenians were killed in forced marches, concentration camps and massacres "perpetrated, assisted and condoned" by Turkish officials and armed forces. Lawyers for the plaintiffs think that records of the properties and profits still exist, and they are seeking an accounting that could reach billions of dollars. The case was denied & dismissed in 2013.

=== Ankara Conference ===
Starting April 24, 2010, a two-day conference entitled "The Armenian Issue: What is to be done and how?", organized by the Ankara Freedom of Thought Initiative, took place in Ankara and was held under tight security measures. For the first time in Turkey, subjects such as confiscated Armenian property, reparations, and the challenges of confronting the past and moving forward were discussed. 200 people, mostly genocide recognition supporters attended the conference. Some of those present were Turkish and Western intellectuals such as Sevan Nişanyan of the Istanbul-based Armenian newspaper Agos, Welsh writer-activist Eilan Williams, Worcester State University philosopher Henry Theriault, and author Temel Demirer. As the conference quickly turned into a debate on Armenian genocide reparations, the latter three supported them, while Nişanyan did not.

=== Bill in the Armenian parliament ===
On April 26, 2010, a draft resolution submitted to the Armenian National Assembly by the ARF criminalizes the denial of the Armenian genocide and raises the reparations issue. Key parliamentary forces largely supported the bill. Larisa Alaversyan of the opposition Heritage Party says that the adoption of the bill would create further precedent for Armenia's application to an international court on the issue. The head of Prosperous Armenia’s parliamentary faction, Aram Safaryan, as well as Hovhannes Margaryan of the Rule of Law faction similarly supported the initiative.

== See also ==
- Armenian genocide in culture
- Confiscated Armenian Properties in Turkey
- Reparations Agreement between Israel and West Germany
- Reparations for slavery
- World War I reparations
- 100th anniversary of the Armenian genocide
- Repatriation of Armenians
