= Ümit Kurt (historian) =

Turkish historian

Ümit Kurt is a historian who studies the modern Middle East. Many of his publications are about the Armenian genocide. In 2016, he received a PhD in Armenian genocide studies from Clark University. Kurt is a Turkish citizen ethnically of Kurdish and Arab origin; he was born and grew up in Gaziantep.

In the Fall of 2024, Kurt was a Fellow at the Swedish Collegium for Advanced Study in Uppsala, Sweden.

== Works ==
- Kurt, Ümit (2012). "Türk'ün Büyük, Biçare Irkı" Türk Yurdu'nda Milliyetçiliğin Esasları (1911-1916) [The Great, Hopeless Turkish Race: Fundamentals of Turkish Nationalism in the Turkish Homeland, 1911-1916] (in Turkish). Iletişim. ISBN 9789750510397.
- Akçam, Taner; Kurt, Ümit (2015). The Spirit of the Laws: The Plunder of Wealth in the Armenian Genocide. Berghahn Books. ISBN 978-1-78238-624-7.
- Kurt, Ümit; Sarafian, Ara (January 1, 2020). Armenians and Kurds in the Late Ottoman Empire. The Press at California State University, Fresno. ISBN 978-0912201627.
- Kurt, Ümit (2021). The Armenians of Aintab: The Economics of Genocide in an Ottoman Province. Harvard University Press. ISBN 978-0-674-24794-9.
