= Gedikpaşa Surp Hovhannes Church =

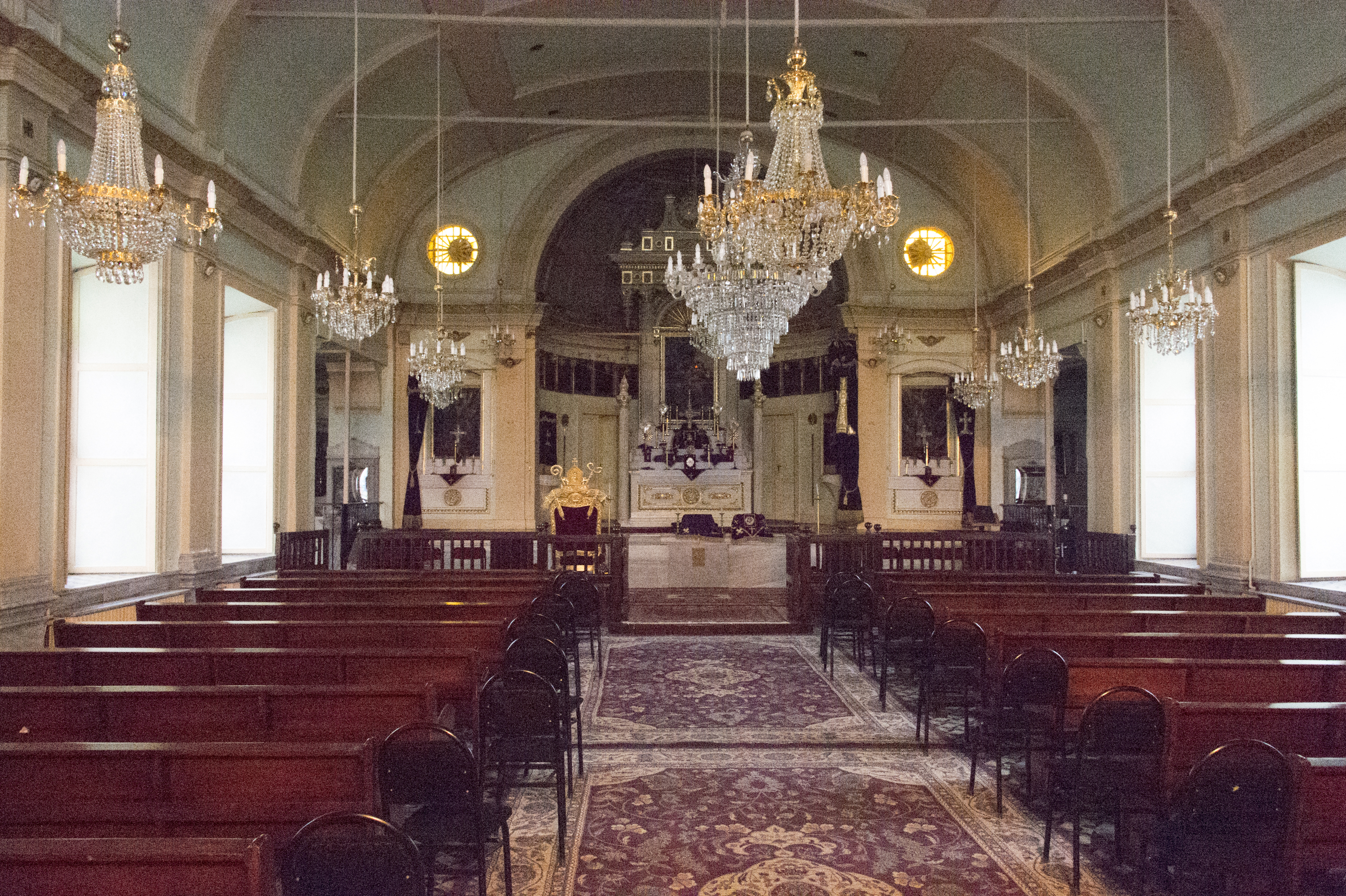
- Interior of the church

- Location within Istanbul Fatih
- 41.005910°N 28.967398°EI
- Location: Fatih, Istanbul
- Country: Turkey
- Denomination: Armenian Apostolic

Architecture
- Completed: 1827

Administration
- District: Fatih

Surp Hovhannes Church (Armenian: Սուրբ Յովհաննէս Եկեղեցի) is an Armenian church in Gedikpaşa neighbourhood Fatih, Istanbul built in 1827.

== History ==
The church, which was burnt down in 1849, was restored in 1876 with the edict of Sultan Abdulaziz, and was reopened for worship in 1895. The church, which was restored again in 1950, had to be restored again in 1972 due to an occurrence of another fire, in which the building got affected heavily, and in 1986 it was completely restored and opened for worship by the Armenian Patriarch of Istanbul Shenork I Kaloustian. Finally, the church was restored in 2006 and was opened for worship by Patriarch Mesrob II.

The Surp Mesrobyan School next to the church opened in 1835 was closed in 1982 due to lack of students.
