= Srpuhi Kalfayan =

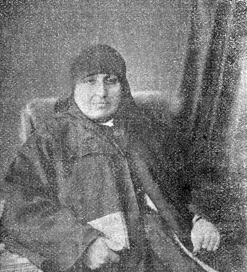
Srpuhi Mayrabed Nshan Kalfayan (1822-1889)

Srpuhi Mayrabed Nshan Kalfayan (Armenian: Սրբուհի Մայրապետ Նշան Գալֆաեան; February 17, 1822, in Kartal, Istanbul – July 4, 1889, in Hasköy, Istanbul) was an Armenian nun and founder of the Order of Kalfayan, plus a school and an orphanage for girls in Constantinople.

== Biography ==
Kalfayan vowed to become a nun at the age of 12 when she lost her father, and she achieved it in 1840.

Kalfayan founded both the Order of Kalfayan and, in 1850, a school for girls which still stands today, though it now accepts boys as well. In 1865 she mobilized financial support for the victims of a cholera epidemic and on 1 January 1866 she opened an orphanage for girls in Hasköy, Constantinople.

== Death and commemoration ==
Kalyfan died on 4 July 1889.

Her name is commemorated in the Kalfayan Elementary School.

== See also ==
- Confiscated Armenian properties in Turkey
