= Krikor Kalfayan =

Armenian musicologist and composer (1873–1949)

Krikor Proff Kalfayan (Armenian: Գրիգոր Քալֆայան; 1873–1949) was an Armenian writer, lecturer, musician, and musicologist.

== Life ==
Of Armenian descent, Krikor Kalfayan was born in Bursa, Ottoman Empire in 1873. His father was an architect. Krikor Kalfayan attained his primary education at the local Armenian school. He eventually moved to Constantinople where he continued his education at the prestigious Getronagan Lyceum. Kalfayan was admitted to the Schola Cantorum in Paris, France where he was taught by renowned music teacher and composer Charles Bordes and Vincent d'Indy. Upon completion of his studies, he lectured on Armenian music in both France and England. In 1905, he published a magazine called Kroonk and contributed to the Revue Artistique Armenienne in both French and Armenian. In 1907 he was admitted to the Société des auteurs, compositeurs et éditeurs de musique in Paris.

Krikor Kalfayan wrote over 150 musical compositions. His compositions are mostly based on religious and patriotic themes. On April 4, 1911, Kalfayan conducted his first concert which consisted of his musical works that he created in the Schola Cantorum de Paris.

Krikor Kalfayan moved from France and settled in the United States in 1913. Kalfayan became a U.S. citizen in 1922. After attaining his citizenship, he composed an American patriotic march entitled O America with lyrics by Alice Stone Blackwell. Kalfayan eventually became a music master in Armenian churches in Worcester, Boston, Lowell and Fresno. More than a dozen of his compositions have been published and recorded. Kalfayan gave concerts in New York City, Boston, Fresno, Los Angeles and San Francisco.

== Death ==
He died in Fresno, California in 1949.
