= Surp Pırgiç Armenian Hospital =

Yedikule Surp Pırgiç Armenian Hospital
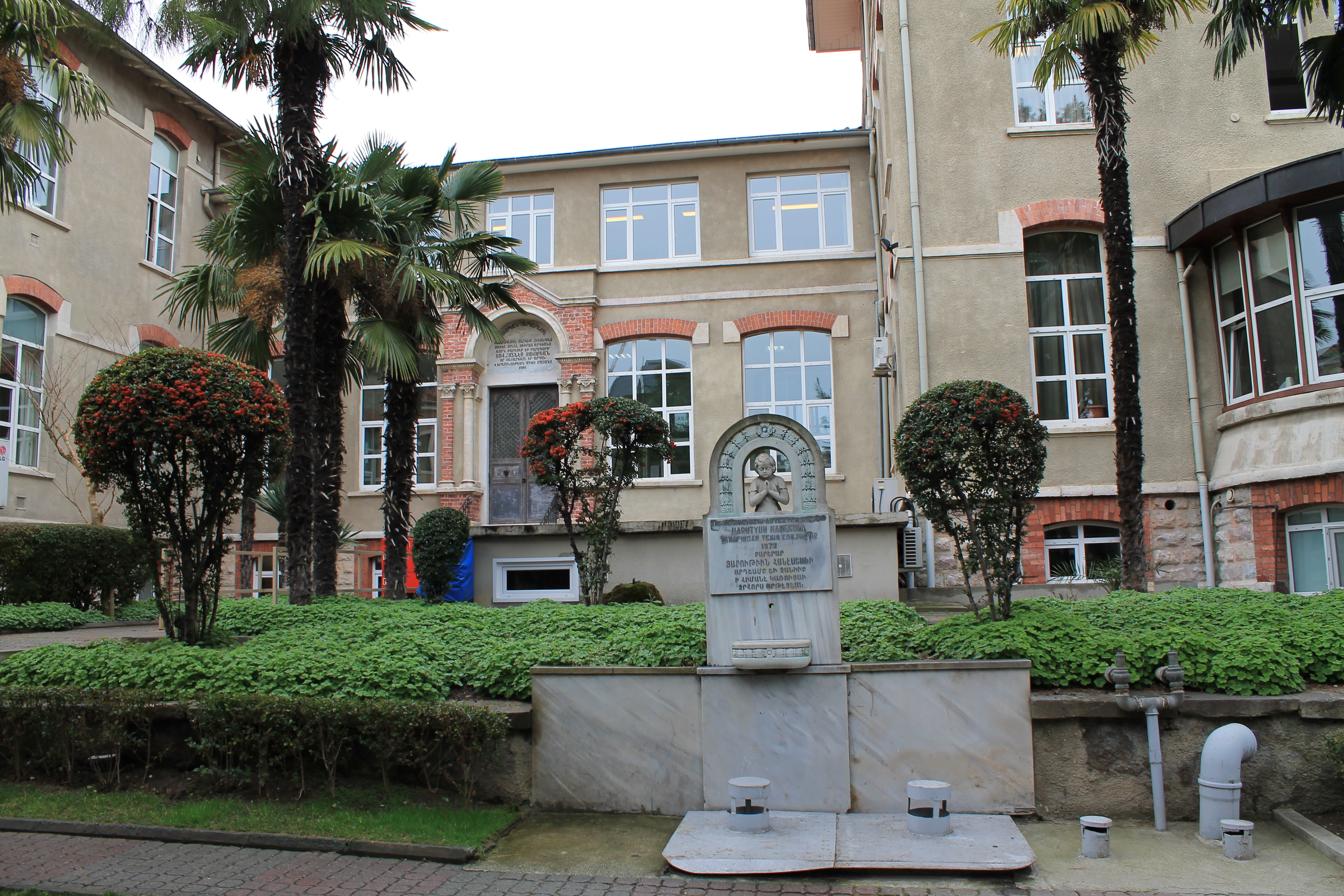
- Courtyard of hospital

Geography
- Location: Yedikule, Istanbul, Turkey
- Coordinates: 40.9937313°N 28.9147603°E

Organisation
- Type: District General
- Patron: Bedros Şirinoğlu

History
- Constructed: 1832
- Opened: May 31, 1834

Links
- Website: Surp Pırgiç Hospital official website (Turkish)
- Lists: Hospitals in Turkey

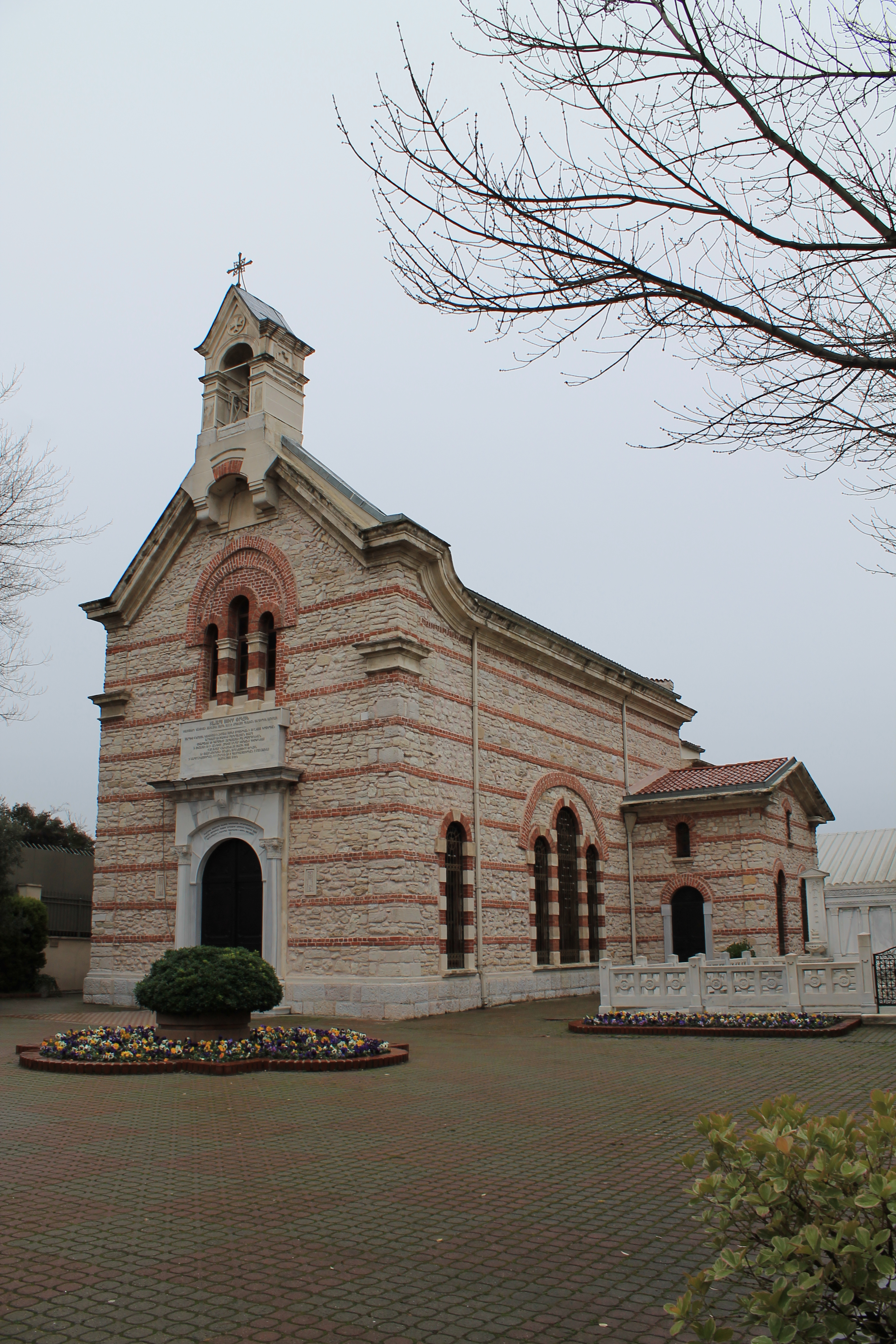
A church inside the hospital

The Yedikule Surp Pırgiç Armenian Hospital (Turkish: Yedikule Surp Pırgiç Ermeni Hastanesi) is a hospital in the Yedikule quarter of Fatih district of Istanbul which was established and continues to be managed by Turkish Armenians.

== History ==
Yedikule Surp Pırgiç Armenian Hospital's construction was started by Sultan II.Mahmut's edict in 1832 and hospital opened to service on 31 May 1834. Hospital is established by Ottoman Armenians led by Kazaz Artin Amira Bezciyan.

== Today ==
The hospital today stands as a fully equipped, first-rate institution, serving the public, irrespective of ethnicity or religion. The hospital has a museum, Bedros Şirinoğlu Müzesi, inaugurated by Recep Tayyip Erdoğan, the Prime Minister of Turkey in 2004, which displays various artifacts and paintings belonging to the Armenian cultural heritage of Istanbul.
