= Cathedral of Saint James, Jerusalem =

Armenian church in Jerusalem

Cathedral of Saint James
- Սրբոց Յակոբեանց Վանք Հայոց كاتدرائية القديس يعقوب للأرمن
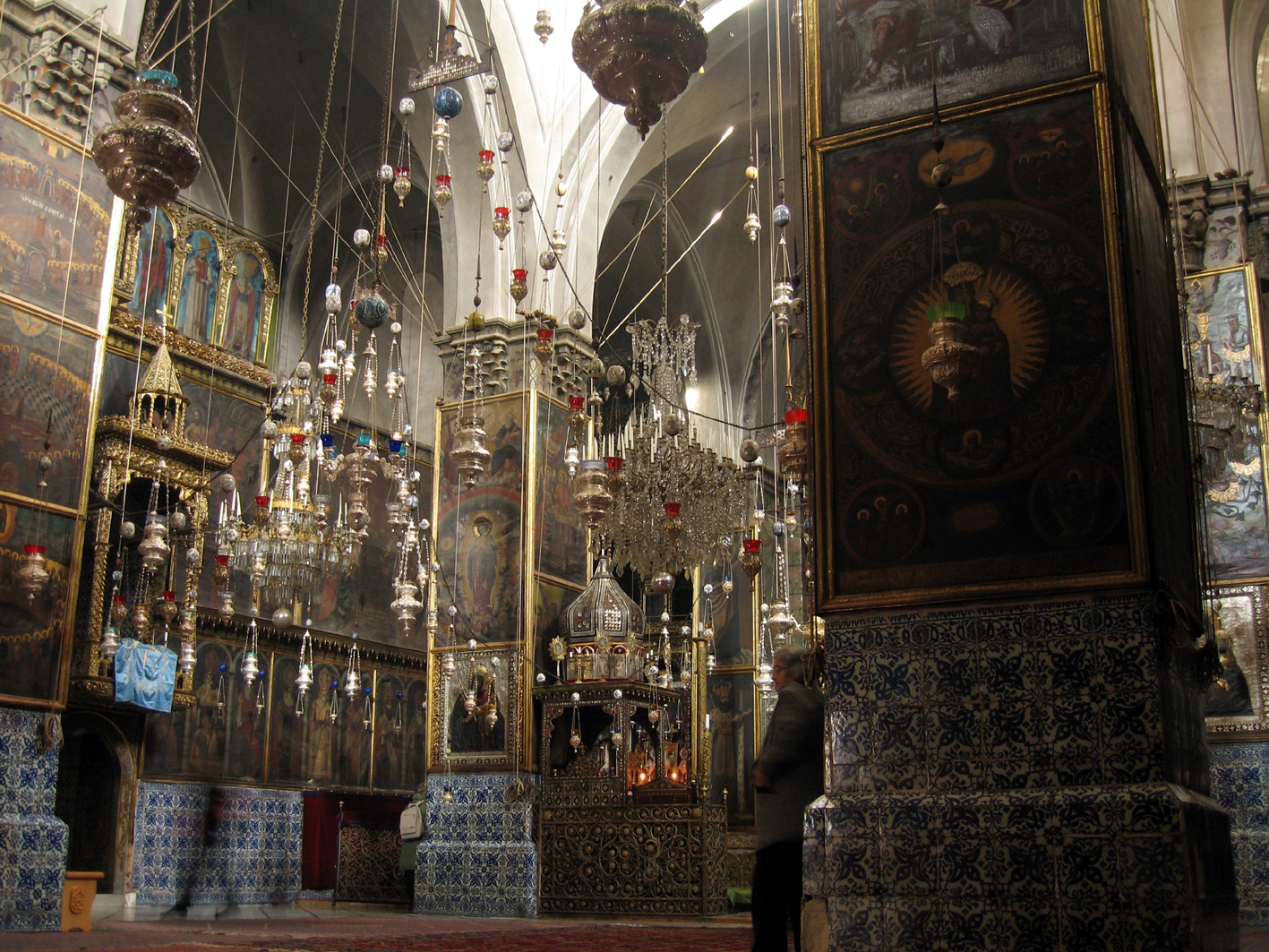
- Interior of the cathedral in 2007
- Cathedral of Saint James
- 31°46′28″N 35°13′44″E
- Location: Armenian Quarter, Jerusalem
- Denomination: Oriental Orthodox
- Churchmanship: Armenian Apostolic Church

History
- Status: Cathedral
- Dedication: James, son of Zebedee (James, the Greater); James, the brother of Jesus (James, the Just)

Architecture
- Functional status: Active
- Architectural type: Domed basilica
- Style: Armenian
- Completed: 12th century

The Cathedral of Saint James (Armenian: Սրբոց Յակոբեանց Վանք Հայոց, Arabic: كاتدرائية القديس يعقوب للأرمن) is a 12th-century Armenian church in the Armenian Quarter of Jerusalem, near the quarter's entry Zion Gate. The cathedral is dedicated to two of the Twelve Apostles of Jesus: James, son of Zebedee (James the Greater) and James the brother of Jesus (James the Just). It is located near the Church of the Holy Archangels.

It is the principal church of the Armenian Patriarchate of Jerusalem, also known as the Armenian Patriarchate of Saint James.

In 1162, it was described as complete by John of Würzburg which Nurith Kenaan-Kedar uses to argue that it was built during the reign of Queen Melisende.

By at least the fifth century AD, Armenian Christians had established a tradition of pilgrimage to Jerusalem, seeking spiritual renewal and forgiveness of sins. This long-standing practice left physical evidence, including hand-carved inscriptions concentrated around holy sites such as the Cathedral of Saint James and the foundation of a nunnery, dedicated to Saint Minas near the Tower of David in 438 AD. Scholars note that this deeply engrained pious tradition, centered on spiritual rather than martial goals, shaped a distinct Armenian perspective during the Crusades. Unlike the Latin crusaders, who were motivated by a mix of religious zeal, feudal ambition, and the promise of salvation through arms, the Armenians of Cilicia saw no inherent religious cause for a holy war. Their decision to ally with the crusaders is characterized as being driven primarily by political necessity and the strategic need to protect their homelands in Cilicia and northern Syria from common threats.

== Ornamentation ==
The ceiling is decorated with hanging ceramic eggs made in Kütahya. More ceramics from Kütahya appear in the form of tiles in the Chapel of Etchmiadzin. Originally destined for a 1719 attempt to repair the Church of the Holy Sepulchre, they ended up in the Cathedral of Saint James, after the plan fell through.

== Gallery ==
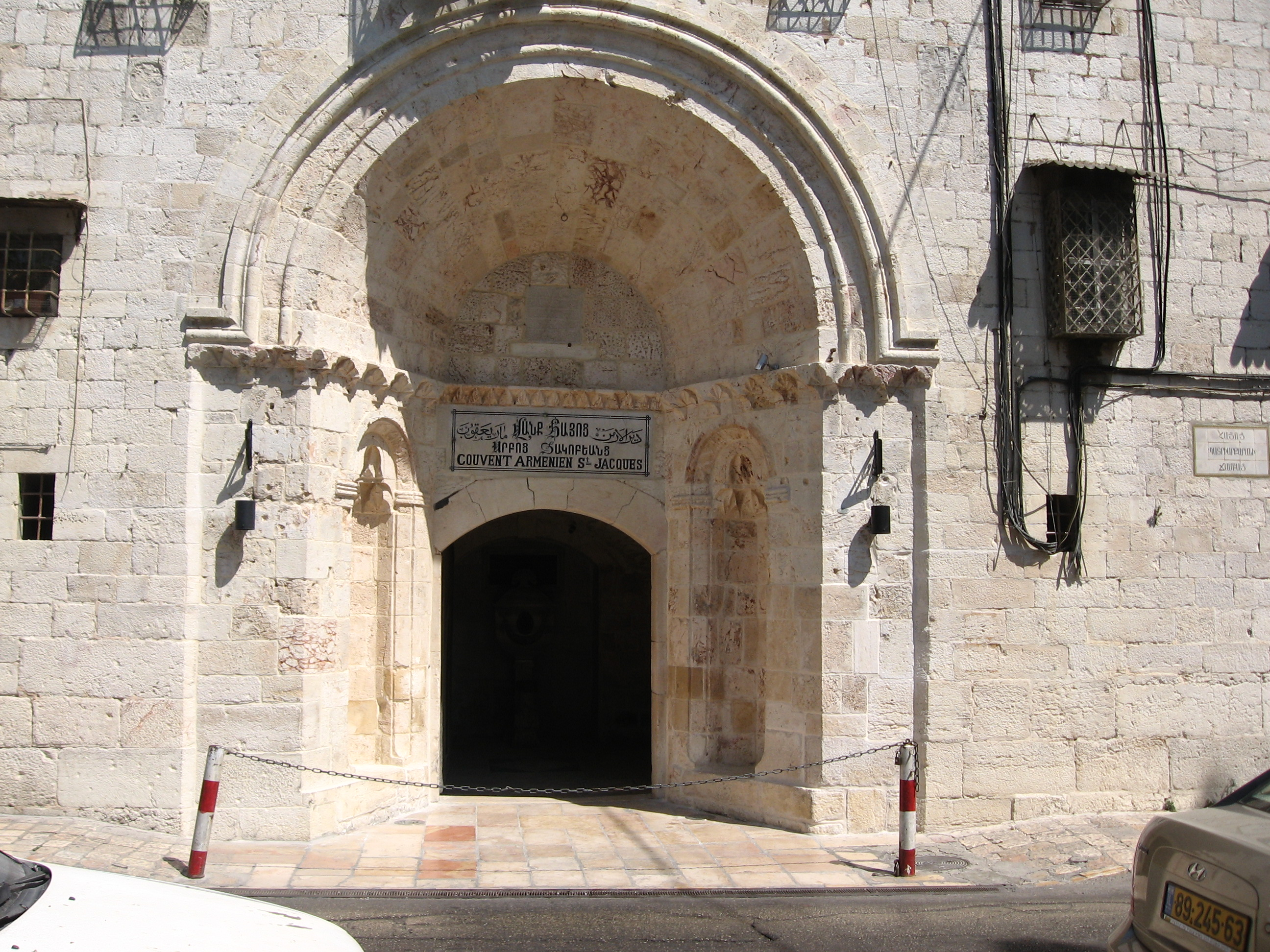
The entry gate to the Armenian Quarter

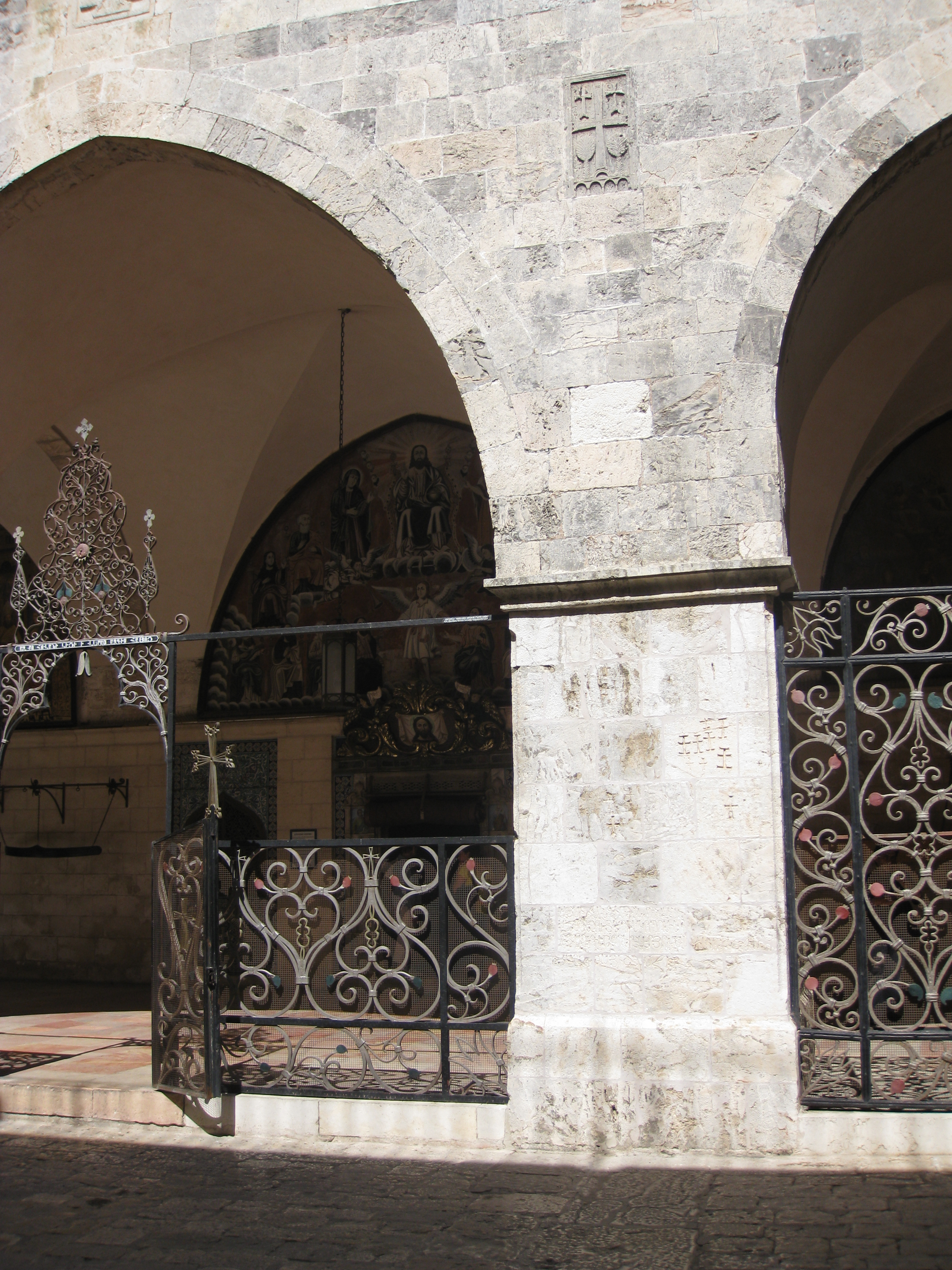
Entrance of the Cathedral

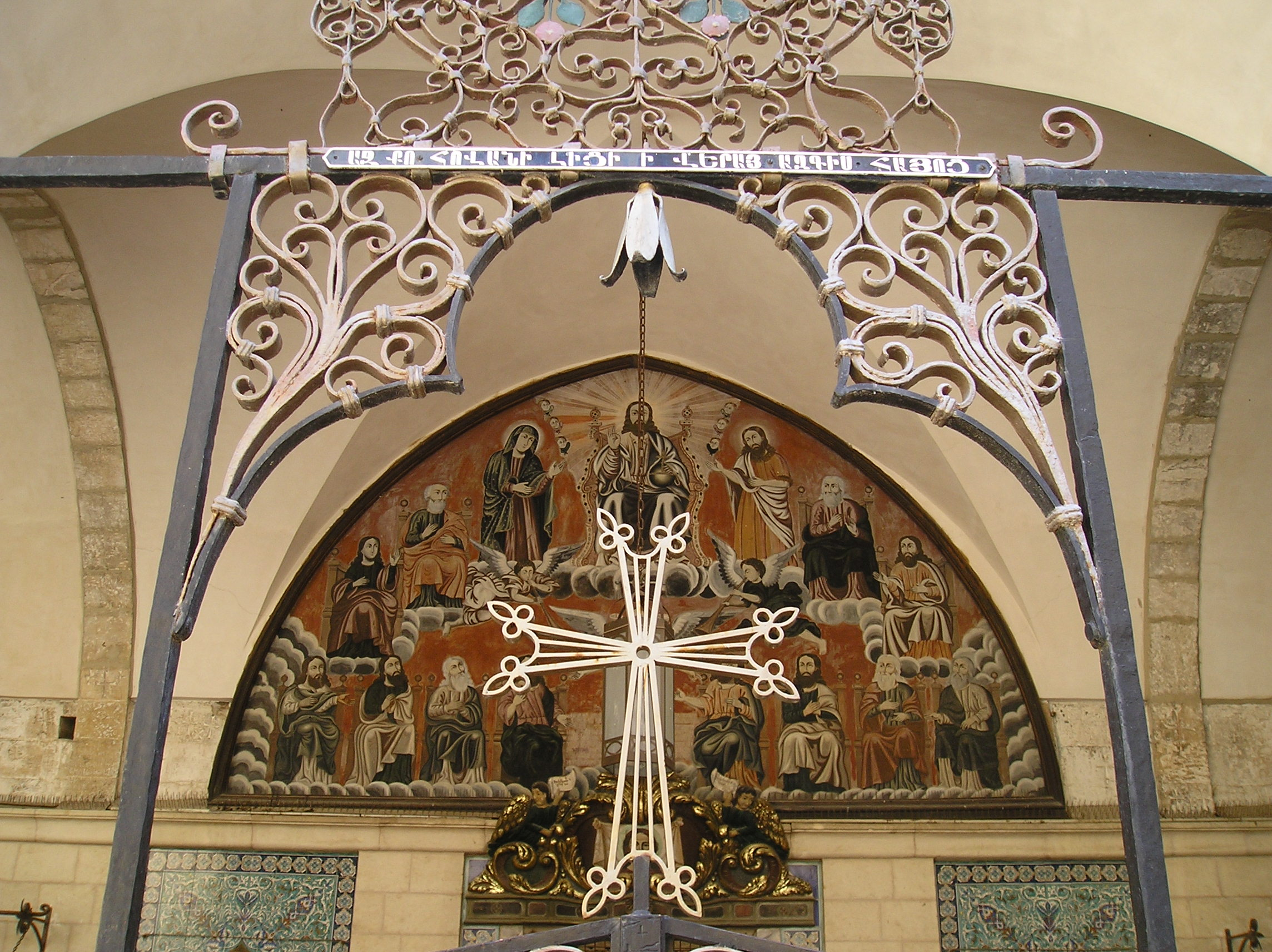
Closeup of metalwork at the entrance

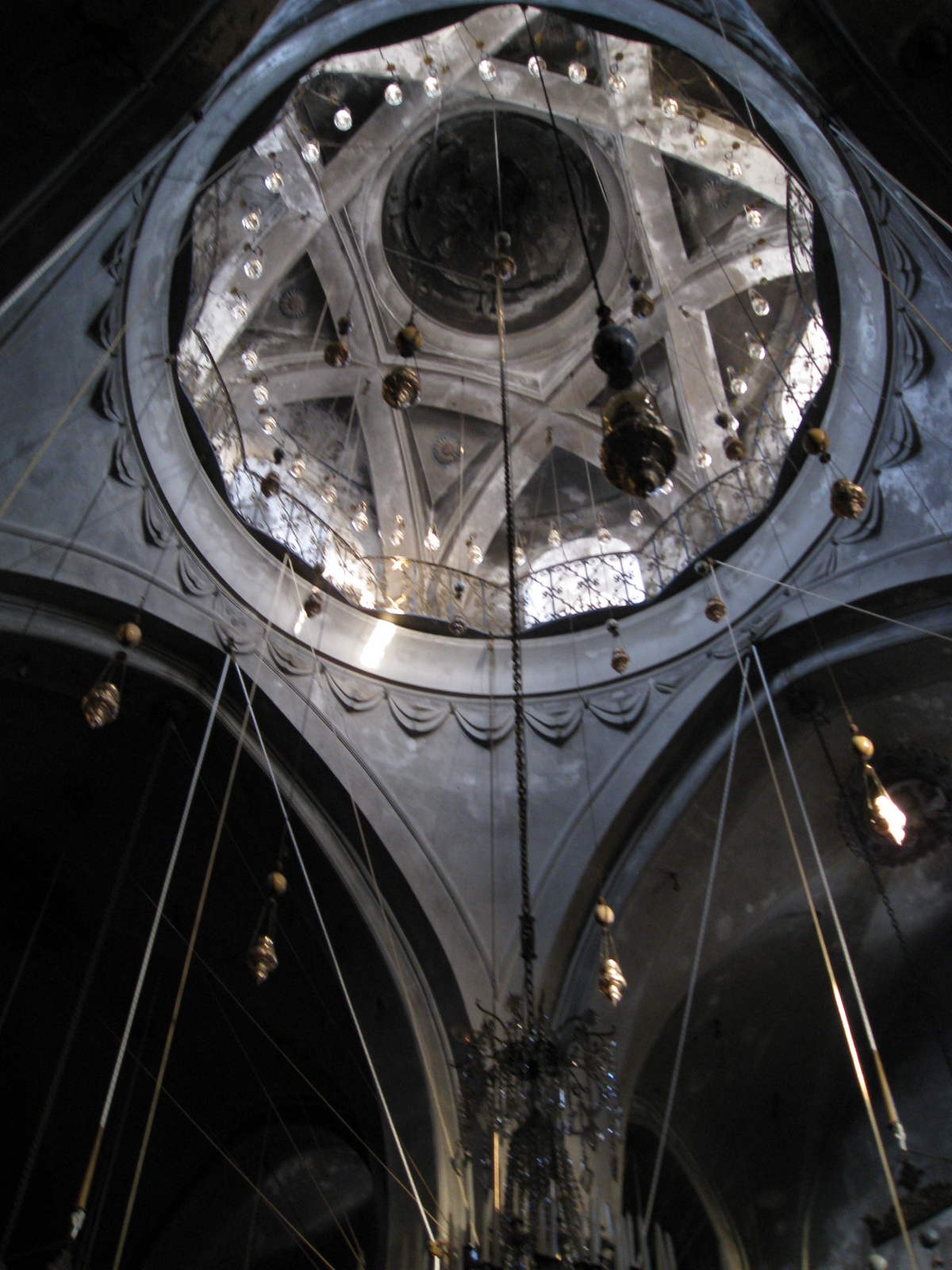
Arches and dome from the inside

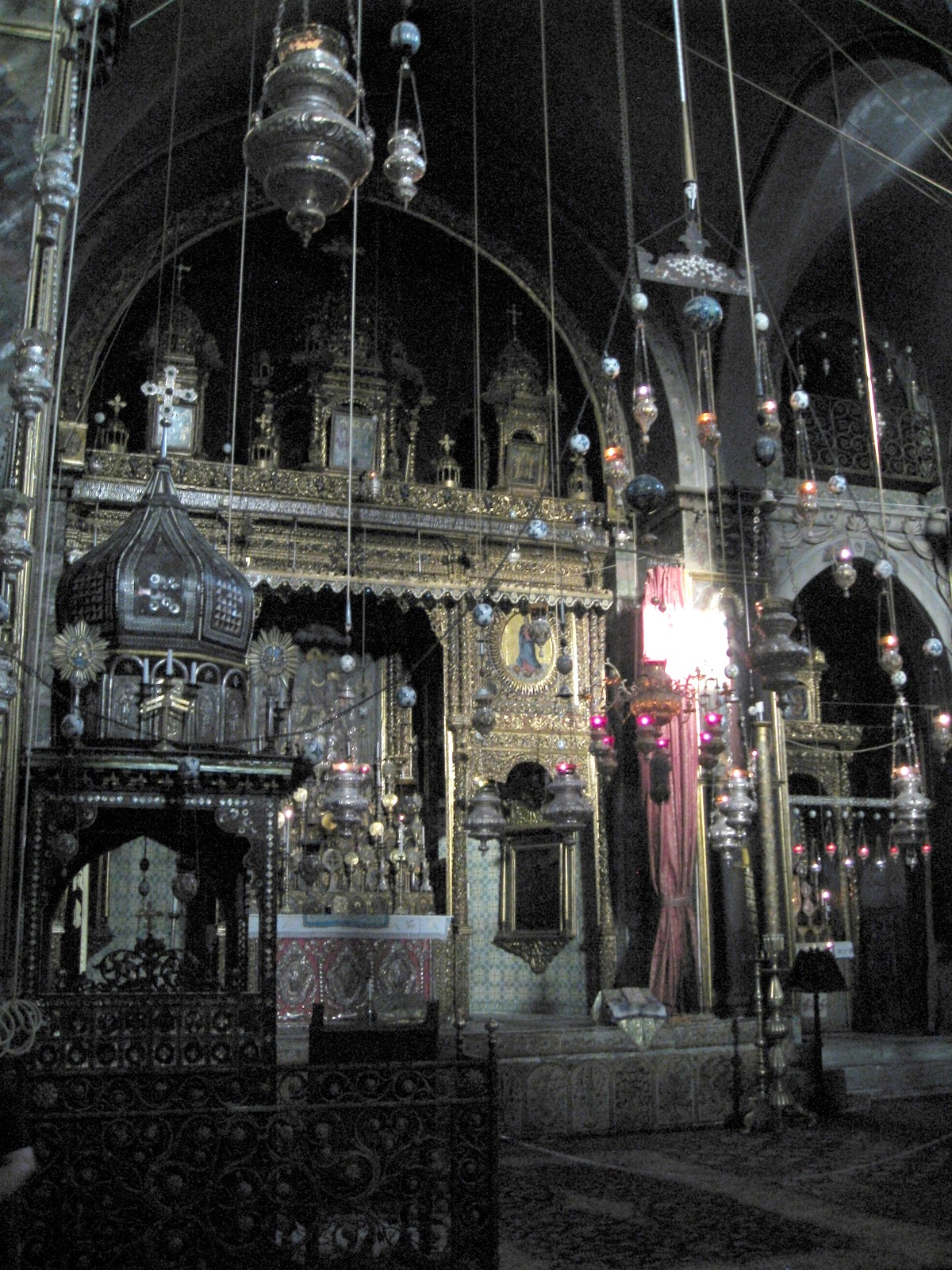
Another view of the interior

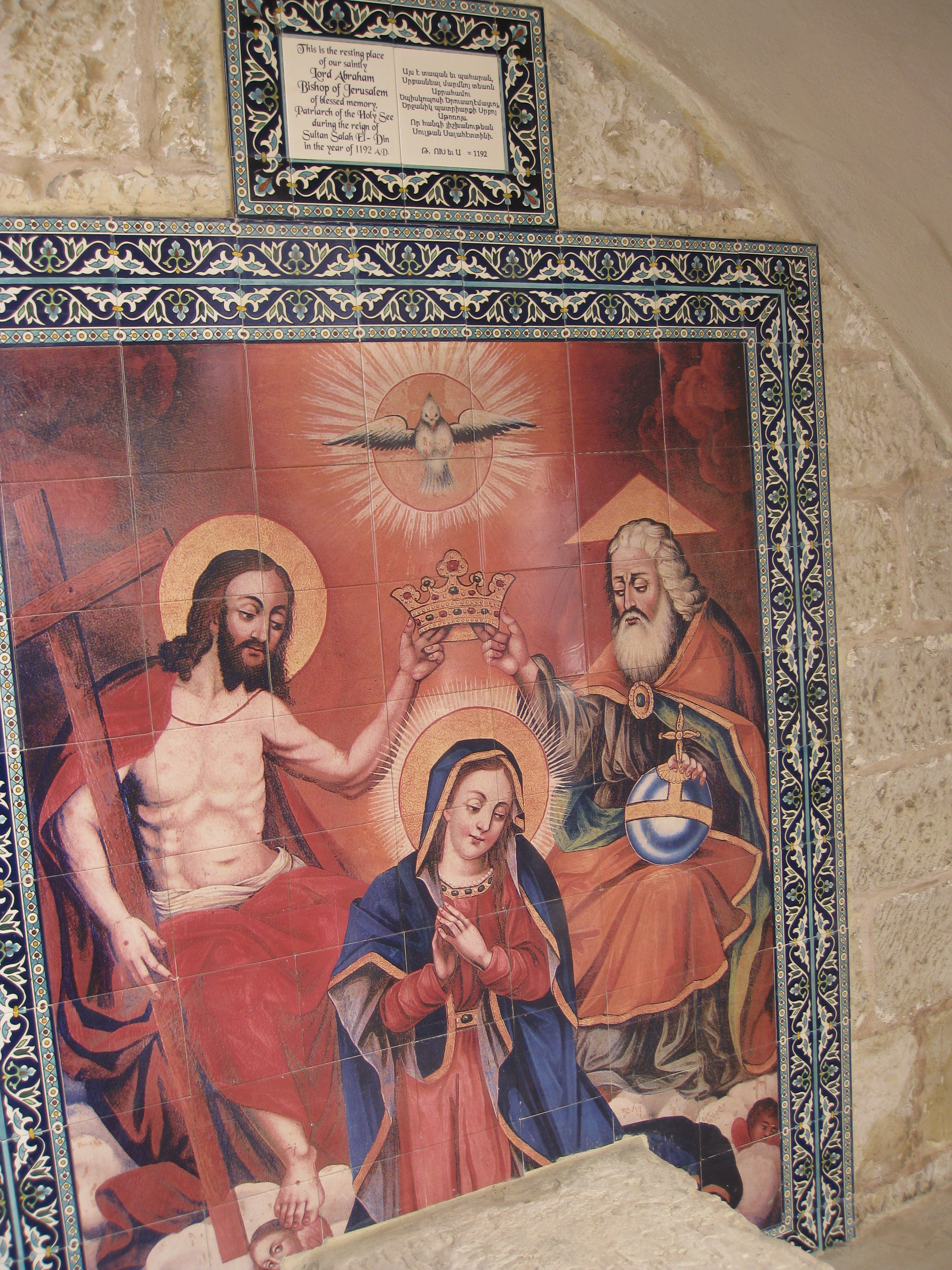
Epitaph and mural at the tomb of Patriarch Abraham, since 1192

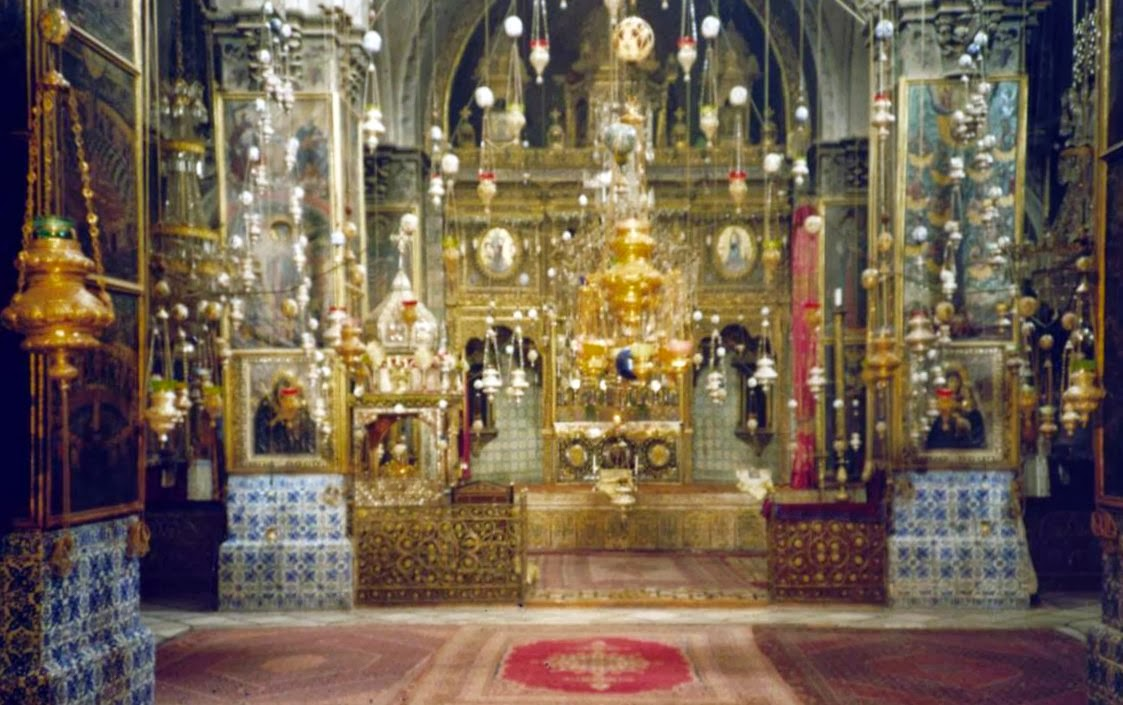
Altar in Cathedral of St. James (1996)

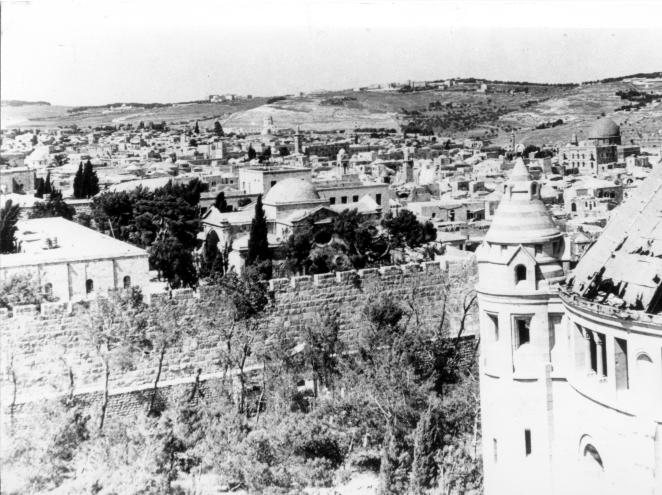
St James Cathedral 1948
Armenian stonework on the walls

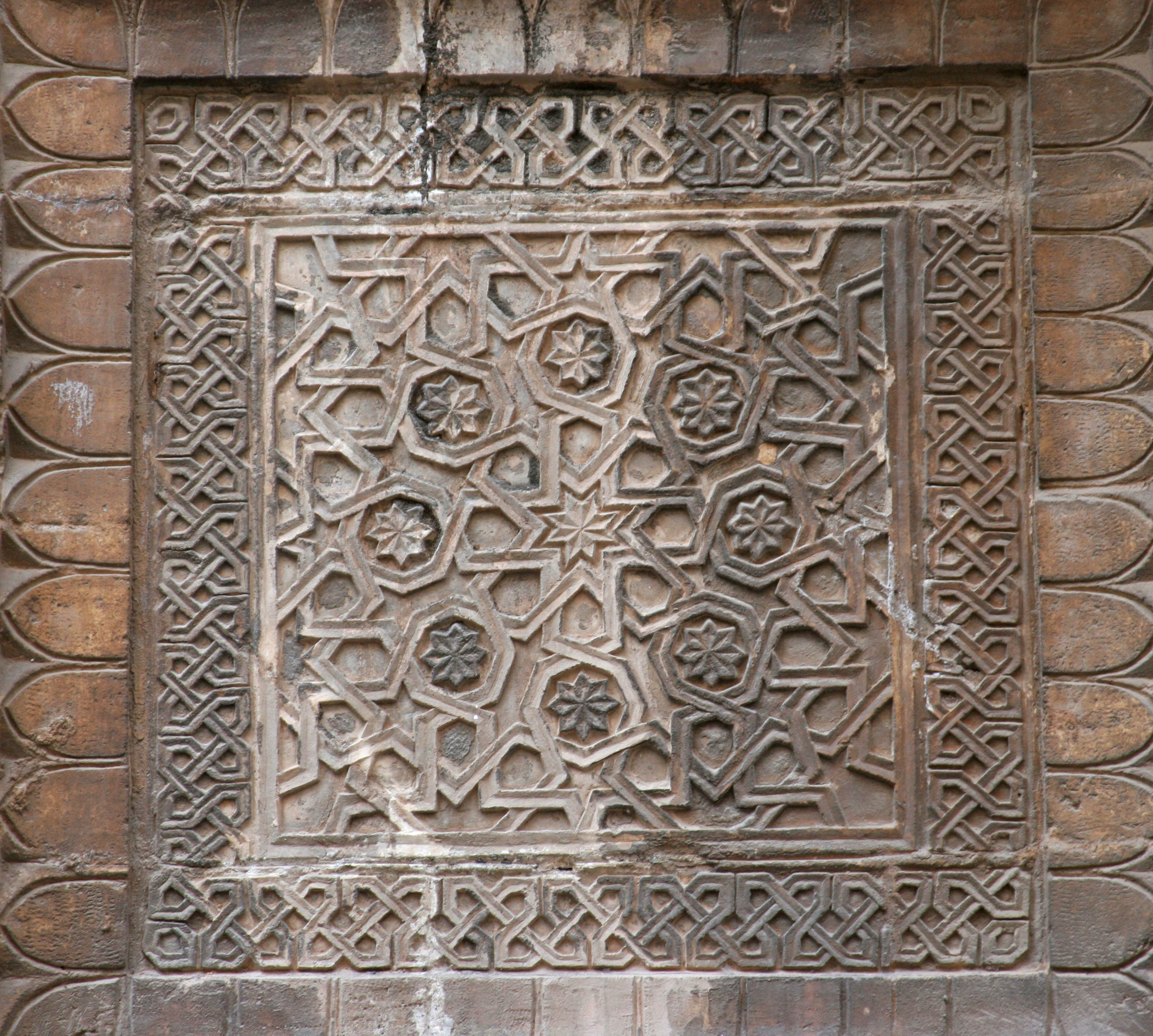

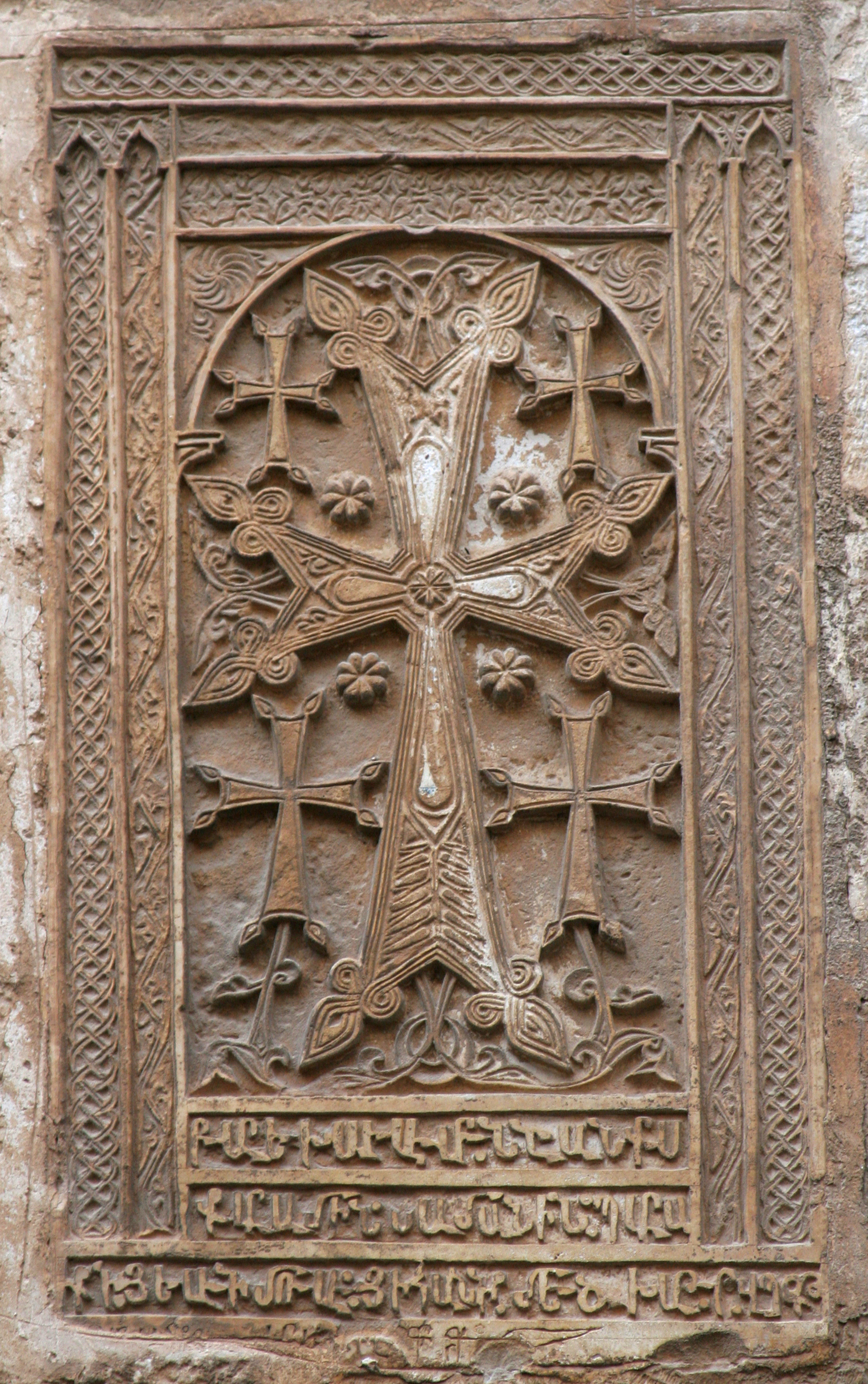
A khachkar

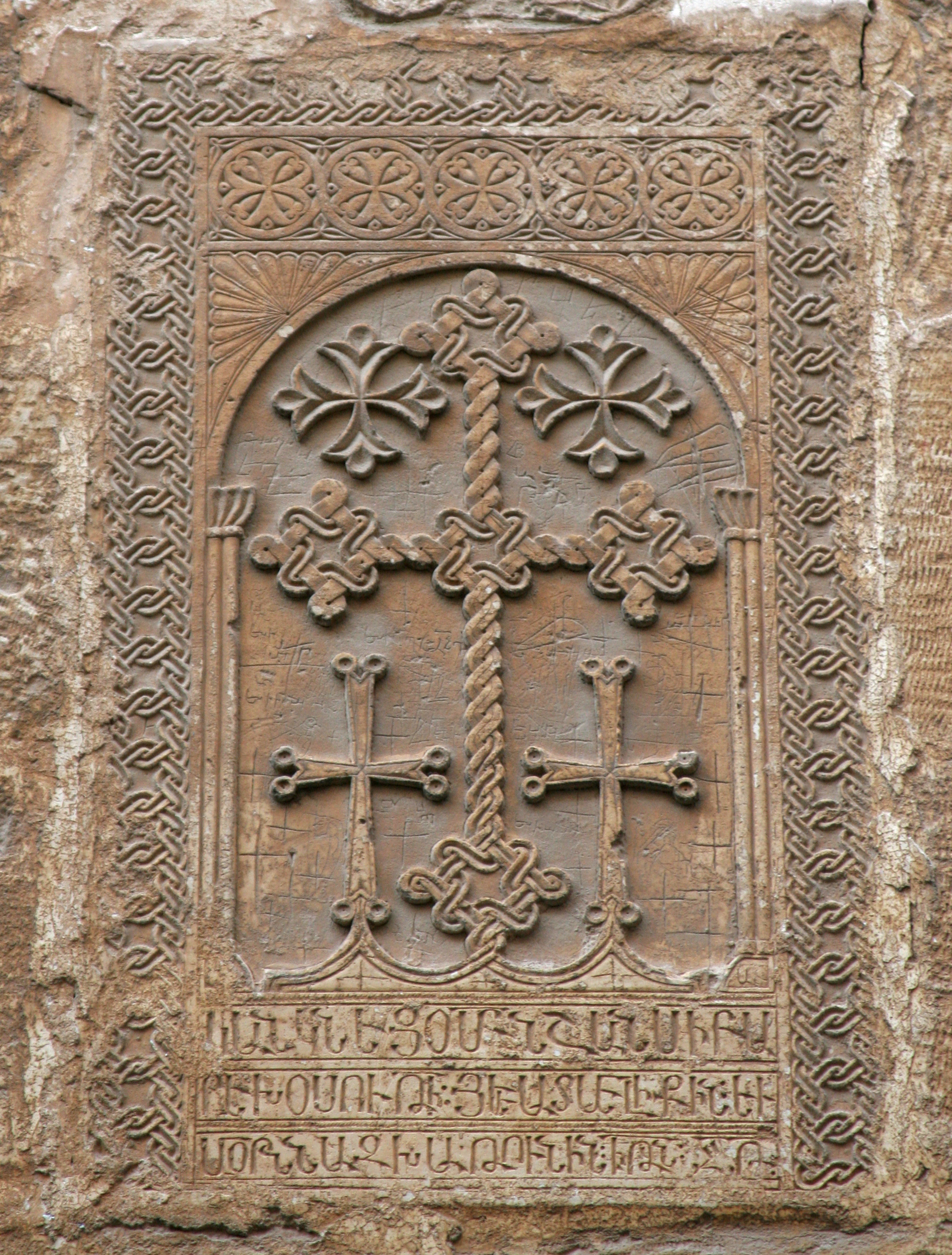
Another khachkar

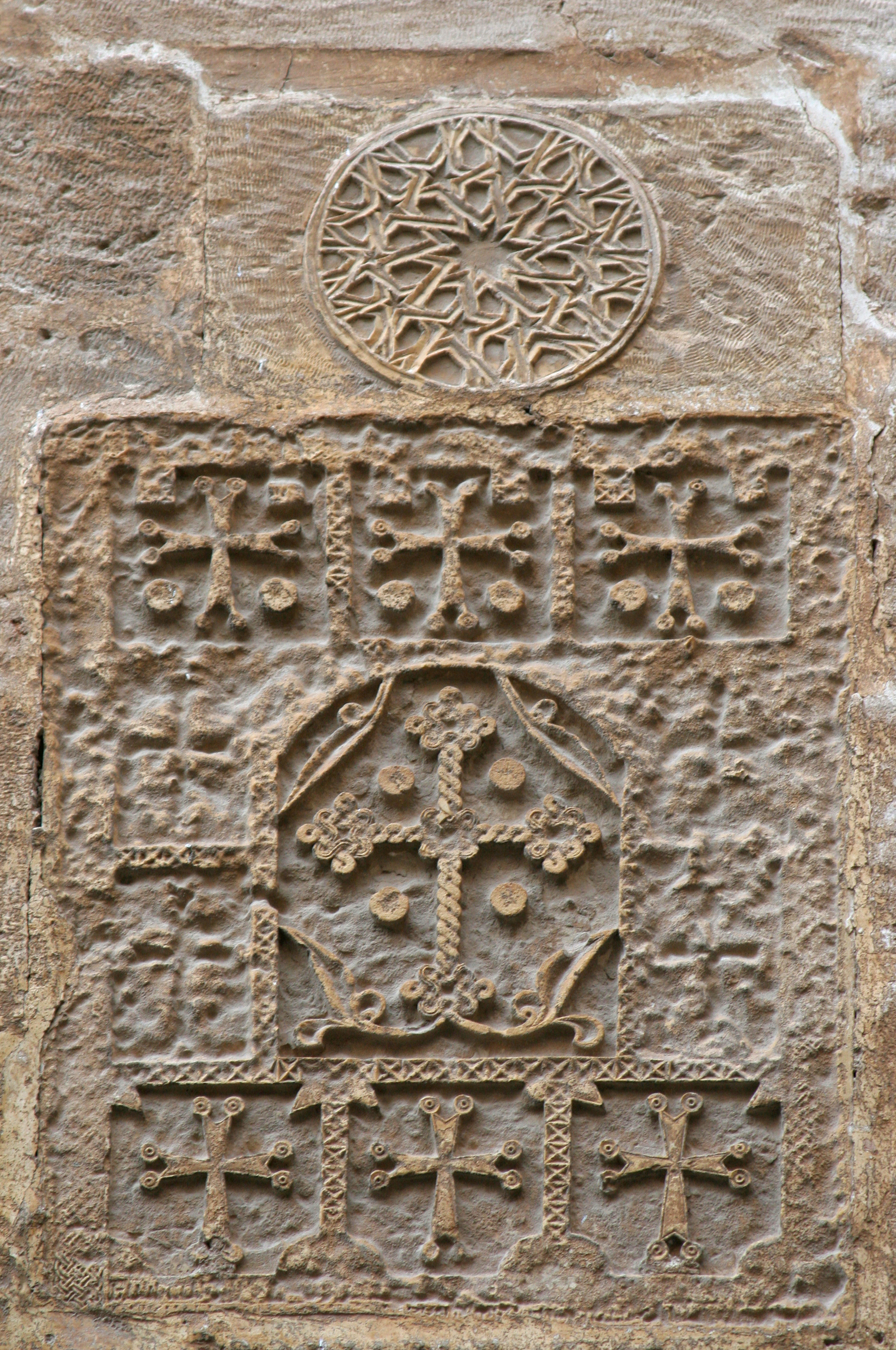

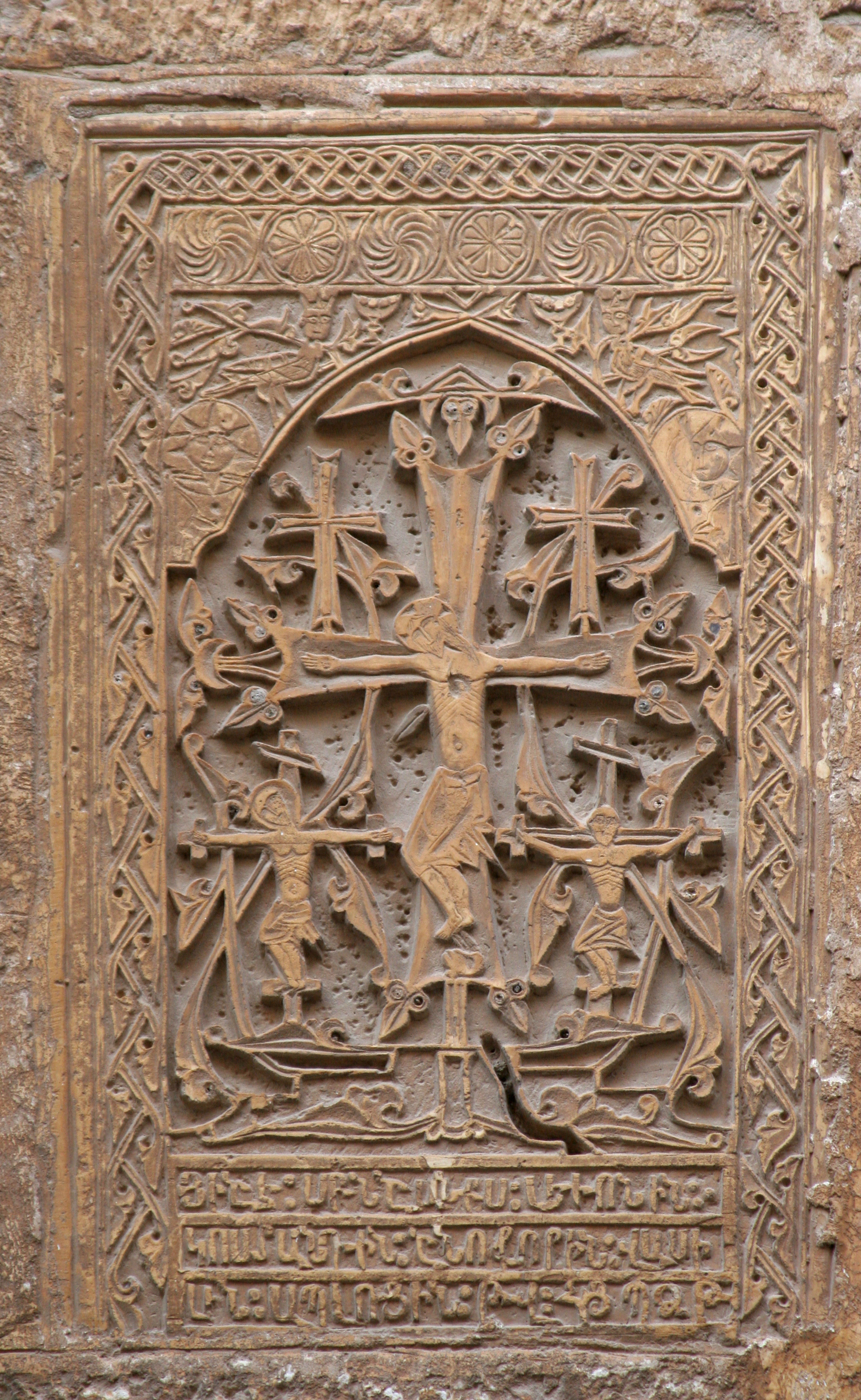
An Amenaprkitch-style khachkar

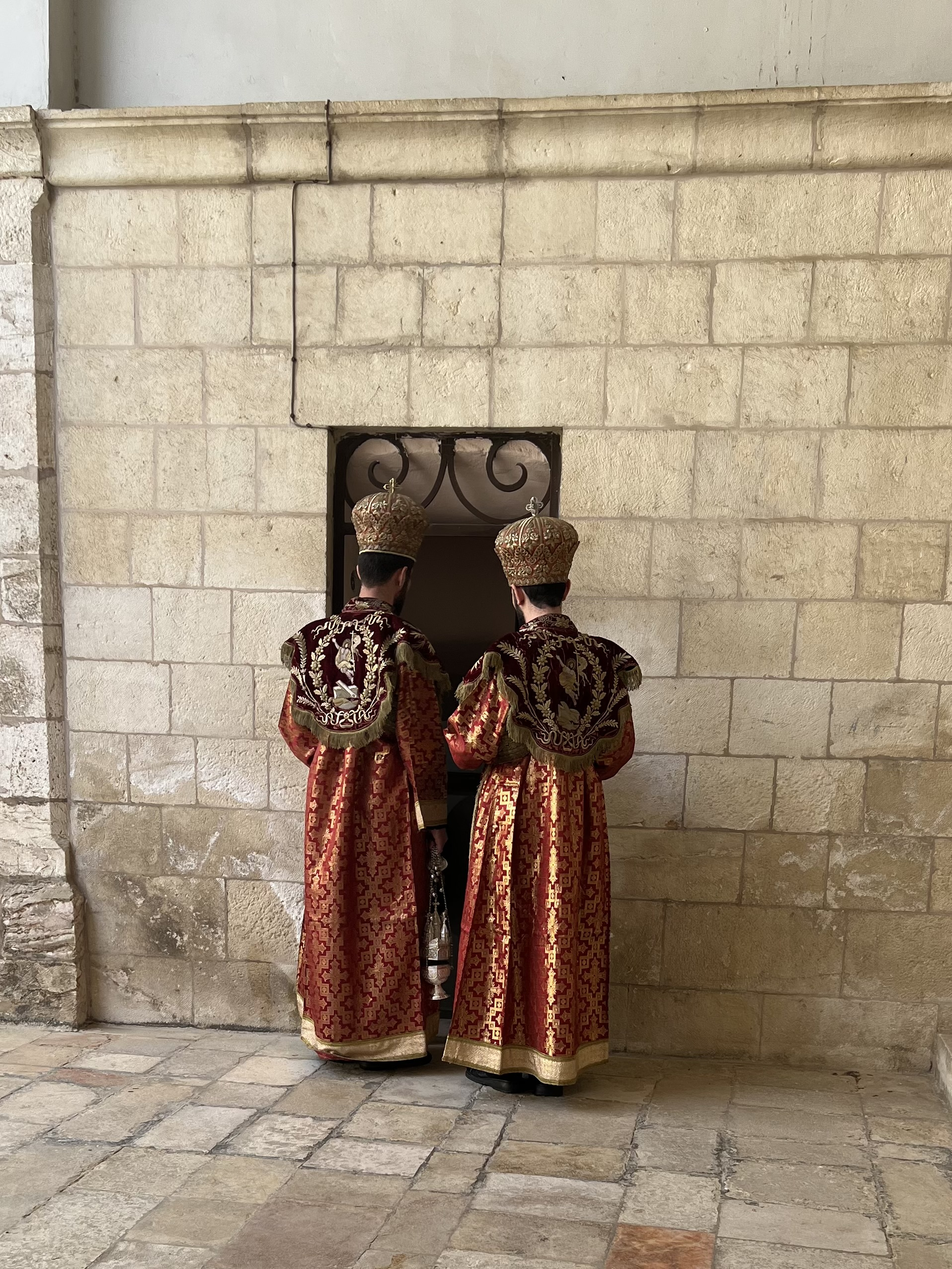

== See also ==
- List of Armenian Patriarchs of Jerusalem
- Hethum II, King of Armenia
