= Armenian Quarter =

One of the four traditional quarters of Jerusalem's Old City

Coordinates: 31°46′30″N 35°13′46″E

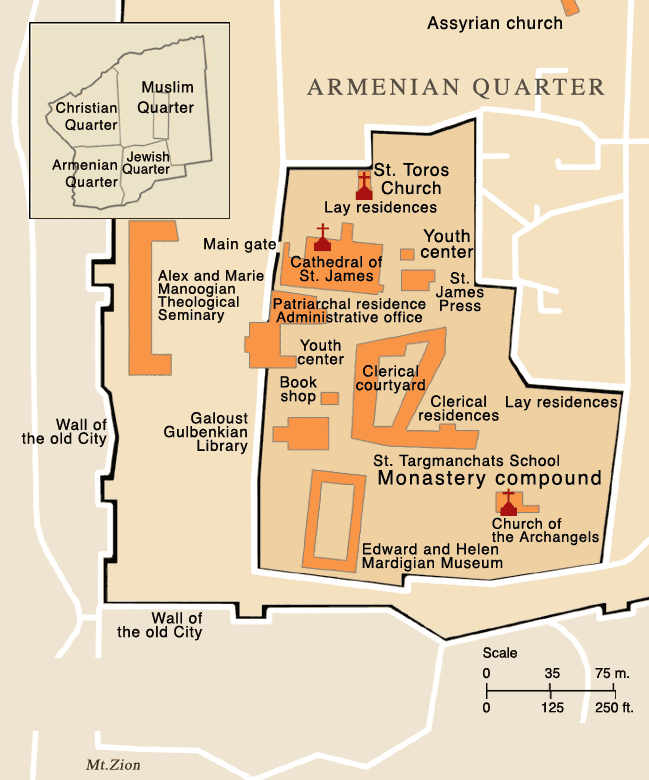
The Armenian Quarter in Jerusalem's Old City

The Armenian Quarter (Armenian: Հայոց թաղ, romanized: Hayots t'agh; (Note: Now usually known as Երուսաղէմի հայկական թաղամաս, Yerusaghemi haykakan t'aghamas. reformed orthography: Երուսաղեմի հայկական թաղամաս; Western Armenian pronunciation: Yerusaghemi haygagan t'aghamas) Arabic: حارة الأرمن, romanized: Ḥāraṫ al-Arman; Hebrew: הרובע הארמני, romanized: Ha-Rova ha-Armeni) is one of the four sectors of the walled Old City of Jerusalem. Located in the southwestern corner of the Old City, it can be accessed through the Zion Gate and Jaffa Gate. It occupies an area of 0.126 km^{2} (126 dunam), which is 14% of the Old City's total. In 2007, it had a population of 2,424 (6.55% of Old City's total). In both criteria, it is comparable to the Jewish Quarter. The Armenian Quarter is separated from the Christian Quarter by David Street (Suq el-Bazaar) and from the Jewish Quarter by Habad Street (Suq el-Husur).

The Armenian presence in Jerusalem dates back to the 4th century CE, when Armenia adopted Christianity as a national religion and Armenian monks settled in Jerusalem. Hence, it is considered the oldest living diaspora community outside the Armenian homeland. Gradually, the quarter developed around the St. James Monastery—which dominates the quarter—and took its modern shape by the 19th century. The monastery houses the Armenian Apostolic Church's Jerusalem Patriarchate, which was established as a diocese in the 7th century CE. The patriarchate is the de facto administrator of the quarter and acts as a "mini-welfare state" for the approximately 2,000 Armenian residents.

Though institutionally separate from the Greek Orthodox and Catholic Christians, the Armenians consider their quarter to be part of the Christian Quarter. The three Christian patriarchates of Jerusalem and the government of Armenia have publicly expressed their opposition to any political division of the two quarters. The quarter is perceived as separate from the rest of the Christian Quarter because of its distinct Armenian language and culture. (Note: "Apart from their monophysite views there is no reason why the Armenian community should not live happily with the other groups in the Christian Quarter. Yet, David Street is a dividing line of more than just theological significance, for the Armenians with their separate language and culture from the Arabs also have an almost exclusively commercial economic basis. Apart from the comparatively close relations between the Syrian Orthodox Community and the Armenians for theological reasons, the Armenians have preferred to separate themselves from Arabs of all faiths." "The difference, as I see it, is that by and large most of the Christian communities here are Palestinian ethnically, whereas the Armenians have their own ethnic identity as Armenians, and that is where in some sense they stand out or differ.") However, after several generations of living with Palestinians, there are many Armenians who identify as both Armenian and Palestinian, and especially those whose ancestors had already lived in Palestine centuries prior to Armenian genocide, are well integrated into the Arabic cultural and linguistic milieu.

== Location, borders and surface ==
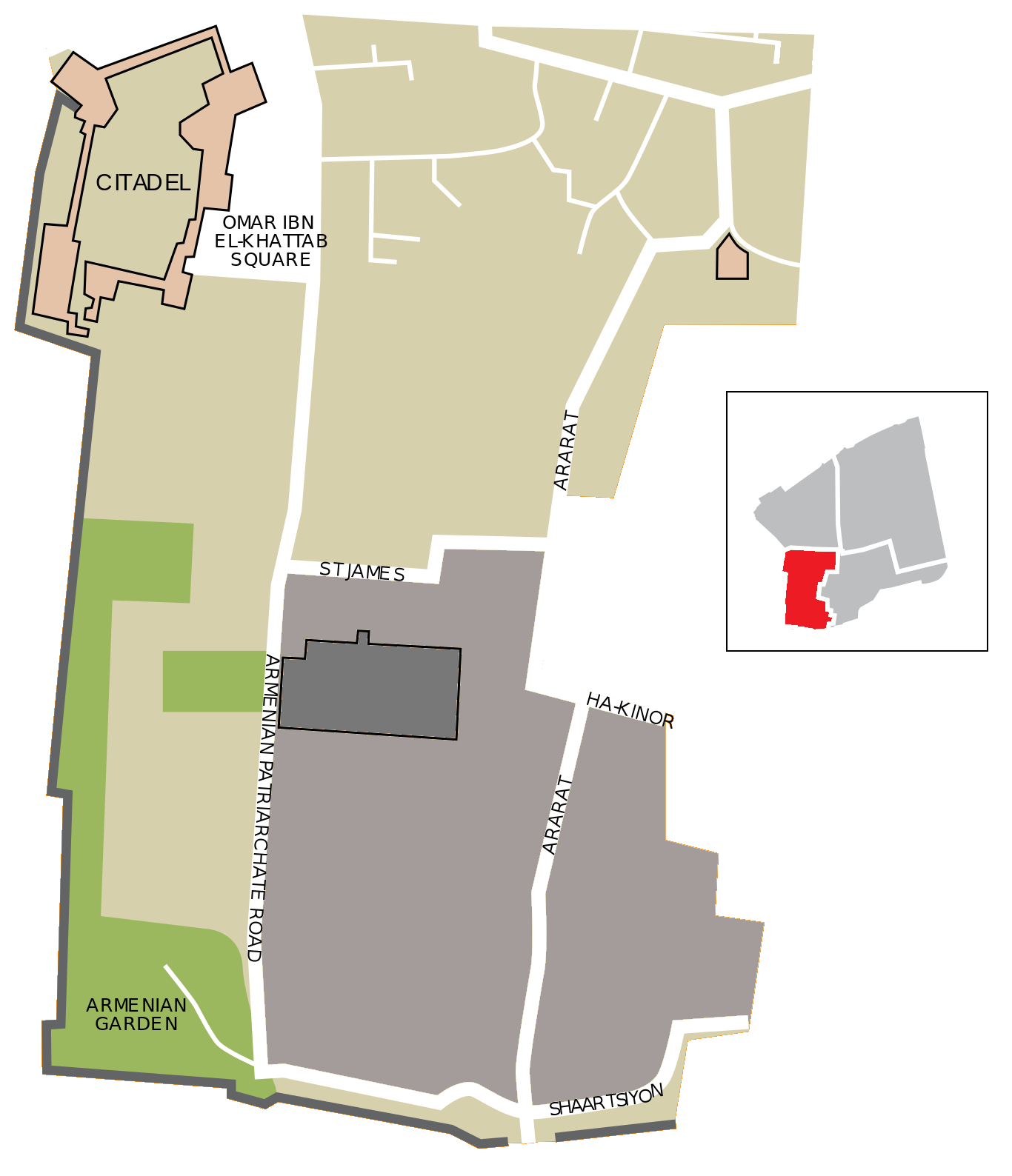
Map of Armenian Quarter

The Armenian Quarter is located in the southwestern corner of Jerusalem's Old City. The quarter can be accessed through the Zion Gate and Jaffa Gate. According to a 2007 study published by the International Peace and Cooperation Center, the quarter occupies an area of 0.126 km^{2} (126 dunam), which is 14% of the Old City's total. The Armenian Quarter is formally separated from the Christian Quarter by David Street (Suq el-Bazaar) and by Habad Street (Suq el-Husur) from the Jewish Quarter.

The Armenian district of Jerusalem originated around the Armenian monastery in the south part of the modern Armenian Quarter. The convention of the boundaries of the Armenian Quarter may have originated in its current form in the 1841 British Royal Engineers map of Jerusalem, or at least Reverend George Williams' subsequent labelling of it. The city had previously been divided into many more harat (Arabic: حارَة, romanized: Hārat: "quarters", "neighborhoods", "districts" or "areas", see wikt:حارة).

Jewish immigration from the mid-19th century onwards meant the Jewish quarter began to expand into the cartographically defined boundaries of the Armenian Quarter.

The table below shows the evolution of both the Armenian Quarter and the Jewish Quarter, from 1495 up until the modern system:

	Local divisions				Western divisions	
Date	1495	1500s	1800s	1900	1840s onwards	
Source	Mujir al-Din	Ottoman Census	Traditional system	Ottoman Census	Modern maps	
Quarters	Bani Harith	Bani Harith	Jawa'na	Sharaf	Armenian Quarter	West
Quarters	Dawiyya	Bani Harith	Jawa'na	Sharaf	Armenian Quarter	North
Quarters	Arman ("Armenian")	Sihyun	Arman	Sharaf	Armenian Quarter	South
Quarters	Yahud ("Jewish")	Sihyun	Yahud			East
Quarters	Yahud ("Jewish")	Risha	Yahud	Silsila	Jewish Quarter	South
Quarters	Yahud ("Jewish")	Maslakh	Yahud	Silsila	Jewish Quarter	South
Quarters	Saltin	Khawaldi	Yahud	Silsila	Jewish Quarter	South
Quarters	Sharaf	Sharaf (Alam)	Yahud	Silsila	Jewish Quarter	South
Quarters	'Alam	Sharaf (Alam)	Yahud	Silsila	Jewish Quarter	North
Quarters	Magharba ("Moroccan / Maghrebi")	Magharba	Magharba	Silsila	Jewish Quarter	East

== History ==
Armenian Orthodox Patriarchate Rd. signs in Hebrew (top), Arabic (middle), English (bottom) and Armenian (bottom photo)
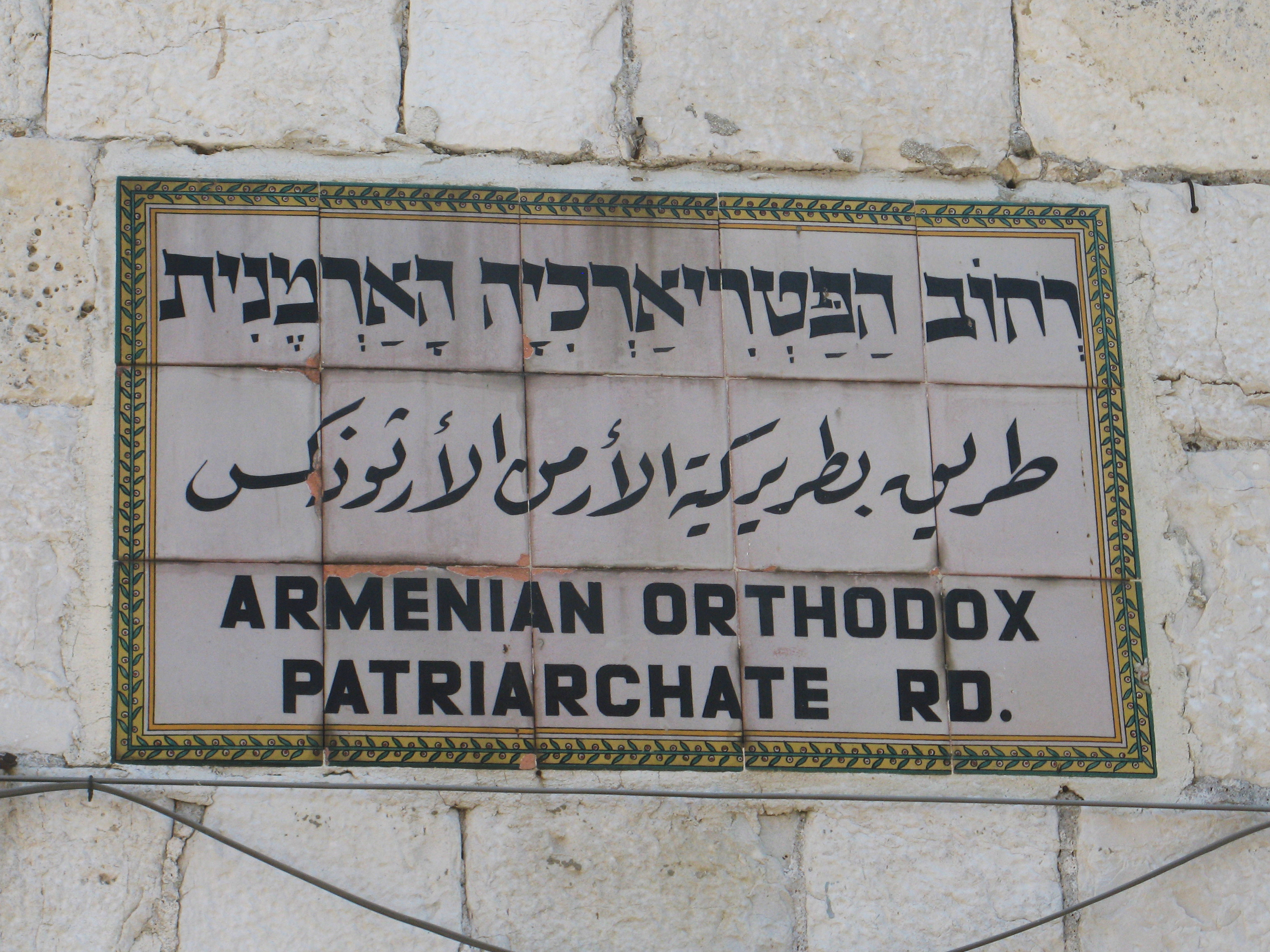
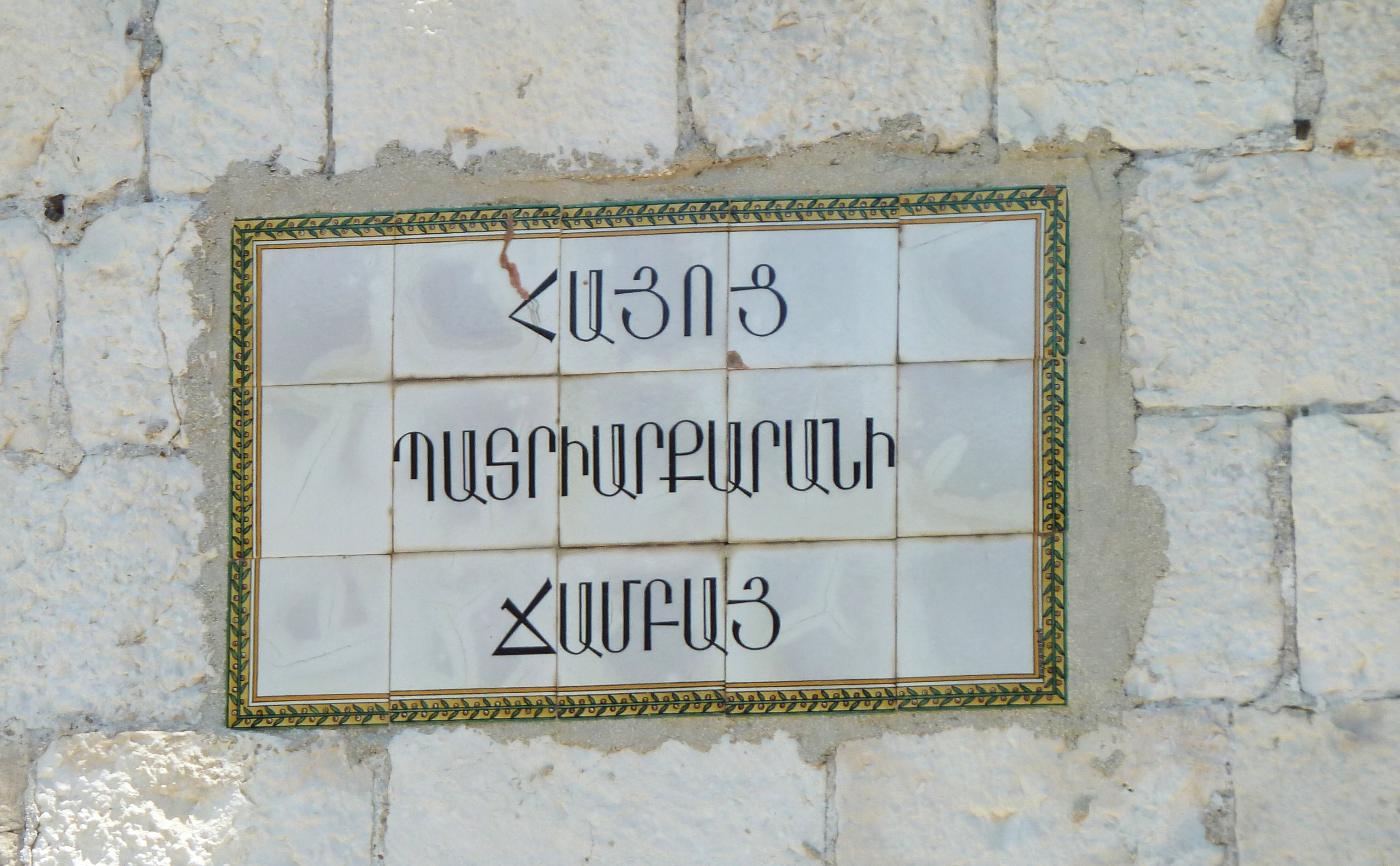

=== Origins ===
In the early 4th century (Note: The traditional date is 301 CE. A growing number of authors argue that the correct date is 314 by citing the Edict of Milan. Elizabeth Redgate writes that "the scholarly consensus is to prefer c. 314.") Armenia, under king Tiridates III, became the first country to adopt Christianity as a state religion. A large number of Armenian monks are recorded to have settled in Jerusalem as early as the 4th century, after the uncovering of Christian holy places in the city. However, the first written records are from the 5th century. Jerusalem is thus considered the oldest living diaspora community outside the Armenian homeland.

Philip Marsden wrote that the survival of Armenians in Jerusalem—"most intense of all cities"—proves their extraordinary resilience. Armenian churches were constructed during that period, including the St. James Monastery. The latter was last expanded in the mid-12th century. An Armenian scriptorium was in operation by the mid-5th century. A secular community composed of merchants and artisans was established in the 6th century in the Zion Quarter, where an Armenian street existed (Ruda Armeniorum).

=== Byzantine and Early Muslim periods ===
In the First Council of Dvin (506), the Armenian Church broke off from Chalcedonian Christianity by rejecting the dual nature of Christ, which was agreed upon in the Council of Chalcedon of 451. Thus, the Armenians found themselves in direct confrontation with the Byzantine Empire. Emperor Justinian I persecuted whom he considered to be Monophysite Armenians, forcing them to leave Jerusalem.

A 7th-century Armenian chronicler mentioned the existence of seventy Armenian monasteries in the Holy land, some of which have been revealed in excavations. The Byzantines ceded Jerusalem to the Rashidun Caliphate after a siege in 637. Until this point, Jerusalem had a single Christian bishop. In 638 CE, Armenians established their own archbishop, Abraham I. He was officially recognized by Rashidun Caliph Umar. The foundation of the Armenian migration to Jerusalem thus solidified.

=== Crusader/Ayyubid and Mamluk periods ===
In the 12th century, around one thousand Armenians moved to Jerusalem with the Crusaders, presumably mainly from the Armenian Kingdom of Cilicia.

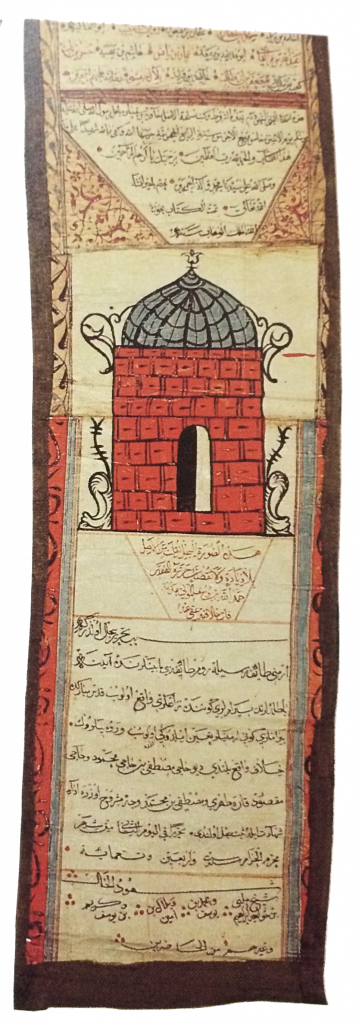
Firman issued by Salah ad-Din to the Armenians of Jerusalem after the siege of the city in 1187

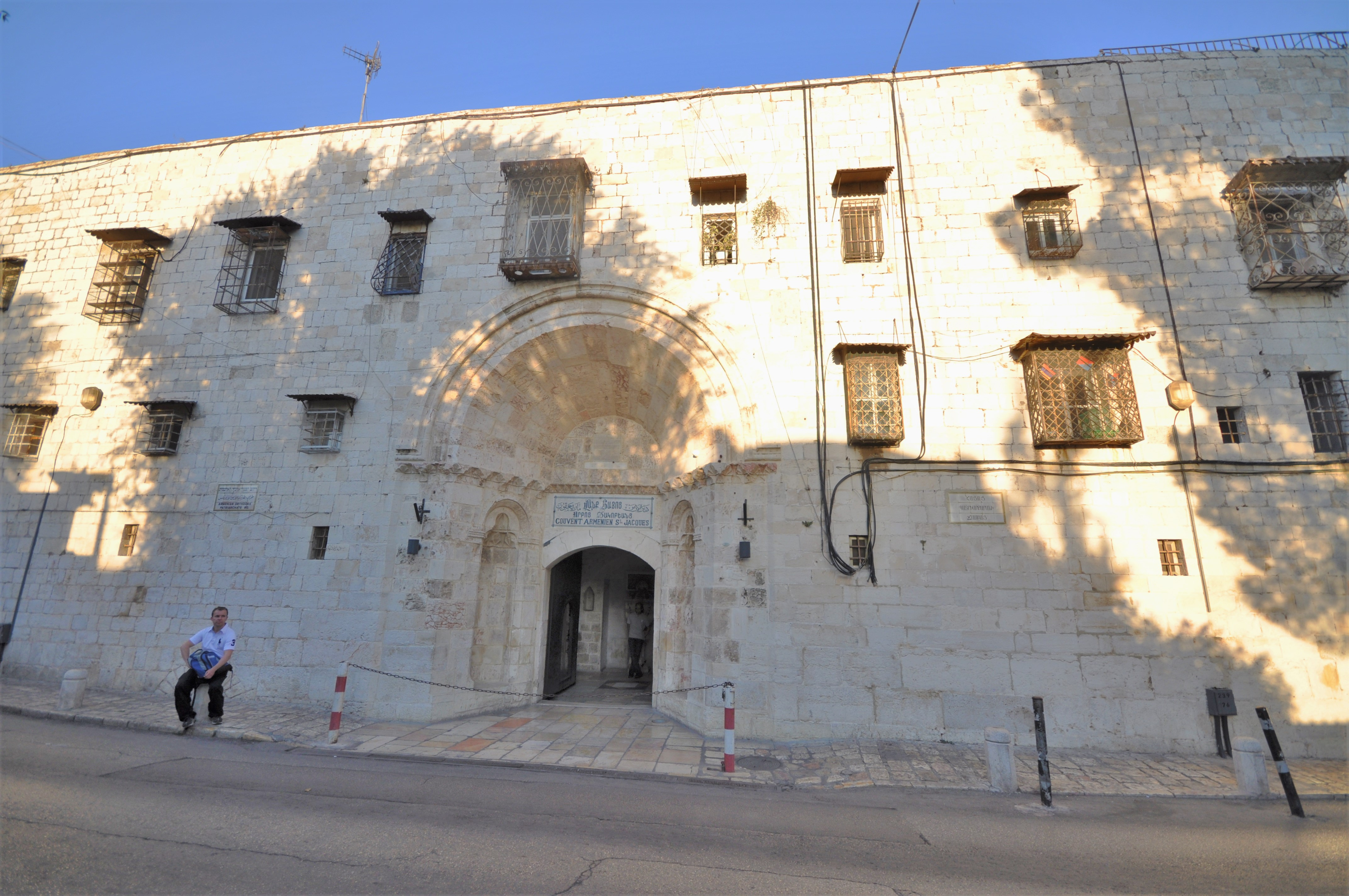
The entrance to St. James monastery

In 1311, during Mamluk rule, Archbishop Sarkis (1281–1313) assumed the title of patriarch according to a decree by Sultan al-Nasir Muhammad. In the 1340s, the Armenians were permitted to build a wall around their quarter. This signified that the Mamluk rulers felt that the quarter did not pose a threat. Destroying city walls and fortifications had been a staple of Mamluk governance in order to prevent the Crusaders from returning and reestablishing their rule. The Mamluk government also engraved the following declaration in Arabic on the western entrance to the quarter:

The order of our master Sultan Jaqmaq [has been issued] which stipulates that the taxes levied [ahdaiha] recently by the town governor (?) regarding the payment by the Armenian enclosure [dayr alarmani] be cancelled, ... and it has been requested that this cancellation be recorded in the Honored Books in the year 854 of the Hijra (1451 C.E.). Anyone who renews the payment or again takes any tax of extortion is damned, son of the damned, and the curse of Allah will be upon him.

Jerusalemite historian Mujir al-Din provided a detailed description of pre-Ottoman Jerusalem in 1495 in which he mentioned Dir el-Arman (Monastery of the Armenians) or Kanisat Mar Ya'qub (St. James Cathedral).

=== Ottoman period ===
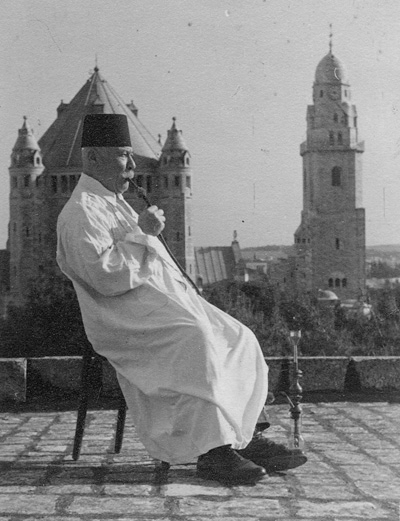
An Armenian priest in Jerusalem c. 1900 pictured smoking a hookah with the Dormition Abbey in the background

The Ottomans tolerated the presence of non-Muslim, Dhimmi, communities including the Christian Armenians. There was religious tolerance and an Ottoman administration existed to sort out religious differences between the rival Christian churches and Muslims. Israeli historians Kark and Oren-Nordheim wrote in 2001: "The Armenian Quarter, although Christian, represented a distinct ethnic group with its particular language and culture, intent on retaining separate identity and unity, minimizing the contacts with Arabs and the Ottoman authorities for fear of persecution." Many members of the Armenian community in Jerusalem spoke Arabic, in addition to Armenian.

In 1538, the current walls of Jerusalem were completed on the orders of Sultan Suleiman the Magnificent. These walls, along with the internal walls built by the Armenians, determined the outline of the quarter. In the 1562–63 record, only 189 Armenians were counted, whereas 640 were counted by the Ottomans in 1690, an increase of 239%. According to the chronicler Simeon Lehatsi only some twelve Armenian families lived in Jerusalem in 1615–16. The significant increase in the population in 1690 is attributed to urbanization experienced by the Armenians and other Christians. Thus Armenians came to make up 22.9% of Jerusalem's Christians by 1690, becoming the second largest Christian community.

In the 19th century, most of the Armenian and Christian quarters had "European-style gable roofs" as opposed to the domes preferred in the Muslim and Jewish quarters. In 1833 the Armenians established the city's first printing press. A seminary was opened in 1857. In 1855 the first photographic workshop in Jerusalem was founded in the Armenian Quarter. Schools for boys (1840) and girls (1862) were united in 1869 under the name Holy Translators' School and became the first coeducational school in Jerusalem.

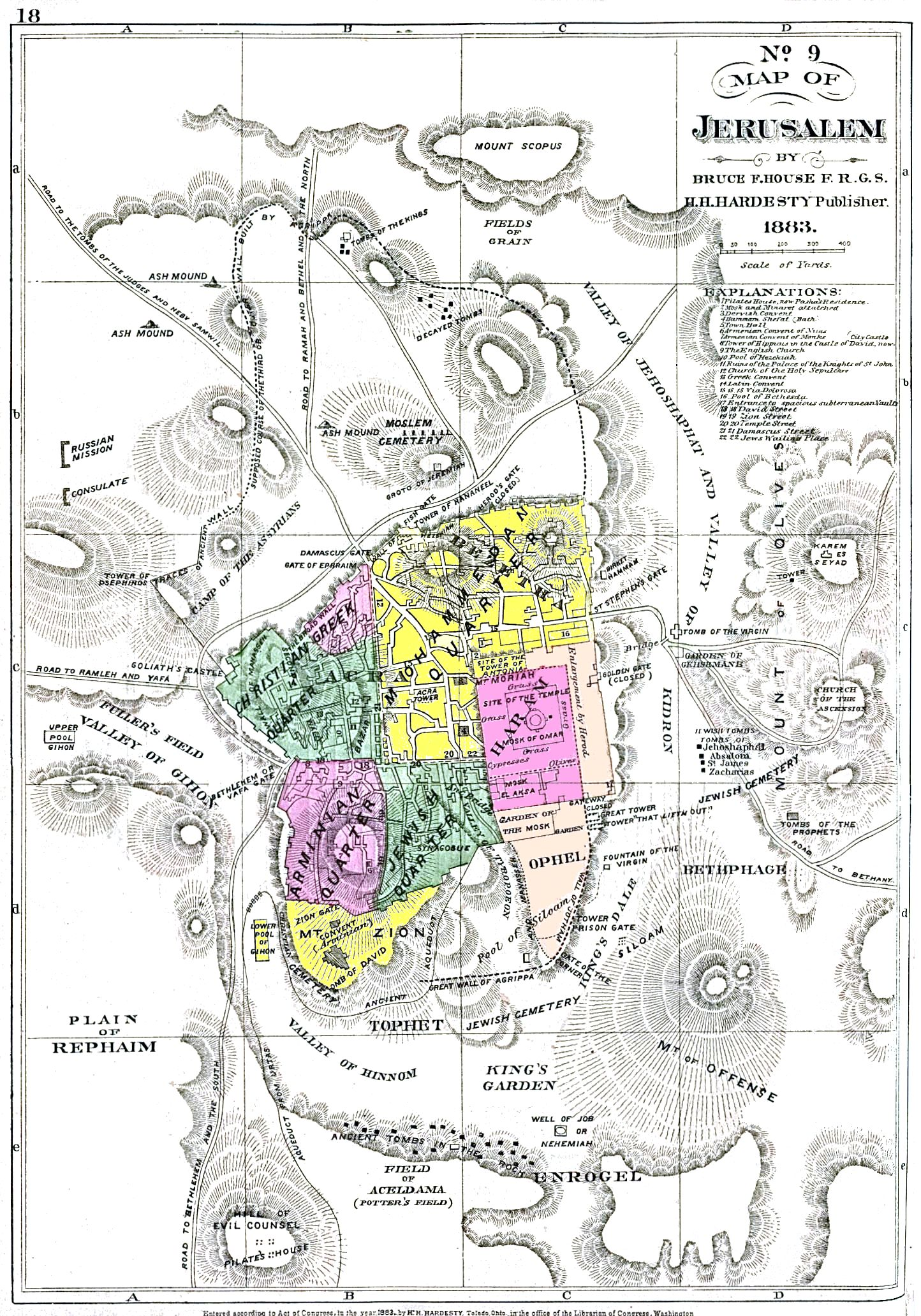
An 1883 map of the Old City, showing the four quarters

In 1854 Karl Marx reported 350 Armenians in Jerusalem. In 1883, 102 Armenian families (8%) constituted the third largest Christian community in the Old City after the Greek Orthodox and Catholic (Latin) communities. Besides these residents, in the same year, 46 Armenian priests and monks and 55 servicemen lived within the St. James Monastery. According to the 1905 Ottoman census in the Old City, the Armenian Quarter had a population of 382, of which Armenians (121) comprised less than one-third (31.7%). Jews (127) made up 33.2%, other Christians (94) 24.6% and Muslims (40) 10.5%. The Jews, who numbered a little more than the Armenians, inhabited the eastern part of the Armenian Quarter, which in the second half of the nineteenth century, became the western part of the Jewish Quarter.

=== World War I, British, and Jordanian periods ===
Prior to World War I, there were some 2,000–3,000 Armenians in Palestine, mostly in Jerusalem, which was captured by the British in 1917. From 1915 and onward, thousands of Armenian genocide survivors from Cilicia (Adana Vilayet) found refuge, and settled in the quarter, increasing its population. In 1925, around 15,000 Armenians are believed to have lived in all of Palestine, with the majority in Jerusalem. During the British Mandate period, the number of Armenians is estimated to have reached up to 20,000. However, the 1931 British census showed only 3,524 Armenians in all of Palestine.

In 1947, around 1,500 Armenians from Palestine repatriated to Soviet Armenia as part of the Soviet government's efforts to boost Armenia's population by a large-scale repatriation of ethnic Armenians, mostly from the Middle East. This marked the beginning of the long-term decline of the Armenian community of Jerusalem. During the 1948 Arab–Israeli War, Armenian Quarter housed Armenian refugees from all over Palestine. An Armenian civil guard, armed with "makeshift weapons", was formed to defend the quarter from the Haganah shelling of the Old City. More than forty Armenians were killed in the fighting.

=== Israeli period ===
Jerusalem's Old City came under Israeli control in the aftermath of the Six-Day War in 1967. However, the Armenian patriarchate is the de facto administrator of the quarter and acts as a "mini-welfare state" for the Armenian residents. The Arab-Israeli conflict significantly affected the quarter's politically uninvolved Armenian population. According to Reuters, the Armenian Patriarchate "share[s] a view held by the mostly Muslim Palestinians—that Israel's designation of the whole city as capital of the Jewish state means its control of residence and building permits is being used to press Arabs and other non-Jews to give up and leave." According to one source, Graham Usher, a Palestine-based British foreign correspondent of several Western outlets, Israeli sovereignty over the Armenian Quarter would be the "worst future imaginable" for the Armenian community. Members of Jerusalem's Armenian community have voiced concerns about the Israeli government's policies and commitment to preserving their community's presence in the Old City.

==== Post-1967 land expropriation and settler expansion ====
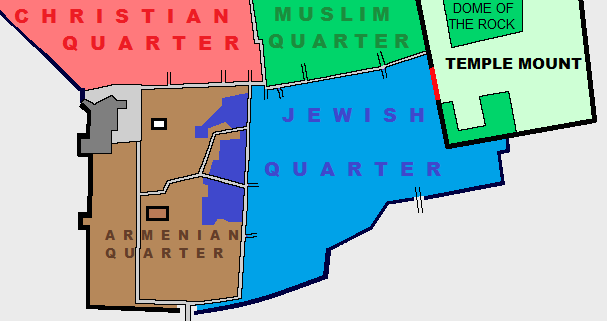
A map of the southern part of the Old City showing the four quarters and the area within the Armenian Quarter expropriated (in dark blue) for the reconstruction of an extended Jewish Quarter in 1968 (according to the Palestinian Academic Society for the Study of International Affairs).

During the Jordanian rule of eastern Jerusalem (1948–67), no Jews were allowed to live in the Old City. Following the 1967 war and the Israeli occupation of East Jerusalem, the Israeli government in April 1968 formally expropriated 116 dunams (29 acres) of the Old City to build and expand the Jewish Quarter. This expropriation encroached significantly onto the historic boundaries of the Armenian Quarter, resulting in the confiscation of Armenian church properties, commercial shops, and residential buildings.

Between 1967 and 2000, the physical footprint of the Jewish Quarter increased by approximately 40%, with Israeli state authorities and right-wing settler organizations acquiring 71 to 81 of the 581 properties within the remaining Armenian Quarter. The Armenian community has consistently expressed concern that the Jewish Quarter "will expand as the number of Jews in the Old City continues to grow while the Armenian population withers." The location of the Armenian Quarter athwart the main access roads between the Israeli-controlled West Jerusalem and the holy sites within the Jewish Quarter and the Western Wall has made Armenian properties a prime real estate in Israeli eyes.

=== Ongoing issues ===
A major obstacle for the Armenians residing in the Armenian Quarter is their Jordanian citizenship (from before 1967), because of which the Israeli government considers them "permanent residents"—the same status as Palestinians. The Jerusalem Post wrote in 2005 that the Israeli bureaucracy "considers Jerusalem Armenians to be Palestinians, which means endless delays in getting documents, and hassles at the airport." A map published by the United Nations Office for the Coordination of Humanitarian Affairs (OCHA) in November 2015 indicated the Armenian Quarter in the color reserved for Palestinian communities. According to Armenian researcher Tamar Boyadjian, because Armenians are considered Palestinians for all legal purposes they have difficulty obtaining travel and marriage documents.

Graham Usher wrote in 2000 in a publication of the Beirut-based Institute for Palestine Studies that the Armenians "were burdened with the status of being Palestinian 'residents' but ethnically Armenian. And indeed their lives, properties and heritage have been bound by the same Israeli constraints as their Palestinian compatriots." The Economist also wrote in 2000 that Armenians have faced restrictions on their lives similar to those imposed on the Palestinians, such as prevention of construction of new buildings in the Armenian Quarter. The limited space in the overpopulated district makes housing expensive and according to Boyadjian, "Most Armenians, given their current income, simply cannot afford to maintain their primary residence there."

The Armenian Patriarchate has voiced concerns about the Israeli police not treating spitting by Haredi Jews on Armenian clergy, students and teachers as hate crime. Furthermore, clergy who have lived at the Armenian monastery compound for decades do not have residency status, and, thus, "pay as tourists for public services such as healthcare." As of mid-2019 a memorial to the Armenian genocide on church property remained closed to visitors "because the municipality [had] delayed approving construction of the entrance."

==== Cows' Garden land lease ====
In July 2021, a plot of land called Cows' Garden (Goveroun Bardez) was leased by the Armenian Patriarchate to Danny Rubenstein, a Jewish businessman from Australia. The area is used as a car park and for group dinners. Father Baret Yeretzian, director of the Patriarchate's real estate department, who confirmed the deal, told him that the land was leased for 98 years and Rubenstein plans to build a luxurious hotel on the property. The Armenian Patriarchate said the deal, approved by the Holy Synod, was signed with "a corporate from the United Arab Emirates" and was expected to receive a net income of hundreds of thousands of dollars. The Mother See of Holy Etchmiadzin, the leading body of the Armenian Church, said the situation had disrupted the "internal solidarity and unity" within the Patriarchate and "reduce[d its] reputation." Catholicos Karekin II urged Patriarch Nourhan Manougian to "reflect on the concerns through proper interpretation, and to restore solidarity in the Brotherhood."

Ramzi Khoury, head of the Palestinian Higher Presidential Committee for Churches Affairs in Palestine, called the land transactions in the Armenian Quarter a violation of international law as Palestinians consider the area an "integral part of the Palestinian occupied territories." Armenia's Foreign Minister Ararat Mirzoyan discussed the issue with his counterparts from Jordan (Ayman Safadi), Palestine (Riyad al-Maliki), and Israel (Yair Lapid).

Surveyors started working at the site in 2023 and a sign was posted listing XANA Capital Group, a Dubai-registered Israeli firm. The Armenian Patriarchate of Jerusalem released a statement on 1 November 2023 announcing the cancellation of the agreement to lease the property. Bulldozers arrived soon afterwards and began tearing up the carpark portion of the leased land. The validity of the contract is being challenged by the Armenian Church through the Israeli courts.

Following the cancellation, armed Israeli settlers and private security contractors, accompanied by attack dogs and heavy construction machinery, made multiple attempts to forcefully seize the land, leading to physical altercations with Armenian residents and clergy maintaining round-the-clock vigils. Community leaders and international observers condemned the incursions as a state-tolerated settler campaign to dispossess the Armenian community and fragment the historic Christian presence in the Old City.

== Demographics ==
Writing in 2000, Graham Usher estimated that the Armenian Quarter had a population of 1,200. According to a 2007 study, the quarter housed 2,424 people (6.55% of Old City's total).

=== Decline of the Armenian population ===
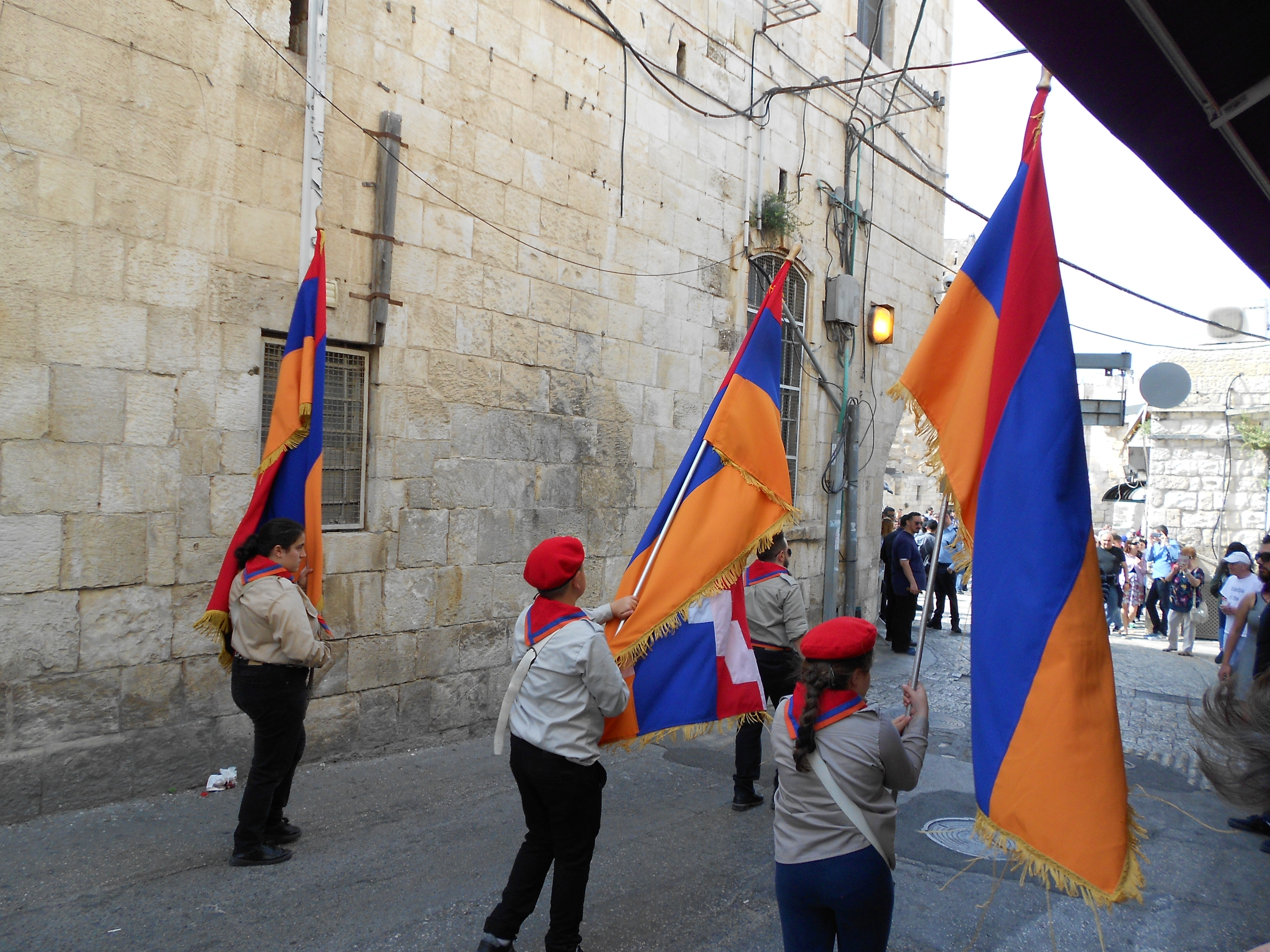
Armenian scouts during Easter parade

Armenians began emigrating from Jerusalem's Old City in the mid-20th century, being in the middle of the conflict between Arabs and Jews, mainly since the 1948 Arab–Israeli War, and what Daphne Tsimhoni characterized as "their feeling of loneliness." The lack of a longstanding political solution to the Israeli–Palestinian conflict for Jerusalem has been cited as the main cause of the decrease in the number of Armenians in the Old City, which fell by almost half from 1,598 in 1967 to 790 in 2006. Meanwhile, the Muslim population increased from 16,681 to 27,500 and the Jewish population from 0 (after their expulsion under Jordanian rule) to 3,089.

The exodus of the Armenians intensified following the breakout of the First Intifada in 1987. According to Tsolag Momjian, the honorary Armenian consul in Jerusalem, as of 2009 around 600 Armenians lived in the Armenian Quarter (out of the total 2,000 Armenians in all of Jerusalem). Two articles, published in 2010 and 2011, put the number of Armenians in the Armenian Quarter as low as 500.

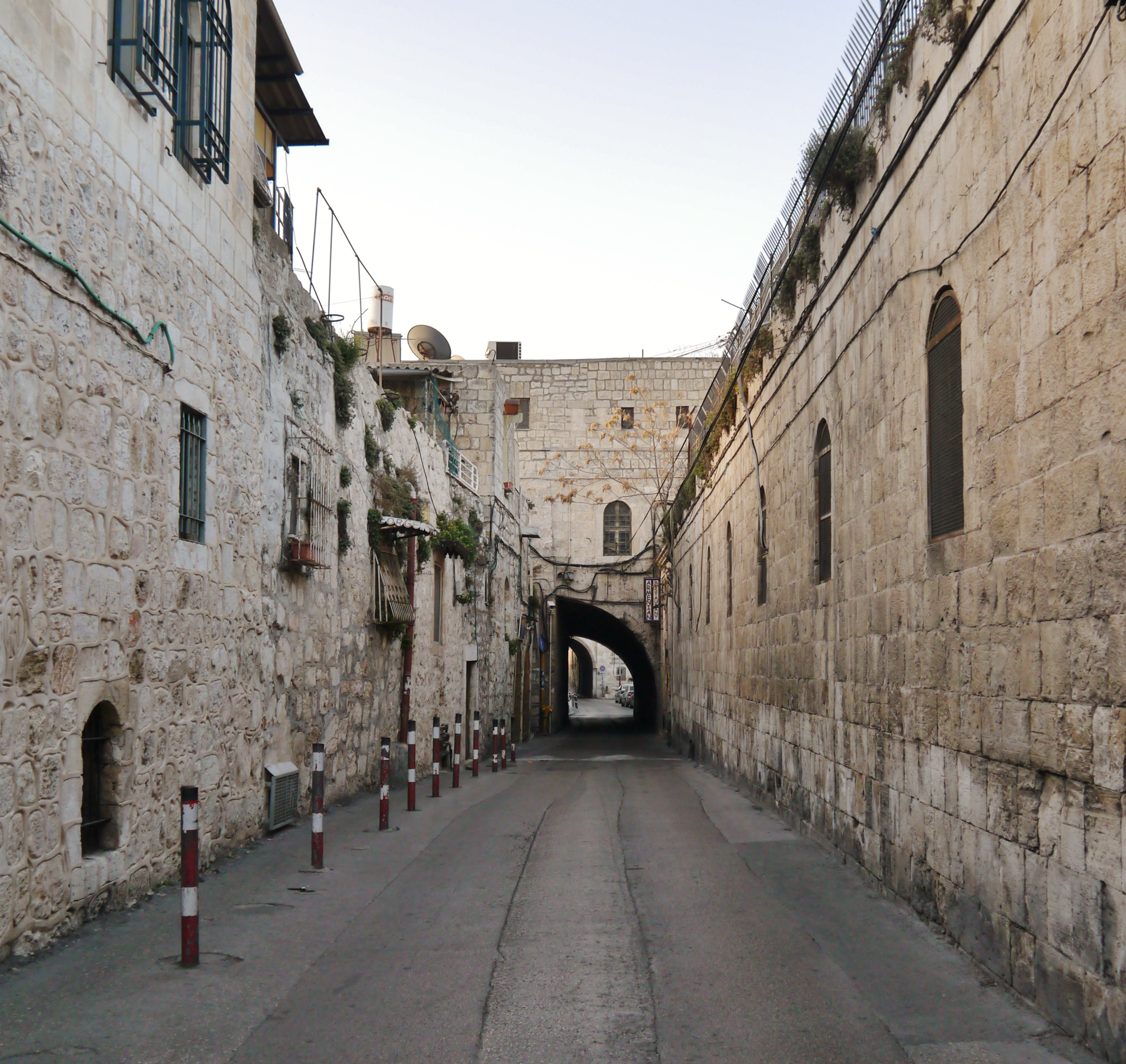
A street in the quarter

Despite the drastic decline in the number of Armenians, Israeli scholar Daphne Tsimhoni wrote in 1983 that "the existence of their church headquarters in Jerusalem provides for the continued presence of some clergy and a certain number of laity." On the contrary, American linguist Bert Vaux argued in 2002 that the Armenian community of Jerusalem is "in immediate danger of disappearing—the wealthy move into other parts of Jerusalem, and the closed environment in the Armenian Quarter spurs many to move to Beirut or the West." Armenian author Matthew Karanian wrote about the Armenian community of Jerusalem in 2010 as follows:

The survival of the community is today in peril. The population is dwindling. ... If the Old City were divided up today, the Armenians might barely command one street. They certainly would not lay claim to an entire Quarter, as they have for centuries.

==== Subgroups ====
Haytayan identifies three groups of Armenians living within the Armenian Quarter. The first group includes monks and clergymen (around 50), who live within the monastery. Lay people are divided into two groups: those living within the monastery compound, and those living in the Armenian Quarter, but outside of the monastery walls. Around two-thirds of lay persons reside within the monastery walls. Locally known as vanketsi (վանքեցի, lit. "those from the convent"), they number up to 700 people. They do not pay rent (or pay only a symbolic amount) to the patriarchate. Those living outside of the monastery walls are called kaghakatsi (քաղաքացի, lit. "city-dwellers"). Their ancestry goes back centuries. They pay only municipal taxes.

Bert Vaux identifies two subgroups of Armenians:

- k‘ałak‘ac‘is ("citizens" or "city dwellers") are the indigenous Armenian-speaking inhabitants of the quarter. They live outside the monastery walls, and attend the Church of the Holy Archangels (Hreshtakapetats).
- k‘ałt‘agans ("[im]migrants") are descendants of Armenians from various parts of the Ottoman Empire who moved to Jerusalem following the 1915 genocide. They attend services at the cathedral of St. James. According to Vaux, "In the period immediately after their arrival they were referred to by the k‘ałak‘ac‘is as zuwar, the Arabic word for ‘visitors’. The k‘ałt‘agans in turn are reported to have labelled the k‘ałak‘ac‘is as p‘is arab ‘dirty Arab’. The two groups each remained wary of the other for some time, and in fact did not intermarry on a significant scale until after World War II. Relations subsequently improved."

==== Language ====
The Armenian dialect spoken in Jerusalem is highly distinctive, because it was geographically relatively isolated from the rest of the Armenian-speaking world, and has been significantly influenced by Palestinian Arabic. Those Armenians whose ancestors came from Turkey following the 1915 genocide speak Turkish-influenced Western Armenian.

== Landmarks and institutions ==
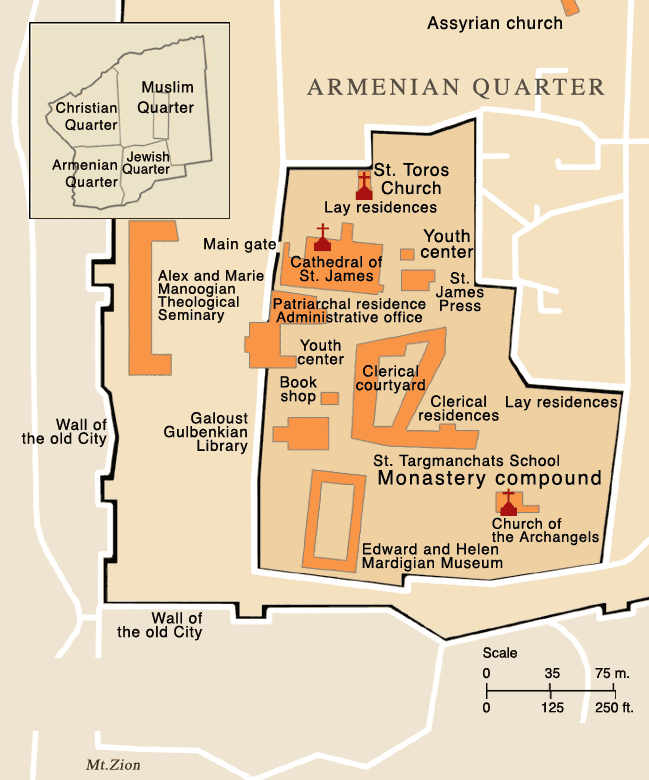
A detailed map of the monastery compound.

=== Armenian ===
==== Religious ====
- Cathedral of St. James (Սուրբ Յակոբեանց վանք, Surb Hakobeants vank) is thought to have been founded in the 4th century, but the current structure dates to the 12th century.
- St. Toros Church (Սուրբ Թորոս եկեղեցի, Surb T'oros yekeğetsi). According to local tradition, the church was built between 1270 and 1289 by Hethum I, the Armenian King of Cilicia in memory of his son, Toros, who was killed in a battle. The church was renovated to its current state in 1727.
- Church of the Holy Archangels (Սրբոց Հրեշտակապետաց եկեղեցի, Srbots Hreštakapetats yekeğetsi; Deir Al Zeitoun) was founded in the 12th century probably on the ruins of an ancient church in the 4th century.

==== Educational ====
- The Alex and Marie Manoogian Seminary (Ալեքս եւ Մարի Մանուկեան Ժառանգաւորաց Վարժարան) was founded in 1975 through financing of Armenian-American businessman and philanthropist Alex Manoogian.
- Sts. Holy Translators' School (Սրբոց թարգմանչաց վարժարան, Srbots t'argmančats varžaran) contains a kindergarten, elementary and secondary schools with a total of around 150 students (as of 2000).

==== Cultural ====
The Armenian monastery compound in Jerusalem is considered to be the "largest and most valuable treasury" of Armenian art and cultural artifacts outside Armenia. Some of the most valuable possessions of the Patriarchate are not normally on display, some of those being kept in a special vault. Among the treasured possessions are the miniatures of Toros Roslin (c. 1210–1270), the most prominent Armenian manuscripts illuminator (four of the extant seven are in Jerusalem), kondaks (pastorals) issued by the Catholicos and the Patriarch in 1064, Saladin's writ instructing Muslims not to harm Armenians in the wake of him recapturing Jerusalem from the Crusaders in 1187, the Ashtiname of Muhammad guaranteeing the Armenian Christians of Jerusalem their rights and properties, and one of the very few surviving medieval Armenian wooden church doors with carved inscriptions (a 14th-century specimen).

- The St. James Press (տպարան Սրբոց Յակոբեանց, tparan Srbots Hakobeants) was founded in 1833.
- The Mardigian Museum, full name Helen and Edward Mardigian Museum of Armenian Art and Culture, is housed by a two-storey, 700 m^{2} building. It was opened in 1969 but had to close again in the mid-1990s, given the very poor state of the building, a situation not changed at least until 2017, in spite of some renovation work being done after 2009. The museum exhibits a number of historical and religious artifacts, such as rugs, coins, copper cauldrons, ceramic tiles, an ancient world map in Armenian, and a replica of Gutenberg's printing press said to be the first one used in Jerusalem, etc. It also has a section on the 16 centuries of Armenian history in the Holy Land, and one dedicated to the 1915 Armenian Genocide at the hands of the Ottomans.
- Calouste Gulbenkian Library (Կիւլպէնկեան Մատենադարան), founded in 1925 through financing of British-Armenian businessman and philanthropist Calouste Gulbenkian, for whom it is named. Officially opened on 23 October 1932, it is considered "one of the world's most comprehensive Armenian intellectual resource centers" with its 100,000 book collection. On its opening day, it contained 25,037 volumes (14,518 in Armenian and 11,519 in other languages). Three decades later, in 1963, the number reached around 50,000.
- St. Toros Manuscript Library, founded in 1897, holds 3,890 inventoried and cataloged Armenian manuscripts, making it the second largest in the world, after the Matenadaran in Yerevan, Armenia. In 1931, the number of cataloged manuscripts stood at 2,720.

==== Other ====
- Armenian Garden

=== Non-Armenian ===
Churches (Note: "The remaining third includes churches of four other denominations: Syriac Orthodox, Greek Orthodox, Maronite and Anglican." "... four other denominations (Syrian, Maronite Catholic, Greek Orthodox, and Anglican) have churches in this part of the city.")

- The Syriac Orthodox St. Mark's Monastery is located on Ararat St. The Assyrians share the Armenians' miaphysitism and "hence tended to prefer to live under the 'umbrella' of the larger and stronger Armenian community."
- The Greek Orthodox Church of Saint George, with monastery
- Christ Church, a 19th-century Protestant church
- The Maronite Church (also known as St. Maroun's House), the only Maronite place of worship in Jerusalem
- Crusader Church of St. Thomas Alemannorum (possibly misread from "Armeniorum"), in ruins

Other

- Tower of David (Citadel)

== Political status and views ==
The United Nations General Assembly considers East Jerusalem, of which the Old City is part, to be "Occupied Palestinian Territory".

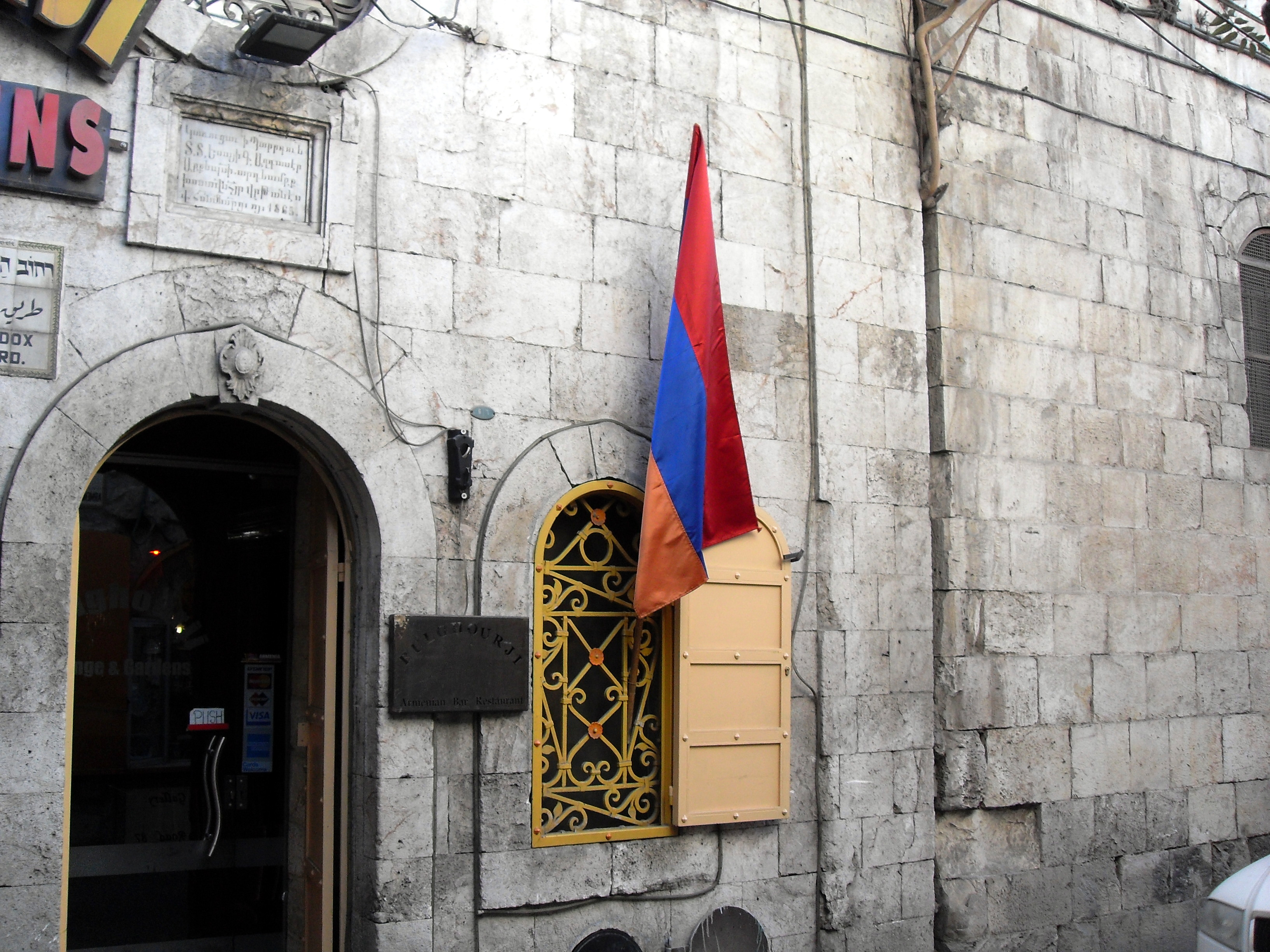
The flag of Armenia in one of the quarter's streets

=== Armenian views ===
The "quiet political consensus" among the Armenians of Jerusalem, according to The Economist, is that the Old City should be "neither Palestinian nor Israeli but rather an international 'space', governed by representatives of the three faiths ... and protected by the United Nations and other international bodies." According to Graham Usher, many Armenians cautiously identify with the Palestinian struggle, but few of them "would advocate exclusive Palestinian sovereignty over the Old City."

Armenians consider the Armenian Quarter to be part of the Christian Quarter. Armenia's Foreign Minister Vartan Oskanian in late 2000 stated that Armenia was against the separation of the Armenian and Christian Quarters into separate Israeli and Palestinian states.

Aram I, the head of the Holy See of Cilicia, one of the sees of the Armenian Apostolic Church (based in Lebanon), stated in a 2017 meeting with Lebanese President Michel Aoun that Jerusalem should be an "open city for the three monotheistic religions: Jewish, Christian, and Muslim, and that the religious rights of these peoples should be protected within Jerusalem." Aram I also rejected the United States recognition of Jerusalem as capital of Israel.

Many Armenians, while prioritizing their Armenian identity, do consider themselves part of the Palestinian people, and Palestinians in turn, recognize them as distinct, but also their siblings and compatriots.

=== U.S. Old City division proposal ===
At the 2000 Camp David Summit, U.S. President Bill Clinton proposed a division of the Old City, according to which the Armenian Quarter would be put under de jure Israeli sovereignty along with the Jewish Quarter, while the Palestinians would be granted a "certain degree of sovereignty" over the Christian and Muslim Quarters. Israeli Prime Minister Ehud Barak conditionally embraced the proposal, while Arafat rejected.

=== Palestinian views ===
Yasser Arafat rejected the US proposal at the 2000 Camp David Summit for the Old City's division and stated: "The Armenian quarter belongs to us. We and Armenians are one people." He told Clinton, "My name is not Yasir Arafat, it is Yasir Arafatian," making his name sound Armenian. "I will not betray my Armenian brothers," Arafat said about leaving the Armenian Quarter under Israeli rule. Commenting on his statements, historians Barry Rubin and Judith Colp Rubin wrote that "there was no reason to believe that the Armenians preferred his control [over Israeli control]."

In a 2011 meeting with the leaders of various Christian communities in Ramallah, Palestinian President Mahmoud Abbas stated: "The Palestinian leadership sticks to its position that considers the Armenian Quarter an integral part of east Jerusalem, the capital of the independent Palestinian state." According to the Palestine Papers, leaked by Al Jazeera in 2011, chief Palestinian negotiator Saeb Erekat proposed a geographical division of the Old City at an October 2009 meeting, according to which Israel would acquire sovereignty over the entire Jewish Quarter and "part of the Armenian Quarter."

=== Israeli and Jewish views ===
Israel maintains that all of Jerusalem ("complete and united"), including the Old City, is its capital according to the 1980 Jerusalem Law. In a 1975 article, Rabbi Yakov Goldman called for Israeli sovereignty over all of Old Jerusalem. He wrote of the Armenian Quarter:

In the Armenian Quarter only one sector is actually occupied by the Armenian compound. The Armenian compound has a wall around it enclosing the big cathedral and its adjoining buildings. The rest of the quarter had to have a name. It wasn't Jewish, it wasn't Moslem, it wasn't Christian. So they applied to this section the name of its neighbor Armenian—simply a convenient fiction.

=== Christian views ===
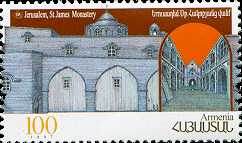
A 1997 Armenian stamp depicting the Armenian Quarter and the St. James monastery

In 2000 the Armenian, Greek Orthodox and Latin Patriarchs of Jerusalem sent a "strongly worded" letter to the negotiators at the Camp David Summit, stating: "We regard the Christian and Armenian Quarters of the Old City as inseparable and contiguous entities that are firmly united by the same faith." Pope Benedict XVI, during his 2009 visit to St. James Cathedral, stated:

From the first Christian centuries, the Armenian community in Jerusalem has had an illustrious history, marked not least by an extraordinary flourishing of monastic life and culture linked to the holy places and the liturgical traditions which developed around them. This venerable Cathedral Church, together with the Patriarchate and the various educational and cultural institutions attached to it, testifies to that long and distinguished history.

== See also ==
- Armenians in Israel and Palestine
- Armenian ceramics in Jerusalem
- List of Armenian ethnic enclaves
- Armenia–Israel relations
- Armenian–Jewish relations
- Christian Quarter

== Bibliography ==
=== Books & book chapters ===
- Azarya, Victor (1984). The Armenian Quarter of Jerusalem. University of California Press. ISBN 978-0-520-04749-5.
- Bremer, Joerg (2007). "Swan Song in the Holy Land: The Armenian Quarter in Jerusalem". In v. Voss, Huberta (ed.). Portraits of Hope: Armenians in the Contemporary World. Berghahn Books. pp. 271–274. ISBN 9781845452575.
- Hewsen, Robert H. (2001). Armenia: A Historical Atlas. Chicago: University of Chicago Press. ISBN 978-0-226-33228-4.
- Kark, Ruth; Oren-Nordheim, Michal (2001). Jerusalem and Its Environs: Quarters, Neighborhoods, Villages, 1800–1948. Wayne State University Press. ISBN 978-0-8143-2909-2.
- Naguib, Nefissa (2008). "Armenian Memories of Relief in Jerusalem". In Naguib, Nefissa; Okkenhaug, Inger Marie (eds.). Interpreting Welfare and Relief in the Middle East. Brill Publishers. pp. 35–56. ISBN 978-9004164369.
- Ormanian, Malachia (1931). Հայկական Երուսաղէմ (Armenian Jerusalem) (in Armenian). Jerusalem: St. James Press.
- Vaux, Bert (2002). "The Armenian Dialects of Jerusalem". In Ervine, Roberta R; Stone, Michael E.; Stone, Nira (eds.). The Armenians in Jerusalem and the Holy Land. Peeters Pub & Booksellers. pp. 1–19. (cached)

=== Journal articles ===
- Arnon, Adar (1992). "The Quarters of Jerusalem in the Ottoman Period". Middle Eastern Studies. 28 (1992): 1–65. doi:10.1080/00263209208700889. JSTOR 4283477.
- Der Matossian, Bedross (2011). "The Armenians of Palestine 1918–48". Journal of Palestine Studies. 41 (1): 24–44. doi:10.1525/jps.2011.XLI.1.24. JSTOR 10.1525/jps.2011.XLI.1.24.
- Haytayan, Laury (2011). "Armenian Christians In Jerusalem: 1700 Years of Peaceful Presence". Politics and Religion Journal. 5 (2): 179–195. doi:10.54561/prj0502179h.
- Martirosyan, Hmayak (2001). "Международный статус Иерусалима и местная армянская община [International Status of Jerusalem and Local Armenian Community]". Patma-Banasirakan Handes (in Russian) (2): 50–57. ISSN 0135-0536.
- Tsimhoni, Daphne (1983). "Demographic Trends of the Christian Population in Jerusalem and the West Bank 1948–1978". Middle East Journal. 37 (1): 54–64. JSTOR 4326524.
- Hopkins, I. W. J (1971). "The four quarters of Jerusalem". Palestine Exploration Quarterly. 103 (2): 68–84. doi:10.1179/peq.1971.103.2.68.
- Watenpaugh, Keith David (19 February 2026). "Forum: Israel-Palestine: Atrocity Crimes and the Crisis of Holocaust and Genocide Studies -he Pomegranate and the Orange: A Comparative Framework for Genocide in the Middle East – The Ottoman Armenian Medz Yeghern and the Palestinian al-Nakba". Journal of Genocide Research. doi:10.1080/14623528.2026.2631361.

=== Other ===
- Ammouri, Sa'eed (16 November 2020), Armenians in Jerusalem’s History: Armenian Palestinians Is How They Define Themselves, Raseef
- Khamaisi, Rassem; Brooks, Robert; Margalit, Meir; Nasrallah, Rami; Yunan, Michael; Owais, Abdalla (2009), Jerusalem Old City: Urban Fabric and Geopolitical Implications (PDF), Jerusalem: International Peace and Cooperation Center, ISBN 978-965-7283-16-5, archived from the original (PDF) on 28 September 2013 (archived)
- Manoogian, Sylva Natalie (2013). "The Calouste Gulbenkian Library, Armenian Patriarchate of Jerusalem, 1925–1990: An Historical Portrait of a Monastic and Lay Community Intellectual Resource Center" (dissertation). University of California, Los Angeles.
