= Calouste Gulbenkian Library =

Library in Jerusalem

- Armenian: Գալուստ Կիւլպէնկեան գրադարան
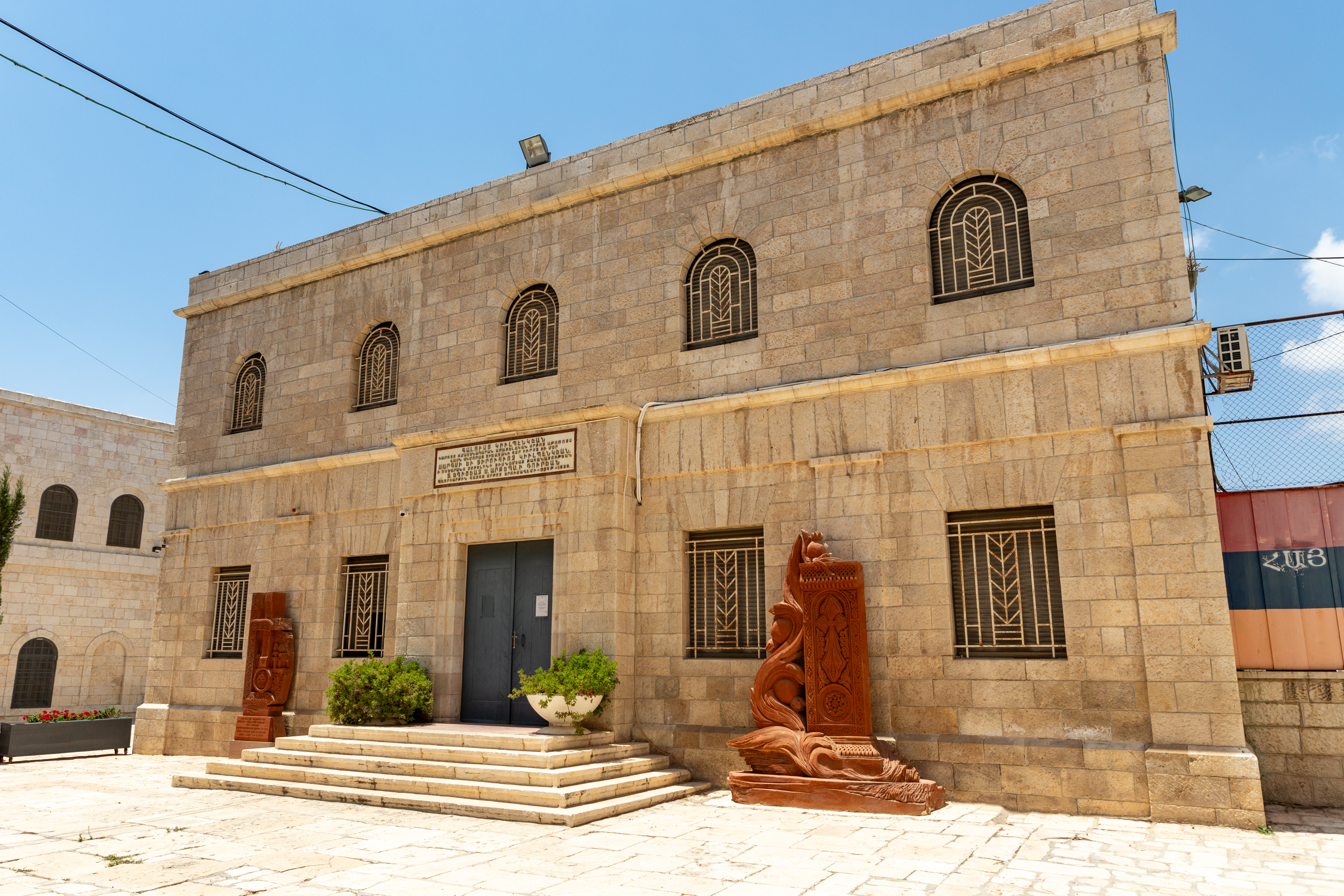
- 31.7737°N 35.2289°E
- Location: Armenian Quarter, Old City of Jerusalem, East Jerusalem
- Type: Library
- Established: 1932

Collection
- Size: 100,000 volumes

Other information
- Director: Father Norayr Kazazian

The Calouste Gulbenkian Library, located within the Armenian Patriarchate of Jerusalem, opened in 1932, and reopened in 2007, after an extensive renovation. The library is considered "one of the world's most comprehensive Armenian intellectual resource centers" with its 100,000-book collection.

== History ==
=== Beginnings ===
The library was envisioned by Patriarch Yeghishe Tourian (1921–1929) and was realized with the support of Calouste Gulbenkian, who funded its construction in honor of his parents and in commemoration of the Patriarch's fiftieth ordination anniversary. Although the cornerstone was laid in 1929, Patriarch Tourian did not live to see its completion. His successor, Patriarch Torkom I Koushagian, oversaw the opening on 23 October 1932.

=== Renovation ===
The renovation was funded by the Calouste Gulbenkian Foundation of Lisbon and the Saint Sarkis Charity Trust of London.

=== Reopening ceremony ===
The 2007 reopening ceremony was attended by members of the Gulbenkian family, key representatives of the Calouste Gulbenkian Foundation, and the Saint Sarkis Charity Trust. Their presence underscored the enduring connection between the family and the library.

The reopening ceremony featured remarks by several distinguished speakers, including:

- Archbishop Nourhan Manougian, Grand Sacristan of the Patriarchate.
- Martin Essayan, who spoke about Calouste Gulbenkian's ties to Jerusalem.
- Kevork Hintlian, a Jerusalemite author
- Astrig Tchamkerten, assistant director of the Armenian Communities Department of the foundation.

Father Norayr Kazazian, the current director of the library, outlined plans to digitize the collection with ongoing support from the Gulbenkian Foundation. The ceremony concluded with a musical interlude by seminarians and remarks by Patriarch Archbishop Torkom Manoogian, who bestowed the Patriarchate's Medal of Honor on Essayan, Tchamkerten, and Gulbenkian for their contributions.

=== Debris in 2012 ===
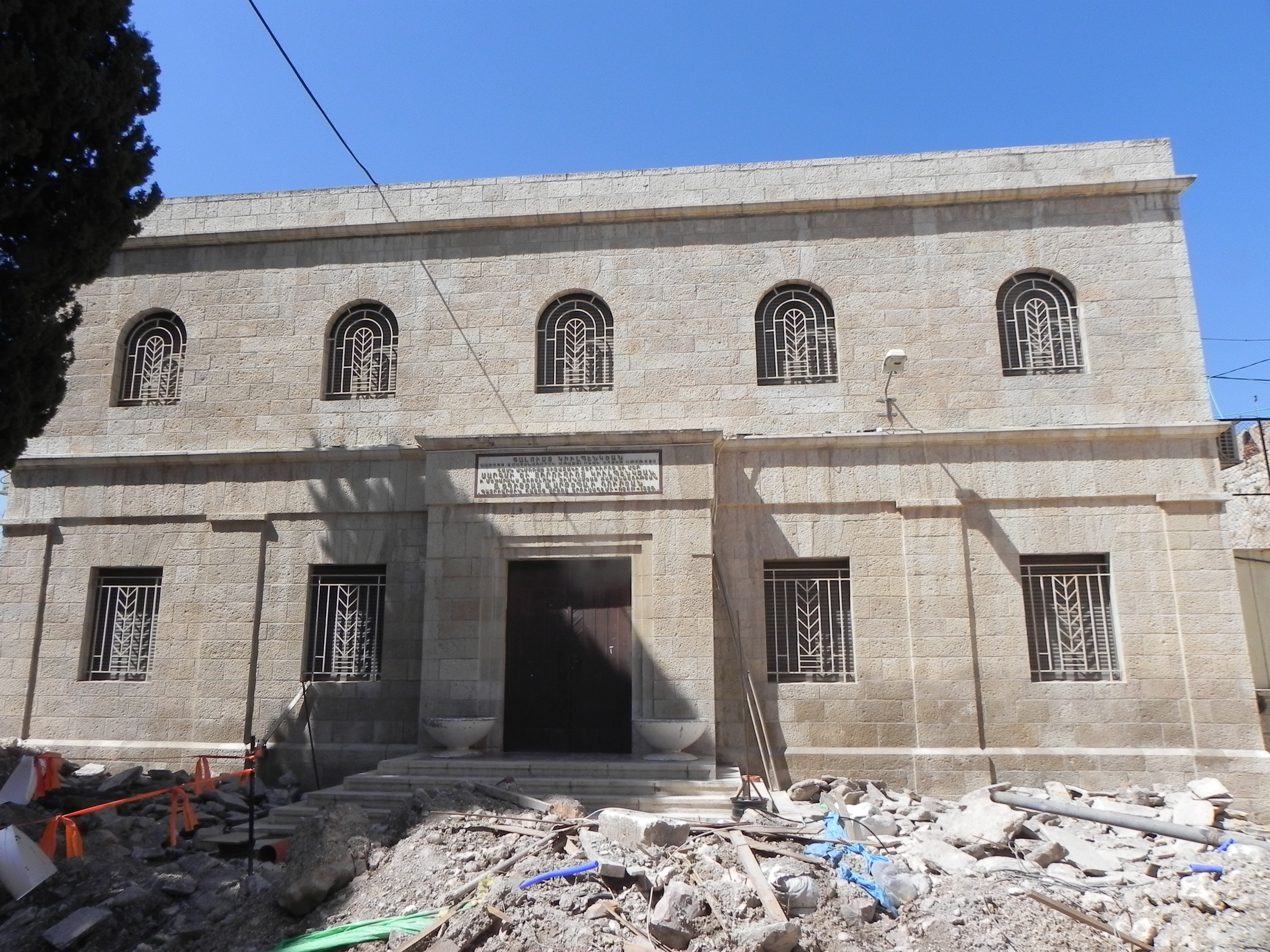
Debris in front of the library in 2012

In March 2012, there was some debris in front of the library.

== Current operations ==
The restored library houses over 100,000 volumes in a state-of-the-art facility with compact shelving, air conditioning, and temperature control. The collection includes Armenian books, European and Middle Eastern literature, journals, newspapers, and studies in Armenology. Its archive of Armenian newspapers is the third largest in the world, following the collections in Vienna and the National Library of Armenia.

The library aims to achieve the highest standards of preservation and digitization, ensuring its collections remain accessible to a global audience.

=== Library cat ===
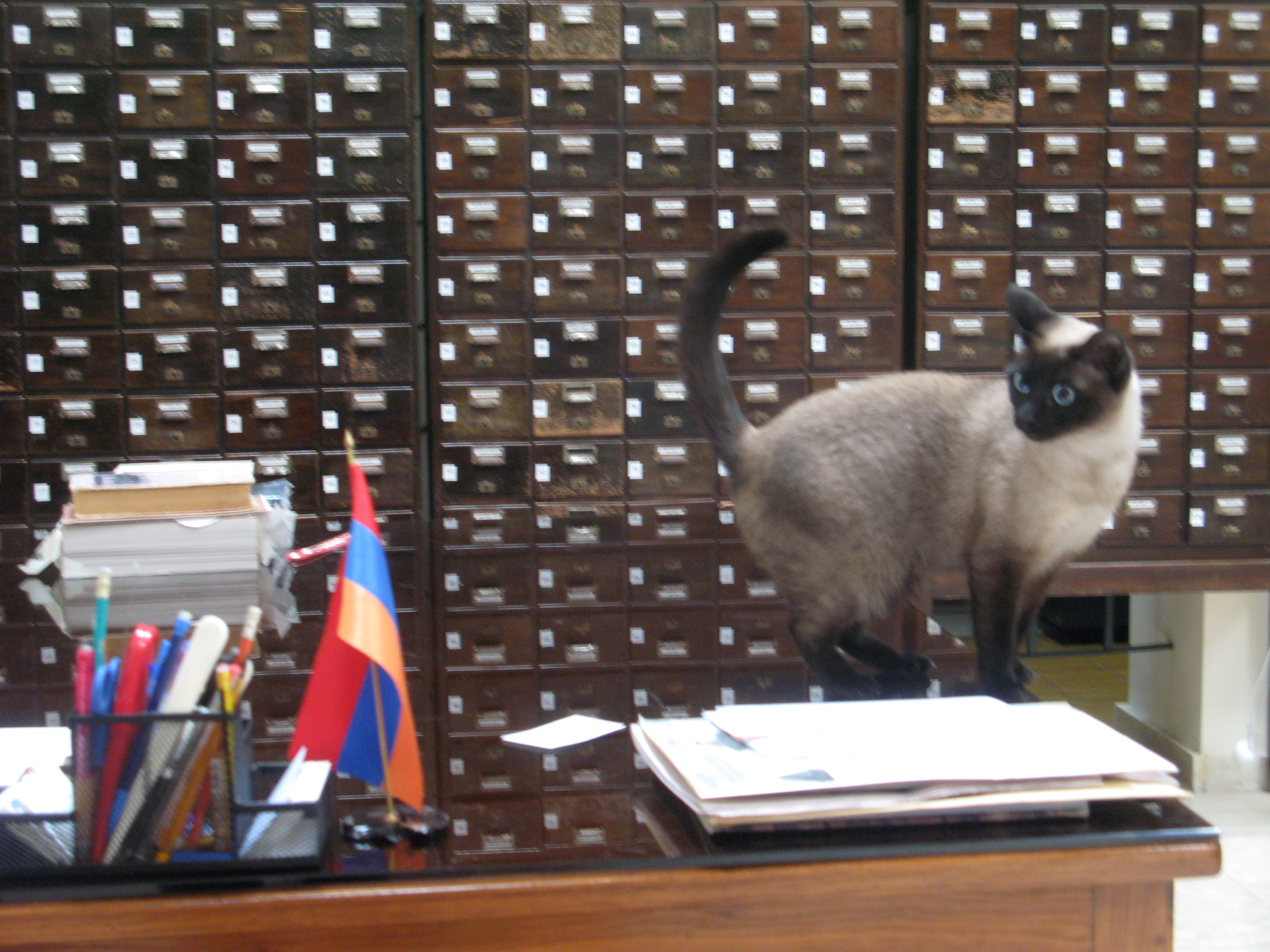
The Siamese library cat

The library has a Siamese library cat.

== Collection and legacy ==
The original collection was established through donations from successive Patriarchs, Calouste Gulbenkian himself, the St. James Brotherhood, the Armenian diaspora, and non-Armenian supporters. On its opening day, it contained 25,037 volumes (14,518 in Armenian and 11,519 in other languages). Three decades later, in 1963, the number reached around 50,000. Today, the library is one of the largest repositories of Armenian books globally, playing a crucial role in preserving Armenian heritage and scholarship.

== Bibliography ==
- Manoogian, Sylva Natalie (2013). The Calouste Gulbenkian Library, Armenian Patriarchate of Jerusalem, 1925–1990: An Historical Portrait of a Monastic and Lay Community Intellectual Resource Center (PhD thesis). USA: University of California, Los Angeles.
