= Church of the Holy Archangels, Jerusalem =

Armenian Orthodox Christian church in Jerusalem

Coordinates: 31.77327°N 35.22948°E

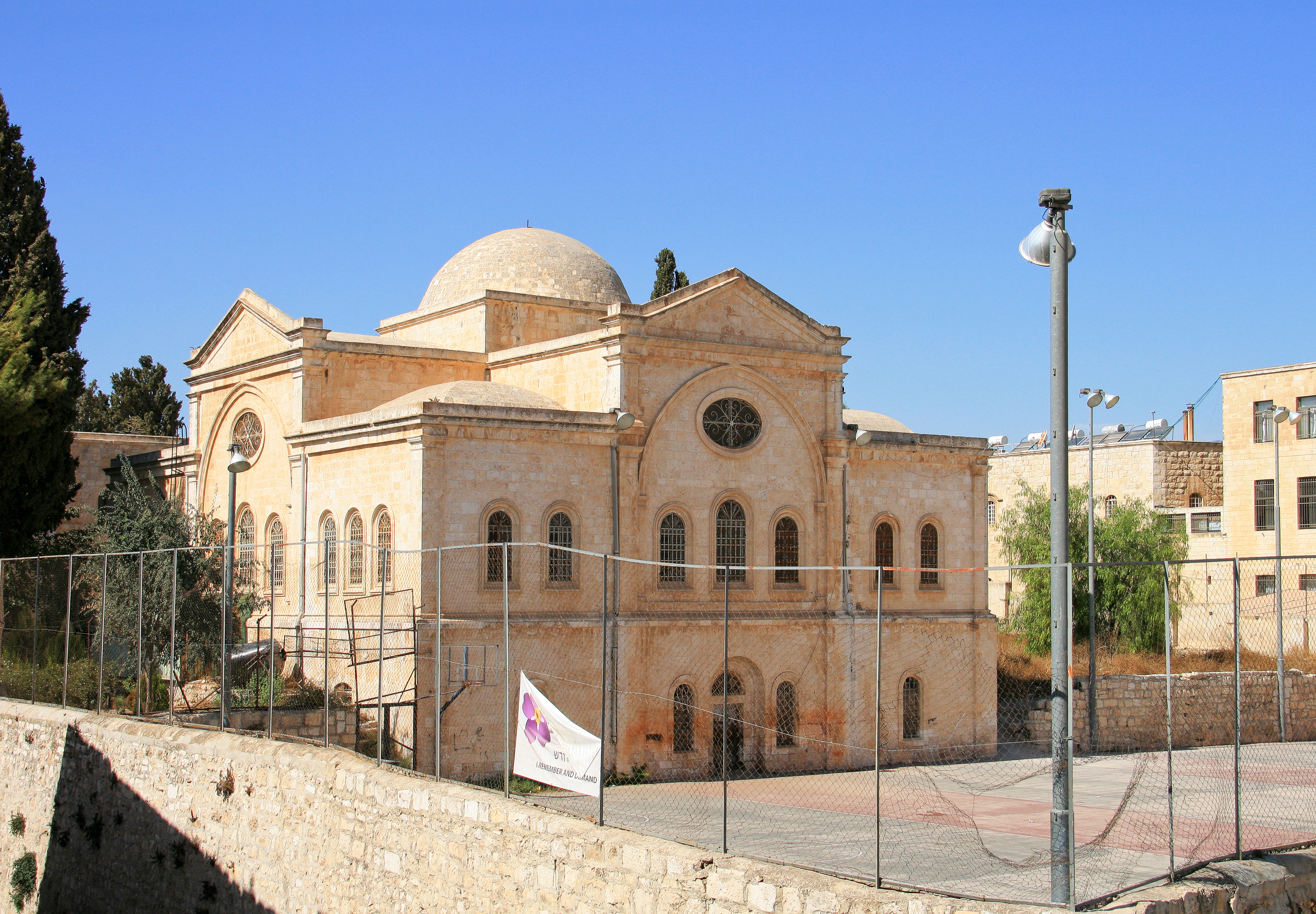
Church of the Holy Archangels

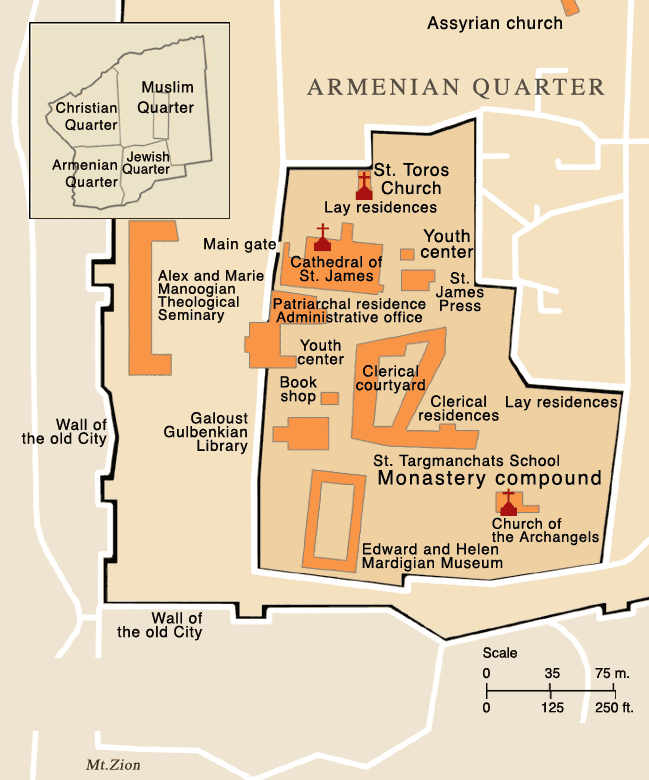
Location of Church of the Holy Archangels in a detailed map of the monastery compound

The Church of the Holy Archangels (Armenian: Սրբոց Հրեշտակապետաց եկեղեցի, romanized: Srbots Hreštakapetats yekeğetsi), also known as Deir ez-Zeitun (دير الزيتون Dayr az-Zaytūn, "Monastery of the Olive Tree"), is an Armenian Orthodox Christian church in the Armenian Quarter of the Old City of Jerusalem, Israel.

== Traditions ==
According to a tradition, this site was the house of High Priest Annas, although earlier traditions also placed the house at different sites, such as on Jehoshaphat Street or on Mount Zion.

One of the chambers supposedly was the prison of Christ. However, the gospels have divergent accounts about whether Jesus was brought to Annas' or Caiaphas' house/court. Therefore, the Armenian Monastery of Saint Saviour (the "House of Caiaphas", also called Dair Habs al-Masih, lit. 'monastery of the Masīḥ's prison') also claims to host a prison of Christ, where he was supposed to be held after the Sanhedrin trial. The olive tree that stands in the courtyard is traditionally claimed to be an offshoot of the tree that Jesus was bound to when awaiting interrogation by Annas.

== History ==
The monastery was founded in the 12th or 13th century.

== Bibliography ==
- Hewsen, R. H. (2001). Armenia: A Historical Atlas. Chicago: University of Chicago Press. ISBN 978-0-226-33228-4.
- Pringle, D. (2007). The Churches of the Crusader Kingdom of Jerusalem: The city of Jerusalem. Vol. III. Cambridge University Press. ISBN 978-0-521-39038-5.
