= Bert Vaux =

American linguist (born 1968)

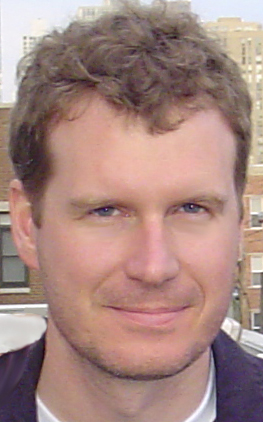
- Vaux in 2004
- Born: November 19, 1968 (age 57); Houston, Texas, U.S.
- Education: University of Chicago; Harvard University
- Known for: Vaux's law
- Scientific career
- Fields: Linguistics
- Workplaces: Harvard University; University of Wisconsin–Milwaukee; University of Cambridge

Bert Vaux (/vɔːks/; born November 19, 1968) is an American linguist, currently a professor of phonology and morphology at the University of Cambridge. Previously, he taught for nine years at Harvard and three years at University of Wisconsin–Milwaukee. Vaux specializes in phonological theory, dialectology, field methodology, and languages of the Caucasus. Vaux was editor of the journal Annual of Armenian Linguistics from 2001 to 2006 and is co-editor of the book series Oxford Surveys in Generative Phonology.

== Professional history ==
- Professor in Phonology and Morphology, University of Cambridge, 2021–present
- Reader in Phonology and Morphology, University of Cambridge, 2010–2021
- University Lecturer in Phonology and Morphology, University of Cambridge, 2006–2010
- Professor of Foreign Languages and Linguistics, University of Wisconsin–Milwaukee, 2003–2006
- Asst. and Assoc. Professor of Linguistics, Harvard University, 1994–2003
- PhD, Harvard University, 1994

Vaux's law (as labelled by Avery & Idsardi 2001, Iverson & Salmons 2003), which he first formulated in a 1998 article in Linguistic Inquiry, states that laryngeally unspecified (voiceless – fricatives) become [GW]/[sg] ([Glottal Width]/[spread glottis]) in systems contrasting fricatives without reference to [GW]/[sg] and they thus are to be aspirated or, more technically, pronounced with spread glottis.

== Selected publications ==
- "The Phonology of Armenian", Oxford: Oxford University Press, 1998. ISBN 978-0-19-823661-0
- "Introduction to Linguistic Field Methods", Munich: Lincom Europa, 1999. ISBN 978-3-89586-198-7
- "Rules, Constraints, and Phonological Phenomena", Oxford: Oxford University Press, 2008. (ed. with Andrew Nevins) ISBN 978-0-19-922651-1
- "Linguistic Field Methods", Wipf & Stock Publishers (January 2007) ISBN 978-1-59752-764-4
- "Laryngeal markedness and aspiration" (with Bridget Samuels), Phonology 22:395-436, 2005.
- "Syllabification in Armenian, Universal Grammar, and the lexicon," Linguistic Inquiry 34.1, 2003.
- "Feature spreading and the representation of place of articulation" (with Morris Halle and A. Wolfe) Linguistic Inquiry 31, 2000.
- "The laryngeal specifications of fricatives," Linguistic Inquiry 29.3, 1998.
- "The status of ATR in feature geometry," Linguistic Inquiry 27, 1996.
- "Eastern Armenian: A Textbook", Caravan Books, 2003. ISBN 978-0-88206-095-8

== Publications mentioning Vaux's law ==
- "Distinctive Feature Theory" by T. Alan Hall, Walter de Gruyter, 2001, ISBN 3-11-017033-7
- "Affricates and the phonetic implementation of laryngeal contrast in Italian", Martin Kraemer, University of Ulster, February 2004
- "An exception to final devoicing" by Marc van Oostendorp, Meertens Instituut/KNAW

== Notable press ==
Vaux is frequently consulted by the press for linguistic articles. For example, in 2004 he discussed product names that contain place names, such as Coney Island hot dogs. In 2005 he was interviewed in USA Today regarding the differences in regions of the United States about whether to call carbonated soft drinks "soda", or "pop", or "coke". In 2002–2003 his survey to create a linguistics map for the United States was mentioned in the press. In 2005 the San Francisco Chronicle mentioned his research about how musician vocabulary affects vocabulary at large.
