= Lion (disambiguation) =

The lion is a big cat of the species Panthera leo that primarily lives in Africa.

Lion or Lions may also refer to:

== People and fictional characters ==
- Lion (name), a surname and given name, including a list of people and fictional characters with that name
- Lions (surname)
- Leo Cantor (1919–1995), American National Football League player nicknamed "the Lion"
- Lennox Lewis (born 1965), British heavyweight boxer nicknamed "the Lion"
- Willie "The Lion" Smith (1893–1973), American jazz pianist
- Lion, a fictional character portrayed by Ajit Khan in the 1976 Indian film Kalicharan

== Arts and entertainment ==
=== Movies ===
- Leo the Lion (MGM), a mascot of Metro-Goldwyn-Mayer and some of its affiliates
- Lion (2014 film), a British film directed by Simon P. Edwards
- Lion (2015 film), an Indian Telugu film directed by Satyadev
- Lion (2016 film), an Australian film directed by Garth Davis

=== Music ===
==== Groups ====
- Lion (band), 1980s American rock band
- Lion, Taiwanese rock band formed in 2016 by Jam Hsiao
- Lions (band), American rock band from Texas formed in 2005

==== Albums ====
- Lion (Elevation Worship album), 2022
- Lion (The Hot Monkey album), 1989
- Lion (Stephen Lynch album), 2012
- Lion (Peter Murphy album), 2014
- Lion (Punchline album), 2018
- Lion (Marius Neset album), 2014
- Lions (album), a 2001 album by The Black Crowes

==== Songs ====
- "Lion" ((G)I-dle song), from Queendom Final Comeback, 2019
- "Lion" (Elevation Worship song), featuring Chris Brown and Brandon Lake, 2022
- "Lion", a 2008 single by May'n and Megumi Nakajima for Macross Frontier
- "Lion", from the 2013 Hollywood Undead album Notes from the Underground
- "Lion", from the 1984 Toto album Isolation
- "Lions", from the 1978 Dire Straits album Dire Straits
- "Lions", from the 1984 Tones on Tail album Pop
- "Lions", from the 2008 The Features album Some Kind of Salvation
- "Lions", from the 2009 Tune-Yards album Bird-Brains
- "Lions!', from the 2009 Lights album The Listening
- "Lions", from the 2011 Nothing Til Blood album When Lambs Become Lions
- "Lions", from the 2012 Walk the Moon album Walk the Moon
- "Lions", from the 2013 Adema album Topple the Giants
- "Lions", from the 2014 William Fitzsimmons album Lions
- "Lions", from the 2015 Ben Haenow album Ben Haenow
- "Lions", from the 2016 Coasts album Coasts
- "Lions", from the 2016 Skillet album Unleashed
- "Lions", from the 2017 Chase Rice album Lambs & Lions
- "Lions", a 2017 single by Skip Marley
- "Lions", from the 2019 Jenny Hval album The Practice of Love
- "Lions", from the 2018 Leon Bridges album Good Thing

=== Publications ===
- Lion (comics), a weekly British comic published from 1952 to 1974
- Lion (magazine), published by Lions Clubs International
- Lion Comics, an Indian comic book series

=== Other arts and entertainment ===
- Lion (video game), a 1995 computer game
- Lions (Kemeys), a pair of outdoor 1894 bronze sculptures by Edward Kemeys
- Lion (color)
- Lion (heraldry), a common charge
- Lion Brand Yarns, a US manufacturer of yarn

== Food and drink ==
- Lion (Australasian company), a beverage company that operates in Australia and New Zealand
  - Bega Dairy & Drinks, formerly known as Lion Dairy & Drinks (when a division of the above)
- Lion (chocolate bar)
- Lion brand foods, started by D. & J. Fowler Ltd. in Adelaide in the late 19th century
- Lion Brewery (disambiguation)
- Lion Cereal, a breakfast cereal based on the Lion chocolate bar

== Places ==
- Lion, Belgrade, a neighborhood of Belgrade, Serbia
- Gulf of Lion, south of France
- Lion Park, a lion wildlife conservation enclosure in Gauteng province, South Africa
- Lion Rock, a hill in Hong Kong
- Lion-sur-Mer, a French commune in the Calvados département
- Shi Islet (Lion Islet), Lieyu, Kinmen (Quemoy), Fujian, Taiwan
- Lions, Friesland, a village in the Netherlands
- Lion Inn, a pub in Blakey Ridge, North Yorkshire, England

== Sports ==
=== American colleges ===
- Arkansas–Fort Smith Lions, the University of Arkansas–Fort Smith
- Columbia Lions, Columbia University
- Lincoln University Lions, Lincoln University (Pennsylvania)
- Lindenwood Lions, Lindenwood University
- Loyola Marymount Lions, Loyola Marymount University
- Missouri Southern Lions, Missouri Southern State University
- New Jersey Lions, College of New Jersey
- North Alabama Lions, the University of North Alabama
- Piedmont Lions, Piedmont University
- Southeastern Louisiana Lions, Southeastern Louisiana University
- East Texas A&M Lions, East Texas A&M University

=== Association football (soccer) ===
==== Africa ====
- East End Lions F.C. in the Sierra Leone National Premier League
- Morocco national football team, nicknamed the Atlas Lions
- Nathi Lions F.C., a South African football club

==== Asia ====
- Lions F.C., a Philippine club
- Lions of Mesopotamia, nickname for the Iraq national football team
- Singapore national football team or the Lions
- Young Lions FC, an under-23 soccer team from Singapore

==== Europe ====
- Bulgaria national football team, also known as the Bulgarian Lions
- Livingston F.C., a Scottish football team nicknamed "The Lions"
- Millwall F.C., an English football team known as the Lions
- Sannat Lions F.C., a football club in Malta

==== Elsewhere ====
- Columbus Lions, a charter member of the World Indoor Football League
- Queensland Lions FC or "Lions FC", Australian soccer club formerly known as the "Brisbane Lions"

=== Australian rules football ===
- Brisbane Lions, a team in the AFL
- Fitzroy Football Club, a team formerly in the AFL, nicknamed Lions (1957–1996)
- Huonville Lions, a club currently playing in the Southern Football League
- North London Lions, a team based in London
- Subiaco Football Club, a team in the WAFL
- Suncoast Lions Football Club, a feeder club for the Brisbane Lions

=== Baseball ===
- Saitama Seibu Lions, a Japanese baseball team
- Samsung Lions, a Korean baseball team
- Tianjin Lions, a Chinese baseball team
- Uni-President Lions, a Taiwanese baseball team

=== Basketball ===
- Lions de Genève, from Switzerland
- London Lions (basketball), from Great Britain
- PS Karlsruhe Lions, from Germany
- San Beda Red Lions, from the Philippines
- Traiskirchen Lions, from Austria
- Zhejiang Lions, from China

=== Cricket ===
- England Lions cricket team, England and Wales' "second-tier" team (since 2007)
- Gujarat Lions, a T20 cricket team in the Indian Premier League from 2016–17
- Highveld Lions, a South African cricket team
- Surrey Lions, English county's Twenty20 and Pro40 team

=== Gridiron football ===
- BC Lions, a Canadian football team
- Detroit Lions, an American football team
- Braunschweig Lions, an American football team from Braunschweig, Germany

=== Handball ===
- Limburg Lions, a handball team in Sittard-Geleen, Netherlands

=== Ice hockey ===
- Finland men's national ice hockey team or the Lions
- LHC Les Lions, an ice hockey team in Lyon, France

=== Rugby league ===
- England national rugby league team, also known as the Lions
- Great Britain national rugby league team or the Lions
- Mount Albert Lions, a rugby league club in New Zealand
- Swinton Lions, a British rugby league club

=== Rugby union ===
- British & Irish Lions, a rugby union team representing the British Isles in international competitions
- Golden Lions, a South African provincial rugby union that operates the Lions (United Rugby Championship)
- Lions (United Rugby Championship), a South African professional rugby union team competing in the United Rugby Championship
- Rugby Lions, an English rugby union club based in the town of Rugby, England

=== Speedway ===
- Leicester Lions, a British speedway team
- Oxford Lions, a British Speedway team based in Oxford, England

== Telecommunications and computing ==
- LION (cipher), an encryption algorithm
- LION (cable system), a submarine telecommunications cable linking Madagascar, Réunion, and Mauritius
- OS X Lion, a version of Apple's operating system for Macintosh computers

== Transportation ==
=== Train ===
- British Rail D0260, a prototype diesel locomotive
- LMR 57 Lion, an 1838 early British steam locomotive
- South Devon Railway Eagle class, a South Devon Railway 4-4-0ST steam locomotive
- Stourbridge Lion, an early US steam locomotive built in Britain

=== Automotive ===
- Lion (automobile), a car model built in Adrian, Michigan, US, from 1909 to 1912
- Leyland Lion PSR1, a single-deck bus manufactured between 1960 and 1967

=== Maritime ===
==== Naval vessels ====
- HMS Lion, any of numerous British Royal Navy ships
- Hired armed cutter Lion, two ships (or possibly one ship) employed by the Royal Navy
- Lion (warship), five warships of the Royal Scottish Navy during the 16th century
- French ship Lion (1804), a French Navy ship of the line
- French destroyer Lion, a 1929 destroyer
- Lion-class destroyer, a cancelled destroyer class of the French Navy

==== Other maritime uses ====
- Lion Ferry, a defunct Swedish ferry company
- Lion, a ship of the Third Supply fleet to Virginia colony in 1609
- MS European Mariner, also known as MS Lion, a ferry
- Lion (1796 ship)
- Lion (1809 ship)
- SS Lion

=== Aviation ===
- Napier Lion, an aircraft engine whose first prototypes were built in 1917
- Lion Air, Indonesia's largest privately run airline

== Business, finance, and community ==
- Lion Group, a Malaysian company
- Lion (coin), a 15th-century Scottish coin
- Local Investing Opportunity Network
- Lions Clubs International, an international charity/service organisation
- Lion (Boy Scouts of America), an achievement level in Cub Scouts

== Other uses ==
- Leo (constellation), one of the constellations of the zodiac, known as 'the lion'
  - Leo (astrology), astrological sign of the zodiac, known as 'the lion'
- Lion Brand Stationery, an English paper company
- Lion Corporation, a Japanese hygiene and toiletries company
- Lion Oil, an American petroleum company founded in 1922

== See also ==
- Cameroon national football team or the Lions indomptables (Indomitable Lions)
- England national football team, nicknamed The Three Lions
- Penn State Nittany Lions, the intercollegiate athletic program of the main campus of Pennsylvania State University
- Lithium-ion battery, sometimes abridged as "Li-ion"
- The Lion (disambiguation)
- Gujarat Lion (disambiguation)
- Leon (disambiguation)
- Lyon (disambiguation)
- Lyons (disambiguation)
