= The Lion =

The Lion or The Lions may refer to:

== Art, entertainment, and media ==
=== Broadcasting ===
- WKPS, branded as "The LION 90.7fm"

=== Fiction ===
- The Lion: A Tale of the Coteries, an 1839 novel by Henry Fothergill Chorley
- The Lion (Kessel novel), a 1958 novel by Joseph Kessel
  - The Lion (film), a 1962 film, adapted from the novel
- "The Lion", the first episode of the 1965 Doctor Who serial The Crusade
- "The Lion", Beyond Westworld episode 3 (1980)
- "The Lion", Jackanory episode 99 (1966)
- "The Lion", Lassie (1954 TV series) season 1, episode 8 (1954)
- "The Lion", The Haves and the Have Nots season 5, episode 4 (2018)
- "The Lion", Thunderstone season 1, episode 6 (1999)
- "The Lion", Wai Lana Yoga season 1, episode 16
- The Lion, a 2000 Legend of the Five Rings novel by Stephen D. Sullivan, the seventh installment in the franchise's Clan War novel series
- The Lion (DeMille novel), a 2010 novel by Nelson DeMille

=== Music ===
- The Lion (album), an album by Youssou N'Dour
- The Lion (EP), an EP by Wild Adriatic

== Pubs ==
- The Lion, Potters Bar, Hertfordshire, England
- Lion Hotel, Adelaide, South Australia

== Sport ==
- The Lions (Finland), the Finland men's national ice hockey team
- The Lions (Singapore), the Singapore national football team
- The Lions, nickname for Aston Villa F.C.

== Other uses ==
- The Lion, an 1828 academic journal printed and published by Richard Carlile
- The Lion, a nickname for Theodore Roosevelt, the 26th president of United States
- The Lion, a nickname or epithet; see List of people known as the Lion
- The Lion (locomotive), a historic steam locomotive at the Maine State Museum in Augusta, Maine
- The Lion (mountain), a mountain in South West Tasmania
- The Lions (peaks), a pair of mountain peaks in British Columbia, Canada
- The Lions (agency), Fashion model agency in New York
- The Lions of Mesopotamia, nickname for the Iraq national football team

== See also ==
- Lakshyam (2007 film), a 2007 Indian Telugu-language film titled Bhai: The Lion in Hindi
- Lion (disambiguation)
- The Lion King (disambiguation)
- The Lions of Al-Rassan, a 1995 historical fantasy novel by Canadian writer Guy Gavriel Kay
- The Lions of Lucerne, a 2002 spy novel by Brad Thor
- The Lions of Mesopotamia, the Iraq national football team
- The Lions of Sicily, a 2023 Italian historical drama television series
