= Walker O. Cain =

American architect

- Born: Walker Oscar Cain; April 14, 1915; Cleveland, Ohio
- Died: June 1, 1993 (aged 78); Southampton, New York
- Occupation: Architect
- Spouses: Abby Jane Huston (m. 1941, divorced); Elizabeth Douglas McCall (m. 1973)
- Practice: McKim, Mead & White (1940–1961); Steinmann, Cain and White (1961–1965); Steinmann and Cain (1965–1967); Walker O. Cain & Associates (1967–1978); Cain, Farrell and Bell (1978–1986); Farrell, Bell & Lennard (successor firm)
- Buildings: St. Vartan Armenian Cathedral; Museum of History and Technology; Jadwin Gymnasium, Princeton University

Walker O. Cain (April 14, 1915 – June 1, 1993) was an American architect.

== Biography ==
=== Early life and education ===
Cain was born in Cleveland, Ohio, the son of Oscar C. Cain (1877-1954), a postal clerk for the railroad, and his wife Meta M. Gusse. He studied architecture for five years on a scholarship at Case Western Reserve University (B.Arch. 1938), and for two years at Princeton University (M.F.A. 1940). A brother, Howard B. Cain, also an architect, was for a time the president of the Cleveland chapter of the American Institute of Architects. A nephew, Bruce Cain, was an architect for many years with the US Naval Department.

During the summer of 1937, having won the Schweinfurth Traveling Scholarship (awarded annually by the school of architecture at Case Western), Cain traveled to France to study at the School of Fine Arts at Fontainbleau. At the conclusion of his course, he visited Italy, leaving Trieste aboard the SS Saturnia on September 20, arriving in the Port of New York on October 4.

In 1939, he received the Henry Adams Medal from the American Institute of Architects, awarded to the best student in each accredited architecture program, and in 1940, he won the competition for the Rome Prize of the American Academy in Rome (having won honorable mention in 1938 and 1939).

=== Architectural career ===
Having graduated from Princeton and unable to travel to Rome on account of the war in Europe, Cain moved to New York to join the firm of McKim, Mead & White. He was named an associate in 1951, and after the death in February 1961 of James Kellum Smith, the firm’s last surviving partner, several of the firm’s senior employees, including Cain, formed the firm Steinmann, Cain and White, in order to complete the older firm’s outstanding projects. Cornelius White (no relation to Stanford White) died in 1962, and in 1965, the firm reorganized as Steinmann and Cain, succeeded in 1967 by Walker O. Cain & Associates.

=== Honors ===
Walker Cain was made a fellow of the American Institute of Architects in 1968. He was elected chairman of the board of the American Academy in Rome in 1974 and served in that capacity until 1984. In 1962, he was elected an Associate National Academician, and in 1975, a full National Academician, by the membership of the National Academy of Design.

=== Personal life ===
In June 1941, Walker Cain married Abby Jane Huston (the marriage was dissolved by divorce). They had two children, Susan Berry Cain and Tamma Huston Cain.

On July 27, 1973, He married Elizabeth Douglas McCall (1919-1996). According to The New York Times:

The Rev. William A. McQuoid performed the ceremony in the Dana Chapel of the Madison Avenue Presbyterian Church. He was assisted by the Rev. Dr. John C. Coburn, rector of St. James' Episcopal Church. The bride, daughter of Mrs. Arthur May McCall of Florence, S. C., and the late Mr. McCall, was divorced from Arthur A. Houghton Jr., board chairman of Steuben Glass. The bridegroom, son of Mrs. Oscar C. Cain of Cleveland and the late Mr. Cain, also has been previously married and divorced. He is senior partner of Walker O. Cain Associates, an architectural firm here.

His second marriage brought Cain yet another honor. A reporter for the Times noted that the 1974 edition of the Social Register "contains few surprises," while observing that,

As usual, some names have been dropped and others added, as a rule through marriage to people already listed...Arthur A. Houghton Jr., board chairman of Steuben Glass, and his former wife, Mrs. Elizabeth McCall Houghton, both remarried in 1973 and their new spouses, the former Mrs. Nina Rodale Horstmann, and Walker O. Cain, a New York architect, were welcomed to the fold.

Walker Cain died in Southampton, New York in 1993. Elizabeth Cain died in New York City in 1996.

== Notable works ==
=== McKim, Mead & White ===
In his entry in Who's Who in America, 1972-1973, Cain listed among his built works projects completed before McKim, Mead & White’s dissolution in 1961. These include:

- Jafet Library, American University of Beirut, Lebanon (completed 1951); McKim, Mead & White.
- Schaffer Library, Union College, Schenectady, NY (dedicated April 29, 1961); McKim, Mead & White.

=== Steinmann, Cain and White (and successor firms) ===
Projects completed after 1961 include:

- Caldwell Field House, Princeton University (completed 1963); Steinmann, Cain and White.
- Museum of History and Technology, Smithsonian Institution, Washington D.C. (completed 1964); begun McKim, Mead & White; completed Steinmann, Cain and White.
- Hawthorne-Longfellow Library, Bowdoin College, Brunswick, Maine (completed 1965); Steinmann, Cain and White.
- Princeton University Museum and Fine Arts Library (completed 1966); Steinmann and Cain.
- St. Vartan Armenian Cathedral, Second Avenue and 34th Street, Manhattan (begun 1963; consecrated 1968); Steinmann, Cain and White.
- Jadwin Gymnasium, Princeton University (begun 1964; completed 1969); Walker O. Cain and Associates.
- Computing Center, Princeton University (completed 1970).
- Casco National Bank Building, Portland, Maine (completed 1970); Walker O. Cain and Associates.
- the Maine State Museum, Augusta, Maine (dedicated 1971); Walker O. Cain and Associates.
- Maynard Building, Brooklyn, NY (completed 1976); Walker O. Cain and Associates
- Mickel Library, Converse College, Spartanburg, South Carolina (completed 1980); Walker O. Cain, of Cain, Farrell and Bell.

Cain was a skilled architectural renderer. Among the many examples are drawings he made of the collegiate chapter houses of St. Anthony Hall (aka Delta Psi fraternity) for their 1947 membership directory.

=== Gallery ===
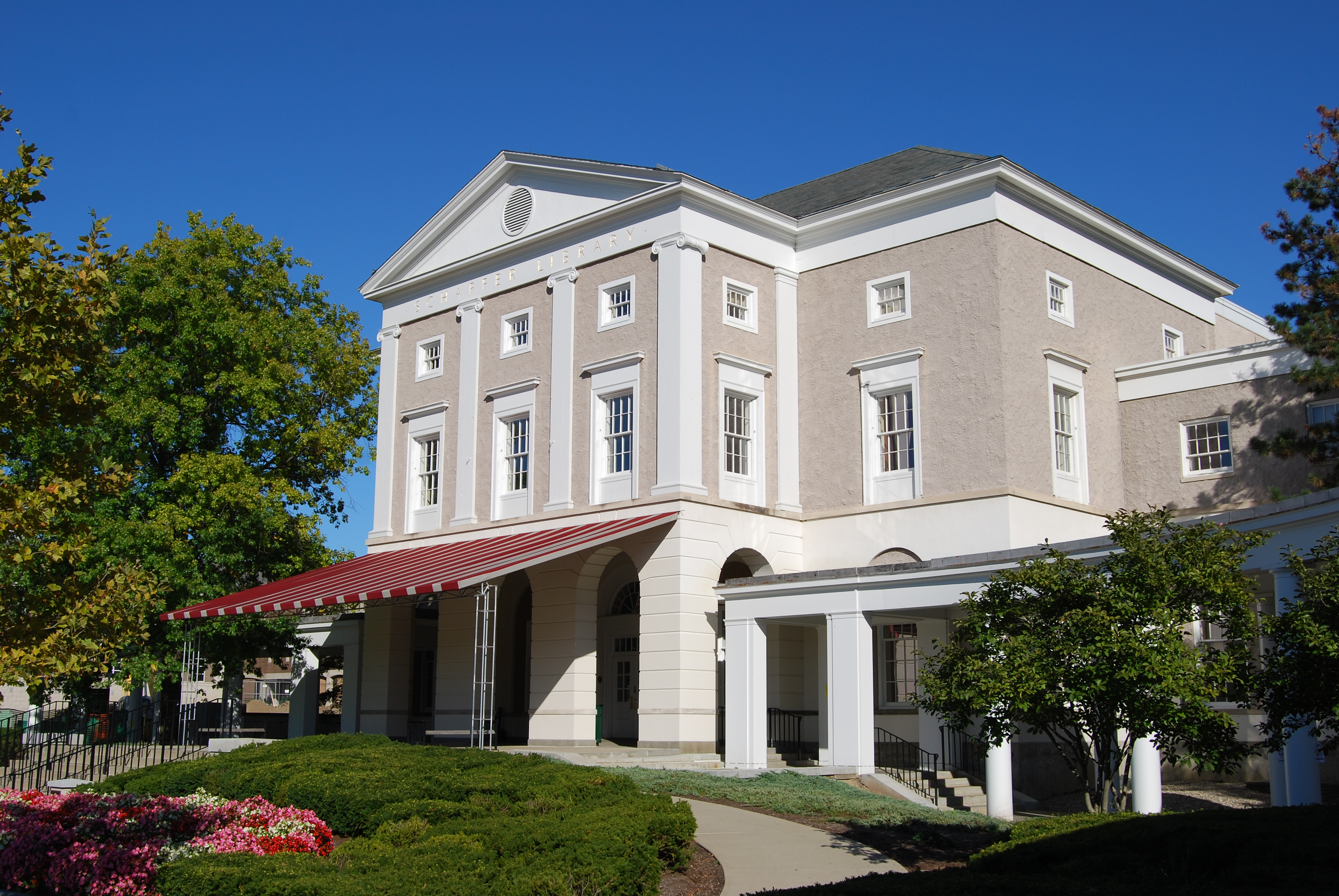
Schaffer Library, Union College

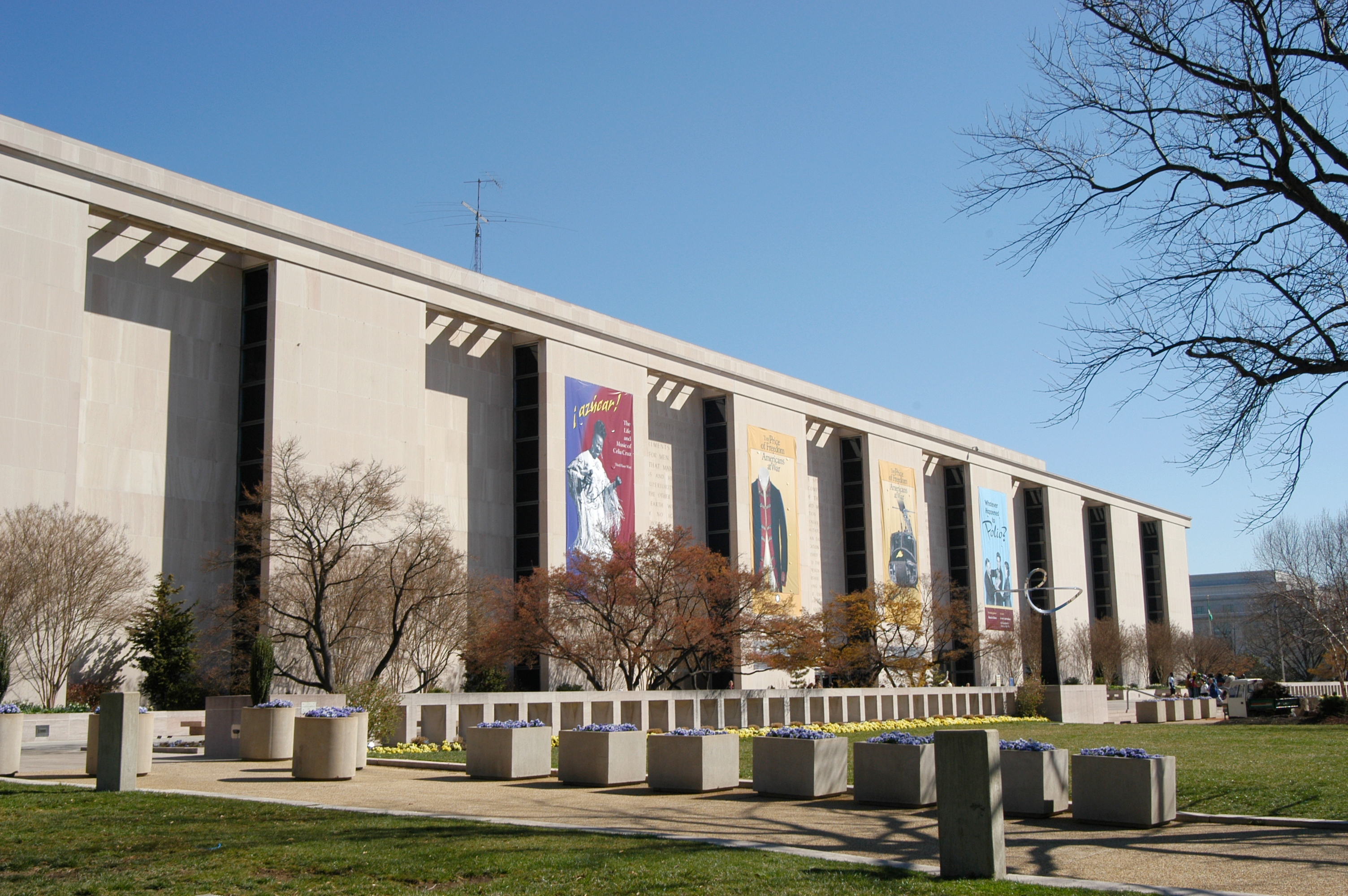
Museum of History and Technology (National Museum of American History)

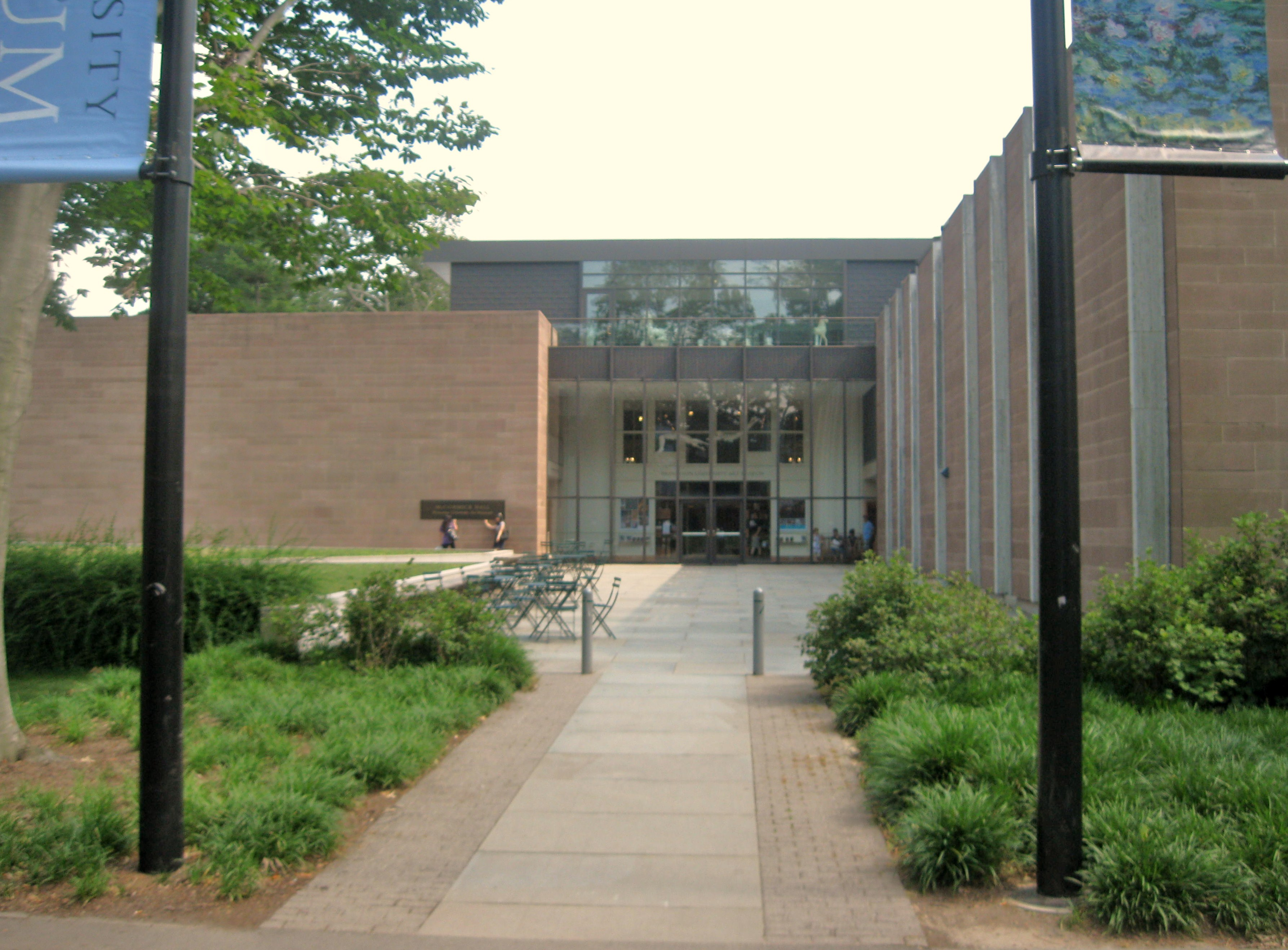
Princeton University Art Museum

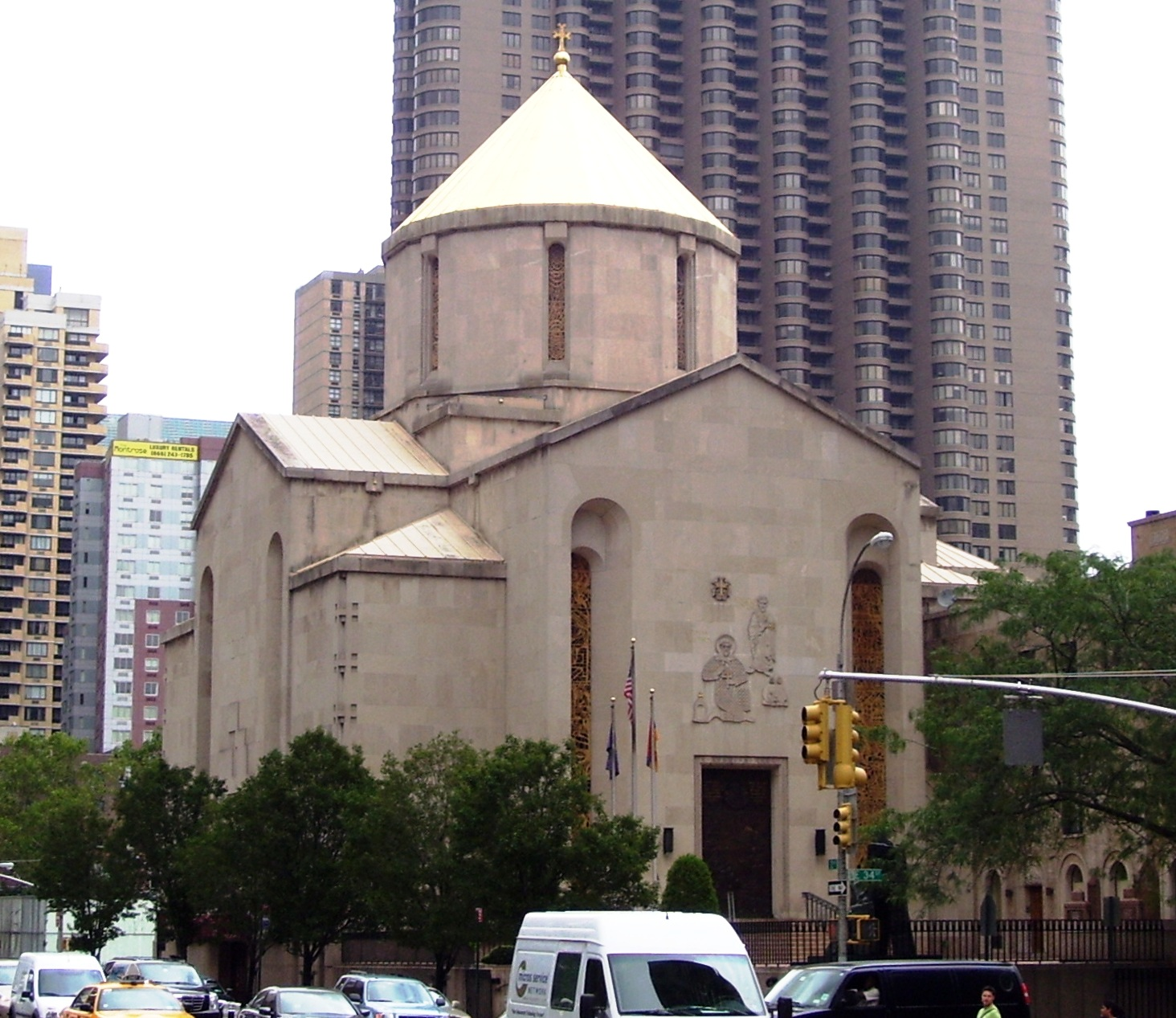
St. Vartan Armenian Cathedral

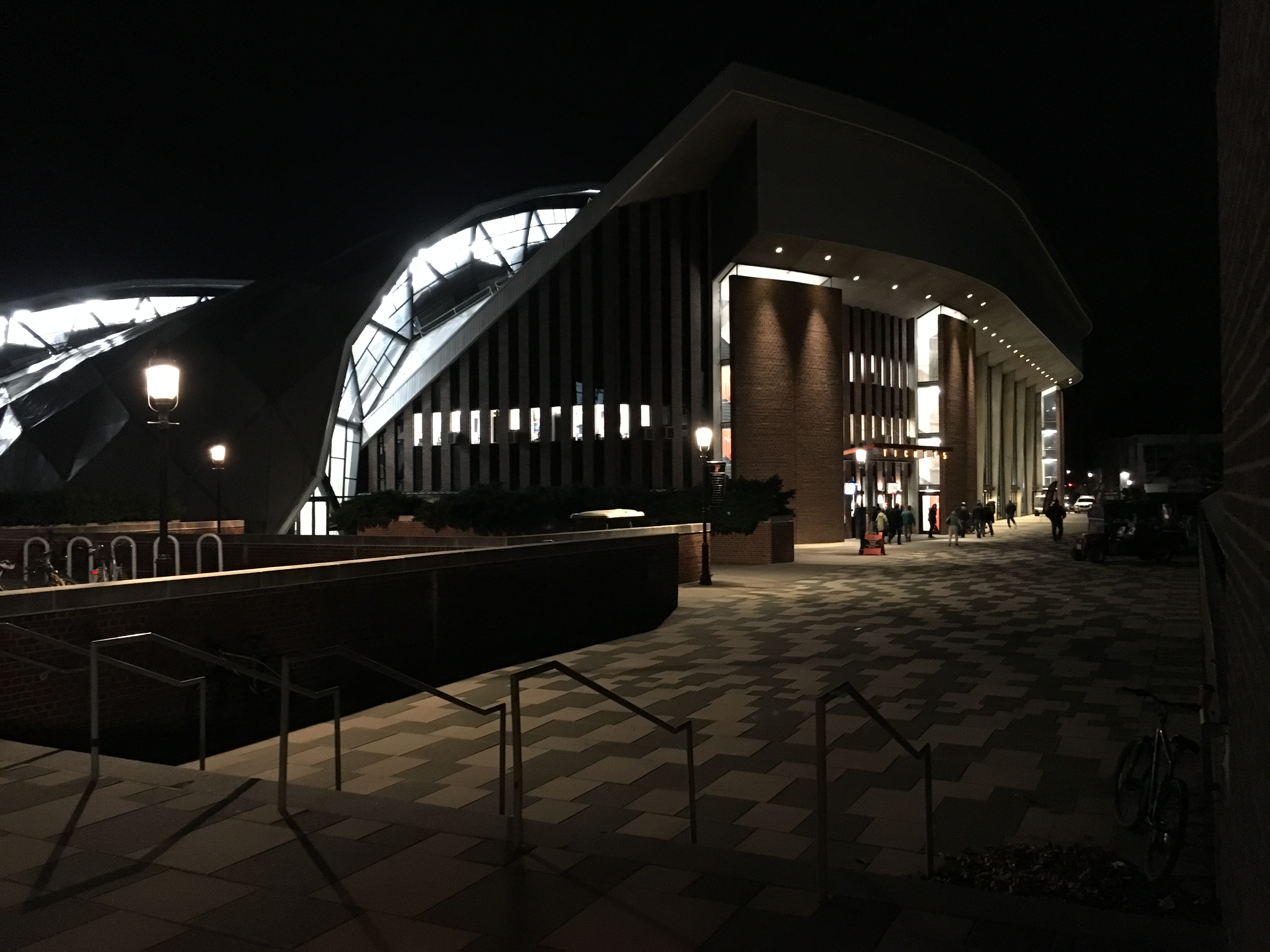
Jadwin Gymnasium

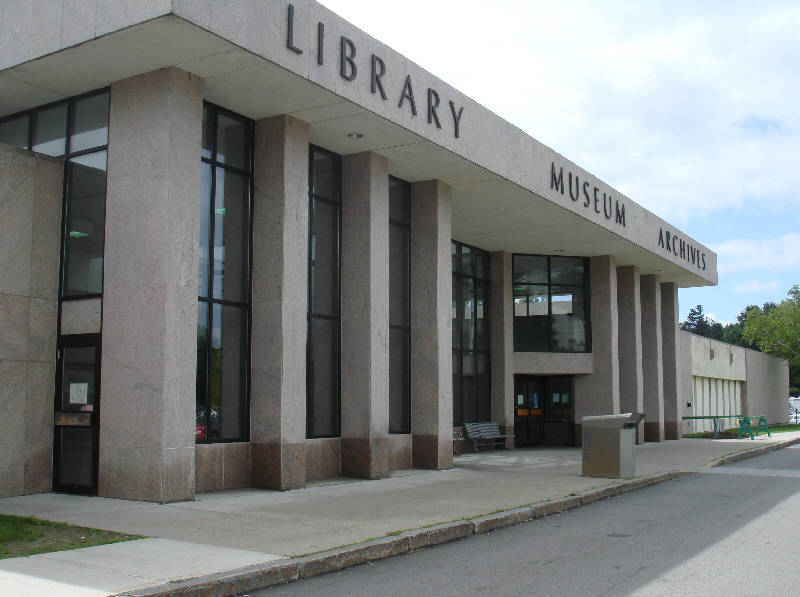
Maine State Library and Museum

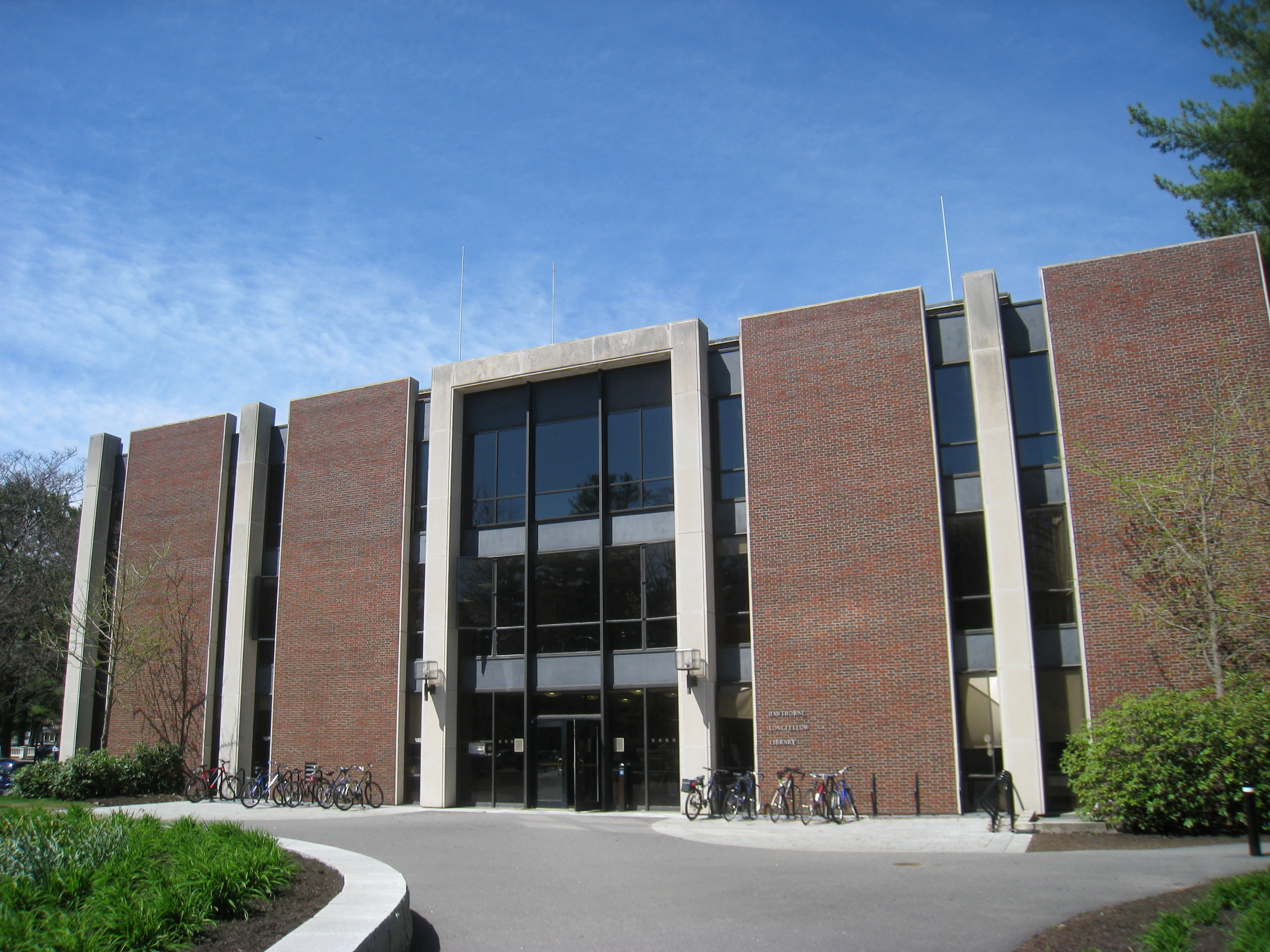
Hawthorne-Longfellow Library of Bowdoin College

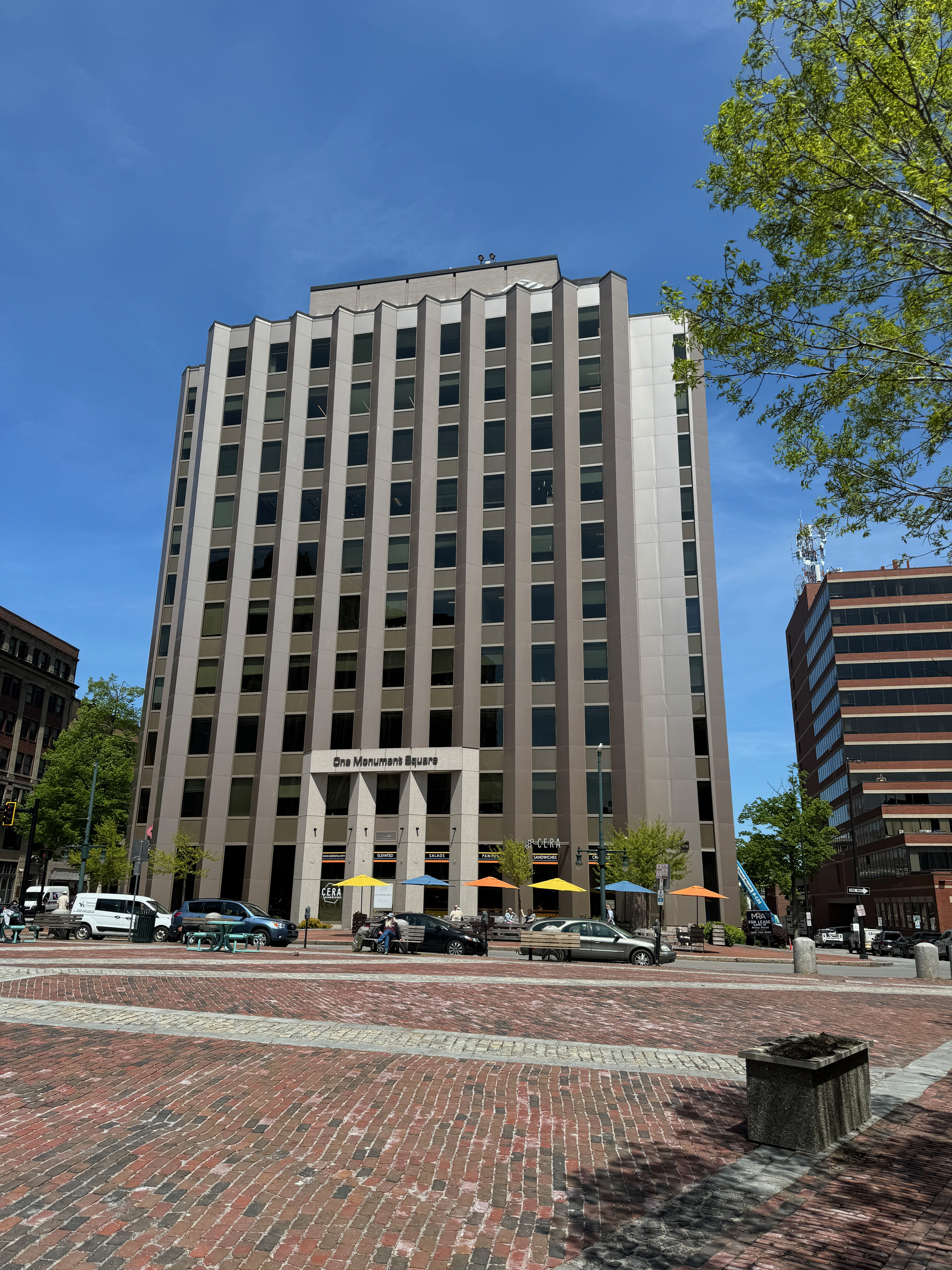
One Monument Square in Portland, Maine

== Bibliography ==
- Fred N. Severud (author) and Walker O. Cain (illustrator), "Forecasting a New Era For Concrete," Architectural Record, Vol 106, No 6 (December 1949).
- E. Powis Jones (author) and Walker O. Cain (illustrator). Favorite Fountains in New York City: a Guide to Artistic and Unusual Fountains in the City’s Parks, (Park Association of New York City, 1963).
