= St. Vartan Armenian Cathedral =

Cathedral in Manhattan, New York

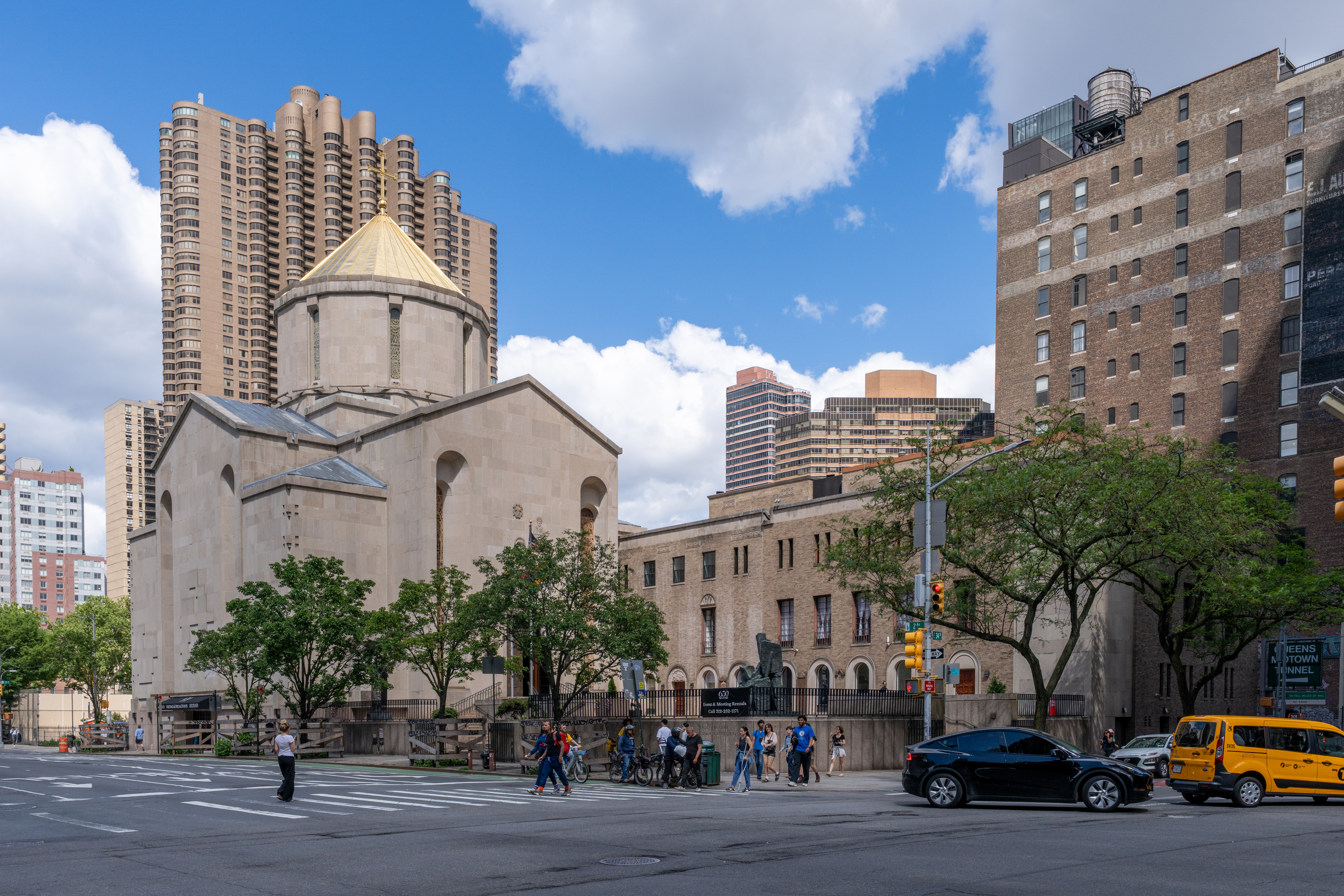
- The cathedral in 2026
- St. Vartan Armenian Cathedral
- 40.745131°N 73.975252°W
- Address: 630 Second Avenue; New York, NY
- Country: United States
- Denomination: Armenian Apostolic Church (Mother See of Holy Etchmiadzin)
- Website: stvartan.org

History
- Status: Cathedral
- Dedication: St. Vartan
- Consecrated: April 28, 1968

Architecture
- Architect(s): Walker O. Cain; Rafayel Israyelian
- Style: Armenian
- Groundbreaking: May 2, 1965
- Construction cost: $3.5 million

Administration
- Diocese: Armenian Church of America (Eastern)

St. Vartan Armenian Cathedral (Armenian: Սուրբ Վարդան Մայր Տաճար) is a cathedral located on the east side of Second Avenue between East 34th and East 35th streets in the Murray Hill neighborhood of Manhattan in New York City. Built to resemble the Saint Hripsime Church in Etchmiadzin (Vagharshapat), it was consecrated in 1968 and is the first cathedral of the Armenian Apostolic Church to be constructed in North America. An Armenian cultural center and diocesan house are located adjacent to the cathedral, which serves as the headquarters of the Eastern Diocese of the Armenian Church of America.

== History ==
=== Planning and development ===
A campaign to build a cathedral was first launched by the Armenian Church of America's Diocesan Assembly in 1926, but the project fell victim to the Wall Street crash of 1929 and Great Depression. At the Diocesan Assembly in 1942, Archbishop Karekin Hovsepian, the primate of the church's Eastern Diocese, called for the creation of a fund to build a cathedral, offices for the diocese, and a cultural center. Hovsepian wrote an editorial in the August issue of Hayastanyaitz Yegeghetzi that outlined the need for a cathedral and residences for the primate and other priests.

A decision to build a cathedral in New York City was reached at the Diocesan Assembly in 1945, after Bishop Tiran Nersoyan had been elected as the new primate of the diocese. It was the first cathedral of the Armenian Apostolic Church to be constructed in North America. A campaign to raise $1,000,000 for the project was announced by Bishop Nersoyan in 1947. At the time, the Armenian prelates were residing at the parish house for St. Peter's Episcopal Church on West 20th Street.

A site for the cathedral was selected near the former Armenian quarter on the east side of Manhattan at the intersection of Second Avenue and East 34th Street, a location which had reasonable land prices and convenient access to the Queens–Midtown Tunnel. The initial purchase of property for the cathedral was announced in 1949; a L-shaped parcel consisting of 15,500 square feet (1,440 m^{2}) of land had been acquired along East 35th Street and Tunnel Approach Street. Most of this site was purchased from Columbia University, as the buildings for its College of Dental and Oral Surgery had been torn down to make way for the new roadway providing access to the tunnel.

The initial property acquisitions also included a building at 630 Second Avenue, which was remodeled to serve as the temporary home of the primate and the diocesan offices. By 1952, the size of the parcel owned by the church had grown to about 22,000 square feet (2,000 m^{2}) through the acquisitions of additional lots on the block. This exceeded the minimum area of 20,000 square feet (1,900 m^{2}) that was needed for the project and allowed for the plans to advance. The new property included additional land along Second Avenue, which would enable worshippers to follow the Armenian custom of entering and sitting facing to the east.

=== Construction and opening ===
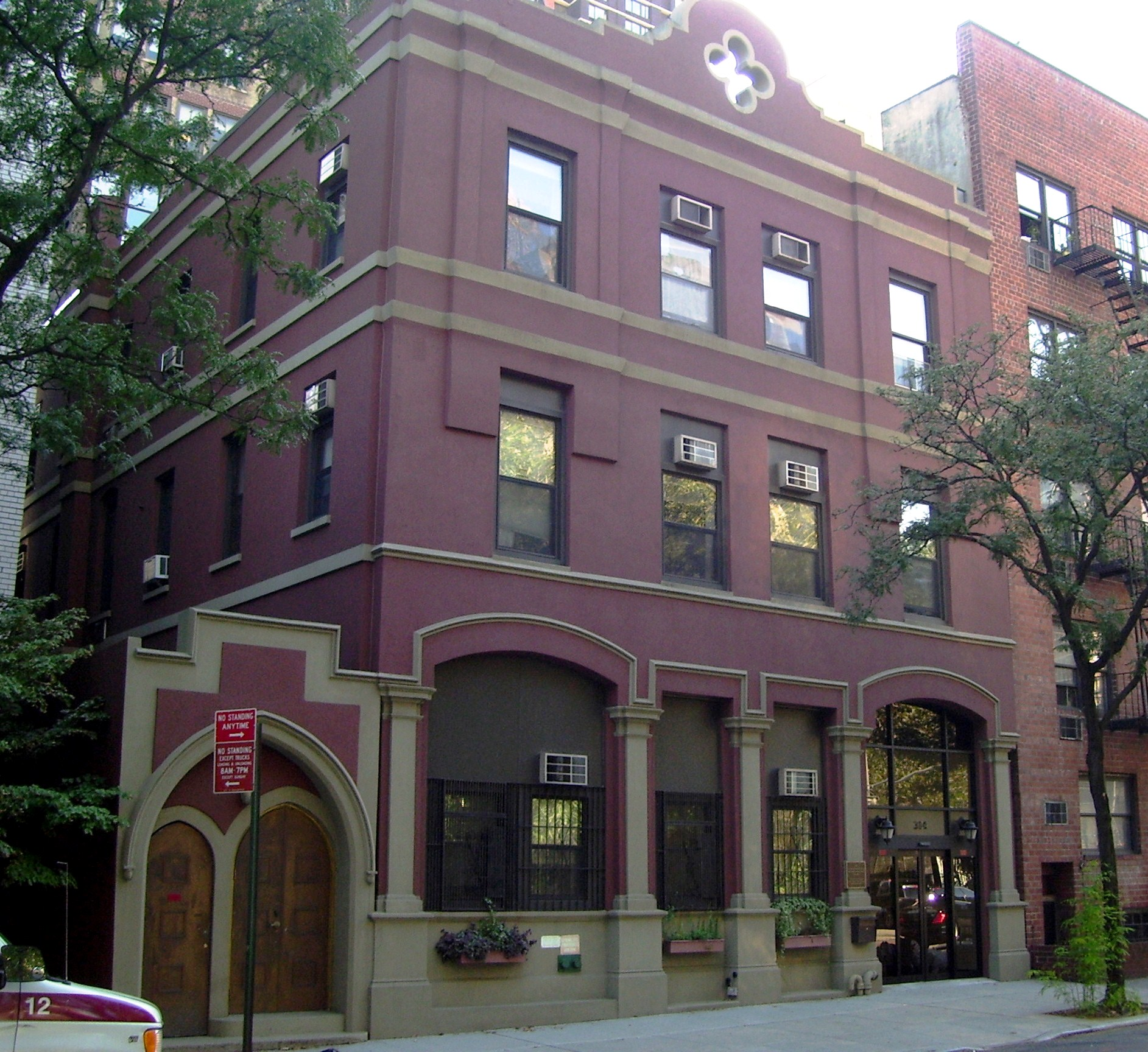
The former Church of St. Gregory the Illuminator in 2012

Preliminary sketches for the design of a cathedral were made by an architects' committee headed by Manoug Exerjian and Zareh Sourian and were also received from other designers overseas. Demolition of the site began in April 1958 and the diocesan offices were temporarily relocated to St. Gregory the Illuminator Church, which was located at 314 East 35th Street on the block adjacent to the construction site. (Note: Prior to 1920, a group of trustees from St. Illuminator's that disagreed with the purchase of a church on East 27th Street had split off and formed another parish that was also named after Saint Gregory the Illuminator and rented space at several locations in Midtown Manhattan before purchasing the building on East 35th Street that was converted into a church; this parish was later absorbed by St. Vartan Cathedral.)

The first building constructed on the site was the diocesan house, which would serve as the offices for the diocese and the residence of the primate. The cornerstone for the new building was blessed and dedicated by Archbishop Sion Manougian on January 24, 1959, following a celebration of the divine liturgy held at St. Gregory the Illuminator Church. The $300,000 brick and stone structure was designed by Zareh Sourian of the architectural firm of Eggers & Higgins. The diocesan house was completed in November 1959. The following year, Vasken I, Supreme Patriarch and Catholicos of All Armenians, held several conferences in the diocesan house's reception room. It was the first visit to the diocese by any head of the Armenian Apostolic Church.

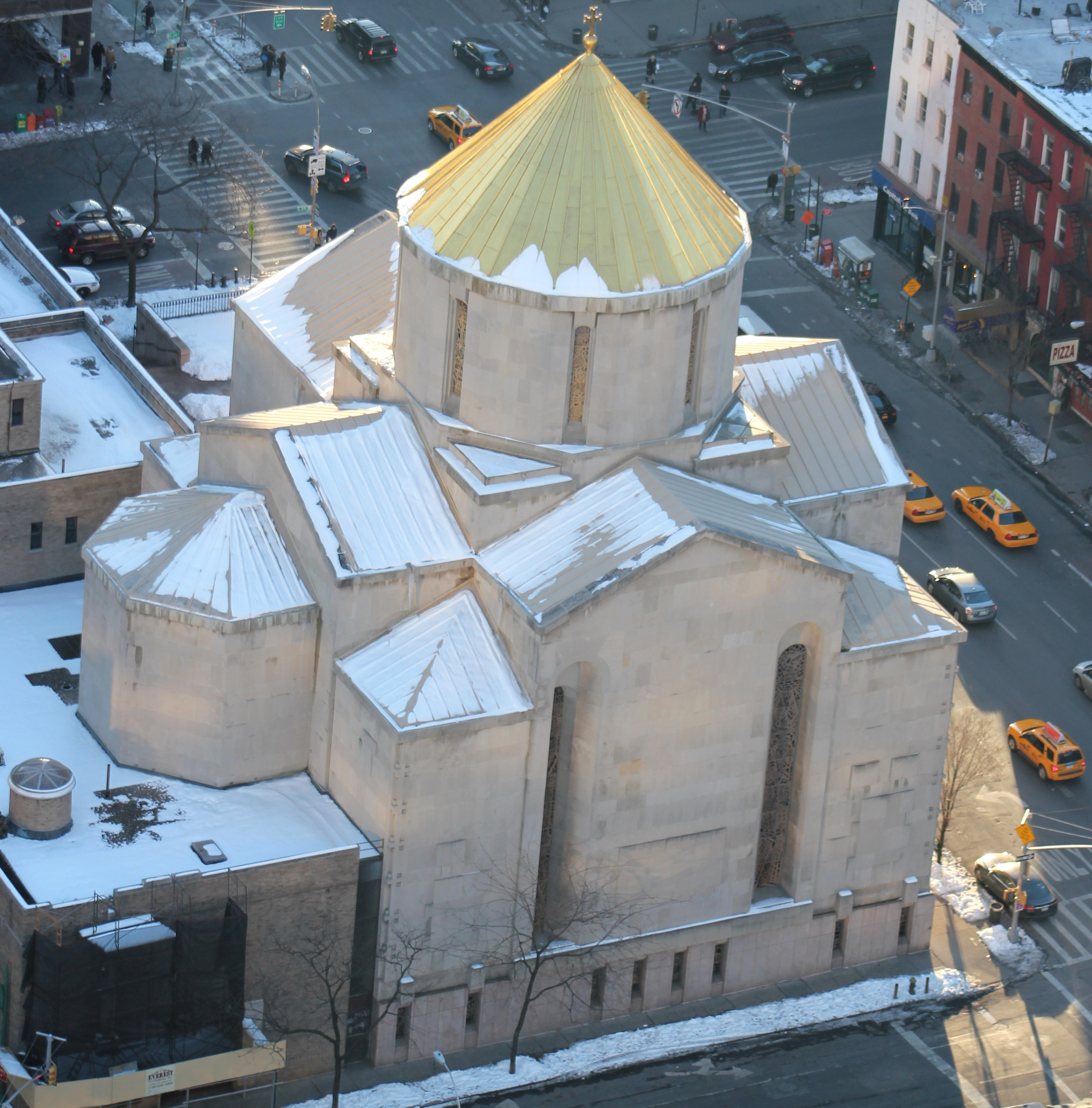
From above (north elevation)

In May 1963, Archbishop Manougian announced that the architectural firm of Steinmann, Cain & White had been retained to design the cathedral and cultural center on the remainder of the site, which occupied a total area of 26,400 square feet (2,450 m^{2}). A groundbreaking ceremony for the cathedral was held on May 2, 1965, and the cornerstone was blessed by Archbishop Torkom Manoogian on October 2, 1966. The three-story Armenian cultural center was dedicated on October 21, 1967. On April 28, 1968, the $3.5 million cathedral was consecrated by Vasken I in the name of St. Vartan.

Beginning in 1973, the cathedral hosted an annual One World Festival to showcase Armenian culture. The event was co-sponsored with the city and ran for 16 years. Six pear trees were planted along Second Avenue on Martyrs' Day in 1976 as a memorial to the Six Provinces lost in the Armenian genocide. In 1978, the public park located on the block on the north side of the site was renamed St. Vartan Park after the cathedral. The park was previously named St. Gabriel's Park after the nearby St. Gabriel Church, but its original namesake had been demolished to make way for the Queens–Midtown Tunnel. The park was also used as a venue for the One World Festival.

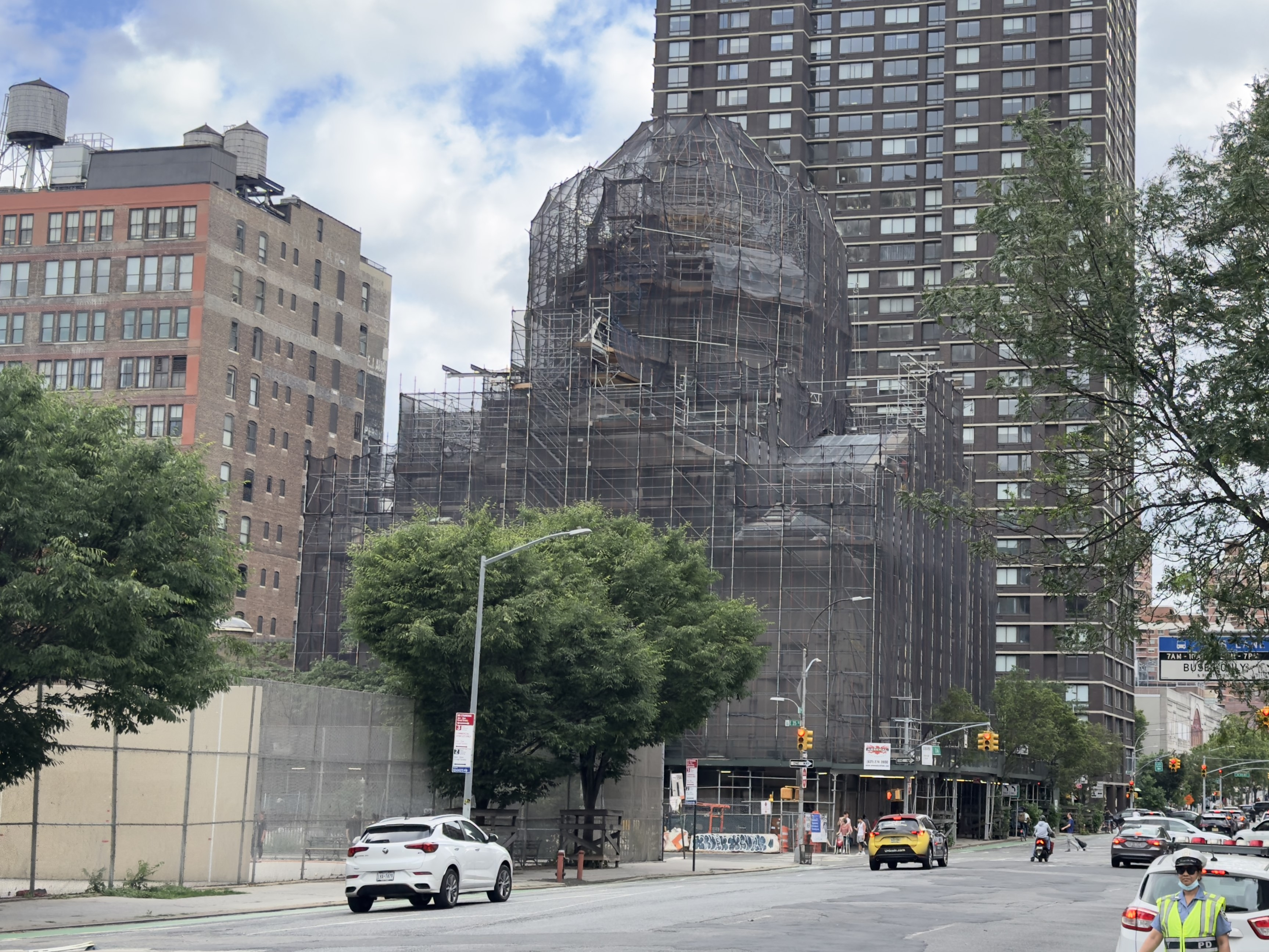
The cathedral under renovation in June 2024

A $2.5 million renovation of the cathedral was completed in 1994, which included cleaning and repointing of the façade, regilding of the dome with 23-karat gold leaf, and the installation of granite blocks in the plaza. As of 2025, the cathedral is undergoing another multi-phase restoration project.

== Architecture ==
Walker O. Cain, of the firm Steinman, Cain & White – successor firm to McKim, Mead and White – was the principal architect of the cathedral. The Armenian Church names Rafayel Israyelian as its architect. Varazdat Harutyunyan wrote that Israyelian provided the "sketch designs" and his design was modified slightly on site. Édouard Utudjian of Paris, who directed the restoration of the Armenian section of the Church of the Holy Sepulchre in Jerusalem, served as the consulting architect as Israyelian could not travel to the U.S.

The building includes two unique features distinct to Armenian architecture: the use of double-intersecting arches and a pyramidal dome soaring 120 feet (37 m) above street level. Churches in Armenia originally doubled as forts and were constructed with thick stone walls; the use of steel in the building's structural system enabled the size of the walls to be reduced from a traditional thickness of two and a half feet (0.76 m) to 1 foot 1 inch (0.33 m).

Interior of the dome

Around the dome there are various symbols, including the figure of Jesus Christ; the Holy Spirit represented by a dove; the Greek letters alpha and omega superimposed on the scriptures; wheat and grapes representing the Eucharist; and the Phoenix symbolizing resurrection etc. A series of high, narrow, stained-glass windows are set into the main walls of the cathedral below the dome depicting scenes in the life of Christ and early Christianity in Armenia. The patron saint of the cathedral, St. Vartan, is depicted fighting the Sassanid Persians who threatened the Armenian Church during the fifth century. Ecumenism is symbolized in the portrait of St. Nerses and the crosses of Christendom.

A 72-by-100-foot (22 by 30 m) plaza, elevated five feet (1.5 m) above the sidewalk level, is located on the south side of the cathedral and bordered on the east by the cultural center and diocesan house. The plaza contains a 10-foot (3.0 m) high Reuben Nakian bronze sculpture, "Descent from the Cross" that was dedicated in 1977 and inspired by the painting The Raising of the Cross as well as a stainless steel and bronze sculpture, "Migrations" by Michael Aram that was added in 2015 to commemorate the centennial of the Armenian genocide. An auditorium with an adjacent kitchen and serving facility is located below the plaza; this space was designed for meetings and parties and is accessed via a separate entrance on Second Avenue that connects to a lower lobby and two large meeting rooms located below the cathedral.
