= The Lion King (disambiguation) =

The Lion King is a 1994 animated Disney film.

The Lion King may also refer to:

- The Lion King (franchise), a media franchise that originated with the film The Lion King
  - The Lion King (1994 soundtrack)
  - The Lion King (video game), a 1994 video game
  - The Lion King (musical), a 1997 Broadway musical
    - The Lion King (original Broadway cast recording), a 1997 album containing a recording of the above musical made by its original Broadway cast
  - The Lion King II: Simba's Pride, a 1998 direct-to-video sequel
  - The Lion King: Simba's Mighty Adventure, a 2000 video game
  - The Lion King 1½, also known as The Lion King 3: Hakuna Matata, a 2004 direct-to-video sequel
  - The Lion King (2019 film), a 2019 photorealistic animated remake
    - The Lion King (2019 soundtrack)
    - The Lion King: The Gift, a secondary soundtrack to the 2019 film, curated by Beyoncé
  - Mufasa: The Lion King, a 2024 photorealistic animated prequel
- MS Rigel III, a ferry known from 1996 to 1998 as the MS Lion King
- Coat of arms of the United Kingdom, shows a Lion crowned and a Unicorn, representing England and Scotland
- Coat of arms of the Netherlands
- Coat of arms of Belgium
- Coat of arms of Luxembourg
- Flag of the Republic of Venice
- Simply Heraldry, which uses elements in which can be considered to be a "Lion King"
- Sher Shah Suri, 16th century Afghan Sultan of India

== See also ==
- King of the Jungle (disambiguation)
