= Jadwin Gymnasium =

Multi-purpose arena at Princeton University

L. Stockwell Jadwin Gymnasium
- Jadwin Jungle
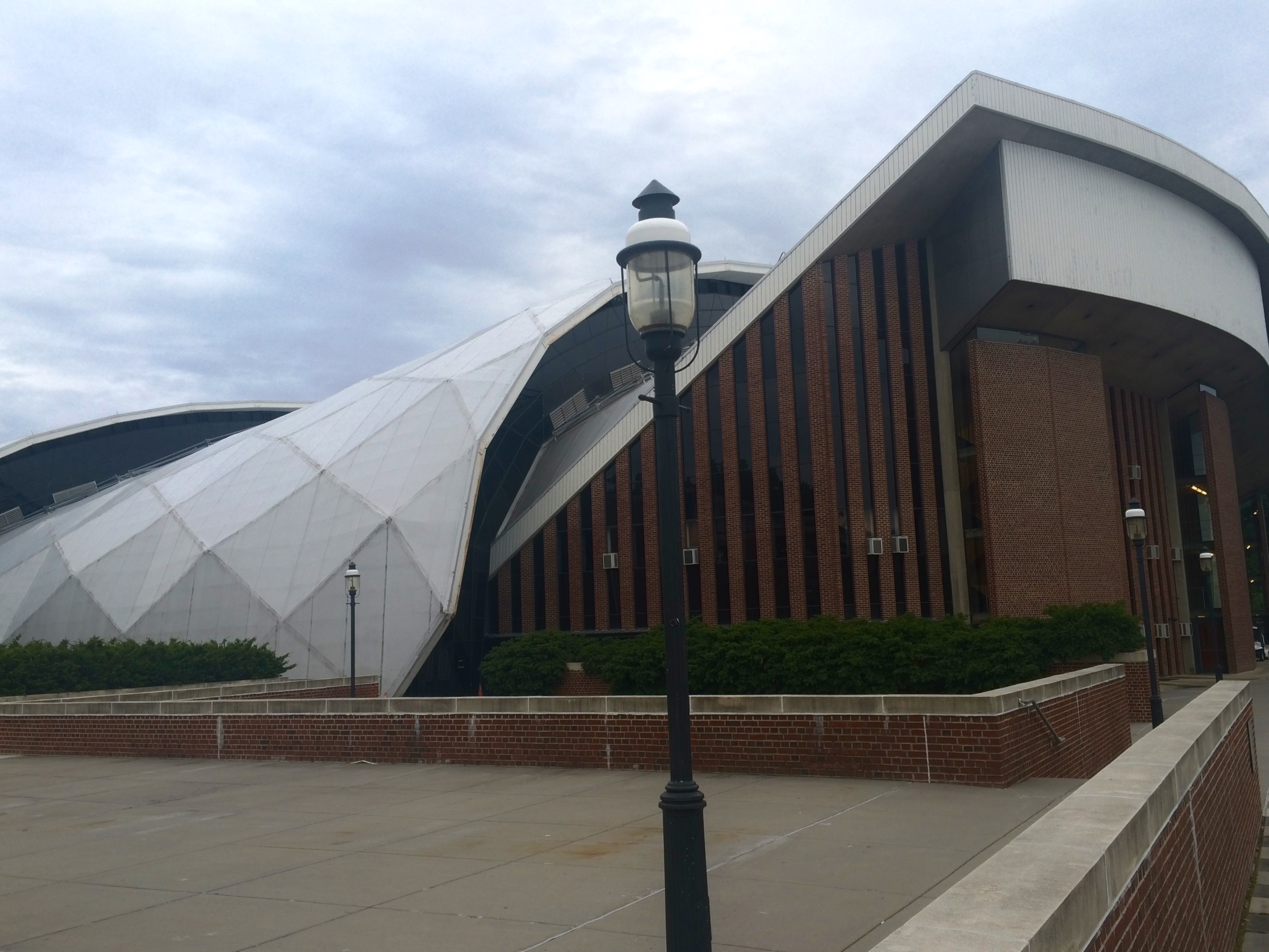
- Interactive map of L. Stockwell Jadwin Gymnasium
- Location: Princeton University; Princeton, NJ 08542
- Coordinates: 40.343449°N 74.648595°W
- Owner: Princeton University
- Operator: Princeton University
- Capacity: 6,854

Construction
- Groundbreaking: 1964
- Opened: 1969
- Cost: $6.5 million
- Architects: Walker O. Cain & Assoc.

Tenants
- Princeton Tigers (Basketball, track, fencing, squash, & tennis)

The L. Stockwell Jadwin Gymnasium is a 6,854-seat multi-purpose arena at Princeton University in Princeton, New Jersey. The arena opened in 1969. It is home to the Princeton Tigers college basketball teams. It replaced Dillon Gymnasium, the home of Princeton volleyball and wrestling, as the fifth main basketball arena on campus.

In 1965, the mother of Leander Stockwell Jadwin, class of 1928, gave a gift of $27 million to the university in his name. He had been the captain of the track team and had died just months after graduation in an automobile accident. The school decided to use $6.5 million towards the building of the gymnasium, which had just barely been started.

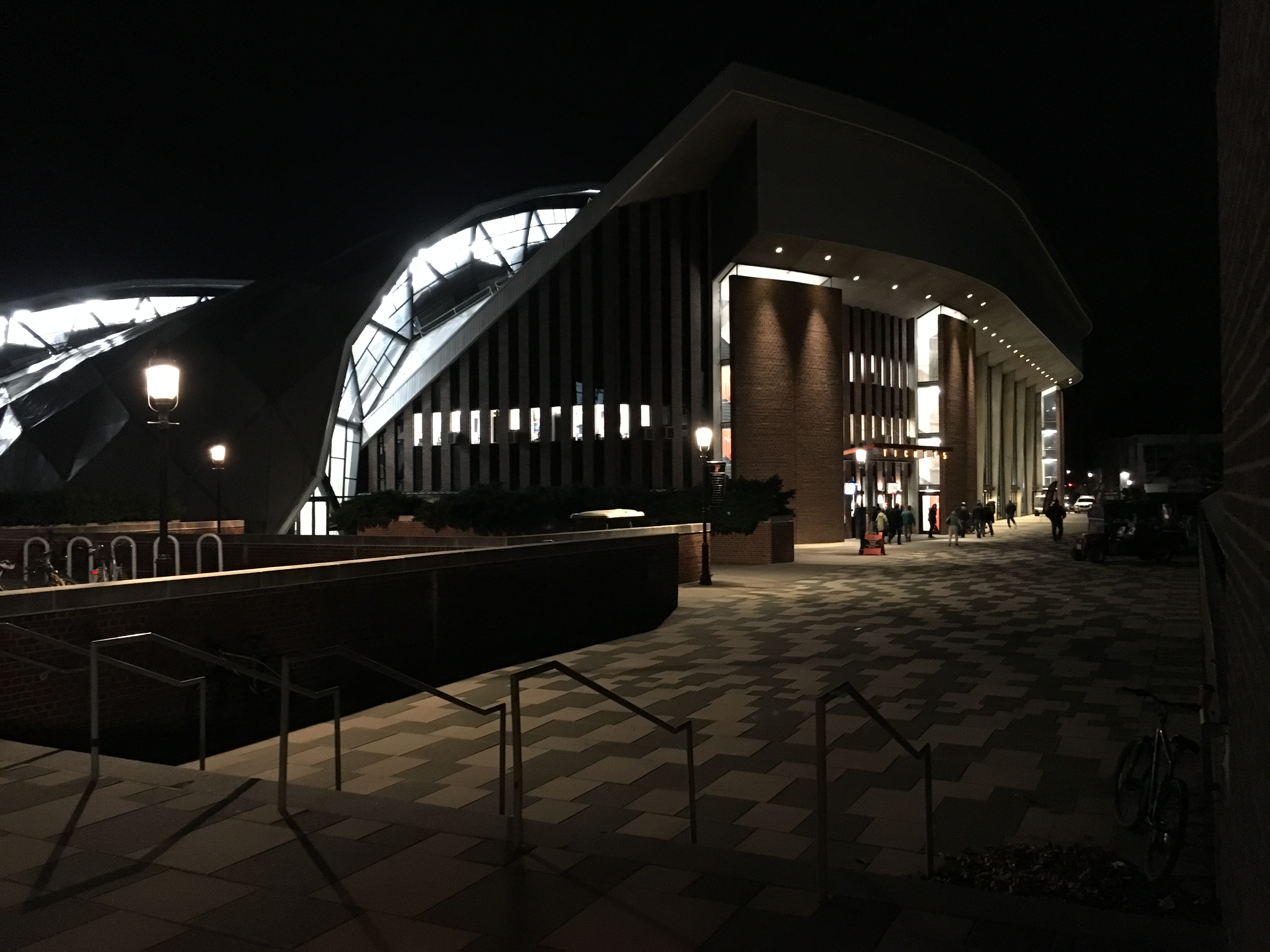
Jadwin Gymnasium at night

The gymnasium, designed by the architect Walker O. Cain, has 250,000 square feet (23,000 m^{2}) of floor space on five levels for multiple sports. It is notable for its unique roof consisting of three interlocking shells. The seating is highly asymmetrical, with bleachers on three sides and a concrete grandstand on the fourth side, holding the majority of the seats. Behind the opposite bleachers lies the void of the indoor track, which itself sits atop an indoor baseball field and three additional levels underneath. This creates challenges for generating noise and atmosphere even when the stands are full compared to other gyms in the Ivy League, which are mostly smaller and more traditional in their layout. The television cameras also are mounted on the large grandstand side, which makes Jadwin seem smaller on television.

Many of the highest attended events in Jadwin were college and high school wrestling tournaments, the 1975 NCAA Wrestling tournament drew a total of 45,000 (then the record) for six sessions, with 9,600 attending the finals. Six years later, Princeton brought in more temporary seating and averaged at least 1,000 more per session. For many years Jadwin Gymnasium was the site of the New Jersey State High School wrestling tournament, with many sessions of 8,000 to 10,000 fans.

Jadwin Gymnasium hosted games of the first round of the NCAA Division I men's basketball tournament twice, in 1970 and 1972. It was the site of the ECAC Metro Region tournament organized by the Eastern College Athletic Conference (ECAC) in 1976. Jadwin hosted the 2023 Ivy League men's and women's basketball tournaments, which were both won by the homestanding Tigers.

The Jadwin Jungle is the official student cheering section and basketball booster group in Jadwin Gymnasium for the Princeton Tigers basketball teams, located in the bleachers closest to the court behind the scorers' tables. The cheering section was founded in 2003 by three Princeton undergraduates and quickly grew to be the largest student group on campus.

The first Princeton Tiger basketball player to score a basket in Jadwin Gym was Geoff Petrie. A Princeton BBall legend and NBA standout, until injuries sidelined his career .

== See also ==
- List of NCAA Division I basketball arenas
