= Hui Lan Zhang =

Yoga teacher

Zhang Huilan
- Born: 1955 (age 70–71); Hong Kong SAR, China
- Other names: Wai Lana; Vaiṣṇava dāsī
- Occupations: Yoga teacher media personality writer
- Years active: Since 1980
- Known for: Wai Lana Yoga and Huilan Yoga (Huilan yujia 蕙兰瑜伽)
- Awards: Padma Shri
- Website: wailana.com

Hui Lan Zhang or Zhang Huilan (simplified Chinese: 张蕙兰; traditional Chinese: 張蕙蘭; pinyin: Zhāng Huìlán) is an internationally recognized yoga teacher, popularly known as Wai Lana in the West. In China, Zhang is called the "mother of yoga" (yujia zhi mu 瑜伽之⺟) in recognition of her significant contributions towards popularizing yoga in the country during the 1980s and 1990s. She is (co)author of numerous works on yoga written in Chinese, most notably Yoga: Qigong and Meditation (Yujia: qigong yu mingxiang 瑜伽——气功与冥想).

== Career ==
Zhang produced her Wai Lana Yoga series for public television in the United States where it has been airing nationwide since 1998 and is still airing today after 28 years—making it the longest-running fitness series ever on public television. (Note: As of 2026, the series has been airing for approximately 28 years since its nationwide debut in 1998.) Wai Lana Yoga has also aired internationally on five continents: North and South America, Asia, Europe, Australia and the Middle East. Earlier, in 1985, China Central Television began broadcast her series Yoga: Exercise Methods for One's Body and Mind (Yujia: ziwo shenxin duanlian fangfa 瑜伽——自我身心锻炼方法).

To help further popularize yoga in the West, Zhang (as Wai Lana) started selling her music CDs, yoga instructional DVDs, and other yoga lifestyle products through different online and offline retail channels. Besides her several books on the practice of Yoga, she has also published two books on cuisine, Wai Lana's Favorite Juices and Wai Lana's Favorite Soups, her Easy Meditation for Everyone Kit, as well as many children's yoga products, including Wai Lana's Little Yogis Daydream Kit, Fun Songs Cartoon & CD, and Little Yogis DVDs & Books.

In 2015, Wai Lana produced her acclaimed Namaste music video to celebrate the first ever International Day of Yoga on June 21. She wrote the Namaste song to communicate the core values of the yoga way of life—universal brotherhood and love. Namaste was presented at the headline event held by the United Nations at their headquarters in New York City and was streamed live to tens of thousands of yoga lovers gathered at Times Square. To date, her Namaste video has been viewed and listened to over 4 million times.

== Personal life ==
Wai Lana is married to Chris Butler (Jagad Guru Siddhaswarupananda Paramahamsa), a disciple of ISKCON founder A. C. Bhaktivedanta Swami Prabhupada, the founder of the Science of Identity Foundation and the spiritual leader of U.S. Representative Tulsi Gabbard.

== Awards ==
In 2016, Wai Lana was honored by the Government of India with the prestigious Padma Shri Award. (Note: The Padma Shri is the fourth-highest civilian award of India, conferred annually by the Government of India for distinguished service in various fields.) for her extraordinary achievements in popularizing yoga globally through her television series, videos, and books. She is only the second Chinese national ever to receive this honor in its 62-year history.

In 2016, to honor the 2nd Annual International Day of Yoga on June 21, Wai Lana released her new Alive Forever short film and music video.

== Selected bibliography ==
- Zhang Hui Lan (1991). Yoga Gifts I (with CD-ROM). ISBN 978-7500929239.
- Bai Zhong Yan, Zhang Hui Lan (2000). Yoga. Qigong and meditation. Gansu's Literature Publishing House. ISBN 978-7802022027.
- Zhang Hui Lan, Bian Zhu (2000). Yoga: Self-mental and physical training methods. People's Sports Publishing. ISBN 978-7500900368.
- Wai Lana (2003). Wai Lana's Favorite Juices. Ten Speed Press. ISBN 978-0-9725618-5-3.
- Wai Lana (September 1, 2004). Little Yogis: Fun Songs Activity Book. Wai Lan Yoga Trust. ISBN 978-1-932493-43-6.
- Wai Lana Yoga (May 1, 2005). Daydream Kit: Wai Lana's Little Yogis. Wai Lana. ISBN 978-1-932493-36-8.
- Wai Lana (January 1, 2006). Daydream Coloring Book. Wai Lan Yoga Trust. ISBN 978-1-932493-26-9.
- Bai Zhong Yan, Zhang Hui Lan (2007). Yoga and Meditation. China Youth Publishing Group. p. 299. ISBN 978-7500932215.
- Jana Gaiten; Wai Lana (2008). Wai Lana's Favorite Soups. National Book Network. ISBN 978-1-932493-50-4.
- Zhang Hui Lan (2012). Pressure relief, Concentration and Meditation. Jiangsu Science and Technology Publisher. p. 214. ISBN 978-7534591815.
- Zhang Hui Lan (2012). Life Style and Natural Healing. Jiangsu Science and Technology Publisher. p. 278. ISBN 978-7534591822.
- Zhang Hui Lan (2012). Basic Poses and Techniques - Huilan Yoga. Jiangsu Science and Technology Publisher. p. 292. ISBN 978-7534592218.

== See also ==
- Wai Lana Yoga
