= Coasts (band) =

English rock band (2011–2019)

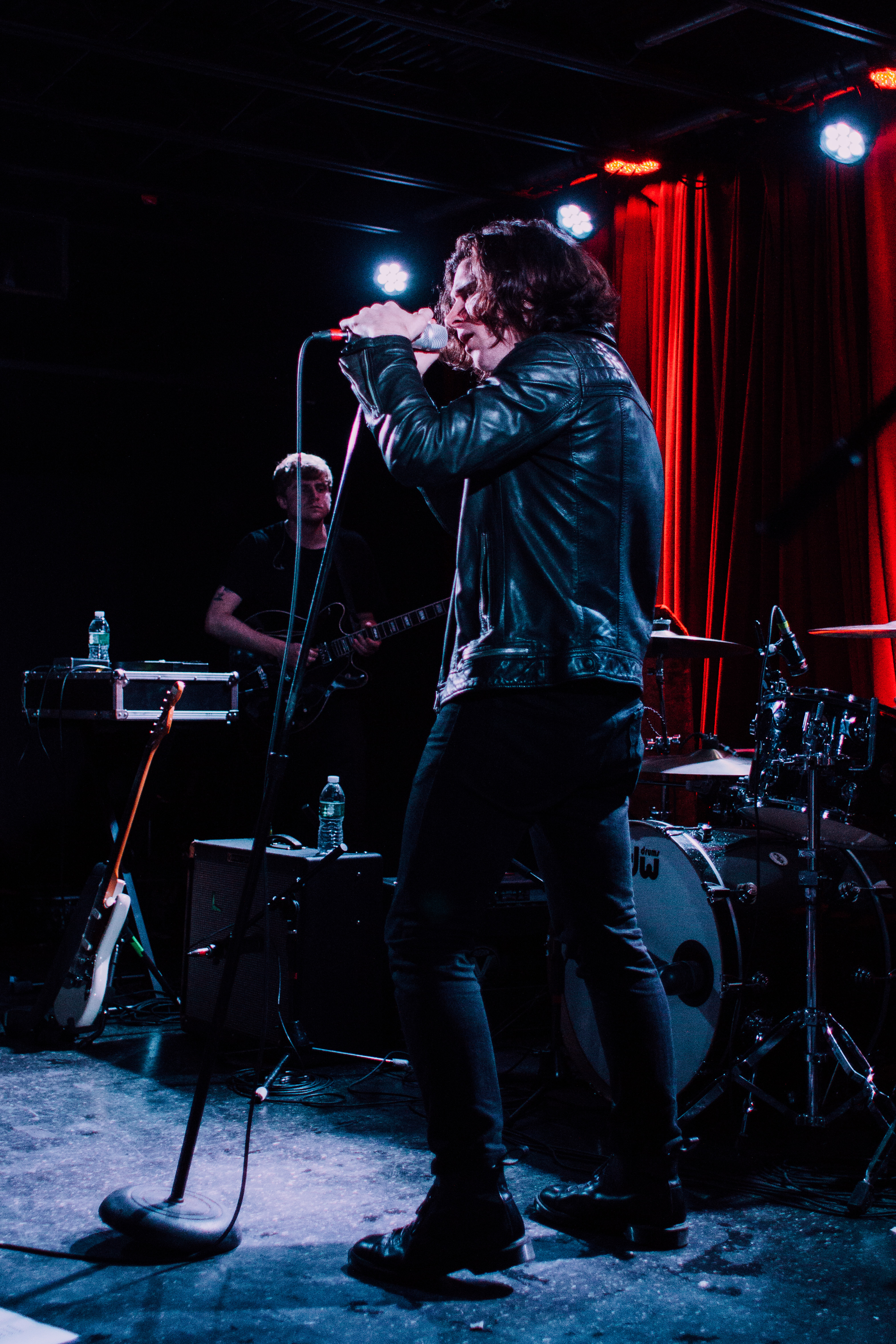
- Coasts, April 2016

Background information
- Origin: Bristol, England
- Genres: Indie pop; alternative rock
- Years active: 2011–2018; 2019
- Labels: Capitol; Warner; High Time
- Past members: Chris Caines; Liam Willford; James Gamage; David Goulbourn; Ben Street
- Website: coastsband.com

Coasts was an English rock band formed in Bristol in 2011. The group consisted of Chris Caines (vocals), Liam Willford (guitar), James Gamage (bass), David Goulbourn (keyboards) and Ben Street (drums). They are most notable for achieving two UK top 40 albums, the second of which reached the top 20. They are also known for their singles "A Rush of Blood" and "Oceans". "A Rush of Blood" was named Zane Lowe's 'Hottest Record' in October 2014. The single has also featured on Made in Chelsea. "Oceans" has received international media attention and has achieved over four million plays on SoundCloud.

Coasts signed a record deal in the United Kingdom with Warner Records and with Capitol Records in the United States, in late 2014.

== History ==
=== Formation ===
The members of Coasts met at university in Bath and then moved to Bristol after they finished, forming the band. They spent the summer writing material and rehearsing in the crypt of a church before making their first live appearances in 2012. In the same year, the band released their debut single, "Stay", which received radio support from Huw Stephens. During this period, the band toured extensively across the UK, with sell out shows including London's Camden Barfly. In 2013 Coasts continued to sell out shows around the UK and in Europe, and made various industry appearances including Brighton's Great Escape Music Festival.

=== 2014 ===
Coasts recorded their third single, "Oceans", with Duncan Mills and released it in June 2014. The single received BBC Radio 1 support from Greg James and Huw Stephens. The band played a Radio 1 live session at Maida Vale for Huw Stephens following on from this as well as performing live at Radio 1’s Big Weekend in Glasgow. The band followed this up with a sold out show at Dingwalls in Camden and were then named as iTunes 'Ones to Watch' in July 2014. The band recorded "A Rush of Blood" with Mike Spencer which became their fourth single. The song was premiered as Zane Lowe's 'Hottest Record' on BBC Radio 1 as well as receiving support from Fearne Cotton, Greg James and Huw Stephens. On the back of this the band embarked upon a UK tour.

In December 2014 the band performed the songs "A Rush of Blood", "Oceans" and "Let Go" live on Series 8, Episode 10 of Made in Chelsea.

=== 2015 ===
The band embarked on a North American tour in early 2015, with their first appearance taking place at El Rey Theater, Los Angeles, California, United States. They have also headlined London's Scala and KOKO. They performed at Californian music festival Coachella in April 2015 and played the Reading and Leeds Festivals in the UK in August 2015. The band also played at a number of major festivals that summer including Glastonbury and Lollapalooza.

=== 2016 ===
Their debut album, Coasts, was released in January 2016. AllMusic noted that album has "a competent collection of catchy arena-ready tunes that could eventually carry them there". The album charted at Number 38 on the UK charts, with the band playing an album release show at Roundhouse in Camden. The band also toured the US and Europe throughout the year in support of the album.

=== 2017 ===
The band released their second album, This Life Vol.1, in August 2017, with the album achieving a chart position in the UK of 17, a new high for the band. A 38-date UK tour coincided with the release of the album, seeing the band play in a number of cities that they had not visited before.

=== 2018 ===
The band embarked on a world tour in 2018 with fellow High Time band, The Hunna. This tour saw the bands travel to Australia, Europe, US and the UK. Coasts followed this up with a sold out tour across the UK, culminating in a show at Kentish Town Forum in London.

On 9 August 2018, Coasts announced via Facebook and Twitter that they will no longer be performing together as a band, naming their upcoming UK tour as their Farewell UK Tour. The band's final show was at Shepherd's Bush Empire on 28 October 2018.

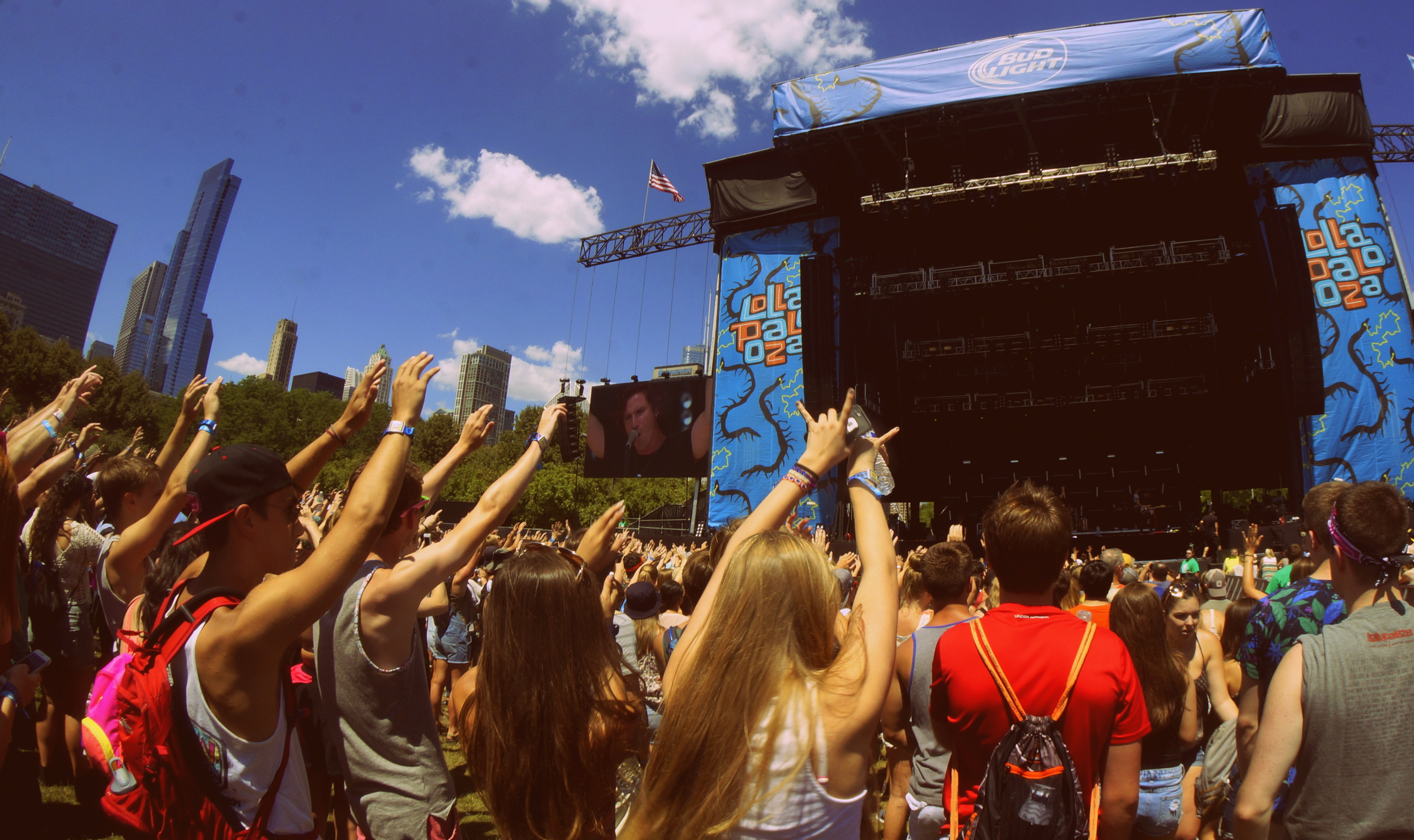
Coasts performing at Lollapalooza

=== 2019 ===
On 12 July 2019, Coasts reunited to headline the Jurassic Fields festival in Bridport, UK.

== Members ==
- Chris Caines — Vocals
- Liam Willford — Guitar
- James Gamage — Bass
- David Goulbourn — Keys
- Ben Street — Drums

== Discography ==
=== Albums ===
Title	Details	Charts (UK)
Coasts	Released: 22 January 2016; Label: Tidal Recordings; Format: Digital download, CD	38
This Life Vol 1	Released: 18 August 2017; Label: High Time; Format: Digital download, CD	17

=== Extended plays ===
Title	Details
Paradise	Released: 2013; Label: Tidal Recordings; Format: Digital download
Oceans	Released: 2014; Label: Warner Music; Format: Digital download
Coasts	Released: 2014; Label: Capitol Records; Format: Digital download
A Rush Of Blood	Released: 2014; Label: Warner Music; Format: Digital download

=== Singles ===
Year	Title	Album
2012	"Stay"	Coasts
2013	"Wallow"	Coasts
2014	"Oceans"	Coasts
2014	"A Rush Of Blood"	Coasts
2015	"Wolves"	Coasts
2015	"Modern Love"	
2018	"First Love"	Non-album single
