= Édouard Utudjian =

French-Armenian architect (1905–1975)

- Born: November 5, 1905 or 12; Constantinople, Ottoman Empire
- Died: July 28, 1975 (aged 69); Paris or Chartres, France
- Occupation: Architect

Édouard Utudjian (born Yervant; November 5, 1905 – July 28, 1975) was a French-Armenian urban planner and architect. He is recognized as a pioneering figure and leading theorist of underground urbanism.

== Biography ==
Utudjian received his secondary education at Robert College and Saint-Grégoire College in Istanbul, where he became a French-speaking baccalaureate graduate. He immigrated to France in December 1925 and enrolled at the École nationale supérieure des beaux-arts in June 1926. He advanced to first class in 1929 and completed his architectural studies in March 1931. He obtained his diploma in February 1941 from the Pontremoli and Leconte studio for his project on the Development of Saint-Lazare Island in Venice, home to an Armenian Catholic congregation. During this period, he also pursued additional training at a School of Advanced Commercial and Financial Studies and a School of Civil Engineering in Paris.

Parallel to his architectural education, Utudjian enrolled at the Institut d'Urbanisme de l'Université de Paris (IUUP) in 1933, successfully completing two years of study by 1935. However, he did not defend his thesis until 1951, when he presented "Urbanisme souterrain" (Underground Urbanism) under the supervision of Pierre Lavedan, the historian of urbanism and then-director of the IUUP.

== Career ==
=== Underground urbanism ===
Utudjian's most significant contribution was the conceptualization and development of underground urbanism as a distinct field. In 1933, he founded the Groupe d'Études et de Coordination de l'Urbanisme Souterrain (GECUS - Study and Coordination Group for Underground Urbanism), which he led until his death. His work was motivated by what he described as the ills and chaos afflicting large cities, which he believed necessitated the rational use of underground space. He published extensively on the subject, including influential works such as L'urbanisme souterrain (1952) and L'architecture et l'urbanisme souterrain (1966) and created and edited the journal Le Monde souterrain (The Underground World), which was compiled into a ten-volume encyclopedia.

Utudjian believed that underground urbanism must not lead to the construction of "real cavern cities" intended for permanent habitation. He argued that underground habitat must be temporary and very limited because "human nature is made for a given atmospheric environment and science does not currently allow for the integral reconstitution of this environment underground".

Utudjian served as secretary general of the Comité Permanent International des Techniques et de l'Urbanisme Souterrain (CPITUS - International Standing Committee for Underground Techniques and Urbanism). Through GECUS, he contributed to major underground infrastructure projects including the Channel Tunnel, the Paris Réseau Express Régional regional rail network, Les Halles, and metro systems in Iran and Spain.

Utudjian taught at several institutions, including École spéciale d'architecture (1950 to at least 1967), École nationale et spéciale des Beaux-Arts (1952 through at least 1967), École spéciale de mécanique et d'électricité, and Conservatoire national des Arts et Métiers.

=== Architectural practice ===
Beginning in 1929, Utudjian established his architectural practice in Paris, operating primarily from the 9th arrondissement between 1935 and 1967. He worked in partnership with his younger brother, Martin Utudjian (1911–1996), a civil engineer.

Utudjian maintained an active architectural practice with diverse project types. He designed numerous wastewater treatment plants (Achères, Bordeaux, Rouen, Cholet, Athis-Val, Calais), hospitals (Magny-en-Vexin, Winburn Foundation in Bièvres), public buildings including school complexes (Magny-en-Vexin, Port-Marly) and a covered market in Châtellerault, public housing projects (Poitiers, Châtellerault), and reconstruction projects including La Roche-Guyon and the Plombières casino.

Utudjian developed an expertise in the restoration and construction of Armenian churches, working on projects across multiple countries. These included the restoration of Etchmiadzin Cathedral in Armenia, St. James Church in Jerusalem's Armenian Quarter, the Armenian section of the Holy Sepulchre in Jerusalem, and participation in building the Saint Vartan Armenian Cathedral in New York, as well as Armenian cathedrals in Detroit and Geneva. In addition to his urban planning work, Utudjian published Les monuments arméniens du 4e au 17e siècle in 1967, demonstrating his continued connection to his Armenian heritage. It was translated into English in 1968 under the title Armenian architecture, 4th to 17th century. He frequently visited Soviet Armenia.

== Honors ==
- Honorary Fellowship of the American Institute of Architects (1970)
- Légion d'honneur
