= Science of Identity Foundation =

New religious movement based in Hawaii

- Abbreviation: SIF
- Founder: Chris Butler (aka Siddhaswarupananda Paramahamsa)
- Founded at: Hawaii, United States
- Type: Religious organization; 501(c)(3) organization
- Tax ID no.: 99-0177647
- Purpose: Education, philanthropy, religious studies, spirituality
- Headquarters: Honolulu, Hawaii, United States
- Region served: Worldwide
- Services: Yoga classes
- Website: scienceofidentity.org
- Formerly called: Hari Nama Society; Holy Name Society

The Science of Identity Foundation (SIF) is a new religious movement started in the 1970s. It was founded by Chris Butler after he broke from the International Society for Krishna Consciousness. It is based in the U.S. state of Hawaii.

SIF professes a Gaudiya Vaishnava theology. As directed by Butler, the followers must observe behavioral guidelines, such as vegetarianism and refraining from alcohol. Butler's teachings also include Islamophobia and condemnation of homosexuality. Since 2019, the secretive group has come under a great deal of media focus due to the politician Tulsi Gabbard's ties to the group.

== History ==
Chris Butler (b. 1948), son of an anti-war activist, became involved with the 1960s counterculture while enrolled at the University of Hawaiʻi. Soon, he joined the burgeoning Hare Krishna movement as a guru, with the name Sai Young, and gained some disciples. Butler joined the International Society for Krishna Consciousness (ISKCON) and received the name Siddhaswarupananda Paramahamsa. Within a few years, Butler began to deviate from ISKCON's ways, choosing to marry and allowing his disciples to keep their heads unshaved, leading ISKCON founder A. C. Bhaktivedanta Swami Prabhupada to publicly denounce him. After the death of Prabhupada in 1977, Butler broke away from ISKCON and founded SIF, then known as the Hari Nama (lit. Holy Name) Society. Simultaneously, he began to deemphasize ISKCON's rigid adherence to Vaishnava texts and promoted a range of eclectic views.

In 1976, Butler's disciples launched a new political party, the Independents for Godly Government, presenting themselves as a "multifaith coalition of conservative-minded reformers", and ran candidates for Hawaiʻi's House of Representatives and mayoral elections; the candidates did not disclose their links with Butler and explicitly claimed to have no affiliation with any religious organization including the Hare Krishna faith. The party was funded by a variety of businesses, including two local newspapers and a health-food store chain, run by the disciples themselves.

In the 1980s, he ran a late-night television show called Chris Butler Speaks on Channel 13. Since the 1990s, Butler has kept a low profile, rarely speaking in public; in 2017, The New Yorker reported that Butler presents himself less as a Hare Krishna dissident and more as a member of a worldwide Vaishnava movement. Butler's wife Wai Lana has received acclaim for popularizing yoga through the Wai Lana Yoga show. Together with Butler, she also did much to popularize yoga in the People's Republic of China. In 2016, she was conferred with the Padma Shri award by the Government of India.

== Theology ==
The SIF derives its theology through its earlier affiliation with ISKCON, which is Gaudiya Vaishnava.The followers should practice vegetarianism and refrain from gambling, smoking, drinking alcohol, taking drugs or having "illicit sex". While the theological basis of Gaudiya Vaishnavism comes primarily from the ancient Indian texts, Bhagavad Gita and Bhagavata Purana, Butler deemphasized the Indian texts, and in 1984 published "Who Are You? Discovering Your Real Identity", which used some examples from science to argue against materialism and assert the eternal nature of the self.

Butler's teachings included condemnation of homosexuality, suspicion of Islam, Islamophobia, and skepticism of science. In the 1980s, Butler opposed bisexual relations, asserting that these would lead to pedophilia and bestiality. SIF has been considered a secretive organization that disavows its views on homophobia and Islamophobia.

Multiple ex-members of SIF have described it as a cult; Butler's status has been characterized as "akin to a god" and not willing to be questioned. They say Butler regularly mocked his devotees, publicly, calling it "a form of Krishna's mercy". Butler denies these allegations; and he threatened to sue the Honolulu Star-Advertiser when it planned to publish accounts of ex-followers in 2019.

== Association with Tulsi Gabbard ==
Since 2019, SIF has received a great deal of media coverage due to Tulsi Gabbard's strong ties with the group. Gabbard was raised in the SIF community in Hawaii and considered Butler her mentor. Her parents, Mike Gabbard and Carol Gabbard, are members of SIF. In 2015, she acknowledged Butler as her guru in a video statement for an ISKCON anniversary event. Butler has likened her to a star pupil. Gabbard has worked to minimize and hide her relationship to Butler and SIF. A lengthy investigative piece published in The Washington Post on June 21, 2026, indicates the connections were much deeper than had previously been thought.

== See also ==
- Qnet
