= Lion (name) =

Lion as a name may refer to:

== Surname ==
- Alfred Lion (1909–1987), German-American record producer
- Joel Lion (born 1964), Israeli diplomat
- Margo Lion (1944–2020), American theatrical producer
- Moshe Lion (born 1961), Israeli politician
- P. Lion (born 1959), Italian singer

== Given name ==
- Lion Feuchtwanger (1884–1958), German novelist
- Lion Philips (1794-1866), Dutch merchant
- Lion van Minden (1880–1944), Dutch fencer killed in Auschwitz

== Fictional characters ==
- Jeremy Lion, comedic character created by Justin Edwards
- Lion, cat from Fireman Sam
- Lion El'Jonson, primarch of the Dark Angels legion from Warhammer 40000 universe
- Lion Rafale, from video game Virtua Fighter Series
- Lion Ushiromiya, from the Japanese sound novel Umineko no Naku Koro ni

== See also ==
- Lions (surname)
- Lyon (disambiguation), people with the surname Lyon
