= Coasts (album) =

Studio album by Coasts
- Released: 22 January 2016
- Genre: Indie Pop
- Length: 59:49
- Label: Capitol

Singles from Coasts
- 1. "A Rush of Blood" Released: 1 May 2015; 2. "Oceans" Released: 1 July 2015; 3. "You" Released: 25 November 2015

Professional ratings
Aggregate scores
Source	Rating
Metacritic	59/100
Review scores
Source	Rating
AllMusic	3/5 stars
The Guardian	2/5 stars

Coasts is the debut studio album by English band Coasts. It was released in January 2016 under Capitol Records. The album charted at No. 38 on the UK Official Charts.

== Track listing ==
No.	Title	Writer(s)	Producer(s)	Length
1.	"Oceans"	Christopher Caines; Liam Willford	Duncan Mills; Mark Crew^{[b]}	3:43
2.	"Wolves"	Caines; Willford; Fraser Thornycroft-Smith	Fraser T Smith	3:26
3.	"You"	Caines; Willford; Thornycroft-Smith	Smith	3:05
4.	"Modern Love"	Caines; Willford; Thornycroft-Smith	Mike Spencer	3:56
5.	"Lions"	Caines; Willford; Eliot James	James; James Rushent^{[b]}	2:52
6.	"Stay"	Caines; Willford	Braque; Crew	3:02
7.	"A Rush of Blood"	Caines; Willford; James; James Rushent	Spencer	4:07
8.	"Your Soul"	Caines; Willford	Mills; Rushent^{[b]}	3:23
9.	"Wash Away"	Caines; Willford	James; Rushent^{[b]}	4:22
10.	"Tonight"	Caines; Willford; James	Braque; Crew; Rushent^{[b]}	4:07

Deluxe edition bonus tracks
No.	Title	Writer(s)	Producer(s)	Length
11.	"Wallow"	Caines; Willford	Mills; Rushent^{[b]}	4:58
12.	"Let Go"	Caines; Willford; James	James; Rushent^{[b]}	3:30
13.	"Golden City"	Caines; Willford; James	James; Rushent^{[b]}	3:11
14.	"As Long as I Need You"	Caines; Willford; James	James; Rushent^{[b]}	3:45
15.	"See How"	Caines; Willford	James; Rushent^{[b]}	3:33
16.	"Stone"	Caines; Willford; James	James; Rushent^{[b]}	4:49

== Reception ==
AllMusic noted that the album has "a competent collection of catchy arena-ready tunes that could eventually carry them there".
