= Local Investing Opportunity Network =

LION: Local investors supporting community

A Local Investing Opportunity Network, (LION), is an American investment club that operates as a loosely organized group of people who meet regularly with the goal of investing money in their local community. The group will generally consist of individuals who have money to invest and people who might be in a position where they would be seeking investors. The LION is designed to create opportunities for local businesses, individuals, and local investors to network and develop informal relationships.

The U.S. Securities and Exchange Commission has created some very specific laws about how one can ask for money. These laws limit any kind of public offerings of shares/interest in a company (i.e. securities), unless there are proper filings and the people investing are considered accredited investors. There is a general exemption that the SEC does not regulate where the investors are friends with the people they are investing in. The LION hosts informal gatherings with the idea that friendships would form and the SEC guidelines would not be violated when any investments occur. The LION also documents who attends the gatherings as a means of creating a paper trail proving that the individuals involved in an investment had the opportunity to form an informal relationship.

The LION does not facilitate any dealings, nor does it allow businesses to make pitches soliciting investments to the group. All investments that might occur as a result of the LION meetings would occur outside of a LION meeting and be wholly arranged by the individuals involved in that business dealing.

== History ==
The first Local Investing Opportunity Network was formed in Port Townsend, Washington as part of the Transition Towns movement.

They have since been launched in many other areas including New York, New York, Portland, Oregon, Humboldt County, California, Ithaca, New York, Berkshire County, Massachusetts and Columbia County, New York, and Lake County, California.
