= The Lion (locomotive) =

Historic locomotive in Maine, United States

- U.S. National Register of Historic Places
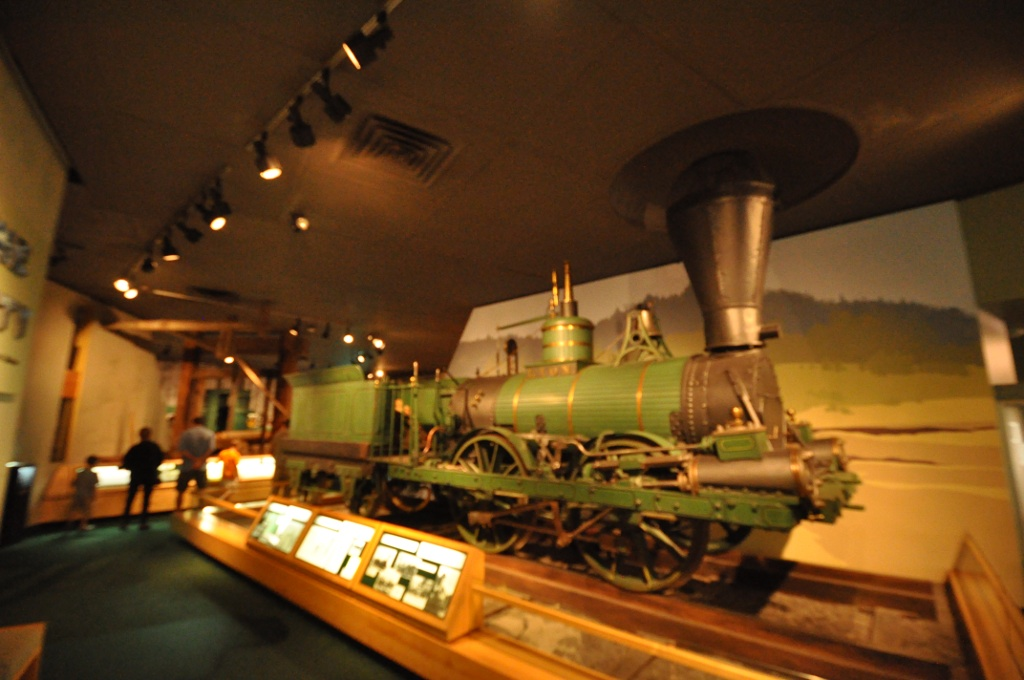
- The Lion in the Maine State Museum, Augusta, Maine, July 2013

- Location within Maine Location within the United States
- Location: Maine State Museum, Augusta, Maine
- Coordinates: 44°18′22″N 69°46′57″W
- Area: 0.5 acres (0.20 ha)
- Built: 1846
- Architect: Hinkley & Drury
- NRHP reference No.: 76000118
- Added to NRHP: December 15, 1976

The Lion is a historic steam locomotive at the Maine State Museum in Augusta, Maine, USA. Built in 1846 for use on a logging railroad, it is the oldest known American-built locomotive in New England. It was listed on the National Register of Historic Places in 1976.

== Description ==
The Lion is set on display, prominently located near the entrance to the Maine State Museum. Its main frame is 12 feet 5 inches (3.78 m) long and 7 feet 4.5 inches (2.248 m) wide, made of solid oak timbers with iron strapping. Mounted on this frame is a five-section boiler, with a dry steam dome near its center from which steam is piped to the steam chest and then to the pistons. The boiler and cylinders were insulated with a thin layer of wood, which was covered by a thin layer of iron. The main stack is located at the front and has an unusual inverted cone shape, intended to deflect sparks and cinders from the exhaust.

It has been stated that the Lion cost originally $2,700, exclusive of the tender. The bore and stroke of its cylinders are 9 1/2 and 17 in (240 and 430 mm) respectively, with the four driving wheels being 42 1/2 in (1.08 m). The locomotive alone weighs 9 short tons (8.2 t; 8.0 long tons).

== History ==
The locomotive was built by Hinkley & Drury (Hinkley Locomotive Works) in 1846 as the Lion for the Machiasport Railroad of eastern Maine. The Lion operated as a working locomotive until 1890. It was sold in 1897 to Thoman Towle of Portland, Maine. It was then purchased by the City of Portland and appeared in the 1898 Fourth of July parade. The Lion was given to the University of Maine at Machias in 1905 and was displayed and owned by the University until 1985 when it was given to the Maine State Museum. It was added to the National Register of Historic Places in 1976. The Lion is the oldest American-built locomotive in New England.

== See also ==
- National Register of Historic Places listings in Kennebec County, Maine
