= The Lion, Potters Bar =

Former pub in Potters Bar, Hertfordshire, England

Coordinates: 51.6921°N 0.1785°W

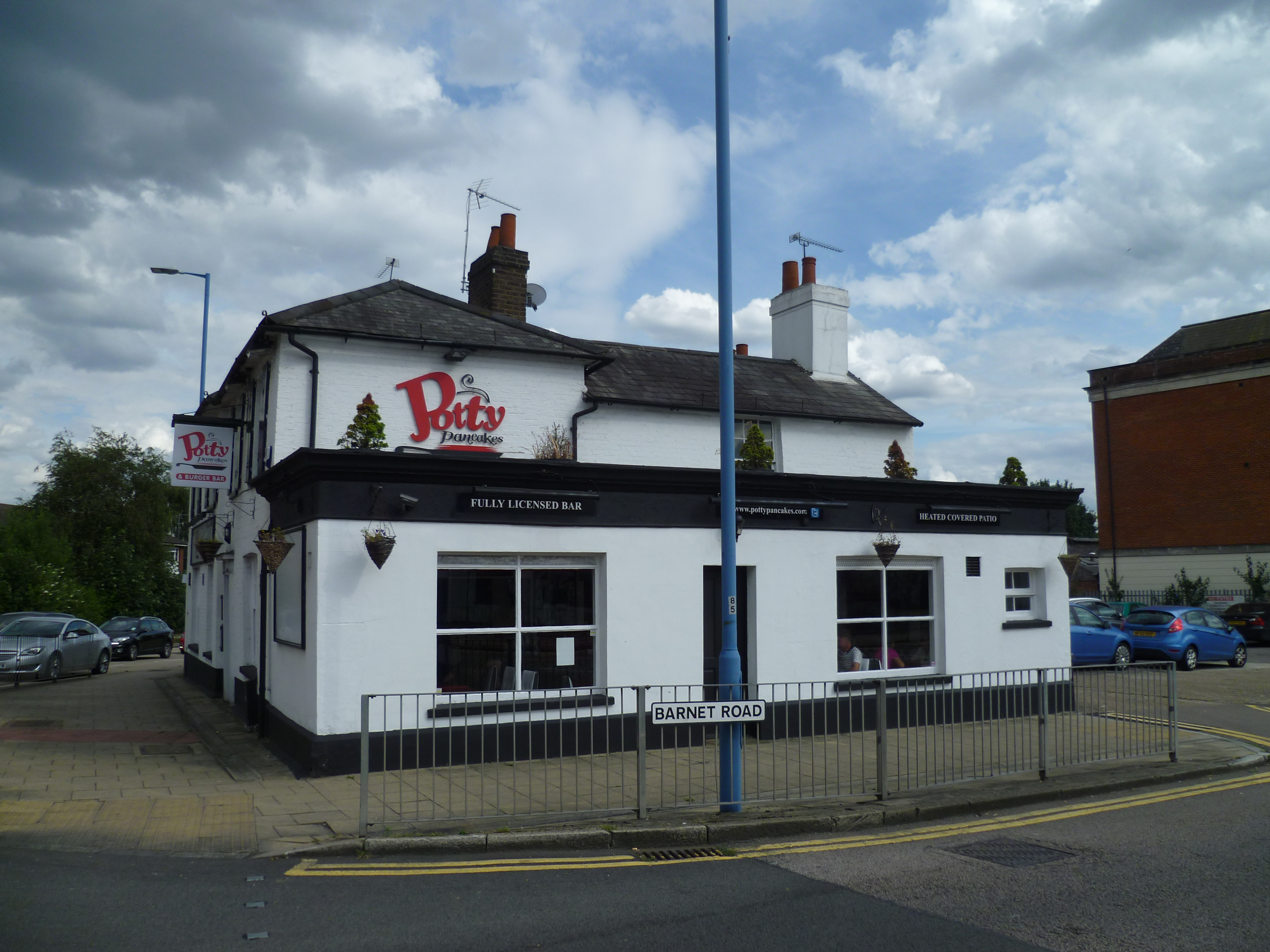
Potty Pancakes, formerly The Lion public house.

The Lion is a former public house on the corner of Barnet Road and Southgate Road in Potters Bar, Hertfordshire, England, and a grade II listed building with Historic England. It became Potty Pancakes some time after 2008.
