= SS Lion =

Canadian steamship in Newfoundland and Labrador

History
- Name: Lion
- Owner: John Reddick
- Operator: Walter Grieve & Co
- Launched: Greenspond, Bonavista Bay, Newfoundland
- Completed: 1866
- In service: 1867
- Out of service: 6 January 1882
- Identification: Official Number 052320
- Fate: Lost

General characteristics
- Tonnage: 393 GRT; 292 NRT
- Length: 140 ft (43 m)
- Beam: 28 ft (8.5 m)
- Depth: 16 ft (4.9 m)
- Decks: 2
- Installed power: Sail/steam output: 75 hp (56 kW)
- Crew: 10

SS Lion was the first wooden-wall steamship in Newfoundland and Labrador, constructed in 1866. The ship's main purpose was to head back and forth within the sealing industry from the ice off Labrador to St. John's, Newfoundland. On January 6, 1882, the vessel was lost in the night while transporting goods and persons from St. John's to Trinity, Newfoundland. All people on board lost their lives.

== Description ==
Lion was a full-rigged steamship measured at 292 net register tons (NRT). The vessel's steam engines produced 75 nominal horsepower. The vessel was owned by Walter Grieve and Co.

== Service history ==
Lion was one of the first wooden-wall steamships operating off Newfoundland, entering service in 1867. Lion was used to sail from the sealing grounds off Labrador and St. John's, Newfoundland. Due to the ship's owners anti-Confederation views, the vessel flew a blue ensign with large white letters that read "No Confederation." In 1871, Lion brought home the crew of SS Wolf after that ship had been cut in two by an iceberg in Green Bay, Newfoundland.

=== Fate ===
On January 6, 1882, the ship left St. John's to prepare for the upcoming seal hunt. Under the command of Captain Patrick Fowlow of Trinity, Newfoundland, the ship started to make its way to Trinity. Carrying passengers and a load of coal, the ship was soon lost in the middle of the night, near Baccalieu Tickle, despite fair weather conditions. Most believe the ship exploded due to insufficient water in the boilers. The loss claimed the lives of all passengers, crew and captain. All that was found was a small amount of debris and the body of a young woman from St. John's.
