= Lion Brewery =

Lion Brewery or Lion Breweries may refer to:

== Australia ==
- Lion Brewing and Malting Company of Adelaide, South Australia, now defunct
- Lion Brewery, Townsville, a heritage-listed building in Queensland, Australia

== New Zealand ==
- Lion Breweries, a brewery company from New Zealand now trading as Lion Nathan

== Sri Lanka ==
- Lion Brewery (Sri Lanka) or Lion Brewery (Ceylon) PLC, a brewery in Sri Lanka

== United Kingdom ==
- Lion Brewery, Oxford, a former brewery and current residential site in Oxford, England
- Lion Brewery Co, a brewery in Lambeth, London
- Camerons Brewery, a brewery in West Hartlepool
- Lion Brewery, Blackburn, England, owned by Matthew Brown brewery from 1927 until its closure in 1991

== United States ==
- Lion Brewery, Inc., a brewery in Pennsylvania
- Lion Brewery (formerly Costanz Brewery), a defunct brewery in New York

== See also ==
- Mohan Meakin Brewery, an Asian brewing group of companies who make Lion Beer
