= Wai Lana Yoga =

Instructional yoga television series

Wai Lana Yoga is an instructional yoga television series that has been airing on public television stations nationwide since 1998. It is distributed by American Public Television.

== Host ==
It is hosted by Wai Lana, who was interviewed on Inside Edition on 8 May 2007. She has also produced a musical cartoon.

Her "Namaste" music video was played in the United Nations in 2015 to celebrate International Yoga Day.

Her real name is Hui Lan Zhang or Zhang Hui Lan and she is one of only two Chinese nationals to win the Padma Shri Award, which she got in 2016.

Wai Lana is married to Chris Butler, founder of Science of Identity Foundation, who is the spiritual leader of Tulsi Gabbard.

== Episodes ==
It includes seven seasons of twenty-six episodes for a total of 182.

=== Season 1 ===
- 101 Anyone Can Do It
- 102 Arch and Relax
- 103 Upside Down & Rock'n Roll
- 104 Back and Forth and Roar
- 105 Alternate Nostril Breathing
- 106 Cats and Fish
- 107 Balance Your Buttocks
- 108 Stretch Those Strings
- 109 Neti (Sinus and Nasal Cleaning)
- 110 Sooth Your Nerves
- 111 Dive In!
- 112 Energy Charge Breathing
- 113 The King of Asanas
- 114 Rock & Roll
- 115 The Crunch Alternative
- 116 The Lion
- 117 Striking Cobra and Headstand
- 118 Snap, Crackle & Pop
- 119 Plough In and Breathe!
- 120 Ben, Twist and Balance
- 121 Expand The Chest and Breathe
- 122 Bend You Backbone
- 123 Bend, Twist and Release Tension
- 124 Yoga Basics
- 125 The Queen of Asanas
- 126 Let's Tone Up!

=== Season 2 ===
- 201 Tension Spots
- 202 Leg Work
- 203 Get a Head Start
- 204 Hamstrings
- 205 Body, Mind, and Breath
- 206 Healthy Joints for a Healthy Body
- 207 Salute to the Sun (Part 1)
- 208 Salute to the Sun (Part 2)
- 209 Salute to the Sun (Part 3)
- 210 Salute to the Sun (Part 4)
- 211 Release, Arch, and Stretch
- 212 Stretch, Tone, and Salute
- 213 Stretch Your Back
- 214 Abs-Strengthening Leg Exercises
- 215 Salute to the Sun
- 216 Keep Your Balance!
- 217 Abs and Thighs
- 218 Sit a While
- 219 Breathe Away Your Stress
- 220 Do It All!
- 221 Tone Your Back
- 222 Stiff Knees and Tight Shoulders?
- 223 Reach for the Sky
- 224 Complete Yoga Breathing
- 225 Netia Cleansing Technique
- 226 Spinal Fluidity

=== Season 3 ===
- 301 A Healthy Appetite
- 302 Strong as a Tree, Lithe as a Snake
- 303 Stiffness Be Gone!
- 304 Stretch Out Stubborn Knots
- 305 Easy Stretches for Everyone
- 306 Loosen Your Legs for Lotus
- 307 Balance with Poise
- 308 Special: Preventing Back Problems
- 309 Cat Stretching
- 310 Juice Up Your Innards
- 311 Shoulder Stuff
- 312 Legs, Legs, Legs
- 313 Close Your Nose
- 314 Tight Shoulders, Tight Neck
- 315 No More Headaches
- 316 The Importance of Breath
- 317 Ketchari Mudra
- 318 Steady Now!
- 319 Variations on the Classics
- 320 Cooling Breath
- 321 Stretch Your Legs
- 322 Yoga at the Office
- 323 Terrific Triangle
- 324 Energize!
- 325 Get the Kinks Out
- 326 Soothing Twist

=== Season 4 ===
- 401 Bye Bye Bulges
- 402 Yoga Glow
- 403 Stand Tall
- 404 Chin Lock
- 405 Lift and Tone
- 406 Yoga for Vitality
- 407 Back Relief
- 408 Shake A Leg
- 409 Royal Flush
- 410 Breath Is The Key
- 411 Nerves Frayed
- 412 Cradle Rock
- 413 Sports Protection
- 414 Terrific Triangle Twist
- 415 Tummy Tighteners
- 416 Stick 'em Up!
- 417 Rise and Shine!
- 418 Agnisar Kriya
- 419 Pain in the Neck?
- 420 Shrug Off Shoulder Tension
- 421 Torso Twist Toes Touch
- 422 Legs Up!
- 423 Cut Abs with Scissors
- 424 The Sacrum Rock
- 425 Cannonball
- 426 Side-Lying Stretch

=== Season 5 ===
- 501 Tip-Top Trio
- 502 Ungirdle Your Shoulders
- 503 Special: Constipation Begone!
- 504 Good Vibrations
- 505 Breathe Easy!
- 506 Get The Edge with Yoga
- 507 Focus: Arms and Legs
- 508 Energize Your Spine!
- 509 Two-Hand Snake
- 510 Banish Lower Back Pain
- 511 Enjoy Supple Joints
- 512 Easy Stress Relief
- 513 Loose Legs, Loose Hips
- 514 Chakra Breathing
- 515 Duck Walking
- 516 Bellows Breath
- 517 The Thigh Bone's Connected to the Hip Bone
- 518 Special: Pregnancy - Part 1
- 519 Special: Pregnancy - Part 2
- 520 Special: Pregnancy - Part 3
- 521 Special: Recovery from Childbirth - Part 1
- 522 Special: Recovery from Childbirth - Part 2
- 523 Upside Down Flow
- 524 Crane Balance
- 525 Exercise Your Eyes
- 526 Spinal Spiral

=== Season 6 ===
- 601 Lengthen & Strengthen
- 602 Shake Your Legs
- 603 Easy Plough
- 604 Stay Cool
- 605 Yoga Dance
- 606 Twisting Cobra
- 607 Strength & Balance
- 608 Tadagi Mudra
- 609 Better Backs
- 610 Exhilaration!
- 611 Breathe and Meditate
- 612 Galloping Horse, Arching Tiger
- 613 Arch & Bend
- 614 Flex Your Feet
- 615 Plough Twist
- 616 Bow Your Back
- 617 Hamstring Balance
- 618 Ab-Sense
- 619 Energize with the Sun
- 620 Shoulderstand Fun
- 621 Lizard, Locust, & Flapping Fish
- 622 Renew Your Energy
- 623 Forward Folds
- 624 Rocking Bow
- 625 Hold Your Toes!
- 626 Seven-Stage Spinal Stretch

=== Season 7 ===
- 701 Crane Poses
- 702 Lower Back Special (Part 1)
- 703 Lower Back Special (Part 2)
- 704 Un-Knot Your Neck
- 705 Lean On It! (Part 1)
- 706 Lean On It! (Part 2)
- 707 Dynamic Combo Rolls
- 708 Ease Into It!
- 709 Perfect Posture
- 710 Threaded Twist
- 711 Special: High Blood Pressure
- 712 Lengthen Your Legs
- 713 Special: Chair Poses
- 714 Stand Strong
- 715 Butterfly Shoulderstand
- 716 Backbend Boons
- 717 Lunge!
- 718 Animal Poses
- 719 Special: Hemorrhoids
- 720 Lotus
- 721 Toes & Palms Balance
- 722 Special: Blankets
- 723 Perfect Partners
- 724 Lord of the Dance
- 725 Topsy Turvy
- 726 Supply Sides
