= King of the Jungle =

King of the Jungle may also refer to:

== Media ==
- King of the Jungle (TV series), an American reality show
- King of the Jungle (Indonesian TV series), an Indonesian television adventure series broadcast by Trans TV
- King of the Jungle (serial), a lost 1927 film serial
- King of the Jungle (2000 film), a film starring John Leguizamo
- King of the Jungle (1933 film), a film starring Buster Crabbe
- "King of the Jungle" (song), a song by Bananarama from the 1984 self-titled album
- King of the Jungle (company) a British video-game developer; see Agent Armstrong
- "King of the Jungle", an episode of Jungle Jam and Friends: The Radio Show!
- "King of the Jungle", an episode of The King is Dead
- King of the Jungle records, a record label run by DJ Dextrous and Rude Boy Keith

== People ==
- Mark Henry, professional wrestler with the nickname of "The King of the Jungle"

== See also ==
- Jungle King
