= Maine State Museum =

Museum in Augusta, Maine, US

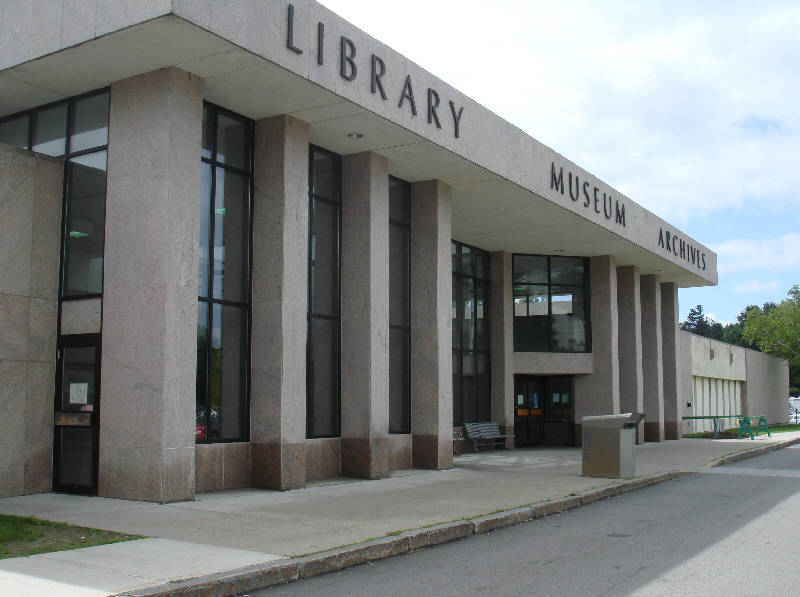
- The Maine State Museum shares a building next to the capitol building with the State Library and the State Archives.
- Established: 1971
- Location: 230 State Street; Augusta, Maine
- Coordinates: 44°18′21″N 69°46′58″W
- Type: History, natural history
- Website: mainestatemuseum.org

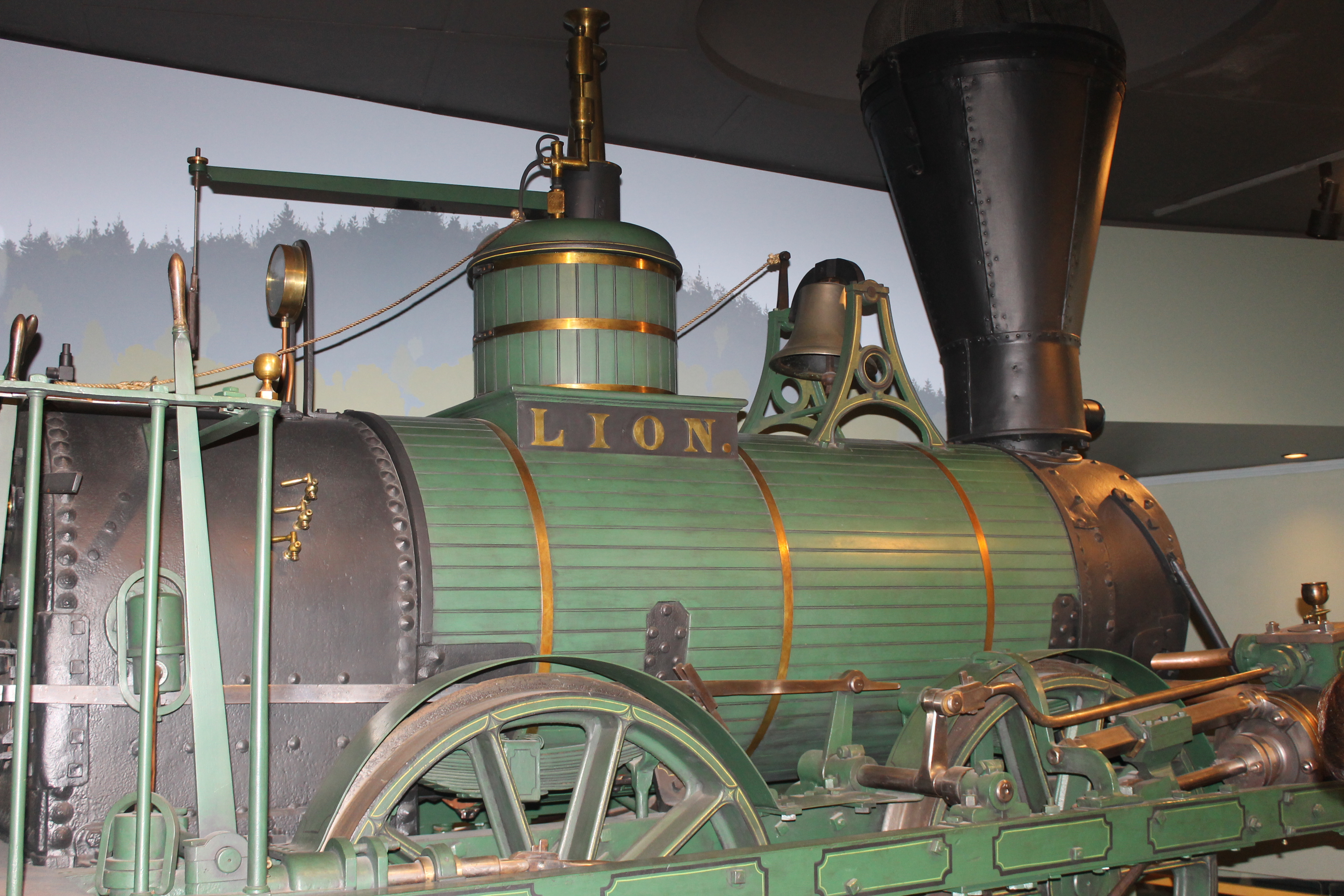
The Lion steam locomotive display at the Maine State Museum in Augusta

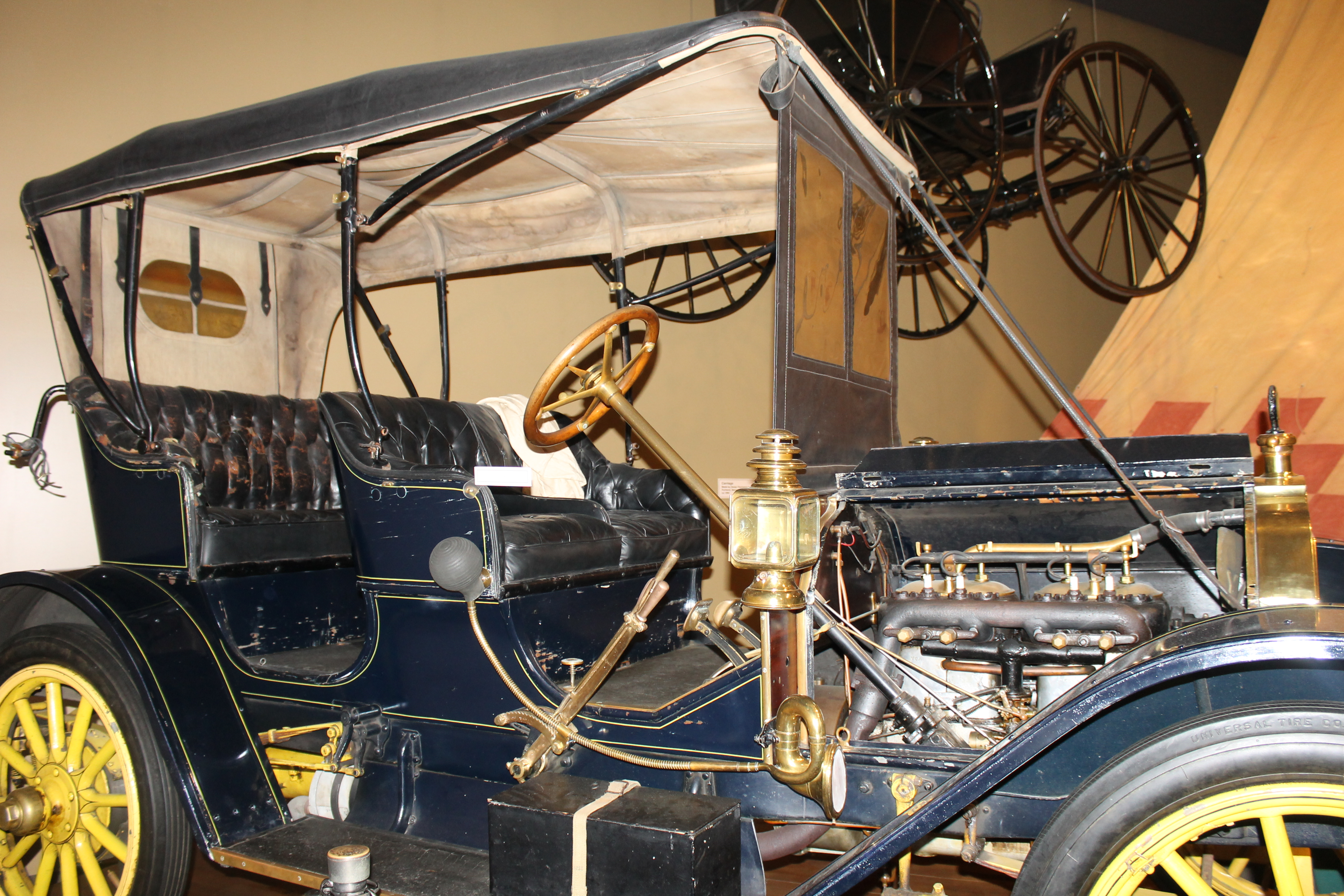
Burrowes Model E. Tourabout (1908) by the E. T. Burrowes Company of Portland, Maine; displayed at state museum in Augusta

The Maine State Museum is the official Maine government's museum and is located at 230 State Street, adjacent to the Maine State House, in Augusta. Its collections focus on the state's pre-history, history, and natural science.

Permanent exhibits include dioramas of Maine's animals, birds and plants in different ecosystems; gems and minerals; displays about the state's natural resources and industries, including forestry, granite, fishing, and agriculture; Clovis culture and archaeological artifacts; and settlement and state history. There is also a working three-story water-powered woodworking mill, and craftsmen's work areas.

The current director of the Museum is Bernard Fishman.

== Labor history mural controversy ==
In January 2013, the Museum agreed to display the controversial labor mural removed from the Maine Department of Labor's lobby by Governor Paul LePage in 2011. Fishman had approached the Department of Labor about displaying the mural after its own search for a location on its property was not successful. A spokeswoman for the Department of Labor stated that the new location would have better security and more viewership. The governor and the artist, Judy Taylor, approved of the new location.

The agreement between the Department of Labor and the Museum provides for a three-year, renewable loan. The department retains ownership of the mural, as transferring ownership would require federal approval because federal money was used to finance it. The Museum hopes to make the mural a part of its collection.
