= Lions (surname) =

Lions is a family name. Notable people with the family name include:

- Jacques-Louis Lions (1928–2001), French mathematician
- John Lions (1937–1998), Australian computer scientist
- Pierre-Louis Lions (born 1956), French mathematician

== See also ==
- Lion (name)
- Lyons (surname)
