= Uhniv =

City in Lviv Oblast, Ukraine

Uhniv Угнів Uhnów
- City
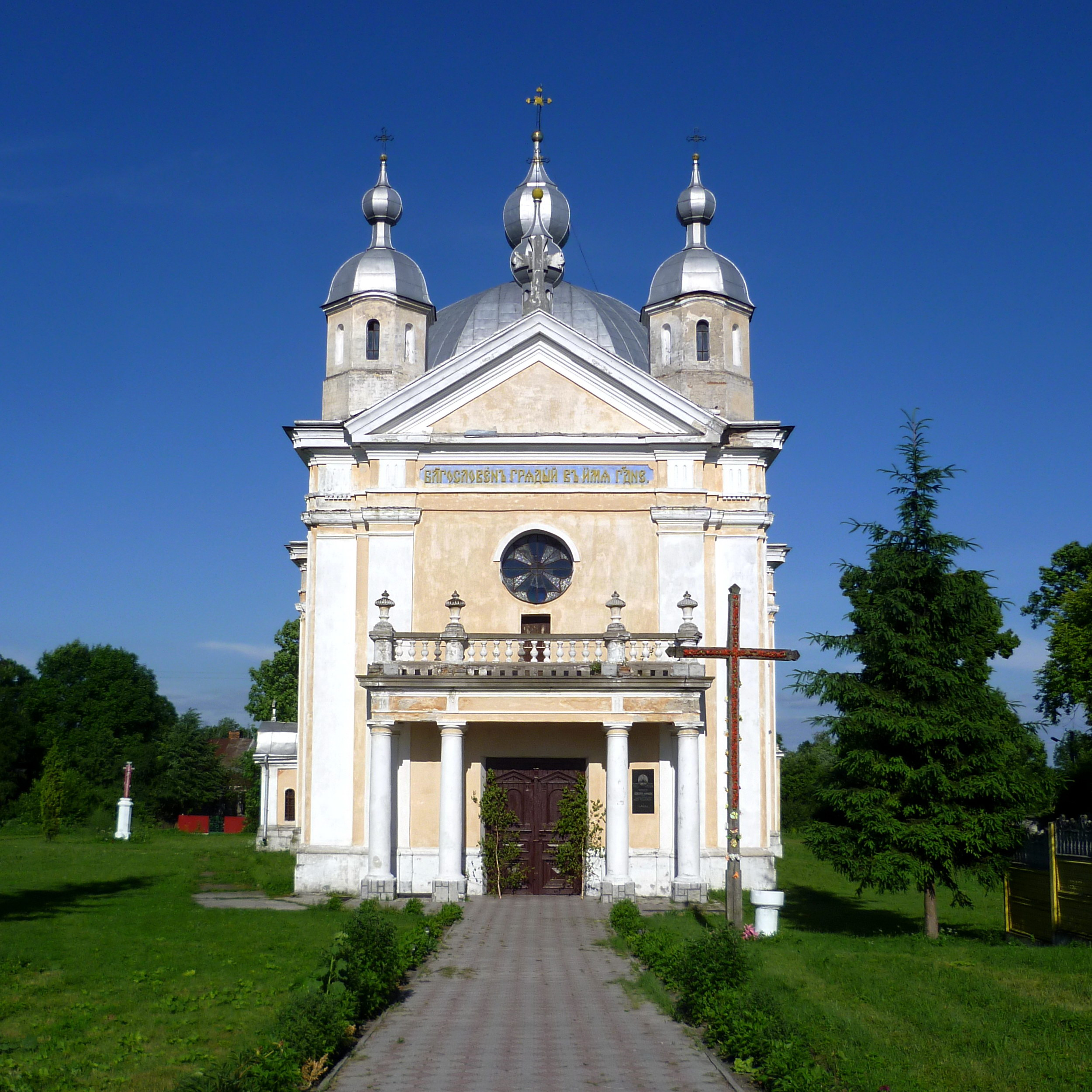
- Church of Nativity of the Virgin Mary

- Coat of arms

- Location within Lviv Oblast Location within Ukraine
- Coordinates: 50°22′00″N 23°44′40″E
- Country: Ukraine
- Oblast: Lviv Oblast
- Raion: Sheptytskyi Raion
- Hromada: Belz urban hromada
- First written mention: 1360
- Magdeburg rights: 1462

Population (2022)
  - Total: 939
  - Estimate (2024): 881

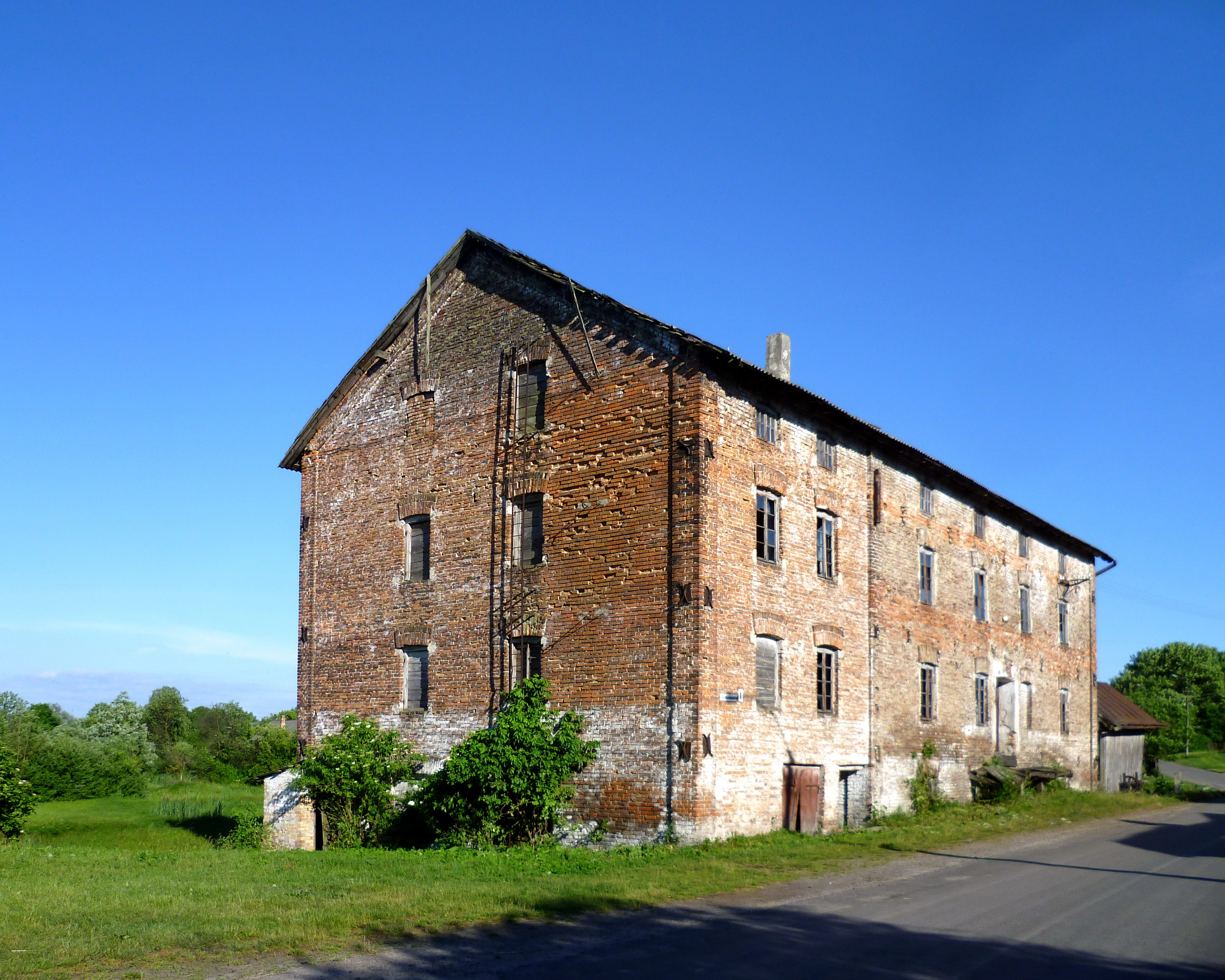
Old water mill

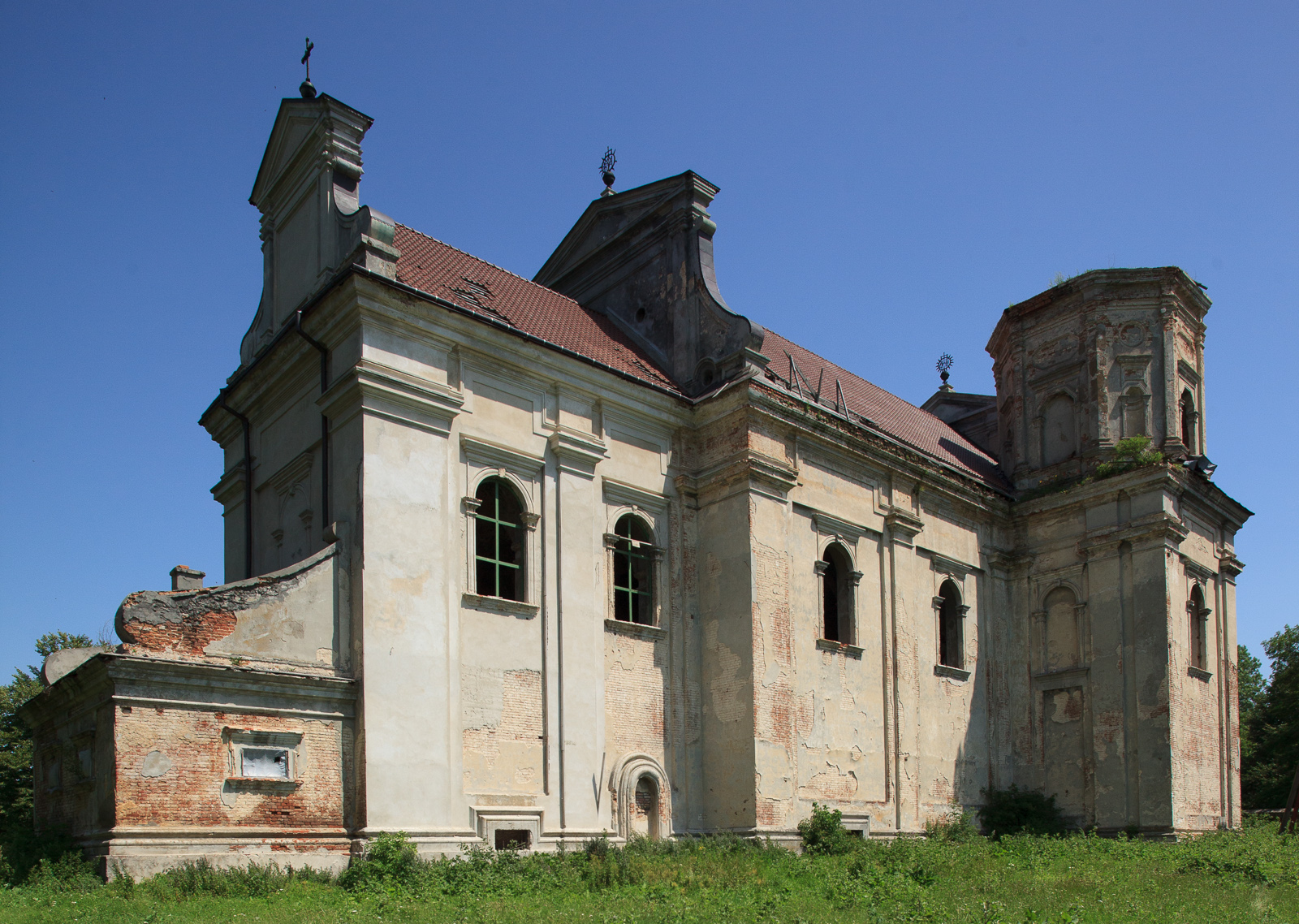
Ruins of Dormition Church

Uhniv (Ukrainian: Угнів [ˈuɦn⁽ʲ⁾iu̯]) is a city in Sheptytskyi Raion, Lviv Oblast, western Ukraine. It has a population of 939 as of 2022.

Uhniv is the smallest city of Ukraine. (Note: Excluding Chernobyl and Pripyat, which were, as the result of the Chernobyl disaster, partially and fully abandoned respectively, but have not lost their city status.) It is located 22 kilometres (14 mi) from Belz and 21 kilometres (13 mi) from Rava-Ruska. It is located next to the Poland–Ukraine border. Uhniv belongs to Belz urban hromada, one of the hromadas of Ukraine. It was passed to Ukraine from Poland as a result of the 1951 Polish–Soviet territorial exchange.

== Name ==
Names of Uhniv in other languages are:

- Polish: Uhnów;
- Yiddish: הובנוב, romanized: Hubnub;
- Russian: Угнев, romanized: Ugnev.

In addition to the official and common name Uhniv, the city was also known as Hovniv, Hivnev, Hivniv, Univ, and Unov.

== History ==
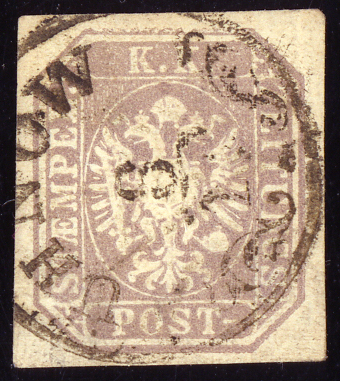
Austria KK Stamp for Newspaper, issue 1863, cancelled UHNOW, Galicia

At the end of the 2nd century AD the Goths invaded Galicia. They conquered the Uhniv area and settled there. At the end of the 4th century, the Huns conquered and replaced the Goths. In the middle of the 5th century, the Slovenes took control of the area. In 1019 the area was conquered by Polish Crown; until 1462 the area was under ducal control. In that year, Belz was established as a capital of voivodeship (pol. województwo) under Polish rule - this district included the town that was later called Uhniv. The settlements in the Belz area belonged to various owners; some to the kingdom (these were called crown cities) and some individuals called squires. In that year (1462) King Casimir IV Jagiellon gave town privileges and the name Uhnów (Uhniv) to the place, so the village became an independent town, free of wider supervision. The inhabitants were not under the squires control but under the king's rule.

In 1477 several villages were included in the general area of Uhniv, This area was extended in 1595. In 1914 there were more than 20 villages surrounding the town of Uhniv.

In 1497 the crusaders came to the district to help the Polish king against Turkish invaders. In 1548-9 the Tatars invaded; from 1648 to 1655 the area suffered from the Cossack uprising under Bohdan Khmelnytsky, hetman of the Zaporozhian who joined forces with the Tartars against Poland. In the following years many wars took place there.

From the first partition of Poland in 1772 until 1918, the town (named UHNOW) was part of the Austrian monarchy (Austria side after the compromise of 1867), in the Rawa ruska (Rava-Ruska) district, in Austrian Galicia province (Crown land). The fate of this province was then disputed between Poland and Ukraine, until the Peace of Riga in 1921.

A post-office was opened in 1857. The Onyshkevych family supposedly had its origins in Uhniv, and many Onyshkevychs were born in this city. For instance, Rev. Stepan Onyshkevych, a Deputy in the Imperial Council of Austria, member of the Ukrainian National Democratic Alliance, and friend of Mykhailo Hrushevsky and Ivan Franko, was born here in 1861. Myroslav Onyshkevych, a colonel in the Ukrainian Insurgent Army and commandant of UPA forces in Military District-6 "San", was born here in 1911, and a dedication to him and his brother Taras Onyshkevych (also born in Uhniv, 1914) was created in 2000, on the house where both brothers were born. After World War II, along with the 1951 Polish–Soviet territorial exchange, the Soviet Union took control of the area.

Until 18 July 2020, Uhniv belonged to Sokal Raion. The raion was abolished in July 2020 as part of the administrative reform of Ukraine, which reduced the number of raions of Lviv Oblast to seven. The area of Sokal Raion was merged into Chervonohrad Raion.

== Jews of Uhniv ==
The Jewish community of Uhnów (Uhniv) goes back very far. There is little historical evidence of this since. The place is too small to be mentioned in Jewish or other records. But thanks to famous rabbis who are mentioned in various sources because of their importance, it is clear that a Jewish community existed there for at least 350 years and even had a rabbinical court and Judge.

In 1629, there were 30 Jewish families, and in 1648–9, 100 families.

Rabbi Shmuel Feivish, son of Rabbi Nathan Feitel, wrote in 1658, in his description of the Khmelnytsky massacres called Tit ha-Yaven:

Plaque dedicated to murdered Jews of Uhniv at the Chamber of the Holocaust on Mount Zion, Jerusalem

"From there the enemy went to Magerov where there were about 100 families who escaped to Narol (mentioned before). From there the enemy went to Potelych - also about 100 families - who escaped to Narol. The enemy went to Rava-Ruska which had 100 families and they also ran away to Narol... In Narol there were 600 householders, not counting refugees; altogether more than 5000 families. As a result of our many sins, a terrible decree was issued and more than 10,000 people were killed, including woman and children. From there, the enemy advanced to Belz which had about 200 families. In addition, Belz had more than 10,000 families who escaped from other towns because Belz was a very strong city. But some died of hunger. From there the enemy went to Uhnów (Hivniv) which had 100 families - they all were killed by their enemies. From there the enemy went to Tishevitz which had 100 families and killed most of them. The enemy went to Sokal which had 100 families who had behind a very thick wall which was built like a fortress and so were saved". The Jewish community was rebuilt by Jews from the surrounding area. After calm restored, they came out of hiding, built new homes, and lived there until the Holocaust. The Jews of Uhniv were murdered in a mass execution on the outskirts of the town on the fifth day of Hanukkah, December 28, 1943.
