= Jewish community of Przedecz =

Coordinates: 52°20′N 18°54′E

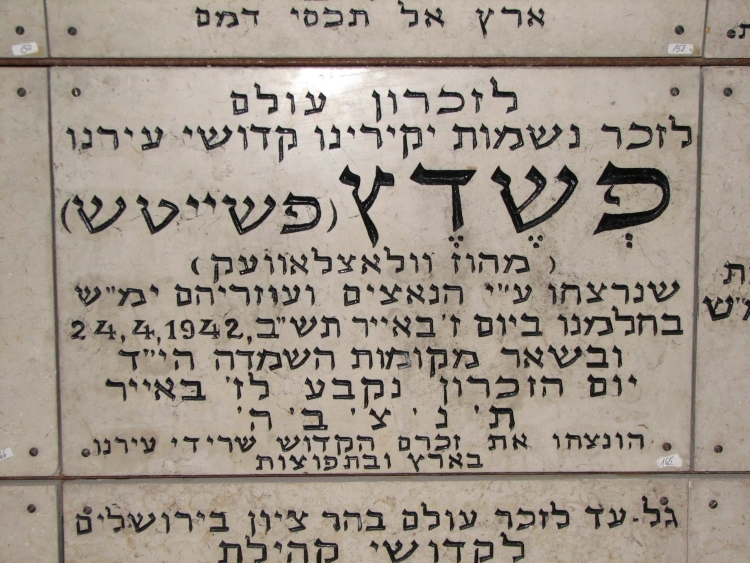
Memorial plaque for the Jews of Przedecz, Chamber of the Holocaust, Mount Zion, Jerusalem

The Jewish community of Przedecz, which accounted for a large proportion of the population of Przedecz, a town in western Poland, was wiped out in the Holocaust. In Yiddish the city was known as Pshaytsh. In Hebrew, it was called "Pshedetz". [See memorial plaque.] The town, which dates from the 14th century, is located midway between Chodecz and Kłodawa. It is 75 km (47 mi) northwest of Łódź, 150 km (93 mi) west of Warsaw and 130 km (81 mi) east of Poznań. On the southeast, it borders on Lake Przedecz.

== Early history ==
The earliest mention of Przedecz is in the 12th century, when it was owned by the Archbishops. In the second half of the 14th century, King Kazimierz purchased Przedecz and the surrounding lands from the Archbishops. It became a transit station for traders travelling from south to north and east to west, and a commercial center for the surrounding farms.

Przedecz was granted city status before the end of the 14th century.

During the period of the Archbishops, Jews were forbidden to live there. Jewish settlement in Przedecz began towards the end of the 14th century. The Jewish cemetery is about six hundred years old.

In 1538, a major fire destroyed most of Przedecz. Ten years later, the king granted the right to produce and market liqueurs without paying taxes and allowed a market day each week.

During the war with Sweden in the mid-17th century, Przedecz was destroyed. Only forty houses remained. The financial situation of Przedecz flourished at the beginning of the 18th century when the king gave permission to have two market days each week and a fair six times a year.

== Jewish life ==
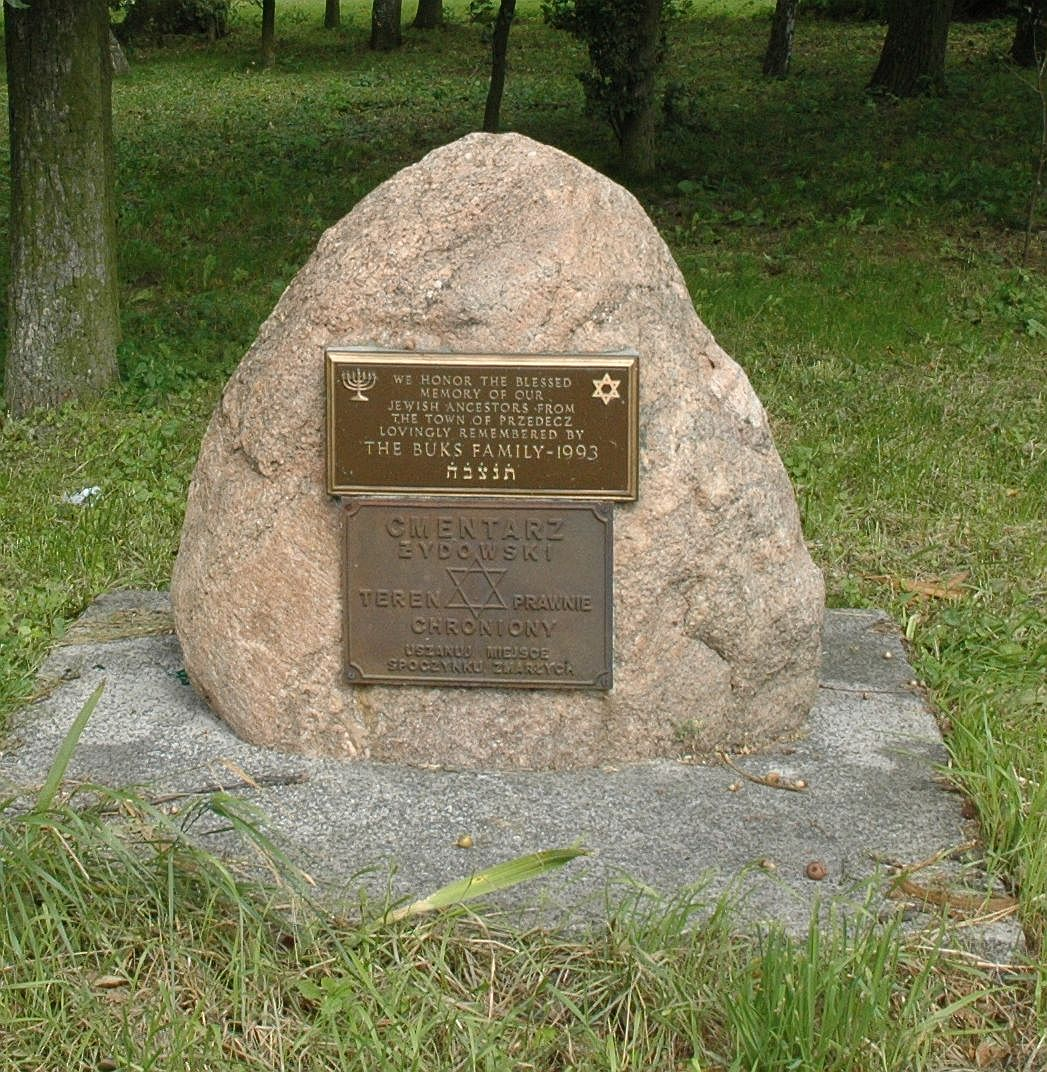
Memorial at the site of the Przedecz Jewish cemetery

In a 1793 census, the population of Przedecz was 355, 139 of them Jews. By 1827, the town had grown to 1,935 persons, 346 of them Jews. Over the next three decades, the total population increased by only 2,000, whereas the Jewish population rose to 606. In other words, during these thirty years, the percentage of Jews radically increased. This occurred because Jews from the neighbouring villages moved to Przedecz. By 1921, the population was 3,040, of whom 840 were Jews.

Przedecz consisted of a few streets, but it had all the components of Jewish community life: a synagogue, Beth midrash, mikva, Jewish schools, a yeshiva, Jewish library, Jewish cemetery, eruv, welfare and cultural organisations. Przedecz had its own rabbi, shochet and mohel.

In the early days, the shechitah of animals took place in the butcher's backyard, and the shechitah of fowl in the shochet's backyard. Prior to the Second World War, a large abattoir was built under the auspices of the Local Council. In this new abattoir, sanitary conditions were better and there was regular veterinary inspection by the Polish authorities.

Many Jews were tailors, hatmakers, cobblers, etc. They worked from their homes assisted by their children and other employees, sometimes traveling from city to city to sell their wares. Other were small traders.

Each village had its market day; for Przedecz it was Monday. On Mondays, the non-Jews would come from their farms to sell butter, eggs and chickens, and stock up on items they needed produced by the Jews. From morning to evening, the market was crowded with people.

Apart from the big synagogue of Przedecz, there was a Chevrat Tehillim. This served as a synagogue for the artisans of the city. Services were also held in the Bet Hamedrash. The Bet Hamedrash had its own library. On Fridays two boys aged 13–14 went around the houses collecting money to buy new books and pay for the rebinding of the old ones.

The mikvah was situated very near to the lake and quite near to the Chevrat Tehillim. The city had its own eruv, which enabled the Jewish residents to carry in the streets on Shabbat. On occasions when the eruv was down, the children would carry the siddurim and tallitot to the synagogue and bring the cholent to the houses from the bakery.

The religious affairs of the community were controlled by a committee (Parnasai Ha’ir). Every year members of the community would meet in the Bet Hamedrash and elect eight members to this committee. The function of the committee was to fix the salary of the rabbi and other religious officials, the price for shechitah, the charge for the mikvah, etc. A tax was levied on the families in order to pay for these services.

In Przedecz, there was a state elementary school. There was no high school and thus pupils who wished to study in a high school had to go to neighbouring cities. The elementary school was attended by both Jewish and non-Jewish children of the city. At first it was situated in the same building as the town hall, the school being upstairs and the town hall downstairs, but later a new large building was built on Stoldona Street.

For their religious instruction there was a Bet Sefer Ivri, which would meet after regular school hours. Subjects such as Tanakh (Bible) and Dinim (Jewish law) were taught in this Bet Sefer Ivri. In the religious education of the children, particularly of the boys, a love for Eretz Israel was prominent. In addition there was a Bet Ya’acov school for the more religious girls, although most of the Jews in Przedecz were observant. In the courtyard of the Bet Hamedrash there was another more religiously oriented school. There was also a yeshivah, whose principal was Rabbi Joseph Alexander Zemelman, the rabbi of Przedecz. For those who wanted to learn a trade such as tailoring, hatmaking or shoemaking, there were evening classes.

The city had a Jewish library that also functioned as a cultural centre. People met there in the evenings to read books, dance, listen to lectures, watch theatre performances, etc. The more religiously observant used the Agudah or Mizrachi facilities.

There were also welfare organisations in Przedecz, such as the Bikur Cholim society, which looked after the sick, and a "Benevolent Fund" which granted interest-free loans to needy Jews.

In 1926, with the assistance of the "Joint" a Jewish bank was set up in Przedecz. The main purpose of this bank was the granting of loans. These loans were made according to usual banking procedures and required two guarantors who were acceptable to the bank. This bank closed in 1936 as a result of the difficult financial situation of the Jews at that period.

During the 20th century, various Zionist groups were established in Przedecz, including branches of the General Zionists, Poale Zion Yemin, Hashomer Hatzair, the Mizrachi and the Revisionists. Money was collected in Przedecz for the J.N.F. There were also a few Bundists.

In 1937 there were seventy people who had voting rights for delegates to the 20th Zionist Congress held in Zurich that year, of whom all but three utilised their rights. The establishment of these groups caused friction between those of the right and those of the left. As a result, those of the left stopped coming to the Jewish library. For the younger people there was the Young Mizrachi and Betar. The programmes of these youth groups included activities on Shabbat afternoons.

Agudat Yisrael also had a branch in Przedecz, most of its members being Gerrer Hassidim. One of the people active in this branch was the Rabbi of Przedecz, Rabbi Zemelman.

There was even Hachsharah (preparing people for aliyah to Eretz Israel) in Przedecz. This group had some fields in which young people planted and grew vegetables which they then sold in Przedecz.

The houses in Przedecz were mostly just one story high. Some were owned by the Jewish residents and others were rented from non-Jews. There was no running water in the houses. In the centre of Przedecz was a pump. Electricity was only installed in 1928. Before that, the residents used gas lights. There were very few telephones in Przedecz and radio was a luxury.

== German occupation ==
In September 1939, Germany entered Poland and the Second World War began. A few weeks later on the night of the Festival of Shemini Atzeret, 4 October 1939, the Germans set fire to the Przedecz synagogue. On the day after the Festival, the Germans summoned the Rabbi of the city together with some of the leaders of the community and they were forced to sign a statement that the Jews themselves had burnt down the synagogue and in addition they had to pay a fine for so doing.

The Germans changed the name of the city to Moosburg.

In 1940 there were 769 Jews in Przedecz and nearly half of them were sent to forced labour camps. The majority of them died there from hunger and disease. The Germans set up a ghetto in Przedecz which was situated in the Old Market. In April 1942, the Germans packed the remaining Jews into the Catholic church, where they were left with no food or water for three days. Many of them died from lack of air. On 24 April 1942 – 7 Iyar 5702 – the remaining Jews were loaded into trucks and sent to the Chełmno extermination camp and the Jewish community of Przedecz was thus finally liquidated.

The 7th of Iyar has become the Memorial Day for this community.

The Rabbi of Przedecz, Rabbi Zemelman, is believed to have escaped to Warsaw, where he and a small number of his students took an active part in the Warsaw Ghetto Uprising. There may have been thirteen survivors in the community.

== Today ==
Since the mid-1960s, former residents of Przedecz and their descendants have gone back to visit. A delegation from the Association of Descendents of Jewish Central Poland visited in May of 2023 and were well received by the Mayor and other town officials. Where the synagogue had formerly stood, today there is a community center. All that remains of the Jewish cemetery is an empty field and trees. The tombstones are no longer in the cemetery, although a local resident has rescued some dozen or so and believes that other tombstones were dumped nearby under water. Today no Jews live in Przedecz. A memorial was erected in the cemetery by the son of Arye Buks, whose daughter, Daniele Buks Henry, now lives in Texas, USA. Very few survived the Holocaust, but some managed survived the war in Russia, others left Poland before the war or on the eve of the war, settling in Israel, the United States and Mexico. Those survivors wrote a Yizkor Book, written partly in Yiddish and partly in Hebrew. The book has been translated into English and also from English into Polish. These translations can be found on the web site JewishGen.org.

== See also ==
- History of the Jews in Poland
