= Melaniia Bordun =

Ukrainian educator, historian (1886–1968)

- Меланія Дмитрівна Бордун
- Born: 17 July 1886; Khlivchany, now Lviv Oblast, Ukraine
- Died: 5 February 1968 (aged 81); Sambir, Lviv Oblast, Ukraine
- Education: University of Lviv, University of Vienna
- Occupations: Educator, historian

Melaniia Bordun (Ukrainian: Меланія Дмитрівна Бордун; 17 July 1886 – 5 February 1968) was a Ukrainian educator, historian. Member of the Shevchenko Scientific Society (1912).

== Biography ==
Melaniia Bordun was born on 17 July 1886, in Khlivchany (now Belz Hromada, Sheptytskyi Raion, Lviv Oblast, Ukraine).

Until 1907, she studied at the Sambir Gymnasium. In 1912, she graduated from the Faculty of Philosophy at University of Lviv, and later continued her studies at the Faculty of History at the University of Vienna. She was part of a scientific circle of researchers formed by Mykhailo Hrushevskyi. In 1911–1912, she worked as a full-time employee in the library of the Andrey Sheptytsky National Museum of Lviv.

She was a member of the Ukrainian akademichna pomich society in Lviv, from 1912 — a member of the women's circle of the Hanna Barvinok Ukrainian Pedagogical Society, and also the Uchytelska hromada society.

From 1914 to 1921, she taught at the Basilian Sisters' gymnasium in Lviv, and from 1921 to 1939, she headed the Institute for Girls in Przemyśl. During the World War II, she lived in Sambir, where she worked as the director of a vocational tailoring school, and then as a teacher in the village of Biskovychi, Sambir Raion.

She researched the daily life of Ukrainian priests during the Polish rule. She paid special attention to how priests were dependent on local landlords, as well as the problem of insufficient education among the rural clergy.

She died on 5 February 1968, in Sambir, where she was buried in the family tomb.

Among her works:

- Z zhyttia ukrainskoho dukhovenstva Lvivskoi hreko-katolytskoi yeparkhii v 2-y pol. 18 st. // Zapysky NTS. 1912. Vol. 109–110.

== Bibliography ==
- Семчишин Б. Просвітителька і вихователька молоді: До 25-річчя від дня смерті // Самбірські вісті. 1993, 13 берез.
- Єдлінська У. Меланія Бордун — людина і педагог (1886–1968) // Український інститут для дівчат у Перемишлі. Дрогобич, 1995.
- Дядюк М. Участь жінок у діяльності Наукового товариства імені Шевченка: Хронікал.-бібліогр. аспект // З історії НТШ: 3б. доповідей і повідомлень наук. сесій і конф. НТШ у Львові. Л., 1998.
