= Téboursouk =

- Commune and town
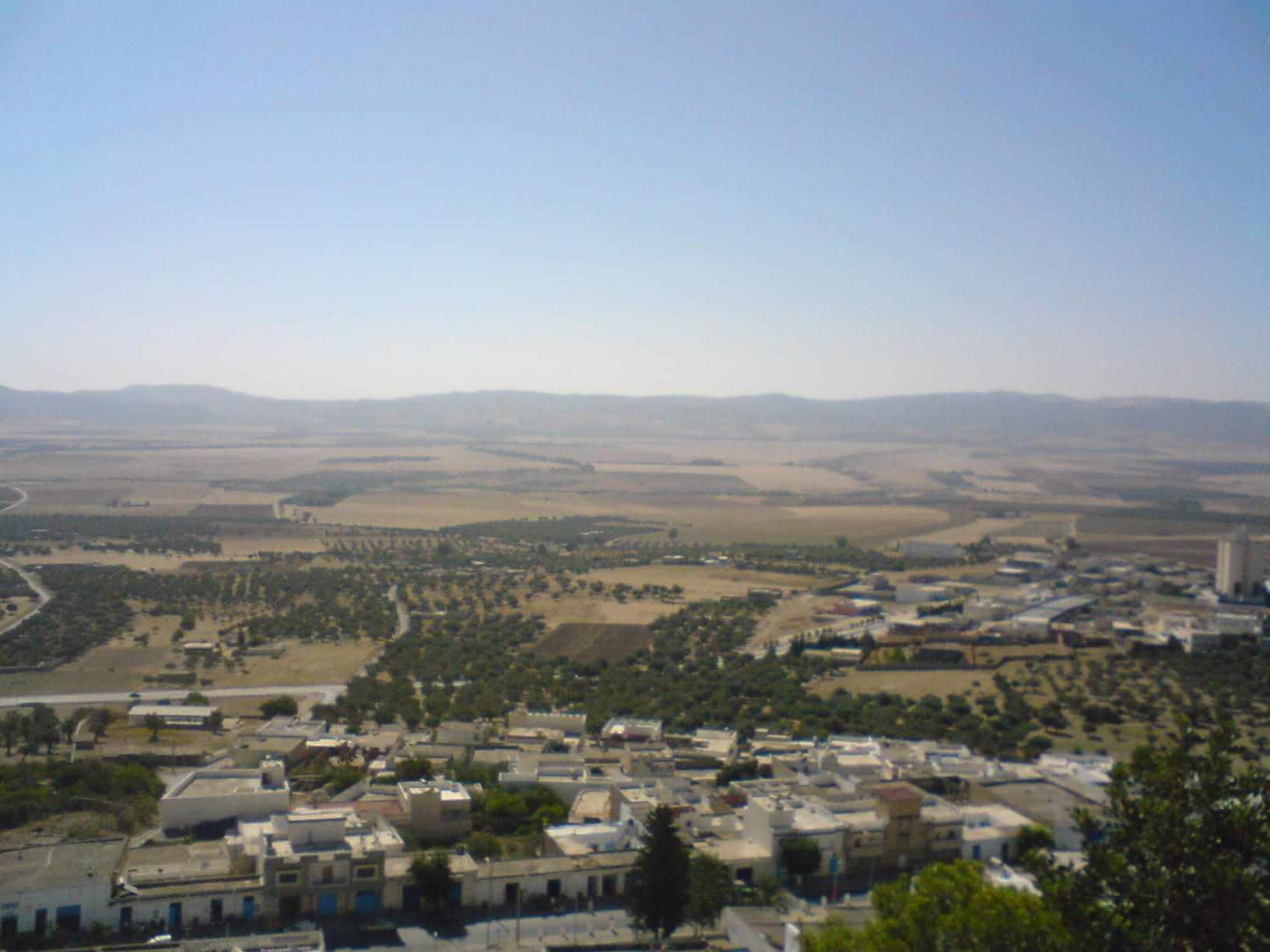

- Téboursouk in the Béja Governorate
- Coordinates: 36°27′26″N 009°14′54″E
- Country: Tunisia
- Governorate: Béja Governorate

Population (2022)
  - Total: 21,022
- Time zone: UTC+1 (CET)

Téboursouk (Tunisian Arabic: تبرسق Tābūrsūq) is a town and commune in the Béja Governorate, Tunisia. It is located at 36° 27′ 26″N, 009° 14′ 54″E.

== Population ==
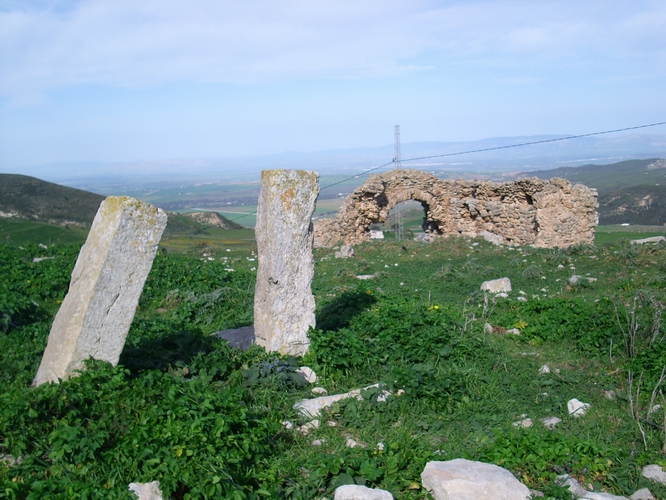
Ruins at Téboursouk.

In 2004 it had a total population of 10,987, and of 22,115 inhabitants in 2014.

== Geography ==
The town is part of the governorate of Béja, and it constitutes a municipality. Located at the foot of the Téboursouk Mountains in the Tunisian ridge, the city is built half-way up a hill at 400 m (1,300 ft) above sea level. It overlooks olive groves in the valley of Wadi Khalled.

Téboursouk is located on the territory of the Berber tribe of the Bejaoua, near the Drid tribe, at the northern end of the Haut-Tell. Located 4.6 km (2.9 mi) away are the ruins of the Roman city of Dougga.

== History ==
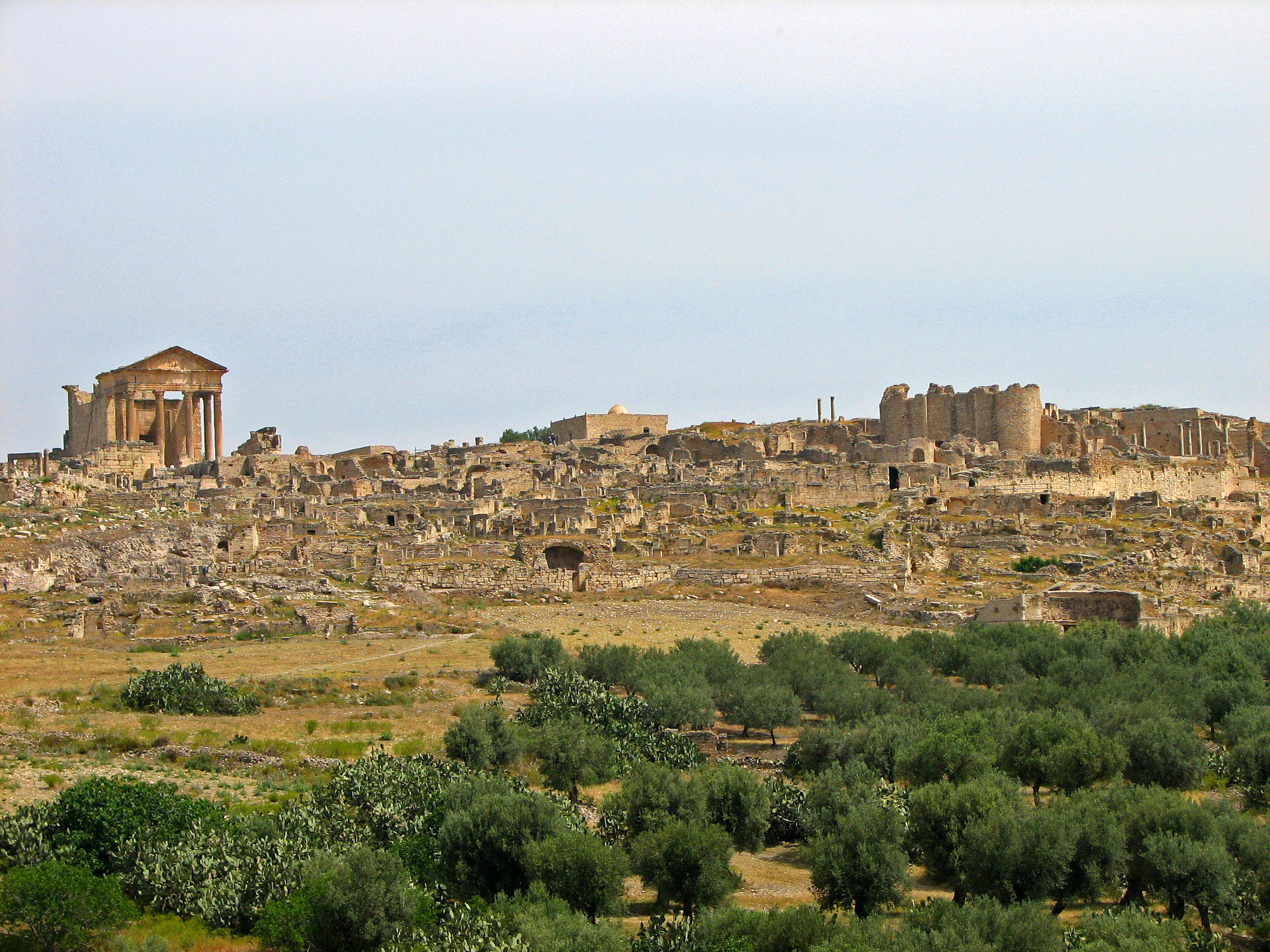
Roman ruins at Téboursouk.

During the Roman Empire, Téboursouk was known as "Tubursico-Bure", and was in the Roman province of Africa Proconsularis. The ruins of ancient Thubursicum Bure are a large Byzantine enclosure of pentagonal form, erected under the reign of Justin II (565-578), and whose northern front encompasses a Roman gate and cemetery.

The Roman city was considered a municipium.

The city obtained the statute of municipality in 1904 under the French protectorate and the status of chief town of delegation at the independence of Tunisia. In 2004, the municipality celebrated the centenary of its creation.

=== Bishopric ===
During Roman and Byzantine times the city was the seat of a Catholic diocese, the suffragan of Archdiocese of Carthage.

There are four documented bishops of Téboursouk. Servus Dei is mentioned by Augustine of Hippo in his Contra Cresconium around 404 and he had as a competitor the Donatist Bishop, Cyprian, who, according to the testimony of Augustine, was deposed by Primianus (the Donatist Bishop of Carthage) because Cyprian was caught in a brothel.

At the conference of Carthage of 411 between Catholic bishops and Donatists the same Servus Dei was joined by the Donatist bishop Donatus who had replaced the now disgraced Cyprian.

Bishop Reparatus attended the Council of Carthage (525).

Today Tubursico-Bure survives as titular bishopric and the current titular bishop is Mykhaylo Bubniy, Exarch Archbishop of Odesa.

== See also ==
- List of cities in Tunisia
