= Ukrainian Catholic Archiepiscopal Exarchate of Krym =

Ukrainian Catholic missionary jurisdiction in southern Ukraine

Coordinates: 46.4667°N 30.7333°E

Archiepiscopal Exarchate of Krym

Location
- Country: Ukraine
- Territory: Autonomous Republic of Crimea
- Headquarters: Simferopol, Ukraine de jure
- Population: ?

Information
- Sui iuris church: Ukrainian Greek Catholic
- Rite: Byzantine
- Established: 13 February 2014
- Cathedral: Ukrainian Catholic Cathedral in Simferopol

Current leadership
- Pope: Leo XIV
- Major Archbishop: Sviatoslav Shevchuk
- Apostolic Administrator: Mykhaylo Bubniy, C.S.S.R., Archiepiscopal Administrator

Map

The Archiepiscopal Exarchate of Krym (Latin: Archiepiscopi Exarchatus Crimenses) is a Ukrainian Greek Catholic exarchate of the Catholic Church. It was established on 13 February 2014 from the Ukrainian Catholic Archiepiscopal Exarchate of Odesa – Crimea.

Because of the Annexation of Crimea by the Russian Federation in March 2014 some part of faithful and clergy left the exarchate and an exarch was not appointed. Currently, the exarchate is governed by the Archiepiscopal Administrator Mykhaylo Bubniy, who is also the exarch of the Exarchate of Odesa.

The exarchate is one of only five Archiepiscopal Exarchates in the world, all of which are part of the particular Ukrainian Greek Catholic Church.

== Status as Archiepiscopal Exarchate ==
As Major Archbishops have similar authority to that of Patriarchs, Archiepiscopal Exarchates similarly have roughly the same status in canon law as Patriarchal Exarchates.
