= Mykhaylo Bubniy =

Ukrainian Greek Catholic bishop

Mykhaylo Bubniy, C.Ss.R.
- Archiepiscopal Exarch of Ukrainian Catholic Archiepiscopal Exarchate of Odesa
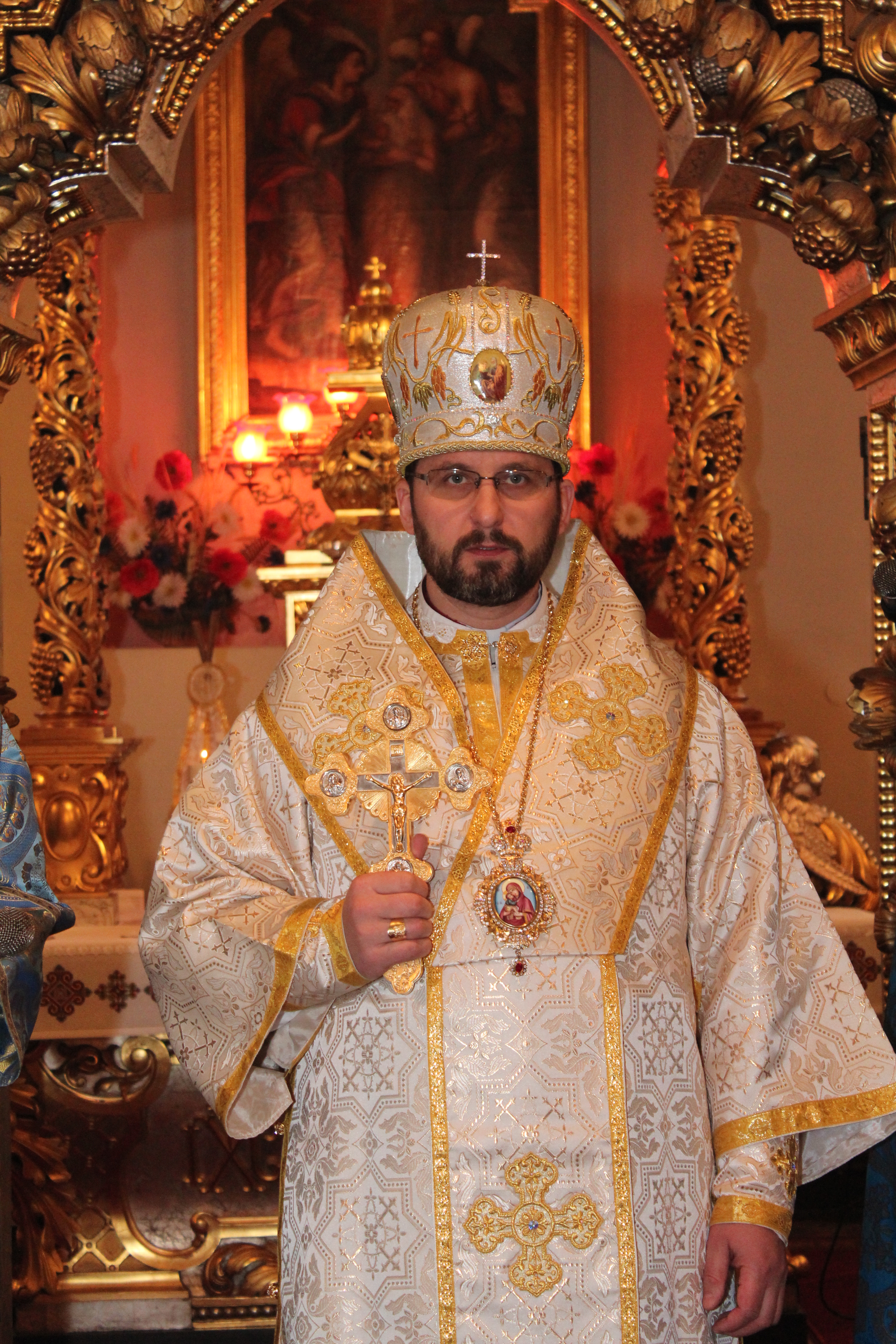
- Church: Ukrainian Greek Catholic Church
- Appointed: 13 February 2014
- Predecessor: New Creation
- Successor: Incumbent
- Other posts: Titular Bishop of Thubursicum-Bure (since 2014); Archiepiscopal Administrator of Archiepiscopal Exarchate of Krym (since 2014)

Orders
- Ordination: 19 August 1997 (Priest) by Lubomyr Husar
- Consecration: 7 April 2014 (Bishop) by Sviatoslav Shevchuk

Personal details
- Born: Mykhaylo Ivanovych Bubniy; 16 September 1970 (age 55) Khlivchany, Sokal Raion, Lviv Oblast, Ukrainian SSR

Bishop Mykhaylo Bubniy, C.Ss.R. (Ukrainian: Михайло Бубній; born 16 September 1970 in Khlivchany, Sokal Raion, Lviv Oblast, Ukrainian SSR) is a Ukrainian Greek Catholic hierarch as an Archiepiscopal Exarch of Ukrainian Catholic Archiepiscopal Exarchate of Odesa, Archiepiscopal Administrator of Ukrainian Catholic Archiepiscopal Exarchate of Krym and Titular Bishop of Thubursicum-Bure since 2 April 2014.

Coat of arms of Bishop Mykhaylo Bubniy

== Life ==
Bishop Bubniy was born in the family of Ivan Bubniy in Sokal Raion, where he grew up. After graduation of the school education, he joined the Congregation of the Most Holy Redeemer in 1991.

In the Congregation he made a profession on 19 August 1992 and a solemn profession on 7 April 1996. Bubniy was ordained as priest on 19 August 1997, after completed philosophical and theological studies in the Major Redemptorists Theological Seminary in Tuchów, Poland and Pontifical Theological Academy in Kraków, Poland.

After returning from studies in Poland, he had a various pastoral assignments and served as professor, superior and finally, as a Rector of the Major Theological Redemptorists Institute in Lviv, Ukraine from 2005 until 2007, and then continued his studies in the Pontifical Oriental Institute in Rome with a Licentiate of the Canon Law degree.

On 13 February 2014 Fr. Bubniy was appointed and on 7 April 2014 was consecrated to the Episcopate as the second Archiepiscopal Exarch of the Ukrainian Catholic Archiepiscopal Exarchate of Odesa and the Titular Bishop of Thubursicum-Bure. In the same time he was appointed as an Archiepiscopal Administrator of the new created Ukrainian Catholic Archiepiscopal Exarchate of Krym. The principal consecrator was Sviatoslav Shevchuk, the Head of the Ukrainian Greek Catholic Church.

Catholic Church titles
Preceded by Aloísio Jorge Pena Vitral	Titular Bishop of Thubursicum-Bure; 2014–present	Incumbent
Preceded by Vasyl Ivasyuk (as Archepiscopal Exarch of Odesa–Krym)	Archepiscopal Exarch of Odesa; 2014–present	Incumbent
New title	Archiepiscopal Administrator of Archiepiscopal Exarchate of Krym; 2014–present	Incumbent
