= Armenian Monastery of Saint Saviour (Jerusalem) =

Armenian monastery in Jerusalem

Coordinates: 31.77260°N 35.22950°E

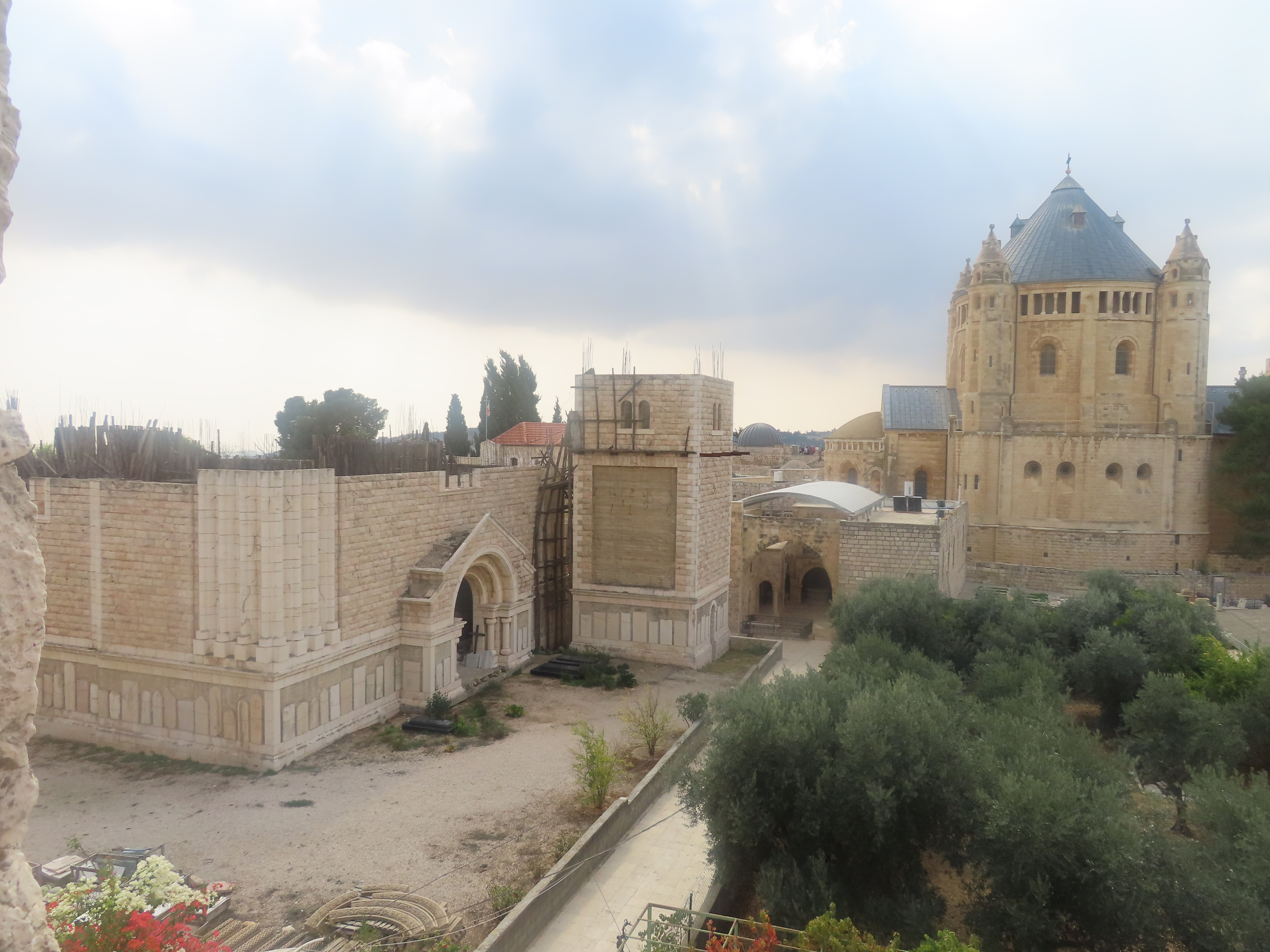

The Monastery (Convent) of Saint Saviour (Armenian: Սուրբ Փրկիչ վանք) is a monastery of the Armenian Church in Jerusalem on Mount Zion. Outside of the Armenian Quarter, Old City, it is south of the Zion Gate. It includes two church buildings, the newer of which is unfinished.

== Traditions ==
The house of Caiaphas, the Jewish high priest at the time of Jesus' death, is believed to be on the site. However, some Christians conflated Caiaphas' house with the house of Annas (Annas was Caiaphas' father-in-law and a former high priest).

It is also called Dair Habs al-Masih (دير حبس المسيح Dayr Ḥabs al-Masīḥ, lit. 'monastery of the Masīḥ's prison') in Arabic, since it is one of the supposed locations of the prison of Christ, where he was held after the Sanhedrin trial. Because the gospels themselves disagree whether Jesus was brought to Annas' or Caiaphas' house/court, the Armenian Church of the Holy Archangels ("house of Annas") also has a prison of Christ.

A stone relocated from the entrance of the tomb of Christ is also believed to be over or under the altar at the older church in the monastery.

== History ==
A church or chapel possibly existed on this site by the 1160s.

There was an Armenian claim that Saladin granted the Armenians the site after he took over the city in 1187. At the end of the 13th century, Karapet of Tosp, a vardapet, purchased the property from local Muslims and got a restoration permit from the Mamluk sultan.

In 1517, Sultan Selim I issued firmans that confirmed the church to both the Armenians and Greeks. In the 17th century, when Francesco Quaresmi visited, Armenians were on the property.

During the 18th century, the church's courtyard became a burial ground for some Armenian patriarchs of Jerusalem.

After the 1948 Arab–Israeli War, the church was abandoned and used by Israeli snipers.

The Armenians regained the church after 1967 and repaired the church. In the 1970s, construction for a new church began, next to the original one. However, due to still-unresolved planning and zoning issues, construction halted, and the new church remains unfinished to this date.

In January 2023, the monastery's walls were desecrated by Jewish extremists with vandalized messages of "Death to Armenians, Christians, Arabs, and Gentiles".

== Environs ==
An Armenian civil cemetery next to the church is still used for burial, but it is mostly abandoned due to the shrinking local Armenian community.

The monastery is next to the Benedictine Abbey of the Dormition.
