= Khlivchany =

Rural locality in Lviv Oblast, Ukraine

Khlivchany Хлівчани
- Location in Lviv Oblast Khlivchany (Ukraine)
- Coordinates: 50°18′29″N 23°55′32″E
- Country: Ukraine
- Oblast: Lviv Oblast
- Raion: Sheptytskyi Raion
- Hromada: Belz urban hromada
- Time zone: UTC+2 (EET)
  - Summer (DST): UTC+3 (EEST)
- Postal code: 80070

Khlivchany (Ukrainian: Хлівчани) is a village in the Belz urban hromada of the Sheptytskyi Raion of Lviv Oblast in Ukraine.

== History ==
The village of Khlivchany is described in detail in the 1565 royal lustracja.

On 19 July 2020, as a result of the administrative-territorial reform and liquidation of the Sokal Raion, the village became part of the Sheptytskyi Raion.

== Religion ==
- Church of the Nativity of the Virgin Mary (1841, wooden, architectural monument).

== Notable residents ==
- Melaniia Bordun (1886–1968), Ukrainian educator, historian
- Mykhaylo Bubniy (born 1970), Ukrainian Greek Catholic bishop

== Bibliography ==
- "Chlewczany". Geographical Dictionary of the Kingdom of Poland (in Polish). 1. Warszawa: Kasa im. Józefa Mianowskiego. 1880. p. 582.
