= Voroniv =

Village in Lviv Oblast, Ukraine

Voroniv Воронів
- Selo
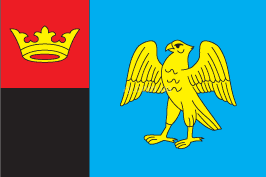
- Flag

- Location of Voroniv in Ukraine Voroniv (Ukraine)
- Coordinates: 50.351923°N 23.899198°E
- Country: Ukraine
- Oblast: Lviv Oblast
- Raion: Sheptytskyi Raion
- Founded: 1614
- Elevation: 150 m (490 ft)

Population (2010)
  - Total: 115
- Time zone: UTC+2 (EET)
  - Summer (DST): UTC+3 (EEST)
- Sister cities: Békéscsaba

Voroniv (Ukrainian: Воронів; Polish: Woronów), is a selo located in western Ukraine. It is part of the Sheptytskyi Raion, Lviv Oblast, and is situated approximately 10 km from the western border with Poland. Voroniv belongs to Belz urban hromada, one of the hromadas of Ukraine.

Until 18 July 2020, Voroniv belonged to Sokal Raion. The raion was abolished in July 2020 as part of the administrative reform of Ukraine, which reduced the number of raions of Lviv Oblast to seven. The area of Sokal Raion was merged into Sheptytskyi Raion.
