= Przedecz =

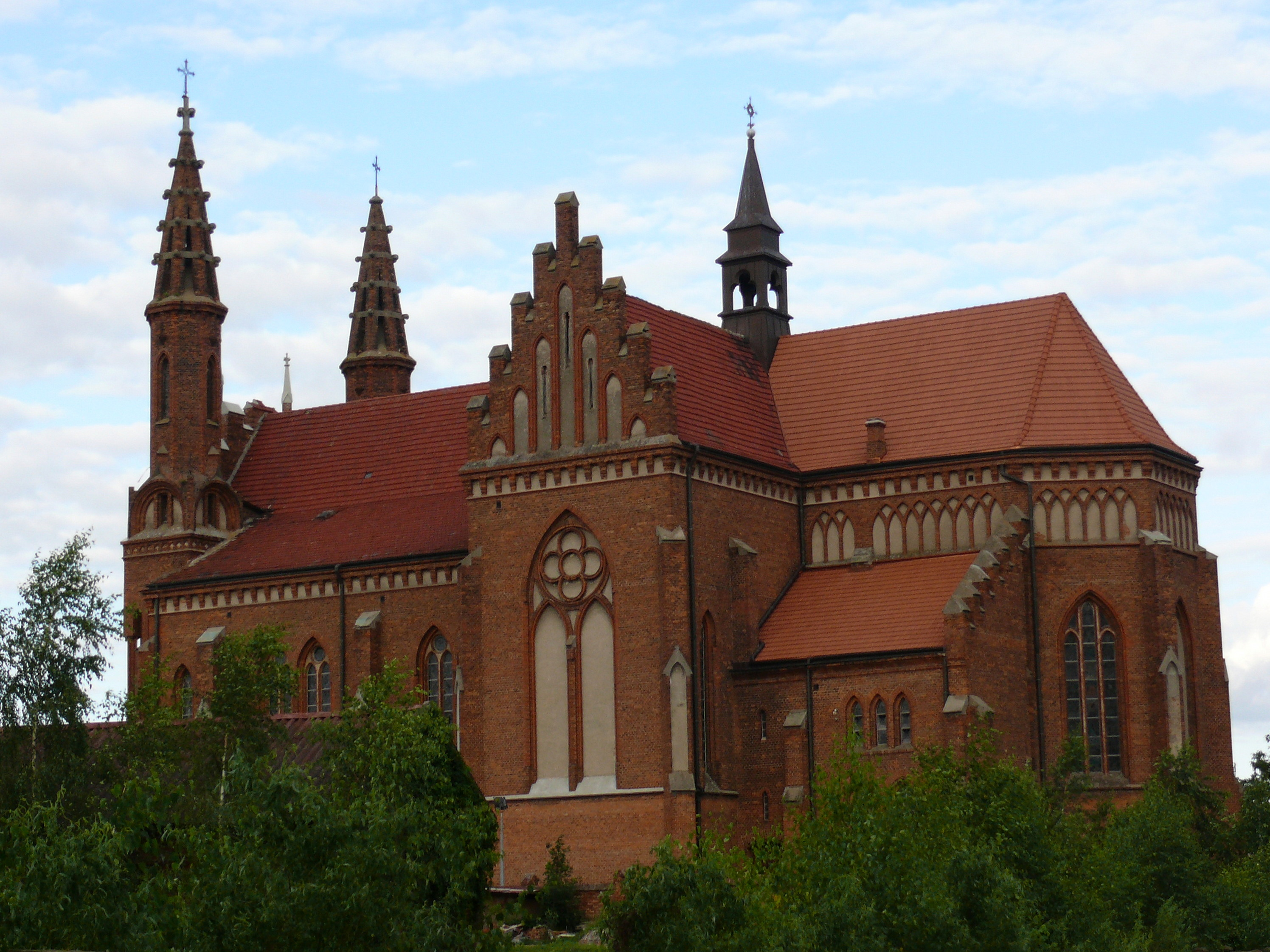
- Church of the Holy Family in Przedecz

- Coat of arms

- Location within Poland
- Coordinates: 52°20′02″N 18°53′56″E
- Country: Poland
- Voivodeship: Greater Poland
- County: Koło
- Gmina: Przedecz
- First mentioned: 1136
- Town rights: 1365

Area
  - Total: 2.98 km^{2} (1.15 sq mi)
- Elevation: 112 m (367 ft)

Population (2006)
  - Total: 1,771
  - Density: 594/km^{2} (1,540/sq mi)
- Time zone: UTC+1 (CET)
  - Summer (DST): UTC+2 (CEST)
- Postal code: 62-635
- Vehicle registration: PKL

Przedecz (Polish pronunciation: [ˈpʂɛdɛt͡ʂ]) is a historic town in Koło County in the Greater Poland Voivodeship in central Poland, with 1,779 inhabitants (2006).

== Geography ==
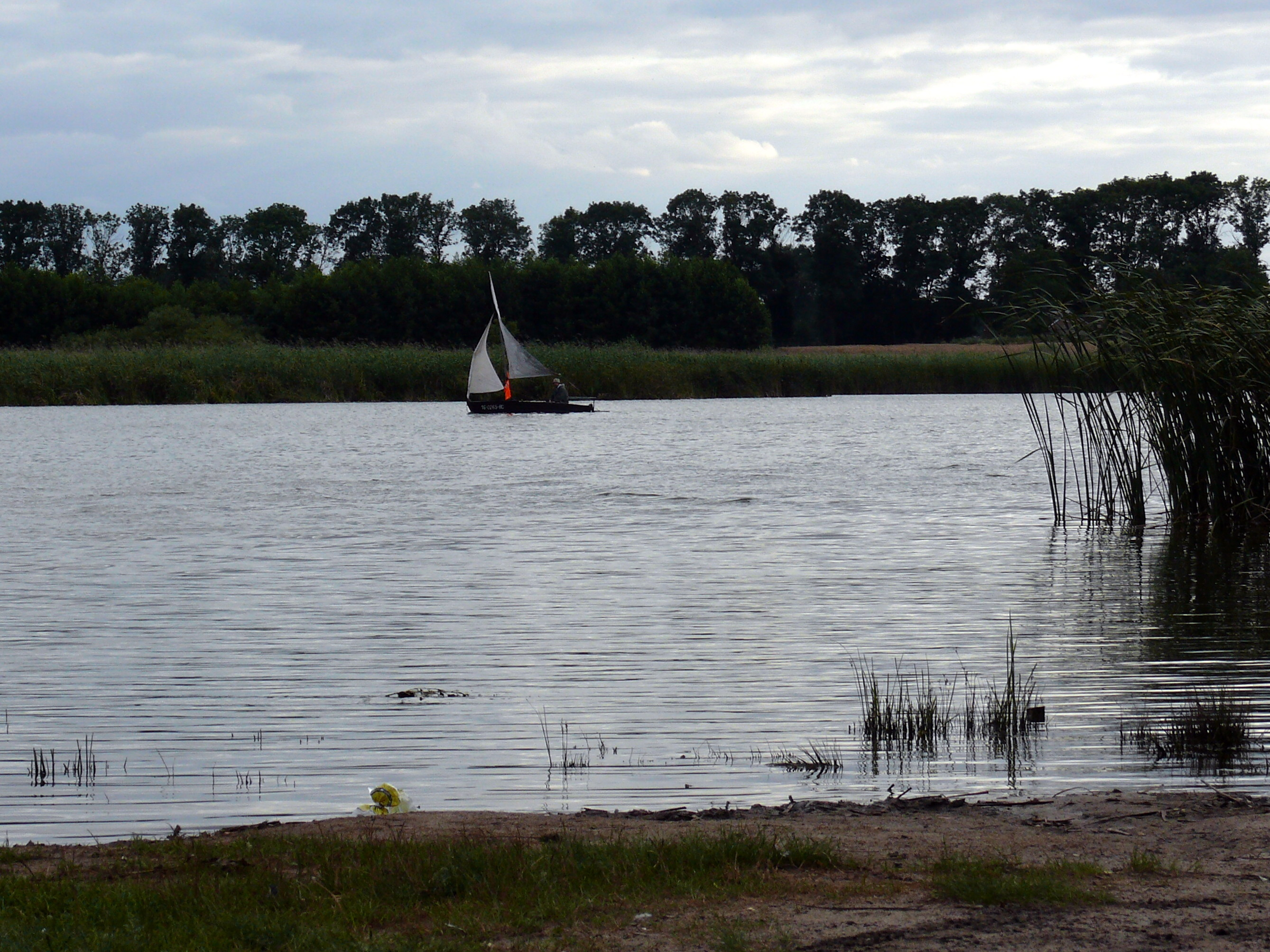
Lake Przedecz

The town is situated in central Poland, midway between Chodecz and Kłodawa. It is located about 75 km (47 mi) northwest of Łódź, 150 km (93 mi) west of Warsaw and 130 km (81 mi) east of Poznań.

The southeast side of Przedecz borders on the shore of Lake Przedecz. Nearby is one of the sources of the Noteć river.

== History ==
Przedecz was founded in the 11th or early 12th century, and was first mentioned in 1136 deed issued by Pope Innocent II, denoting the settlement as a possession held by the Polish Archbishops of Gniezno. With the historic Kujawy region, the fortified town was conquered by the Teutonic Knights during the First Polish–Teutonic War in 1329. The Teutonic Knights murdered the town's defenders. Re-acquired by King Casimir III the Great upon the 1343 Treaty of Kalisz, municipal laws were introduced in 1365 and Przedecz obtained the status of a royal city of the Kingdom of Poland. It was a county seat in the Brześć Kujawski Voivodeship in the Greater Poland Province. A castle with a round tower dating from that time was reconstructed in the 1970s. The city rights were confirmed according to Magdeburg town law by King Władysław II Jagiełło in 1420.

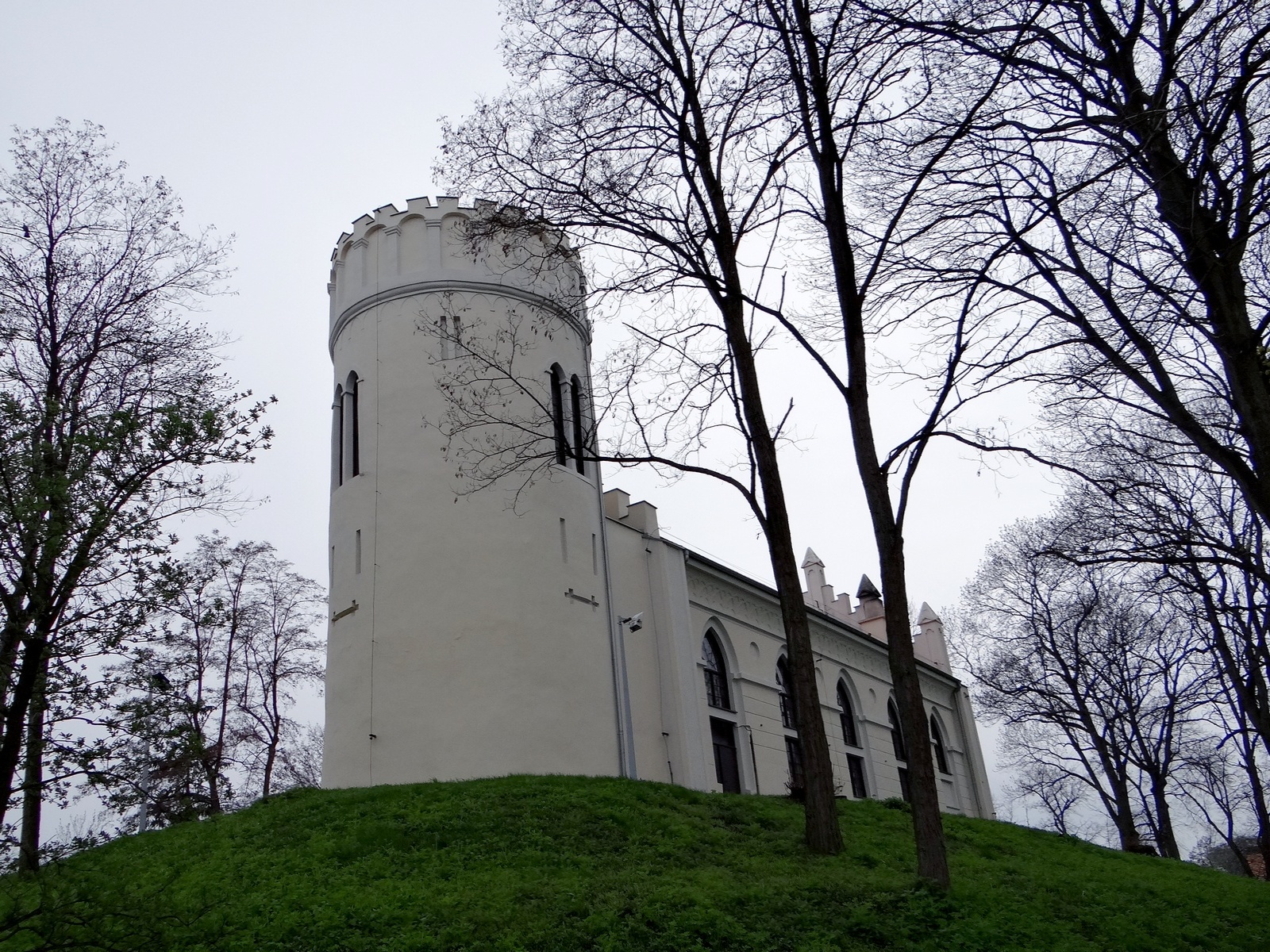
Przedecz Castle, which houses the a culture center and a museum

During the mid-17th-century Swedish Deluge campaigns, castle and town were burnt down completely. Upon the Second Partition of Poland in 1793, Przedecz was occupied by Prussian forces and incorporated into the newly established South Prussia province; it passed to the Napoleonic Duchy of Warsaw in 1807 and to Russian Congress Poland in 1815. From about 1824, a Protestant church was built by German settlers on the ruins of the medieval castle. The present town hall, a Neoclassical building, was erected in 1826. Other sites of interest comprise the early twentieth century Neo-Gothic parish church of the Holy Family by renown Polish architect Józef Pius Dziekoński. During the January Uprising, in February 1863, after the Russian regiment left the town, a Polish insurgent unit arrived, took over the local weapons storage and took 10 Russian prisoners of war. Przedecz was stripped of its town rights in 1867 as punishment for the Polish January Uprising. The town rights were restored in 1919, shortly after Poland regained independence in 1918.

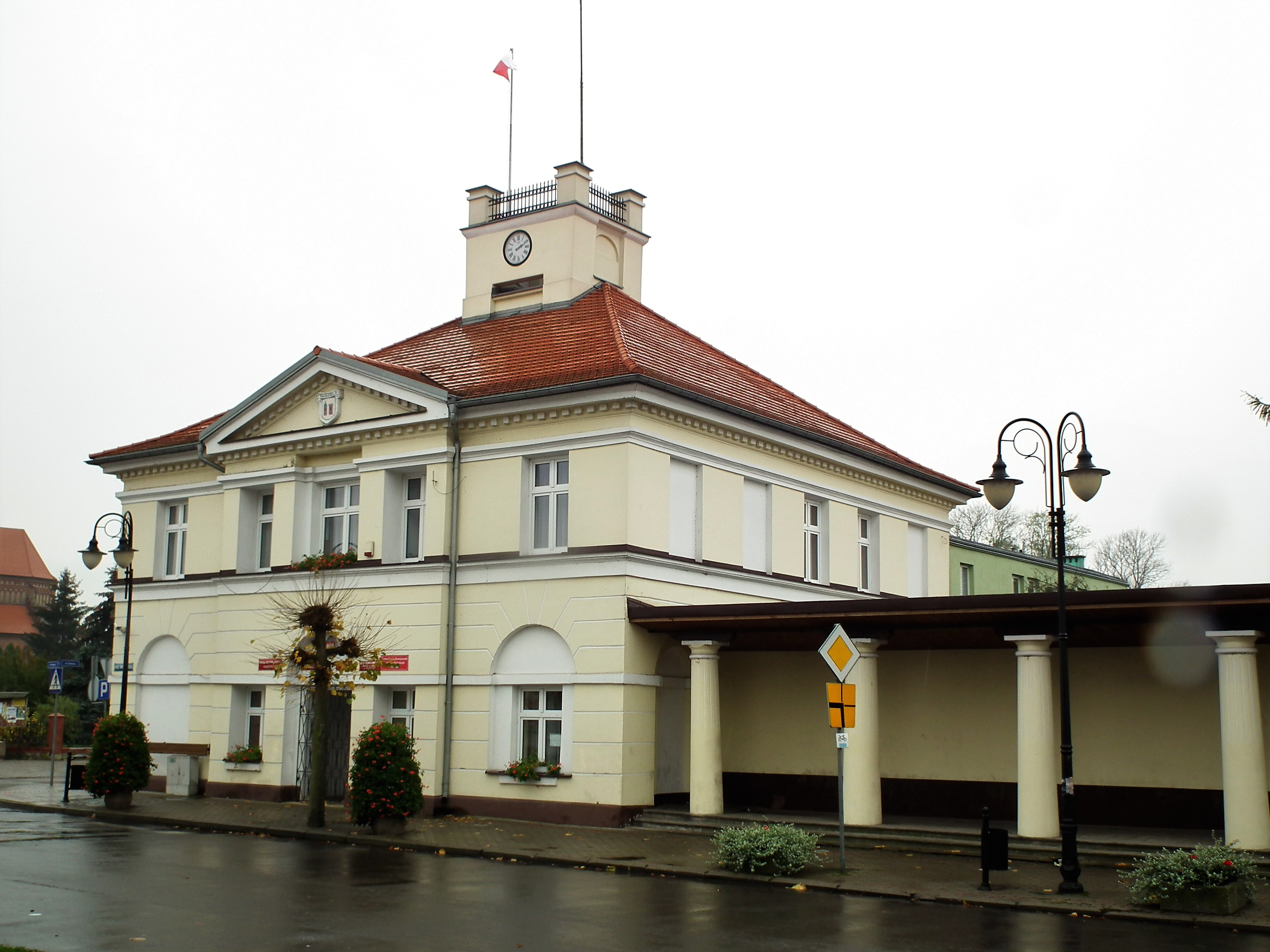
Przedecz town hall

During the German occupation of Poland (World War II), the Jewish community of Przedecz, numbering around 800 and comprising about 25 percent of the town's residents, was wiped out by the occupiers. Some were murdered in the town; most were sent to the Chełmno extermination camp where they were immediately gassed. There were only 13 known survivors but none returned to the town to live. Several historic buildings used by the community remain. In June 1940, 360 Poles were expelled from Przedecz, mostly to the General Government, while 50 Poles were deported to forced labour to Germany, and their houses, shops and workshops were then handed over to German colonists as part of the Lebensraum policy.

== Sports ==
The local football club is Baszta Przedecz. It competes in the lower leagues.

== Transport ==
Voivodeship road 269 bypasses Przedecz to the north.

The nearest railway station is Kłodawa.

== Notable people ==
Władysław Umiński (1865–1954), author
