= Belz urban hromada =

Hromada in Lviv Oblast, Ukraine

Belz urban hromada Белзька міська громада
- Hromada
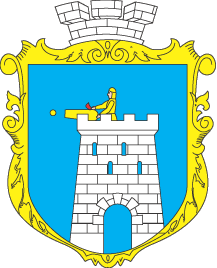
- Seal
- Interactive map of Belz urban hromada
- Country: Ukraine
- Oblast: Lviv Oblast
- Raion: Sheptytskyi Raion
- Admin. center: Belz

Area
  - Total: 4,615 km^{2} (1,782 sq mi)

Population (2021)
  - Total: 14,827
  - Density: 3.213/km^{2} (8.321/sq mi)
- CATOTTG code: UA46120010000054878
- Settlements: 24
- Cities: 2
- Villages: 22
- Website: belztg.gov.ua

Belz urban hromada (Ukrainian: Белзька міська громада) is a hromada in Ukraine, in Sheptytskyi Raion of Lviv Oblast. The administrative center is the city of Belz.

== Settlements ==
The hromada consists of 2 city (Belz, Uhniv) and 22 villages:

- Vaniv
- Verbove
- Voroniv
- Hlukhiv
- Dibrova
- Domashiv
- Zhuzheliany
- Zabolottia
- Zastavne
- Kariv
- Korchiv
- Mykhailivka
- Murovane
- Nyzy
- Ostrivok
- Peremyslovychi
- Piddubne
- Sebechiv
- Staivka
- Tiahliv
- Khlivchany
- Tsebliv
