= Chamber of the Holocaust =

Holocaust museum on Mount Zion in Jerusalem

Coordinates: 31°46′16.87″N 35°13′46.21″E

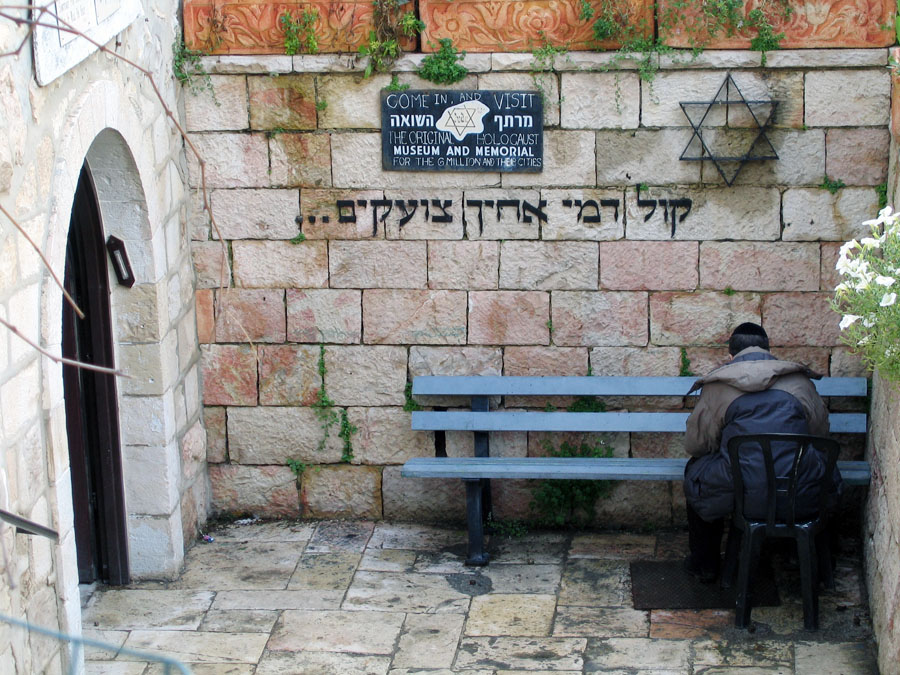
Museum entrance

Chamber of the Holocaust (Hebrew: מרתף השואה, Martef HaShoa, lit. "Cellar of the Catastrophe") is a small Holocaust museum located on Mount Zion in Jerusalem. It was Israel's first Holocaust museum.

== History ==
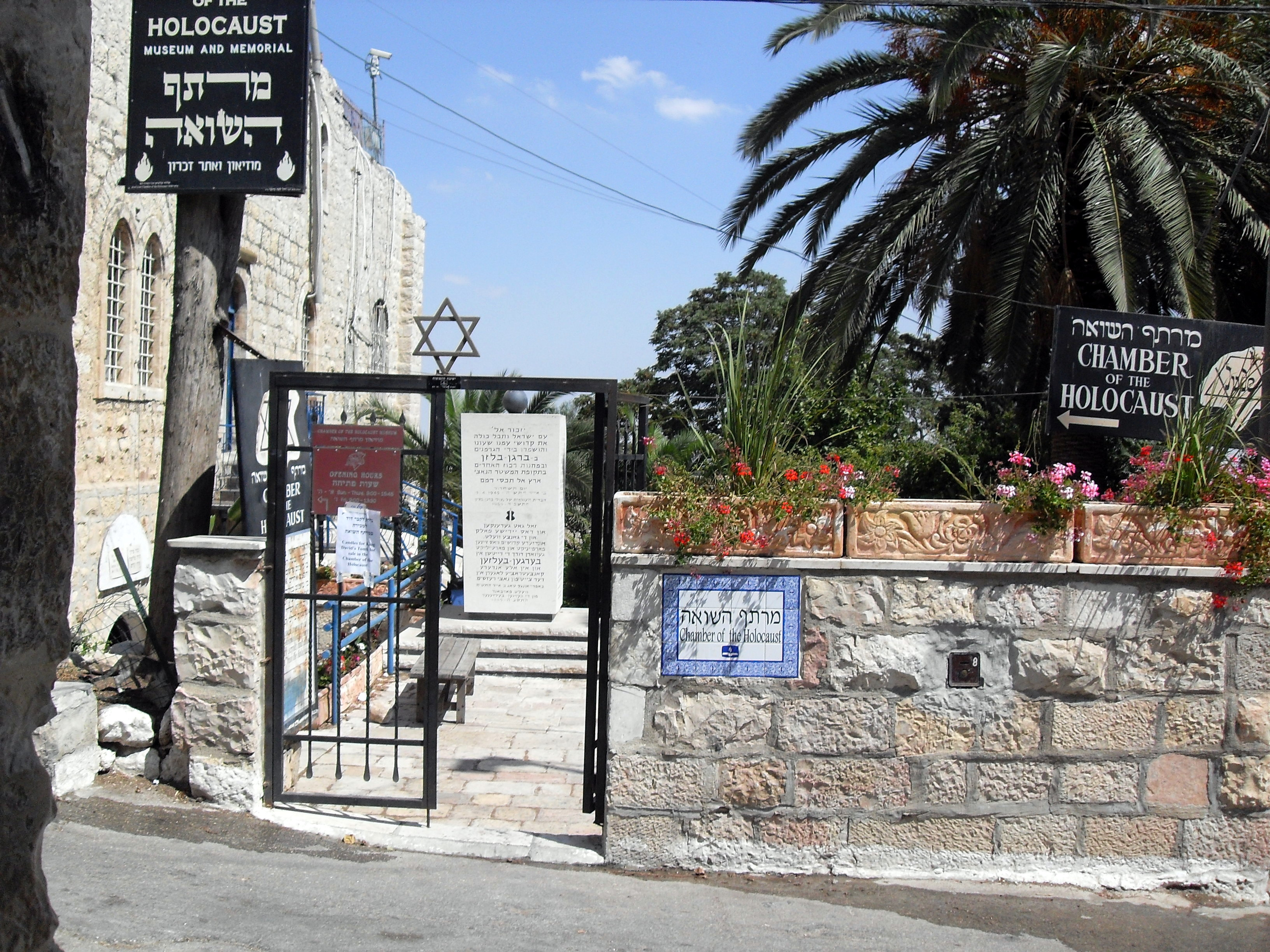

The memorial was inaugurated on 30 December 1949 by the Ministry of Religion and its Director-General, Rabbi Dr. Samuel Zangvil Kahane, whose purview included Mount Zion. That same year, Kahane oversaw the on-site burial of ashes of victims from the Oranienburg concentration camp together with desecrated Torah scrolls recovered from Nazi Europe.

In contrast to Yad Vashem, the government's official Holocaust memorial museum established in 1953 on Mount Herzl – a new site symbolizing rebirth after destruction – the Chief Rabbinate chose Mount Zion as the site for the Chamber of the Holocaust because of its proximity to David's Tomb, which symbolically connotes ancient Jewish history and the promise of messianic redemption (through the Messiah, son of David).

Scholars have noted that the somber ambience of the museum, whose dank, cave-like rooms are illuminated by candelight, is meant to portray the Holocaust as a continuation of the "death and destruction" that plagued Jewish communities throughout history.

== Description ==
The museum features a large courtyard and ten exhibition rooms. The walls of the courtyard plus several rooms and passages are covered with tombstone-like plaques inscribed in Hebrew, Yiddish, and English, memorializing more than 2,000 Jewish communities destroyed during the Holocaust. These plaques were generally sponsored by survivors from those communities, and survivors hold memorial services here on the anniversary of their town's destruction.

Below is an example, accompanied by a translation of the text:

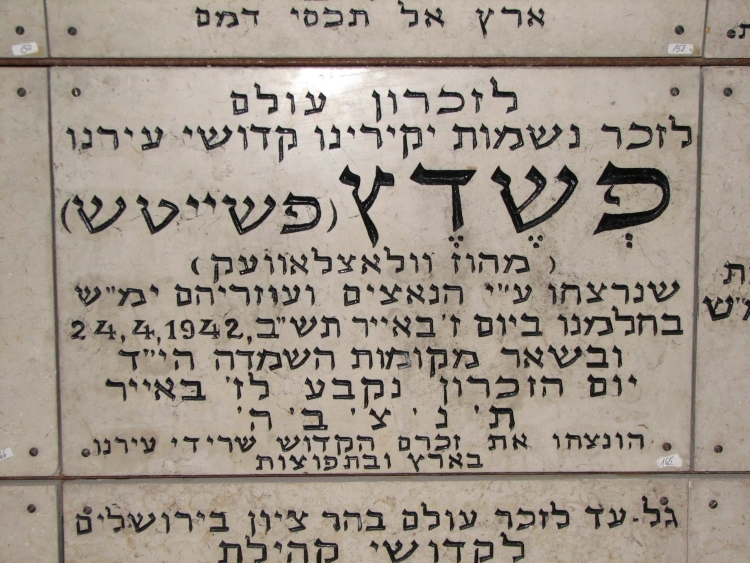

In eternal memory

In memory of the souls of our dear friends, the martyrs of our city
Przedecz (Pshaytsh)
(Włocławek district)
who were murdered by the Nazis and their collaborators, may their names be obliterated
in Chełmno on the 7th day of Iyar, [5]742 [Anno Mundi], 24 April 1942
and in the other places of extermination, may God avenge their blood
The memorial day was established as the 7th day of Iyar
May their lives be bound in the bundle of the living
Their holy memory immortalized by the survivors of our city

in Israel and in the Diaspora.

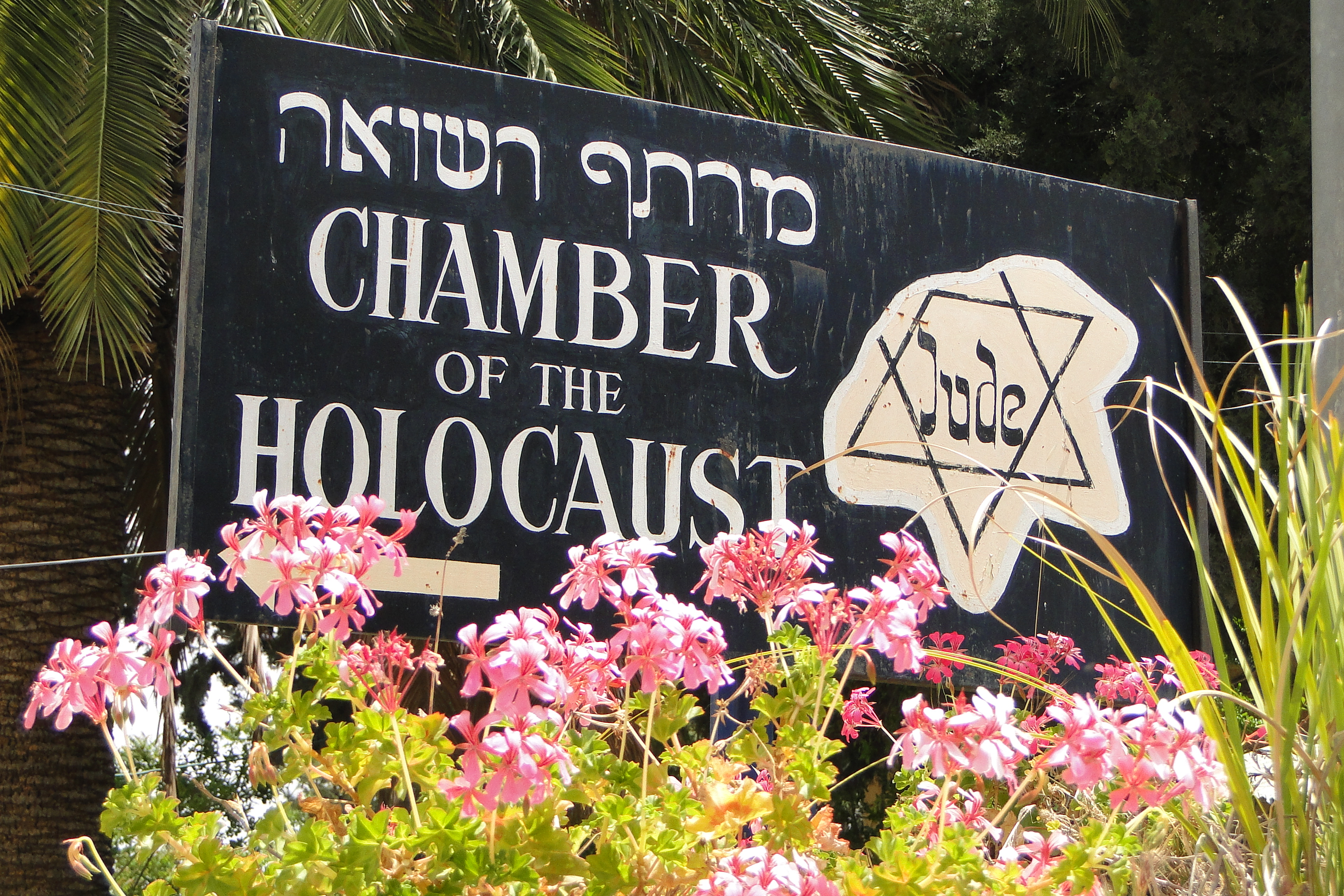

Many of the museum's exhibits display religious artifacts such as a bloodstained Torah scroll from Węgrów, Poland, and a handwritten prayer book from the Buchenwald concentration camp. Other exhibits include "purses, shoe soles, drums and wallets made from the parchments of Torah scrolls", a coat sewn from Torah parchments which was worn by a Nazi officer, a prisoner uniform from the Auschwitz concentration camp, and a recreation of the gas oven used in the crematoria of concentration camps. The museum also includes urns with the ashes of Holocaust victims from 36 Nazi death camps and "RIF" soap allegedly manufactured by the Nazis from human fat. There is also an exhibit on neo-Nazism with a selection of modern-day antisemitic literature.
