= Ukrainian Catholic Archiepiscopal Exarchate of Odesa =

Ukrainian Catholic missionary jurisdiction in south western Ukraine

Coordinates: 46.4667°N 30.7333°E

Archiepiscopal Exarchate of Odesa

Location
- Country: Ukraine
- Territory: Southern Ukraine
- Headquarters: Odesa, Ukraine

Information
- Sui iuris church: Ukrainian Greek Catholic
- Rite: Byzantine
- Established: July 28, 2003
- Cathedral: St. Andrew Ukrainian Catholic Cathedral in Odesa

Current leadership
- Pope: Leo XIV
- Major Archbishop: Sviatoslav Shevchuk
- Archiepiscopal Exarch: Mykhaylo Bubniy, C.Ss.R.

Map

The Ukrainian Catholic Archiepiscopal Exarchate of Odesa – Crimea was established on 11 January 2002 from the Archiepiscopal Exarchate of Kyiv – Vyshhorod (which has now become the Ukrainian Catholic Major Archeparchy of Kyiv–Galicia). It has been divided on 13 February 2014, in Ukrainian Catholic Archiepiscopal Exarchate of Odesa (Latin: Archiepiscopi Exarchatus Odessana) and Ukrainian Catholic Archiepiscopal Exarchate of Crimea. The only archiepiscopal exarch was Archbishop Vasyl Ivasiuk, now transferred transfer to the see of the eparchy of Kolomyia-Chernivtsi of the Ukrainians.

They are two of the only five archiepiscopal exarchates which exist in the world, all part of the particular Ukrainian Greek Catholic Church and following the Byzantine Ukrainian Rite.

== Status as Archiepiscopal Exarchate ==
As Major Archbishops have similar authority to that of Patriarchs, Archiepiscopal Exarchates similarly have roughly the same status in canon law as Patriarchal Exarchates.
