= Chodecz =

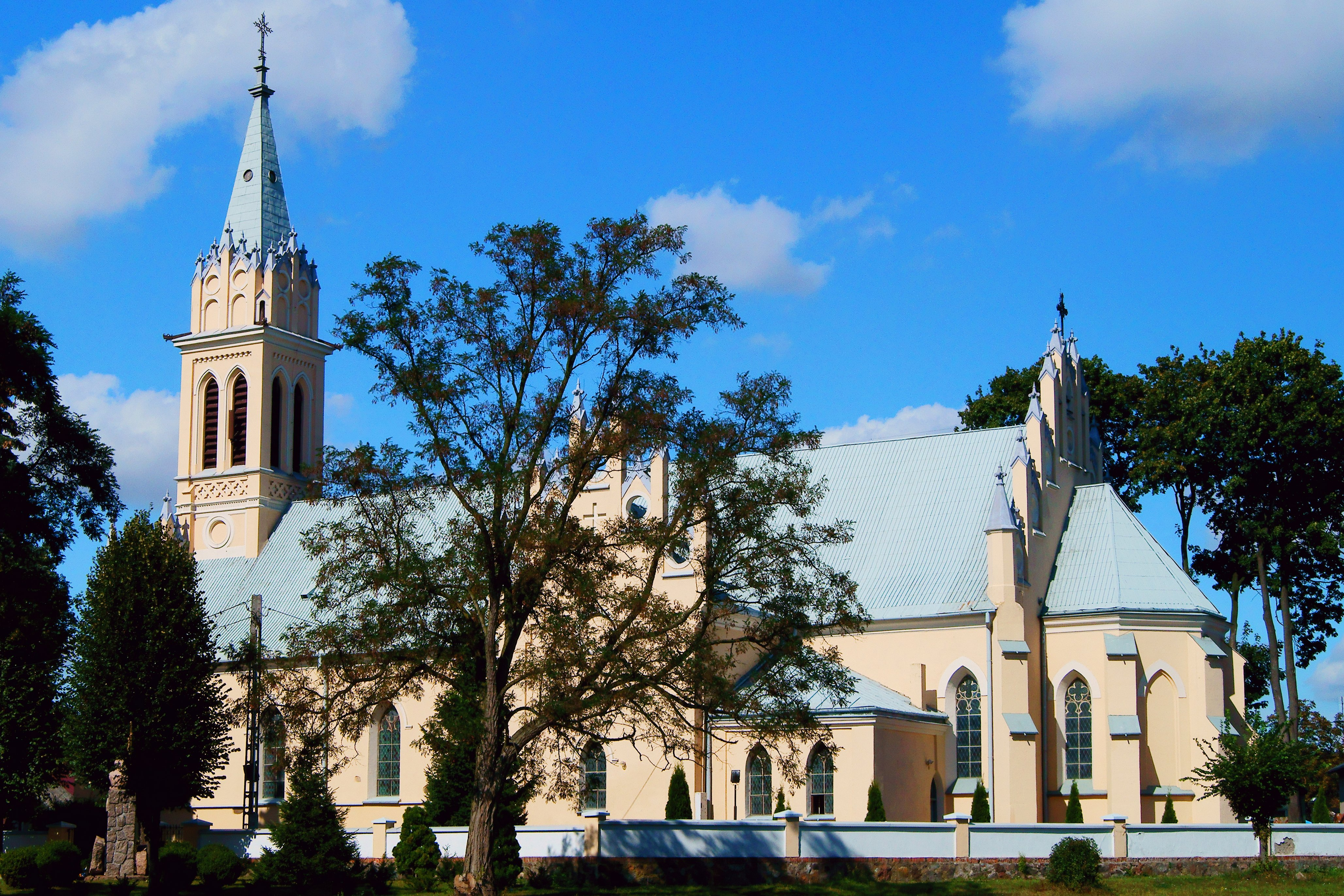
- Saint Dominic church in Chodecz

- Flag Coat of arms

- Location within Poland
- Coordinates: 52°24′N 19°02′E
- Country: Poland
- Voivodeship: Kuyavian-Pomeranian
- County: Włocławek
- Gmina: Chodecz
- Town rights: 1442-1800, 1822-1870, 1921

Government
  - Mayor: Jarosław Grabczyński

Area
  - Total: 1.39 km^{2} (0.54 sq mi)

Population (31 December 2021)
  - Total: 2,244
  - Density: 1,610/km^{2} (4,180/sq mi)
- Postal code: 87-860
- Area code: +48 54
- Vehicle registration: CWL
- Website: http://www.chodecz.pl

Chodecz [ˈxɔdɛt͡ʂ] is a town in Włocławek County in the Kuyavian-Pomeranian Voivodeship in central Poland. It is situated in the historic region of Kuyavia, midway between Lubień Kujawski and Przedecz. It is about 75 km (47 mi) north of Łódź, 150 km (93 mi) west of Warsaw and 28 km (17 mi) south of Włocławek. The southwest side of Chodecz borders on Lake Chodeckie. As of December 2021, the town has a population of 2,244.

== History ==
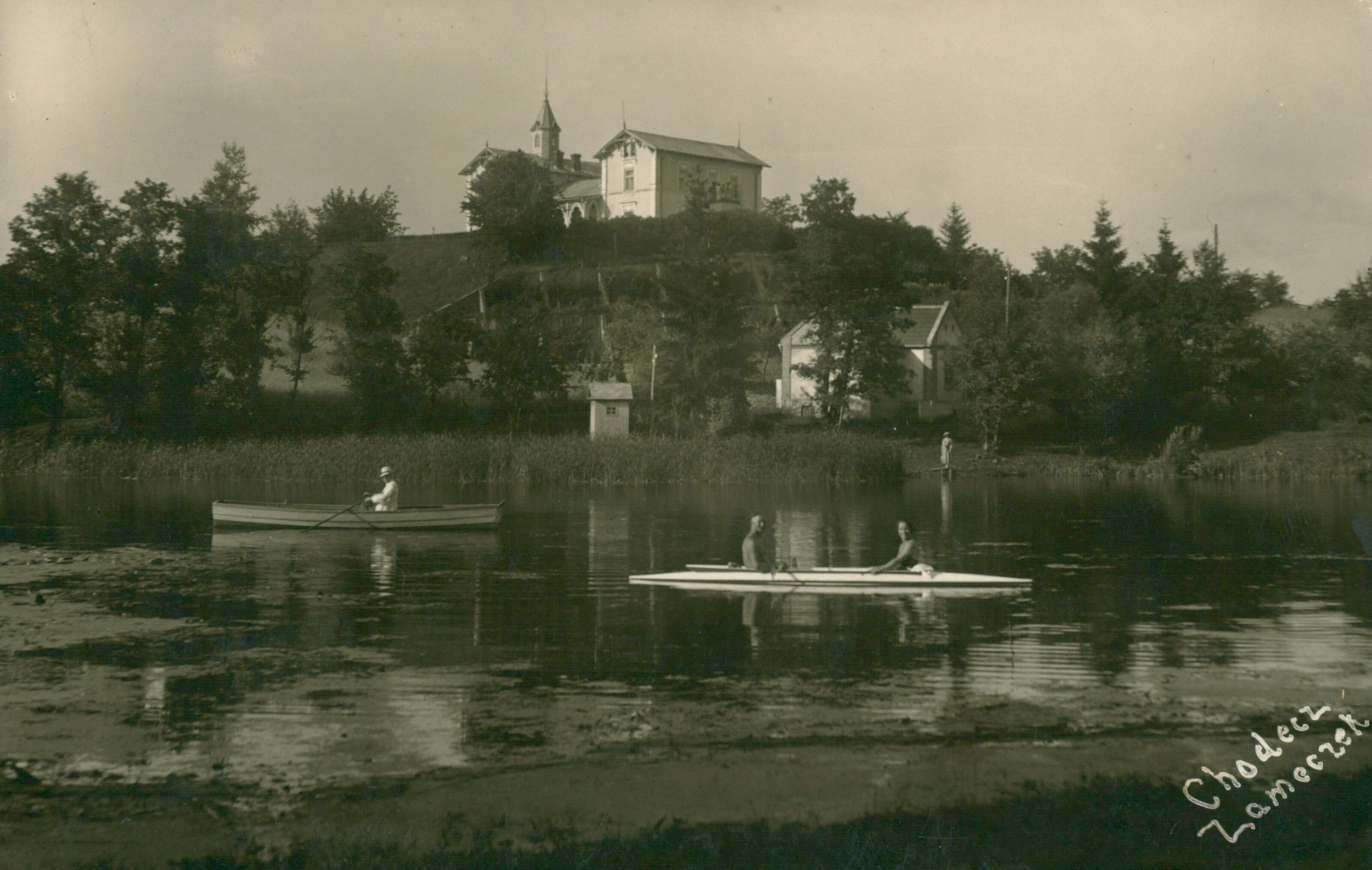
Chodecz in 1936

Chodecz was granted town rights in 1442. It was a private town, administratively located in the Przedecz County in the Brześć Kujawski Voivodeship in the Greater Poland Province of the Kingdom of Poland. In 1544 King Sigismund I the Old established four annual fairs in Chodecz, and in 1666 King John II Casimir Vasa established a fifth fair.

Following the Third Partition of Poland in 1795, the town was annexed by Prussia. After 1800 town rights were revoked. In 1807, Chodecz was regained by Poles and included in the short-lived Duchy of Warsaw. After the duchy's dissolution in 1815, the town passed to the Russian Partition of Poland. In 1822, town rights were restored, although they were once again revoked in 1870 as punishment for the unsuccessful Polish January Uprising. In 1918, Poland regained independence and control of Chodecz. In 1921, town rights were restored.

During the German occupation (World War II), the town was renamed Godetz.

== Demographics ==
Detailed data as of 31 December 2021:

Description	All		Women		Men	
Unit	person	percentage	person	percentage	person	percentage
Population	2244	100	1169	52.1%	1075	47.9%
Population density	1614.4		841.0		773.4	

=== Number of inhabitants by year ===
Historical population

Year	Pop.	±%
1921	1,685	—
1931	1,824	+8.2%
1946	1,551	−15.0%
1995	1,899	+22.4%
2000	1,960	+3.2%

Year	Pop.	±%
2005	1,953	−0.4%
2010	1,927	−1.3%
2015	1,896	−1.6%
2020	1,826	−3.7%

== Sights ==
- Gothic Revival Saint Dominic church from 1849 to 1850, Gothic Revival
- Cemetery with the late Baroque St. James Chapel from 1799, columbarium and the house brothers hospital
- Monument to Tadeusz Kościuszko at the main square

== Transport ==
Chodecz lies along voivodeship road 269 which connects it to Kowal to the north-east and to Sompolno to the west.

The nearest railway station is Kaliska Kujawskie.
