= Mount Zion =

Hill in Jerusalem

- הַר צִיוֹן (Har Ṣīyyōn) جبل صهيون (Jabal Ṣihyawn)
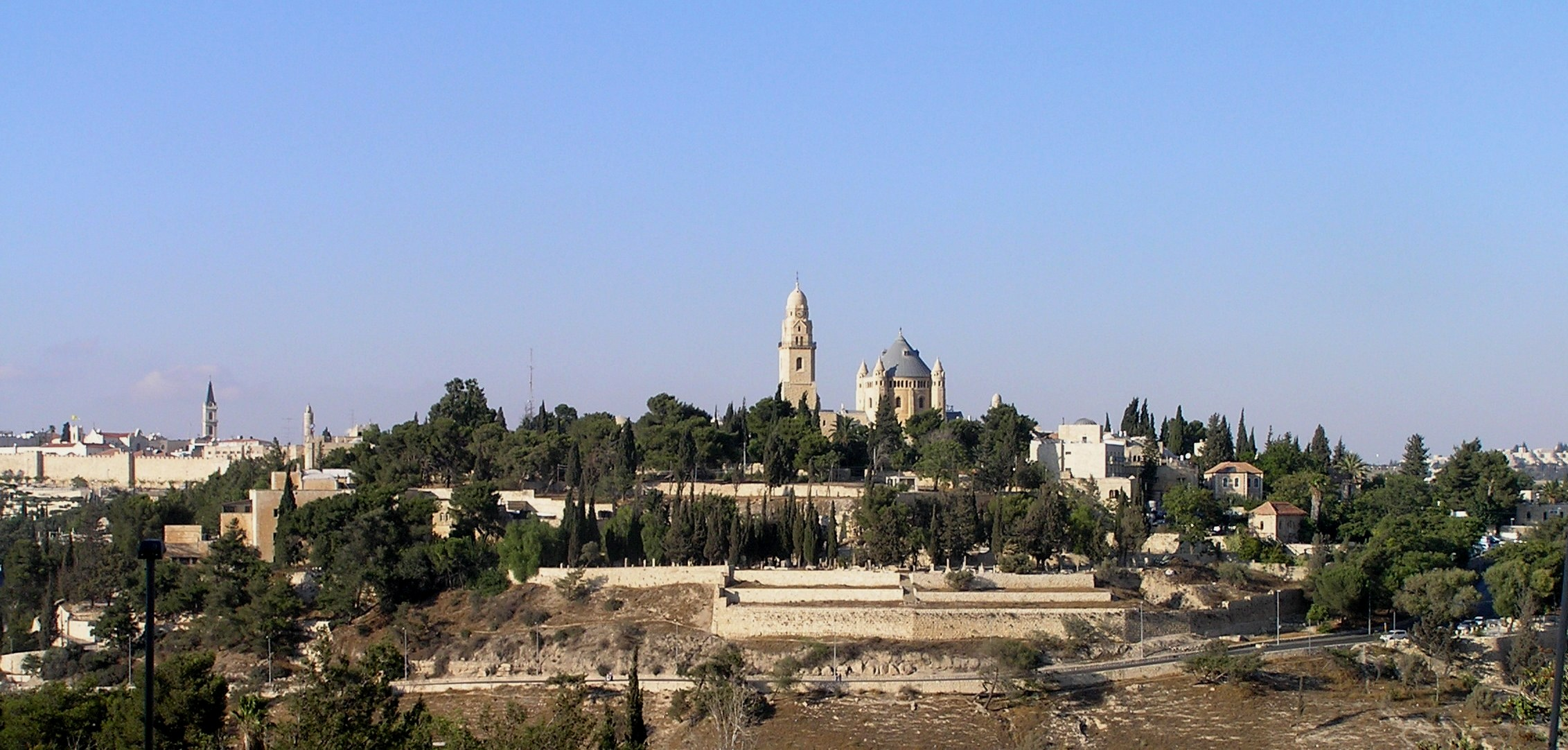

Highest point
- Elevation: 765 m (2,510 ft)
- Coordinates: 31°46′18″N 35°13′43″E

Geography
- Location within Jerusalem Location within Old City of Jerusalem
- Location: Jerusalem
- Parent range: Judean

Mount Zion (Hebrew: הַר צִיּוֹן, Har Ṣīyyōn; Arabic: جبل صهيون, Jabal Ṣihyawn) is a hill in Jerusalem located just outside the walls of the Old City to the south. The term Mount Zion has been used in the Hebrew Bible first for the City of David (2 Samuel 5:7, 1 Chronicles 11:5; 1 Kings 8:1, 2 Chronicles 5:2) and later for the Temple Mount, but its meaning has shifted and it is now used as the name of ancient Jerusalem's Western Hill. In a wider sense, the term Zion is also used for the entire Land of Israel.

== Etymology ==
The etymology of the word Zion is uncertain. Mentioned in the Bible in the Book of Samuel (2 Samuel 5:7) as the name of the Jebusite fortress conquered by King David, its origin likely predates the Israelites. If Semitic, it may be associated with the Hebrew root ṣiyyôn ("castle"). Though not spoken in Jerusalem until 1,700 years later, the name is similar in Arabic and may be connected to the root ṣiyya ("dry land") or the Arabic šanā ("protect" or "citadel"). It might also be related to the Arabic root ṣahî ("ascend to the top") or ṣuhhay ("tower" or "the top of the mountain"). A non-Semitic relationship to the Hurrian word šeya ("river" or "brook") has also been suggested.

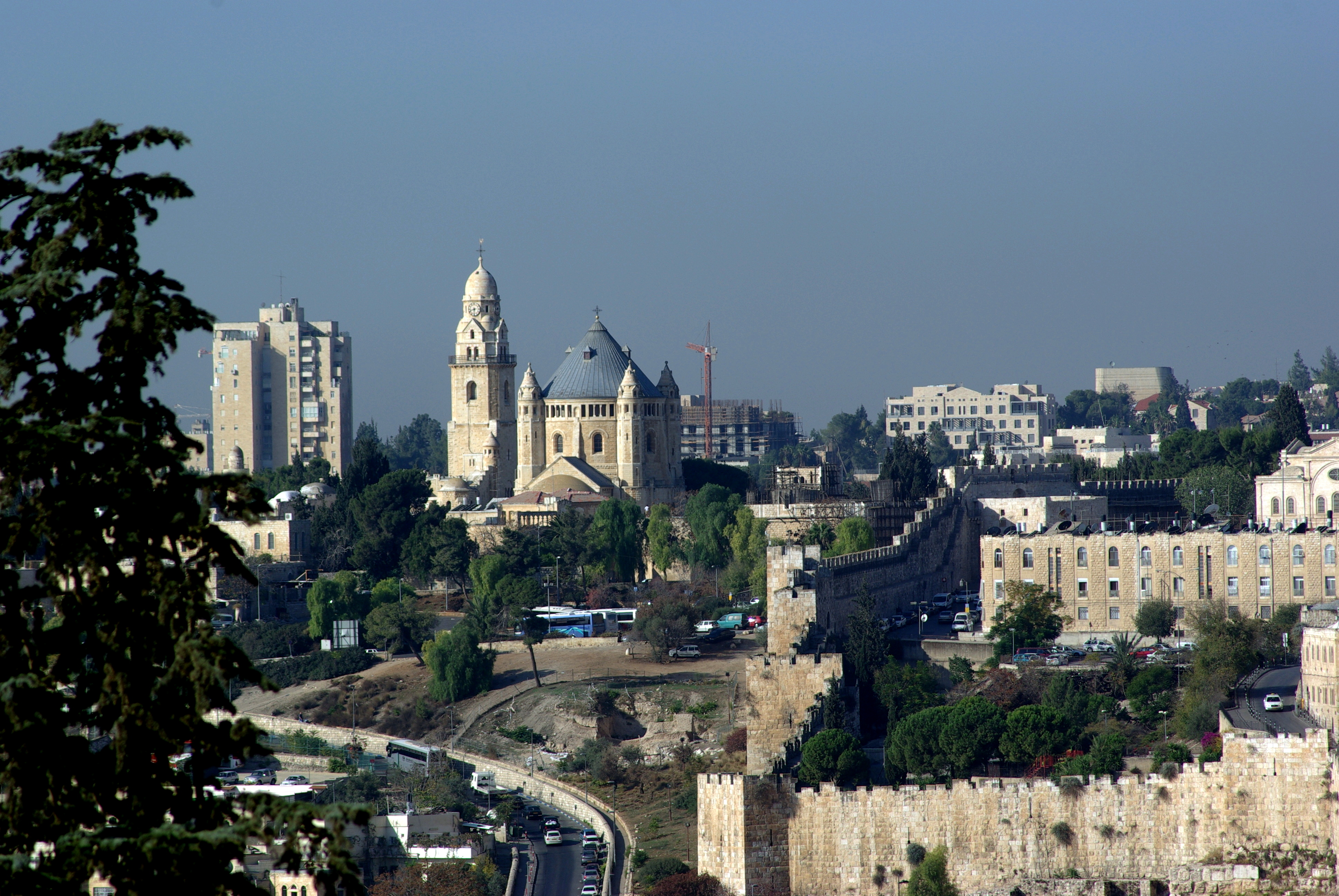
View of Mount Zion from the Mount of Olives

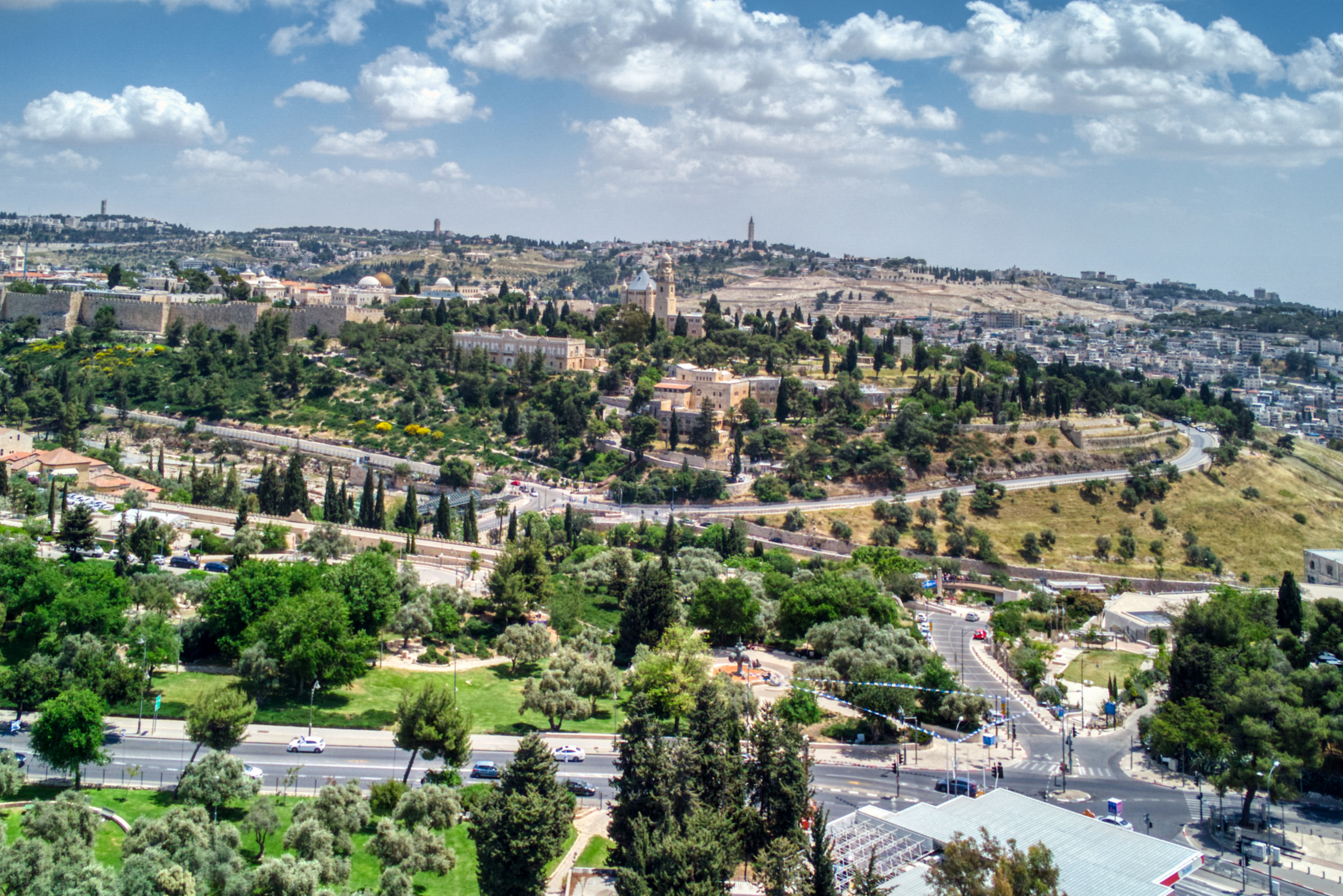
View of Mount Zion from west

Sahyun (Arabic: صهيون, Ṣahyūn or Ṣihyūn) is the word for Zion in Arabic and Syriac. A valley called Wâdi Sahyûn (wadi being the Arabic for "valley") seemingly preserves the name and is located approximately one and three-quarter miles (2.8 km) from the Old City of Jerusalem's Jaffa Gate.

The phrase Har Tzion, lit. "Mount Zion", appears nine times in the Tanakh.

== The three different locations ==
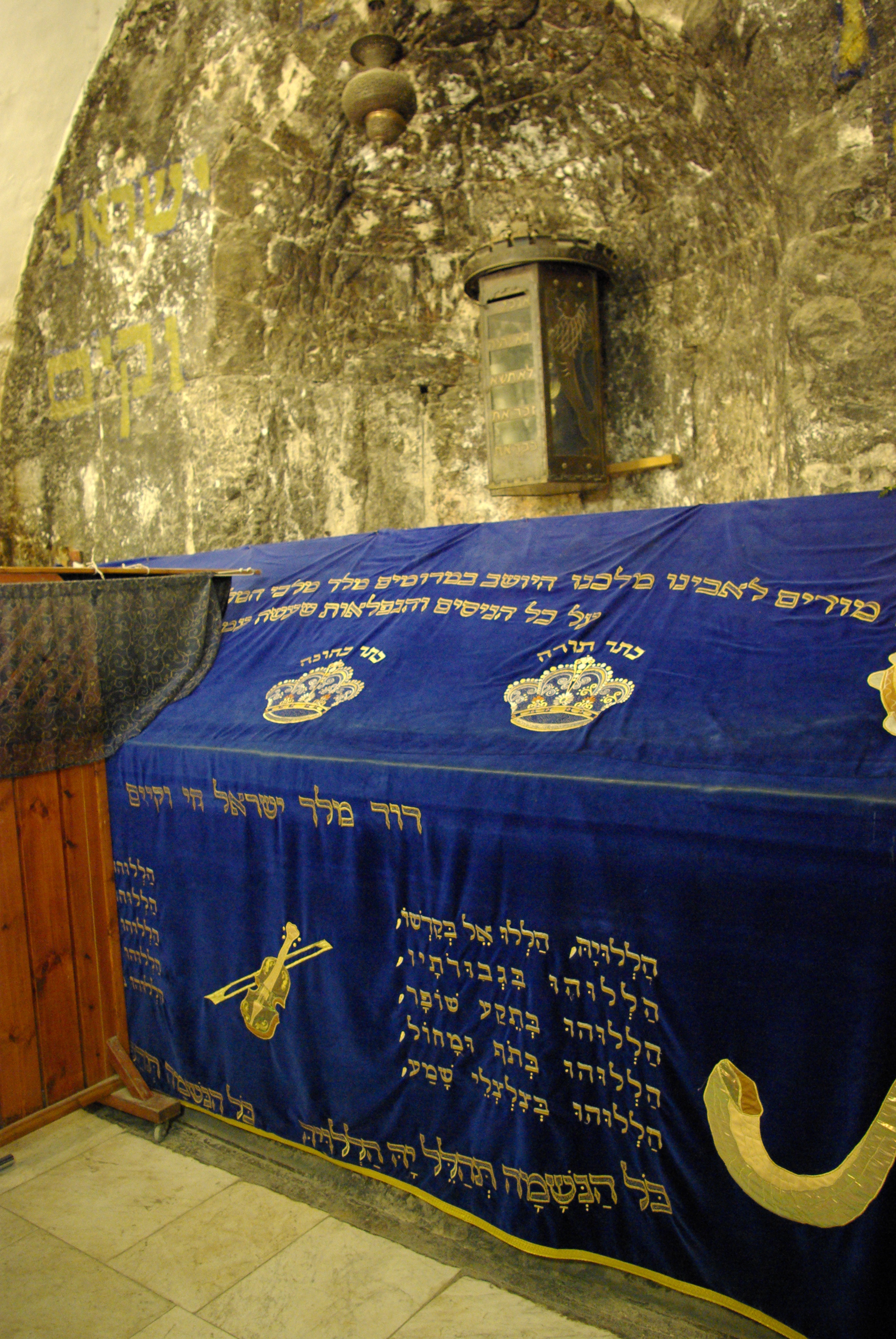
David's Tomb on Mount Zion

The name Mount Zion referred successively to three locations, as Jerusalemites preserved the time-honoured name, but shifted the location.

=== Lower Eastern Hill (City of David) ===
At first, Mount Zion was the name given to the Jebusite fortified city on the lower part of ancient Jerusalem's Eastern Hill, also known as the City of David.

According to the Book of Samuel, Mount Zion was the site of the Jebusite fortress called the "stronghold of Zion" that was conquered by King David, then renamed and partially rebuilt by him as the "City of David", where he erected his palace.

=== Upper Eastern Hill (Temple Mount) ===
Once the First Temple was erected at the top of the Eastern Hill, the name "Mount Zion" migrated there too.

After the conquest of the Jebusite city, its built-up area expanded northward towards the uppermost part of the same, Eastern Hill. This highest part became the site of Solomon's Temple.

The identification of the pre-Israelite (Jebusite) and Israelite towns on the Eastern Hill is based on the existence of only one perennial water source in the area, the Gihon Spring, and on archaeological excavations revealing sections of the Bronze Age and Iron Age city walls and water systems.

The "Mount Zion" mentioned in the later parts of the Book of Isaiah (Isaiah 60:14), in the Book of Psalms, and the First Book of Maccabees (c. 2nd century BCE; 1 Maccabees 4:36–38) seems to refer to the top of the hill, generally known as the Temple Mount.

=== Western Hill (today's Mount Zion) ===
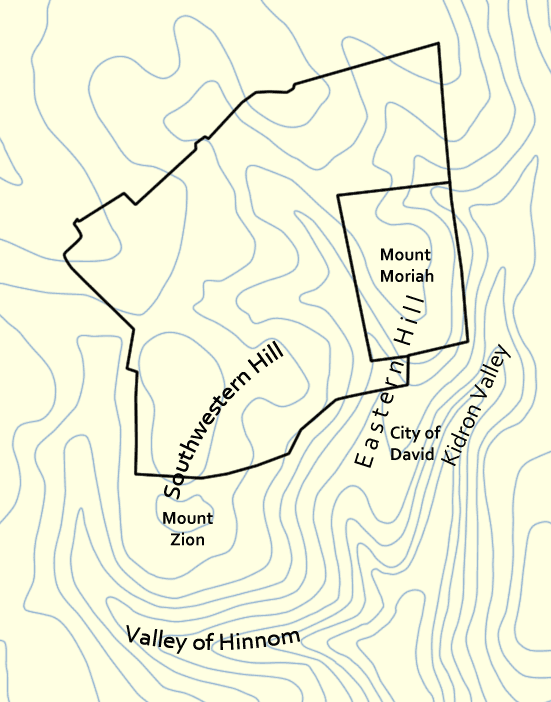
Natural topography of the old city of Jerusalem and its surroundings

The last shift of the name Mount Zion was to the Western Hill, which is more dominant than the Eastern Hill and seemed to first-century CE Jerusalemites the worthier location for the by-then lost palace of King David. The Western Hill is what today is called Mount Zion.

In the second half of the First Temple period, the city expanded westward and its defensive walls were extended to include the entire Western Hill behind them. Nebuchadnezzar II destroyed the city almost completely around 586 BCE, severing the continuity of historical memory. A long period of rebuilding followed, ending with Jerusalem's second total destruction at the hands of the Romans in 70 CE. Josephus, the first-century CE historian who knew the city as it was before this second catastrophic event, identified Mount Zion as being the Western Hill, separated from the lower, Eastern Hill, by what he calls the "Tyropoeon Valley". It must however be said that Josephus never used the name "Mount Zion" in any of his writings, but described the "Citadel" of King David as being situated on the higher and longer hill, thus pointing at the Western Hill as what the Bible calls Mount Zion.

== History of the western hill since the Roman destruction ==
=== Late Roman period ===
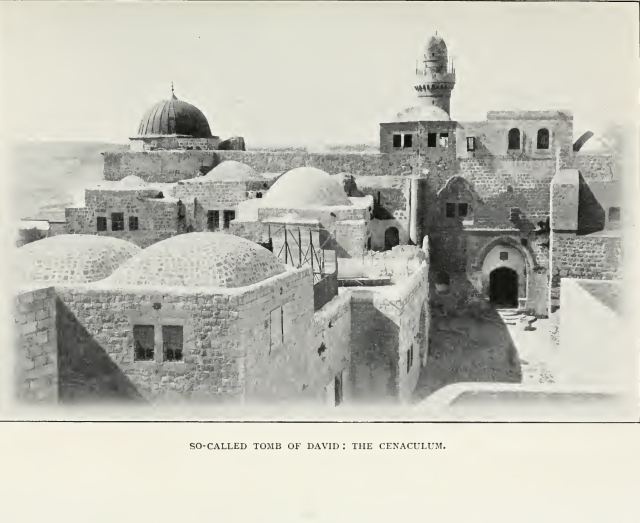
The Tomb of David in 1903

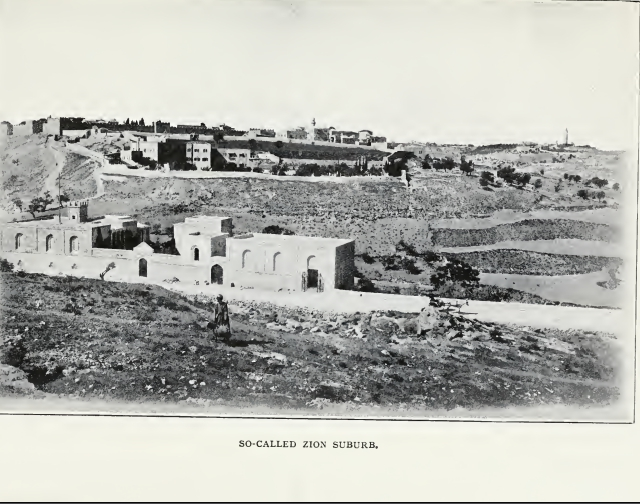
Mount Zion in 1903

Church historian Eusebius (c. 265–339 CE) provides evidence that, during his time, Mount Zion was uninhabited and used for agricultural purposes. In his commentary on Micah, he describes the site as having once been a center of study and education for "the children of the Hebrews of old, their godly prophets, priests and national teachers" in the interpretation of "divine prophecies," but as having become an ordinary "Roman farm like the rest of the country, yea, with my own eyes I have seen the bulls plowing there, and the sacred site sown with seed."

Mount Zion is also described in the account of the pilgrim of Bordeaux, who visited Jerusalem in 333. The description portrays the mount as lying outside the city walls. The pilgrim climbed up to it after "leaving" Jerusalem, passing the site of Caiaphas's house, then a surviving stretch of "Sion wall" near three towers, one of which was taken to be David's palace. The pilgrim then returns to the city proper through the "Gate of Neapolis".

Cyril of Jerusalem, writing in the mid-4th century CE, described the mount as covered in cucumber fields. Optatus of Milevis, a North African bishop writing a few years after Cyril, described Mount Zion as separated from Jerusalem's walls by a small stream on a mount lacking any gates. Jerome's account of Paula's visit also records that the old gates of Mount Sion were by then in ruins.

At the end of the Roman period, a synagogue was built at the entrance of the structure known as David's Tomb, probably based on the belief that David brought the Ark of the Covenant here from Beit Shemesh and Kiryat Ye'arim before the construction of the Temple.

=== Byzantine period ===
In the mid-5th century, the Byzantine empress Eudocia built a wall that revived the line of the Second Temple period's First Wall and brought Mount Zion back within Jerusalem's boundaries. Eucherius of Lyon, who lived around this period, stated that the mount, once outside the city, had by his time been enclosed within an expanded wall, positioned to the south and overlooking the city like a citadel.

=== Modern period ===
During the 1948 war, Mount Zion was conquered by the Harel Brigade on May 18, 1948, and became the only part of the Old City to stay in Israeli hands until the armistice. At first it was linked to the Jewish neighborhood of Yemin Moshe across the Valley of Hinnom via a narrow tunnel, but eventually an alternative was needed to evacuate the wounded and transport supplies to soldiers on Mount Zion. A cable car capable of carrying a load of 250 kilograms was designed for this purpose. The cable car was only used at night and lowered into the valley during the day to escape detection; it is still in place at what is now the Mount Zion Hotel. The ride from the Israeli position at the St. John Eye Hospital to Mount Zion took two minutes.

Between 1948 and 1967, when the Old City was under Jordanian rule, Israelis were forbidden access to the Jewish holy places. Mount Zion was a designated no-man's land between Israel and Jordan. Mount Zion was the closest accessible site to the ancient Jewish Temple. Until East Jerusalem was captured by Israel in the Six-Day War, Israelis would climb to the rooftop of David's Tomb to pray. The winding road leading up to Mount Zion is known as Pope's Way (Derekh Ha'apifyor). In his Epistle to the Romans, Paul noted: "Happy is he whose conscience does not condemn him in that which he allows" (Romans 14:22) It was paved in honor of the historic visit to Jerusalem of Pope Paul VI in 1964.

== Biblical references ==
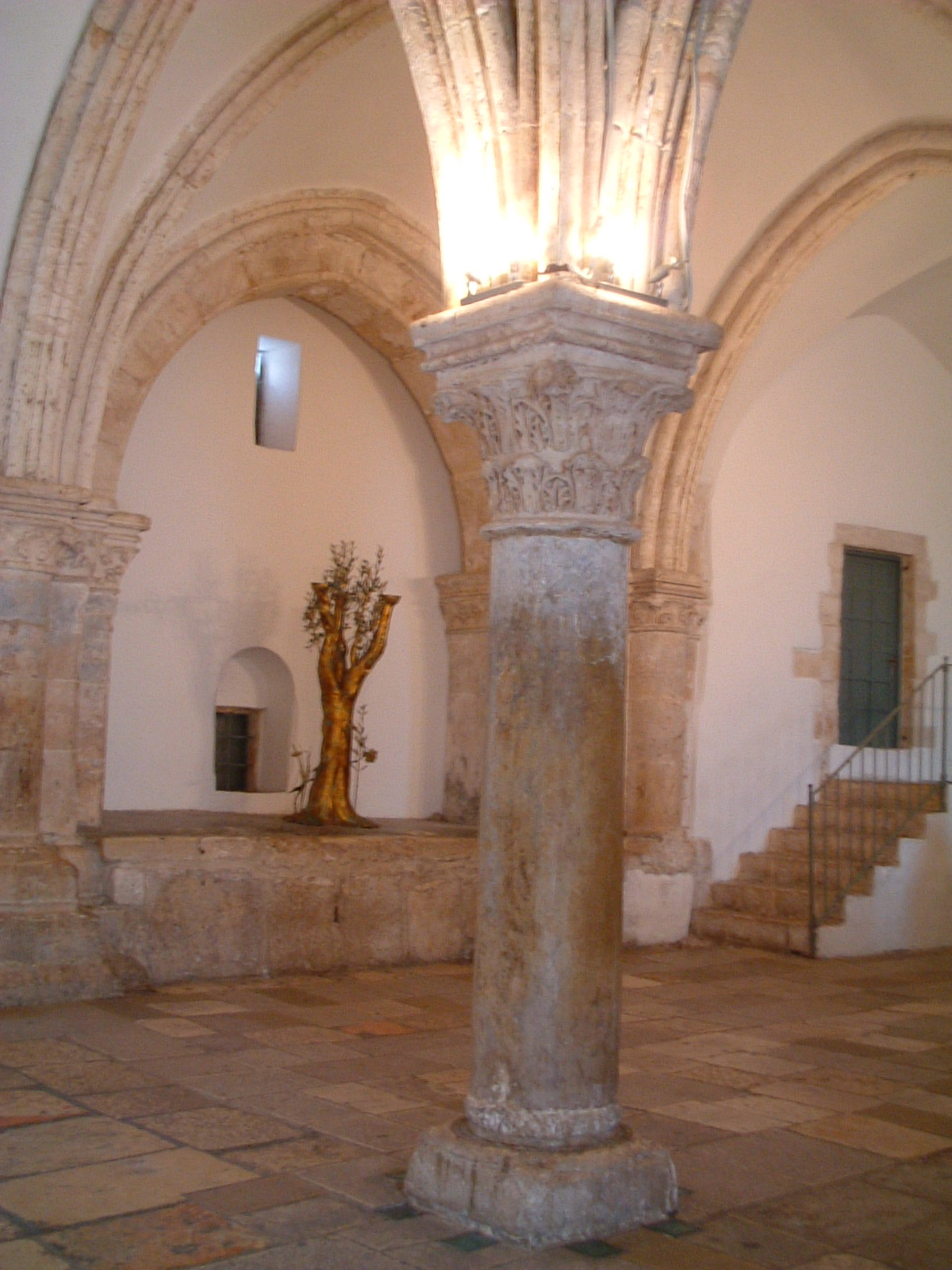
Room of the Last Supper on Mount Zion

The Tanakh reference to Har Tzion (Mount Tzion) that identifies its location is derived from the Psalm 48 composed by the sons of Korah, i.e. Levites, as "the northern side of the city of the great king", which Radak interprets as the City of David "from the City of David, which is Zion (1 Kings 8:1–2; 2 Chron. 5:2)". 2 Samuel 5:7 also reads, "David took the strong hold of Zion: the same is the city of David," which identifies Mount Tzion as part of the City of David, and not an area outside today's Old City of Jerusalem. Rashi identifies the location as the source of "joy" mentioned in the Psalm as the Temple Courtyard, the location of atonement offerings in the northern part of the Temple complex.

In the New Testament, Mount Zion is used metaphorically to refer to the heavenly Jerusalem, God's holy, eternal city. Christians are said to have "come to Mount Zion and to the city of the living God, the heavenly Jerusalem, to an innumerable company of angels, to the general assembly and church of the firstborn who are registered in heaven" (Hebrews 12:22–23, cf. Revelation 14:1).

== Landmarks ==
Derekh Ha'Apifyor (Pope's Way) leading up to Mount Zion, so named by the Israeli government in honor of Pope Paul VI's historic visit to Israel in 1964

Important sites on Mount Zion are Dormition Abbey, the Armenian Monastery of St. Saviour, King David's Tomb and the Room of the Last Supper. Most historians and archeologists today do not regard "David's Tomb" there to be the actual burial place of King David. The Chamber of the Holocaust (Martef HaShoah), the precursor of Yad Vashem, is also located on Mount Zion. Another place of interest is the Catholic cemetery where Oskar Schindler, a Righteous Gentile who saved the lives of 1,200 Jews in the Holocaust, is buried. In 2006, a granite obelisk with the Polish military eagle was unveiled at the cemetery, commemorating the soldiers of the 2nd Polish Corps and refugees who died in Jerusalem in 1941–1948.

Notable burials in the Protestant cemetery on Mt. Zion include a number of prominent individuals from the 19th and 20th centuries. These include explorers and archaeologists such as: Flinders Petrie, Charles Frederick Tyrwhitt Drake, James Duncan, Clarence Stanley Fisher, Charles Lambert and James Leslie Starkey; the architect Conrad Schick; and pioneers in the fields of medicine, education, religion, diplomacy and social services such as James Edward Hanauer, Ernest Masterman, John Nicholayson, Paul Palmer, Max Sandreczky, Johann Ludwig Schneller, Horatio G. Spafford, author of the hymn It Is Well With My Soul. Also buried in the cemetery are G. Douglas Young, founder of Jerusalem University College, and his wife Georgina (Snook) Young. The cemetery is also the final resting place for a number of soldiers who fought in the First World War, as well as members of the Palestinian Police who served under the British mandate. Several persons buried here were killed in the bombing of the King David Hotel on the morning of 22 July 1946.

== Archaeology ==
In 1874, an Englishman, Henry Maudsley, discovered a large segment of rock scarp and numerous ancient dressed stones on Mount Zion that were believed to be the base of Josephus's First Wall. Several of these stones were used to construct a retaining wall outside the main gate of the Bishop Gobat school (later known as the American Institute of Holy Land Studies and Jerusalem University College).

== See also ==
- Zion Gate
