= Torkom =

Torkom is an Armenian given name.

Togarmah is ancestor of the peoples of the South Caucasus and father of Hayk, the legendary patriarch and founder of the Armenian nation

Torkom may refer to:

- Torkom Koushagian of Jerusalem, Armenian Patriarch of Jerusalem from 1929 to 1939.
- Torkom Manoogian (1919-2012), Armenian primate in the United States, and later Armenian Patriarch of Jerusalem from 1990 to 2012
- Torkom Saraydarian (1917–1997) Spiritual writer, teacher and lecturer versed in the Teachings of the Ancient Wisdom
