= Mutafyan =

Mutafyan or Mutafian is a surname. Notable people with the surname include:

- Mesrob II Mutafyan of Constantinople (born 1956), 84th Armenian Patriarch of Constantinople
- Claude Mutafian (born 1942), French-Armenian mathematician and historian
- Zareh Mutafian (1907-1980), French-Armenian painter
