= Mardik =

Mardik, also spelt Mardig, is an Armenian given name. Notable people with the name include:

- Mardik Tchaparian, Lebanese footballer of Armenian descent
- Mardik Martin (1934–2019), American screenwriter of Armenian descent
- Mardik Mardikian (born 1992), Syrian footballer of Armenian descent

== See also ==
- Mardikian, surname derived from the name
- Mardigian Museum of Armenian Art and Culture, museum in Jerusalem
- Aurora Mardiganian (1901–1994), Armenian American actress
