= Yeghishe Tourian of Jerusalem =

Armenian Patriarch

Yeghishe Tourian of Jerusalem KBE
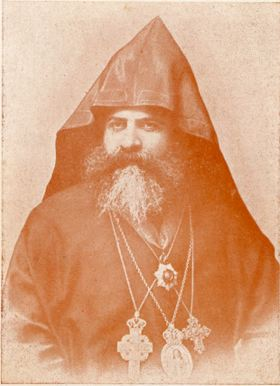

Personal life
- Born: Mihran Tourian; 23 February 1860 Üsküdar, Ottoman Empire
- Died: 27 April 1930 (aged 70)

Religious life
- Religion: Christianity

Yeghishe Tourian KBE (also Turian; Armenian: Եղիշէ Դուրեան; 23 February 1860 – 27 April 1930) was Armenian Patriarch of Jerusalem from 1921 to 1929. He took over the position after the patriarchate position remained vacant for 11 years (1910–1921).

== Biography ==
Born in Üsküdar on the Asia side of the Bosporus as Mihran Tourian, he was the younger brother of Armenian poet and playwright Bedros Tourian. He was a staunch believer in education. In Constantinople, he published a series of textbooks for the teaching of Armenian (Ընթացք ի գրոց բարբառ), with first volume in 1880 and second volume in 1883, Select Sayings of Noted Foreigners (Ընտիր ասացվածք օտարազգի նշանավոր անձանց, 1882), History of Armenian Literature (Պատմություն հայ մատենագրության, 1885). In 1909 he published his poems, and regularly contributed to Armenian Studies in various publication under the nom de plume Hovvakan Sring ('Pastoral Reed').

He was the Armenian Patriarch of Constantinople from 1909–10. He later moved to Jerusalem where he was consecrated as Patriarch. He engaged in vast educational reform and in 1925, established a unified elementary school to accommodate the growing number of children in the community. He also modernized the curriculum of the Armenian Seminary and acquiring highly qualified instructors from the cadre of talented teachers and educators who had come to Jerusalem as refugees after the Armenian genocide. In 1929, the unified elementary school officially opened its doors. By consolidating disparate locations, including the St. Gayane Girls' School, this new elementary school became the primary Armenian co-educational institution in the Holy Land and was renamed the School of the Holy Translators (in Armenian Srbots Targmanchats Varzharan).

Starting 1927, he resumed the publication of Sion, the official organ of the Patriarchate of Jerusalem. His collections and writings were published in Jerusalem in a multi-volume series by "Matenashar Tourian" dedicated to his name. It also contained some of his poems under the title Holy Lyre (Srpazan Knar).

He was appointed honorary Knight Commander of the Order of the British Empire (KBE) in the British 1930 New Year Honours.

Torkom Koushagian wrote a lengthy study about his legacy first in a series in Cairo Armenian daily Arev and later in a separate publication in Jerusalem.

Tourian was succeeded as patriarch by Torkom Koushagian.

Armenian Apostolic Church titles
| Preceded by Harootiun Vehabedian | Armenian Patriarch of Jerusalem; 1921–1929 | Succeeded by Torkom Koushagian |
| Preceded by Malachia Ormanian | Armenian Patriarch of Constantinople; 1909–1910 | Succeeded by Hovhannes Arscharouni |
