= SNTR =

SNTR may refer to:

- Sixpence None the Richer, an American Christian rock/pop band
- St. Nersess Theological Review, an annual Armenological publication established by St. Nersess Armenian Seminary
