= Martiros of Crimea =

Armenian writer, poet, historian, and priest

- Born: Martiros Ghrimetsi
- Occupations: Writer, poet, historian and a priest

Martiros of Crimea or Martiros Ghrimetsi (Armenian: Մարտիրոս Ղրիմեցի) was an Armenian writer, poet, historian and a priest of the 17th century.

Martiros held the post of Patriarch of Constantinople from 1659 to 1660; he was also Armenian Patriarchate of Jerusalem from 1677–1680.

Martiros of Crimea has left a number of poems, which are considered to be a part of the Armenian cultural heritage. He has also written a book about the history of the Armenians in Crimea, which is a significant historical source. He is well known for his satirical work.

== See also ==
- List of ecumenical patriarchs of Constantinople
- List of Armenian patriarchs of Jerusalem

Religious titles
Preceded by Parthenius IV	Armenian Patriarch of Constantinople; 1659–1660	Succeeded by Dionysius III of Constantinople
Preceded by Yeghiazar Hromglayetzee	Armenian Patriarch of Jerusalem; 1677–1680	Succeeded by Hovhannes VII Amasyatzee
