= Guregh Israelian of Jerusalem =

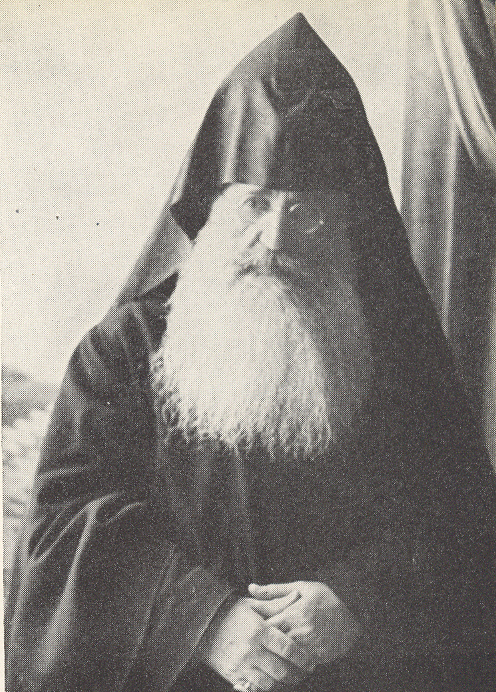
Patriarch Guregh Israelian, May 1948

Patriarch Guregh Israelian (Armenian: Կիւրեղ Իսրայէլեան) (6 January 1894 – 28 October 1949) was Armenian Patriarch of Jerusalem serving the Armenian Patriarchate of Jerusalem from 1944 to 1949, succeeding Patriarch Mesrob Nishanian who had served from 1939 to 1944.

He was born Dikran Israelian in New Julfa, Persia. He was ordained deacon in December 1921 and celibate priest (taking the name Guregh) in July 1923. In July 1944 the Brotherhood of St James elected him as locum tenens of the Patriarchate of Jerusalem after the death of Patriarch Mesrob. He was elected Patriarch in October 1944. He was finally consecrated bishop in Echmiadzin on 1 July 1945, becoming an archbishop on 16 July 1945. He was installed as Patriarch in the Cathedral of St James on 6 December 1945 after the British King George VI had given the necessary assent.

He died in Beirut shortly after an operation.

Upon his death in 1949, the position of Patriarch of Jerusalem remained vacant for more than a decade, i.e. from 1949 to 1957 and from 1958 to 1960, with a very brief period when Tiran Nersoyan was elected as patriarch of Jerusalem (1957–1958), but was never consecrated.

Only in 1960 was a new Armenian Patriarch of Jerusalem officially elected, namely Patriarch Yeghishe Derderian. Earlier since 1949, Derderian was serving as deputy patriarch.

Religious titles
Preceded by Mesrob Nishanian	Armenian Patriarch of Jerusalem; 1944–1949	Succeeded by Vacant (1949–1957) followed by Tiran Nersoyan
