= Mesrob Nishanian of Jerusalem =

Armenian Patriarch of Jerusalem from 1939 to 1944

Patriarch Mesrob Nishanian (in Armenian Մեսրոպ Նիշանեան) (30 September 1872 – 26 July 1944) was Armenian Patriarch of Jerusalem serving the Armenian Patriarchate of Jerusalem from 1939 to 1944. He took over the position after Patriarch Torkom Koushagian.

He was born Mirijan Nishanian in Constantinople in 1872. After studies in Jerusalem he was ordained priest. On 20 September 1922 he was consecrated bishop. He was elected Patriarch of Jerusalem on 19 April 1939.

He was succeeded in 1944 by Patriarch Guregh Israelian.

Religious titles
Preceded by Torkom Koushagian	Armenian Patriarch of Jerusalem; 1939–1944	Succeeded by Guregh Israelian
