= Bonaparte Visiting the Plague Victims of Jaffa =

1804 painting by Antoine-Jean Gros

- Bonaparte visitant les pestiférés de Jaffa (French)
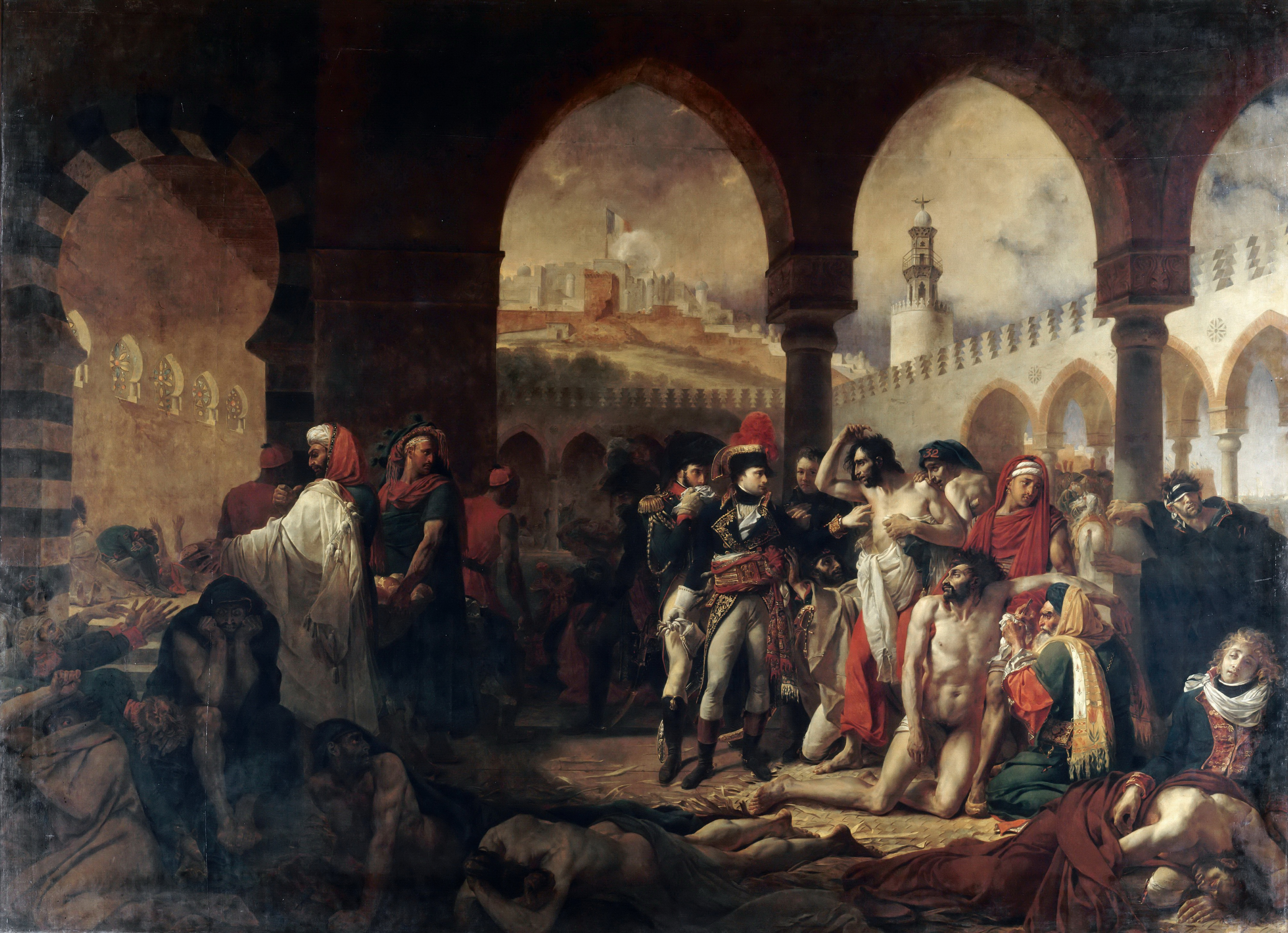
- Artist: Antoine-Jean Gros
- Year: 1804
- Medium: Oil on canvas
- Dimensions: 532 cm × 720 cm (209 in × 280 in)
- Location: Museum of Fine Arts, Boston

Bonaparte Visits the Plague Victims of Jaffa (French: Bonaparte visitant les pestiférés de Jaffa) is a propagandistic, oil-on-canvas painting commissioned by Napoleon and painted in 1804 by Antoine-Jean Gros, portraying an event during the French invasion of Egypt and Syria. The scene shows Napoleon during an event which is supposed to have occurred in Jaffa on 11 March 1799, depicting him making a visit to ill French soldiers at the Saint Nicholas Monastery.

Napoleon commissioned the painting in an attempt to embroider his mythology and quell reports that he had ordered fifty plague victims in Jaffa be given fatal doses of opium during his retreat from Syria. It also served a propaganda purpose in countering reports of French atrocities during their siege of Jaffa. On 18 September 1804, the painting was exhibited at the Académie des Beaux-Arts' Salon, between Napoleon's proclamation as emperor on 18 May and his coronation at the Notre-Dame de Paris on 2 December. Dominique Vivant Denon, who participated in the invasion of Egypt and Syria before serving as director of the Louvre, advised Gros when he executed the painting, which now forms part of the Louvre's collection of French art.

== Ahistoricity ==
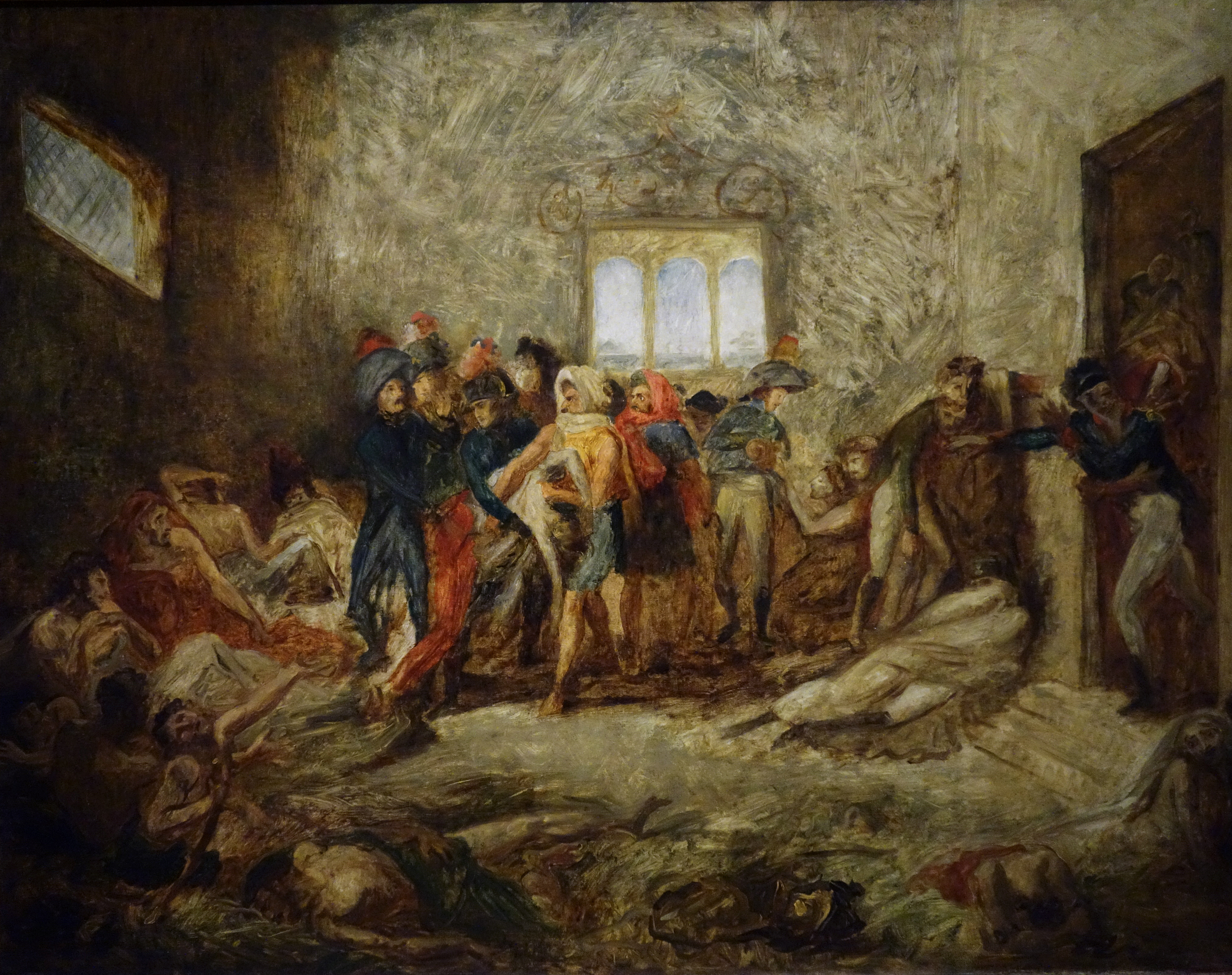
One of Gros's preliminary sketches for Bonaparte Visiting the Plague Victims of Jaffa (New Orleans Museum of Art)

The painting was ordered by the state after Napoleon had become emperor, and it had a clear propaganda purpose. As for eyewitnesses, in General Berthier's campaign report there is no mention about such an event. Bourrienne, Bonaparte's private secretary, wrote only that the general crossed the lazaretto at a fast pace. However, Dr. René-Nicolas Desgenettes (present in the painting between Napoleon and the patient with the raised arm) wrote that Bonaparte grabbed the sick and helped to transport them, possibly for the sake of mythology, as it was then believed that plague could be transmitted by touch. He is the only source known to have corroborated these events.

The painting was also commissioned in part to counter reports of French atrocities during their capture of Jaffa. After two French messengers sent to parley with the Ottomans had been killed and their heads displayed on the city walls, Napoleon promised the troops under his command two days and nights to plunder the city. After the city capitulated on the fourth day, the French brutally sacked the city, "slaughtering Christians, Jews and Muslims indiscriminately." Napoleon also ordered the mass killing of 3,000 Ottoman prisoners in French captivity. News of such atrocities contradicted the French justification for their invasions of Ottoman-held Egypt and Syria, namely that it was a mission civilisatrice "that would bring enlightenment to the benighted lands of the East." The painting "thus had a very specific propagandist function."

== Composition ==
This painting uses elements of the composition of Jacques-Louis David's 1784 Oath of the Horatii, also held at the Louvre, such as the three arcades from Oath, which defined three different worlds (the three sons making the oath in the left, the father brandishing the swords in the middle and the women abandoned to sadness in the right), a principle taken up in this painting as well.

It is sometimes mistaken to be set in a mosque but is actually set in the Armenian Saint Nicholas Monastery, whose courtyard can be seen in the background. Further into the background are the walls of Jaffa, with a breached tower above that flies an oversized French flag. The smoke from a fire, or excessive cannon smoke, dominates the town.

To the left, dominated by a typically Egyptian horseshoe arch, a man is richly dressed in the oriental manner hands out bread and is aided by a servant carrying a bread-basket. Behind them, two black men carry a stretcher on which is a form, probably a cadaver. The two-coloured arcade opens out on a gallery full of the sick.

To the right, under two arcades, under a broken arch, is Napoleon, accompanied by his officers, touching the armpit bubo presented to him by one of the sick. In front of him, an Arab doctor is caring for another sick man, and a blind man struggles to approach the general. The bottom of the painting is occupied by prostrate and extended men. The light of the painting and the play of colours paint Bonaparte's gesture in the best possible light.

== Analysis ==
External videos
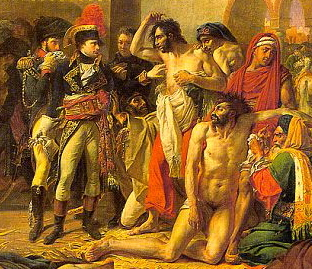
- Gros's Napoleon Bonaparte Visiting the Plague-Stricken in Jaffa at Smarthistory

The capture and the violent sack of Jaffa by the French army under Bonaparte on 7 March 1799 were rapidly followed by an outbreak of bubonic plague, identified by January 1799, which decimated the army. On 11 March, Bonaparte made a spectacular visit to his sick soldiers and touched them, which was considered to be either magnificent or suicidal, according to one's point of view on the Napoleonic legend or of the terrors of an age of plagues.

The Napoleonic army requested the help of the priests from the Armenian monastery, who provided medicine that was able to cure some of the soldiers. Napoleon personally thanked the Armenian patriarch and gifted him with his own tent and sword.

The sick man with bandaged eyes on the right is suffering from blindness as well as plague. Since the army's arrival in Egypt in July 1798, several French had suffered serious eye problems because of the sand, dust and the extreme light of the sun.

In 1804, there was no question of representing it as other than a daring deed by Bonaparte, but the officer behind Napoleon tries to stop him touching the bubo. The means by which bubonic plague spread were still unknown in the early 19th century, and the flea's role in its transmission was unknown until Paul-Louis Simond found evidence for it in 1898. Touching a bubo with a bare hand was not particularly risky since all of the other actors in the scene are now known to be running exactly the same risk of transmission of the disease by fleas. The left-hand officer's action of holding something over his mouth and nose is not entirely unjustified, however, since certain cases of bubonic plague can evolve into a pulmonary plague, with a highly-elevated risk of infection from aerosols emitted by patients' coughs.

Medical efforts to stop the plague, seen a little further to the right, were unchanged since the Middle Ages. An old doctor is incising the bubos to let the pus flow out, which is in fact inefficient in terms of treating the disease and weakens the patient. He has already operated on a bubo under the raised right arm of his patient, who holds a bloodied compress under his arm, and is wiping his blade ready to incise a second bubo. The doctor's assistant supports the patient during the operation. The bodies are sick and languishing, and the hero is less heroic for being surrounded by ordinary people. Idealism and classicism were abandoned in favour of a certain romanticism. In effect, it is suffering in painted form, which was a novelty since previously, only noble deaths were painted.

On 23 April 1799, during the Siege of Acre, Bonaparte suggested to Desgenettes, the expedition's chief doctor, that the sick should be administered a fatal-level dose of opium. Desgenettes refused to perform euthanasia. On 27 May, Napoleon made a second visit to the plague victims.

In the context of the Troubadour style, especially while Napoleon was becoming emperor, this episode evoked the tradition of the thaumaturgical royal touch which the French kings carried out with sufferers of scrofula.

=== The mysterious "32" ===
A longstanding question concerning the interpretation of the painting is the significance of the number "32" on the hat of one of the patients. Since Gros, the artist, was 32 years old at the time at the composition, the shy, naked prisoner behind the patient raising his arm in front of Napoleon may in fact be a hidden self-portrait.

Alternatively, it could reflect the soldier's regiment since the 32e demi-brigade was one of the French units committed to the Egyptian campaign.

== See also ==
- Napoleon in popular culture
- Armenian Patriarchate of Jerusalem

== Sources ==
- "Peste", from Encyclopædia Universalis
- Jean Massin, Almanach du Premier empire, 1988, ISBN 2-85229-701-9.
