= St. Nersess Armenian Seminary =

Armenian Seminary in New York

Coordinates: 41°7′56.8452″N 73°41′7.6848″W

St. Nersess Armenian Seminary is a seminary under the auspices of the Armenian Church of America, which is the American branch of the Armenian Apostolic Church. Since 2015, it has been located in Armonk, New York and is the only Armenian theological seminary in the Western hemisphere. The seminary is named after St. Nerses IV the Gracious, who was Catholicos of All Armenians from 1166 to 1173.

== History ==
St. Nersess Armenian Seminary was an idea of Archbishop Tiran Nersoyan, who served as the first dean. Nersoyan felt that the then 19 priests in the Armenian Church in America could hardly support the more than 30 parishes and first proposed a seminary in America in 1947.

It was founded in 1961 in Evanston, Illinois and was originally affiliated with Seabury-Western Theological Seminary in suburban Chicago.

In 1967, the seminary moved to New York, to bring the seminary closer to the geographical center of the diocese and to forge stronger ties with other churches of the East. Starting during this period the seminary became affiliated with St. Vladimir's Orthodox Theological Seminary with which it has maintained a close relationship, including a joint visit to his Holiness Karekin II, Catholicos of All Armenians.

In 1978, the seminary purchased their own building in New Rochelle. To celebrate the 40th anniversary of the seminary, a symposium on Armenian and Christian near East worship traditions was held, later collected in book form in 2006.

In 2012, a new campus was planned and built for the seminary in Armonk, which opened in 2015 and was formally dedicated the following year.

== Academics ==
The seminary offers two graduate degrees, a Master of Divinity in conjunction with St. Vladimir's and a Master of Arts in Armenian Christian Studies. In addition, it has a summer program for the training and education of deacons. It also regularly offers exchange programs with the Armenian Patriarchate of Jerusalem's Sts. Tarkmanchatz School.

The seminary has published the St. Nersess Theological Review, an Armenological publication, since 1996. The journal is the only English language academic journal dedicated to the study of Armenian Christianity.
