= Sion (periodical) =

Periodical of the Armenian Patriarchate of Jerusalem

Sion (Armenian: Սիոն, lit. 'Zion') is the official organ of the Armenian Patriarchate of Jerusalem. It was published in Jerusalem from 1866 to 1877, when it ceased publication for 50 years. It resumed publication in 1927 by the order of Patriarch Yeghishe Tourian and has continued with brief interruptions until today.

Sion has published extensive news of the Patriarchate and its activities in its territorial jurisdiction (Israel, Palestine and Jordan), asserting its special position in the Armenian Apostolic Church, its relation to the Mother Church in Armenia and relation to other churches, political authorities, organizations and individuals. It also publishes academic and scientific articles related to Armenian religion, history, arts and culture.
