= Tiran Nersoyan =

Armenian clergyman

Tiran Nersoyan (August 23, 1904 in Antep, Cilicia, Ottoman Empire – September 1, 1989 in New York City) was an Armenian Apostolic clergyman. He was Patriarch-elect of the Armenian Patriarchate of Jerusalem very briefly in 1957–1958 but never received his position as Patriarch.

Born Nerses Tavugchyan in Antep in the Ottoman Empire, the son of a priest, he was forced to leave to Syria because of the Armenian genocide. Trained at the Seminary at Jerusalem, he was ordained priest on 21 June 1928, taking the religious name Tiran and changing his surname to Nersoyan. He served during the Second World War as priest in London.

In 1943, Nersoyan was elected Archbishop Primate of the Eastern Diocese of the Armenian Apostolic Church of America reporting to Catholicos of All Armenians in the Mother See of Etchmiadzin. However, he did not arrive in the United States until late 1944 because of the difficulties of wartime travel. He served for 10 years in office until 1953. Catholicos Kevork named him an archbishop on 20 May 1951.

Nersoyan was elected as Armenian Patriarch of Jerusalem in 1957, but was deported from Jordan to Lebanon in August 1958 before he could be installed. Supporters alleged his deportation was influenced by his successor as Armenian Patriarch.

In this period, Archbishop Nersoyan established 11 new churches, 21 priests were added to the clergy. He founded the Armenian Church Youth Organization of America (A.C.Y.O.A.) as well as a church choir association. Under his direction, land was purchased for St. Vartan Cathedral and Cultural Center in Manhattan, New York City at Second Avenue and 34th Street. The Primate was also a founder of the St. Nersess Seminary in New Rochelle, N.Y., and served as its dean. A religious scholar, Archbishop Nersoyan lectured extensively and wrote articles and theological studies in Armenian and English. The fifth edition of his translation and commentary of the Divine Liturgy of the Armenian Church was published in London in 1984.

Archbishop Nersoyan died of cancer in New York City in September 1989.

Religious titles
Vacant Title last held by Guregh Israelian	Armenian Patriarch of Jerusalem; 1957–1958 (did not receive his position as patriarch)	Vacant Title next held by Yeghishe Derderian
