= Nourhan Manougian =

Armenian Patriarch of Jerusalem

His Beatitude Nourhan Manougian
- Armenian Patriarch of Jerusalem
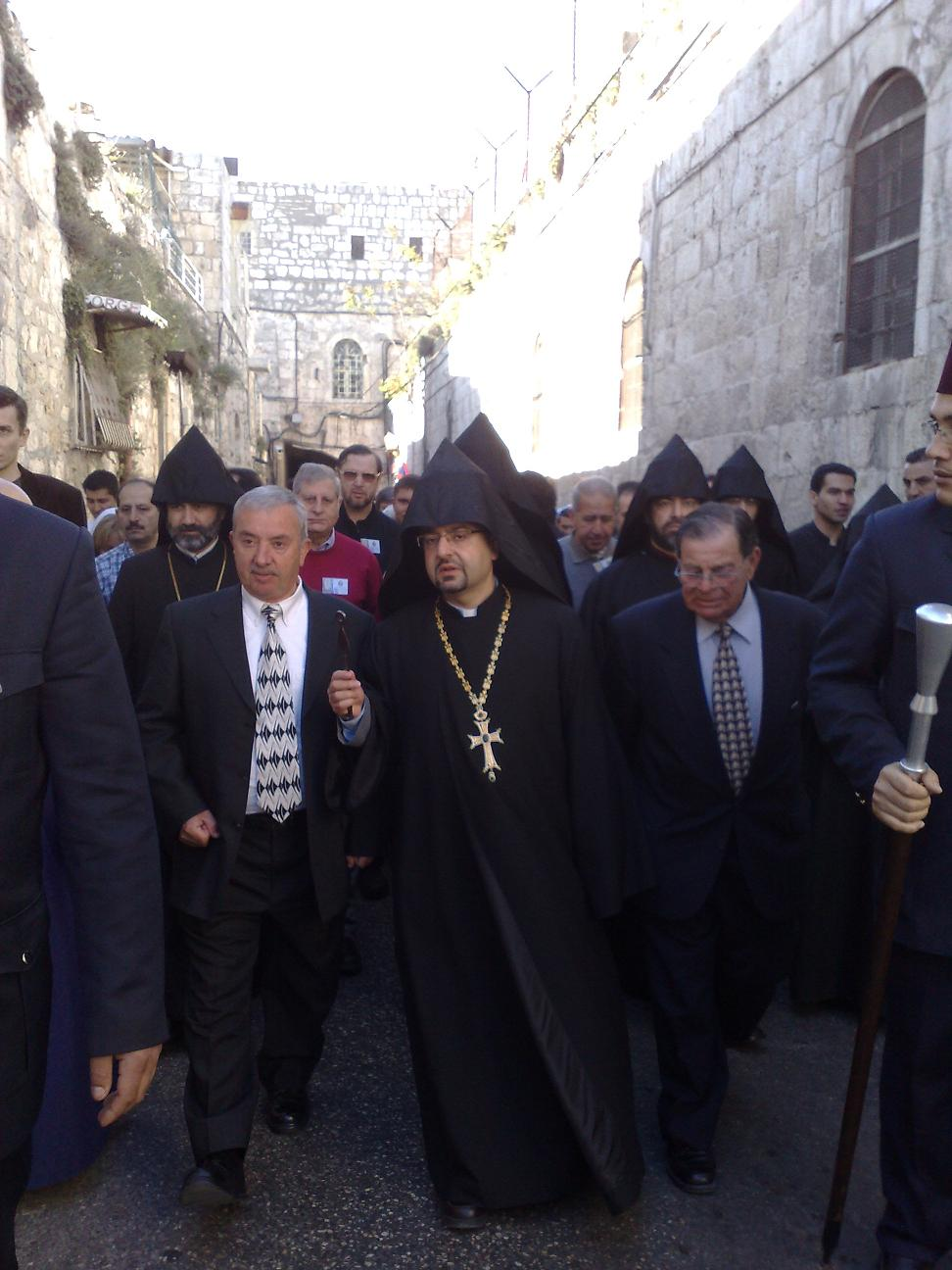
- Church: Armenian Apostolic Church
- See: Apostolic See of St. James in Jerusalem
- Elected: 24 January 2013 and enthroned on 4 June 2013
- Predecessor: Torkom Manoogian

Personal details
- Born: 24 June 1948 (age 77) Aleppo, Syria
- Denomination: Armenian Apostolic

Patriarch Nourhan Manougian (Armenian: Ամենապատիւ Տէր Նուրհան Արքեպիսկոպոս Մանուկեան Երուսաղէմի Հայ Պատրիարք; born 24 June 1948) is the 97th Armenian Patriarch of Jerusalem serving the Armenian Patriarchate of Jerusalem of the Armenian Apostolic Church. He is the 97th in the succession of Armenian Patriarchs of Jerusalem, succeeding Patriarch Torkom Manoogian, who served for 22 years (1990–2012). Manougian was elected as Armenian Patriarch of Jerusalem on 24 January 2013.

== Background ==
Manougian was born on 24 June 1948 in Aleppo, Syria. His baptismal name was Boghos. After completing his primary education at the Haigazian School of Aleppo, he studied at the Theological Seminary of Antelias in Lebanon from 1961. He went to the Jarankavoratz Theological Seminary of the Armenian Patriarchate of Jerusalem in 1966. He was ordained a deacon in 1968 and in 1971 ordained as celibate priest by Patriarch Yeghishe Derderian.

In 1972, he became pastor of the Armenian community in Geneva, Switzerland. In 1974, Manougian returned to the Middle East and served as the pastor to the Armenian communities of Jaffa and Haifa in Israel. He also taught at the Sts. Tarkmanchatz School in Jerusalem's Armenian Quarter.

In 1979, Manougian served the Armenian Community in Almelo, the Netherlands. In 1982 he studied at The General Theological Seminary, upon invitation by the Primate of the Armenian Church of America, Archbishop Torkom Manoogian. Manougian graduated in 1985. During his time in America, Manougian served as pastor to communities in Philadelphia, Pennsylvania; Springfield, Massachusetts; and Houston, Texas.

== Patriarchate of Jerusalem ==
In 1998, Manougian was elected as the Grand Sacristan of the Armenian Patriarchate of Jerusalem and in 1999 ordained a bishop. In 2000 he was ordained as archbishop by Catholicos Karekin II, Catholicos of All Armenians. In 2009 he became patriarchal vicar, supervising the patriarchate. On 24 January 2013, Manougian was elected as the 97th Armenian Patriarch of Jerusalem. On 4 June 2013, he was officially enthroned.

Since his enthronement, Manougian has undertaken already several renewing projects, such as renovations of St. James Cathedral; as well as participating in the extensive renovations of the Church of the Nativity in Bethlehem and the Edicule in the Holy Sepulcher in Jerusalem.

On February 6, 2014, Manougian received the honorary Doctorate of Divinity degree from the General Theological Seminary in Manhattan, New York.

In July 2021 Manougian signed a contract with Australian-Jewish businessman Danny Rothman (aka Rubenstein) to lease about 25% of the Armenian Quarter in Jerusalem's Old City for 98 years without letting out the details of contract.

Religious titles
Preceded by Torkom Manoogian	Armenian Patriarch of Jerusalem; 2013–present	Succeeded by incumbent
