= Abraham I of Jerusalem =

First Armenian Patriarch of Jerusalem

- Title: Armenian Patriarch of Jerusalem

Religious life
- Religion: Christianity
- Church: Armenian Apostolic Church

Abraham I of Jerusalem (Armenian: Աբրահամ Ա.) was the first Armenian Patriarch of Jerusalem from 638 to 669 A.D.

He served the Armenian Patriarchate of Jerusalem which was founded in 638 by the Armenian Apostolic Church in the Holy Land; the Armenian Apostolic Church began appointing its own bishop in Jerusalem, generally known as the Armenian Patriarch of Jerusalem. The office has continued, with some interruptions, to this day.

== See also ==
- Christianity in Israel

Religious titles
| Preceded by None (new title created) | Armenian Patriarch of Jerusalem; 638–669 | Succeeded by Krikor I Yetesattzi |
