= Mardikian =

Mardikian (Armenian: Մարտիկյան) is an Armenian surname. Notable people with the surname include:

- George Mardikian (1903–1977), Armenian restaurateur, chef, writer and philanthropist
- Kevork Mardikian (born 1954), Syrian footballer
- Mardik Mardikian (born 1992), Syrian footballer

== See also ==
- Mardik
