= Edward Mardigian =

Engineer

Edward Mardigian (October 25, 1907, Constantinople – November 3, 1993, USA) was an engineer, Armenian-American community leader and philanthropist.

== Early life ==
Edward Mardigian was the youngest of Stephen Mardigian's children, and was only six when he immigrated to the United States. Stephan Mardigian, who had been working as a butcher in Toledo, Ohio, saved enough money to bring the family to the United States in October 1914, on the eve of the Armenian genocide.

Stephen Mardigian's first order of business, once settled, was to ensure for his children the best educational opportunities and benefits that America had to offer, and which had been denied to his people in Ottoman Turkey. Edward Mardigian became an excellent student, and couldn't seem to surround himself with enough books to satisfy his thirst for knowledge, particularly for the automotive industry and technology.

== Education and career ==
Losing his mother at the age of 12 was very difficult for young Edward, but was not enough to slow him down, and by the age of 15 he joined his brothers at the Ford Motor Company, enrolling in the Trade School in Highland Park, MI. He entered the industrial field as a tool and die designing apprentice student. He graduated in 1928 with excellent marks and was offered a great position with Ford Motor Company in Detroit.

In 1930 Mardigian left Ford Motor Company and joined Chrysler Corporation, which allowed him to attend night classes at the Detroit Institute of Technology and Wayne State University, where he soon would earn the equivalent of a high school diploma and the training of a mechanical engineer.

By 1933, Mardigian had acquired the education and technical experience that marked the beginning of his professional career. That year, he joined Briggs Manufacturing Company as Assistant Chief Tool Designer. In 1934, Briggs sent him to London to supervise a major tooling program at the company’s Dagenham plant, and in 1936 he returned to the United States to lead the process and estimating department during the early years of the Second World War.

Mardigian left Briggs in 1943 and formed a tool and die company called Oakman Engineering Co., and the following year bought a major stake in Northern Engineering Co. These two companies would later enter the production realm and become known as the Mardigian Corporation.

== Philanthropy ==
=== Armenian community ===
In 1984, Mr. Mardigian helped assure the future of the then-forming Armenian Assembly of America by making a contribution to that organizations endowment fund. Helen Mardigian is a life Trustee of the Armenian Assembly of America.

=== Armenian Church ===
The Helen and Edward Mardigian Institute is a training program for educators, particularly for Sunday school teachers without a professional education background. The program helps them reach out to children by providing ongoing training, inspiration, and encouragement free of charge to local Sunday school staffs across the Eastern Diocese. The program takes place bi-annually at the Diocesan Center in New York City and at the St. Nersess Armenian Seminary.

The Mardigian Institute was founded in 1978 and has trained more than 350 Sunday school educators. The program is organized by the staff of the Diocese’s Department of Youth and takes small groups of around 10 students at a time for one-week courses, which include demonstrations, lectures and discussions of Christian faith.

Along with Alex and Marie Manoogian, Edward and Helen Mardigian were major benefactors of St. John's Armenian Church in Southfield, MI.

=== Academia ===
In 1987, Helen and Edward Mardigian donated large amounts to the University of Michigan, namely $500,000 to the Armenian Research Center endowment and $350,000 to an endowment for the campus library. Pleased with the work of the Armenian Research Center and with the generosity of the Mardigians towards the University, which has extended beyond their original contributions, the then-Chancellor of the Dearborn campus, William A. Jenkins, recommended to the President of the University of Michigan, at that time Harold Shapiro, that the University name the campus library the Edward and Helen Mardigian Library. This the Regents did the following year.

=== Medicine ===
==== Cancer and geriatrics centers ====
In 1996, a $3 million gift from the Mardigian Foundation in honor of the late Detroit-area industrialist and philanthropist Edward Mardigian and his wife, Helen, helped in the construction of the U-M Comprehensive Cancer Center and Geriatrics Center Building. In recognition of the family foundation's generosity, the building's lobby was named the Edward Mardigian Memorial Lobby. "We have always believed in sharing," Helen Mardigian said in announcing the gift. "We have always wanted to do something for the Hospital. Edward would be very pleased."

==== Hospital waiting area ====
Funded by a $1 million donation from the Edward Mardigian Family, the Mardigian Family Surgery Center at the Royal Oak Beaumont Hospital provides a waiting area for family members. The area features a children's playroom and a business center with computer access and health care information. To enhance patient privacy, coaster pagers, similar to those used in restaurants, summon waiting family members to the postsurgery consultation with the surgeon.

=== Art, culture and history ===
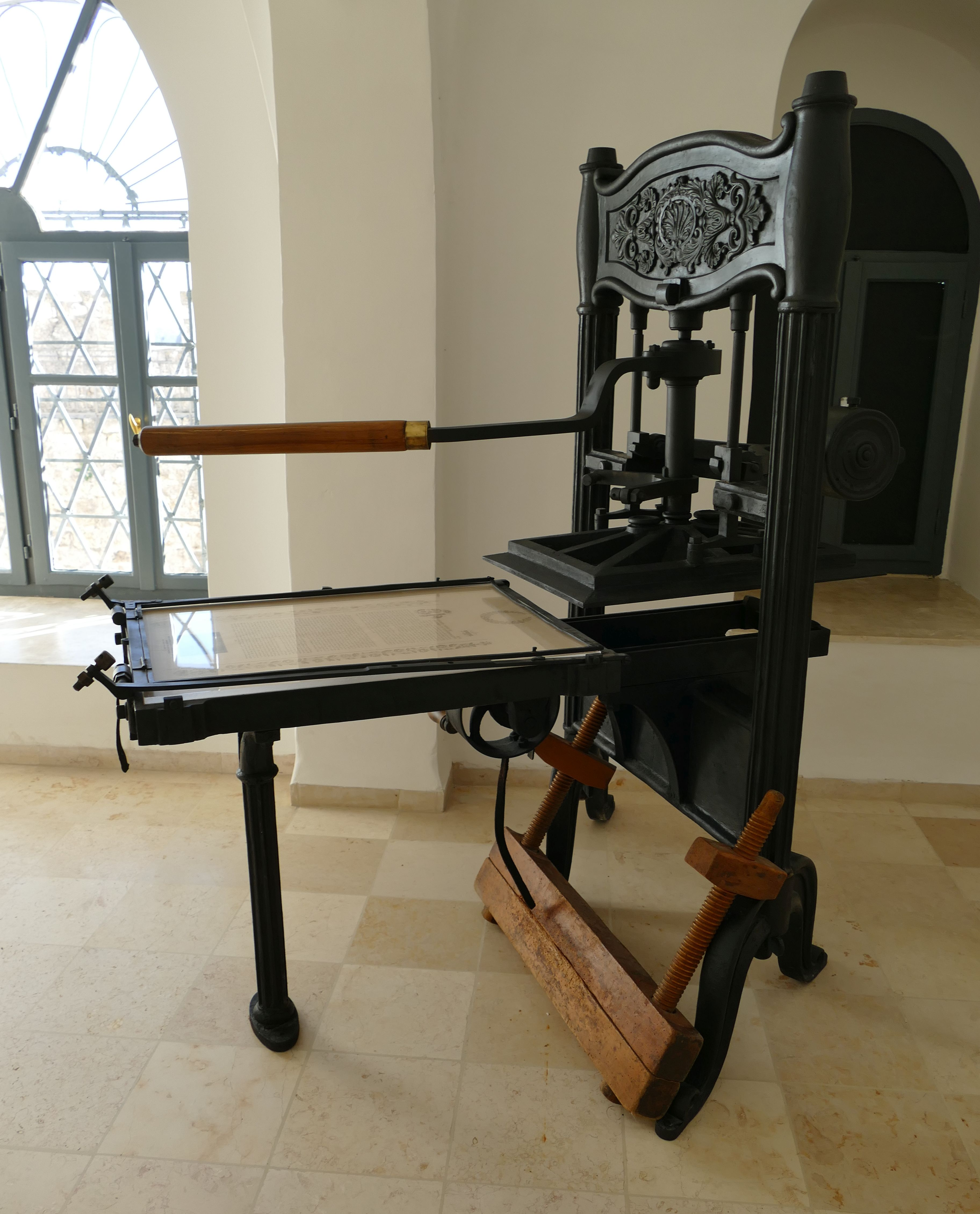
Replica of Gutenberg’s original printing press.

Opened in 1979, the Edward and Helen Mardigian Museum of Armenian Art and Culture of Jerusalem is located in a 200-year-old building that once housed the Armenian Patriarchate's Theological Seminary. Closed over many years, it reopened in 2023. The museum presents a picturesque overview of Armenian history, religion and cultural heritage.

Exhibits include historical and religious artifacts, many brought to Jerusalem by pilgrims, including hand-woven rugs, a collection of Armenian coins, huge copper cauldrons crafted by Armenian smiths, colorful tiles from the world-famous Kütahya district, and a map of the ancient world printed in Armenian. There is also a replica of Gutenberg's original printing press, the first to be established in Jerusalem in 1833.

== Awards ==
The Armenian Students' Association of America awarded Mr. Mardigian the Sarafian Award for Good Citizenship in 1986.
