= List of Armenian patriarchs of Jerusalem =

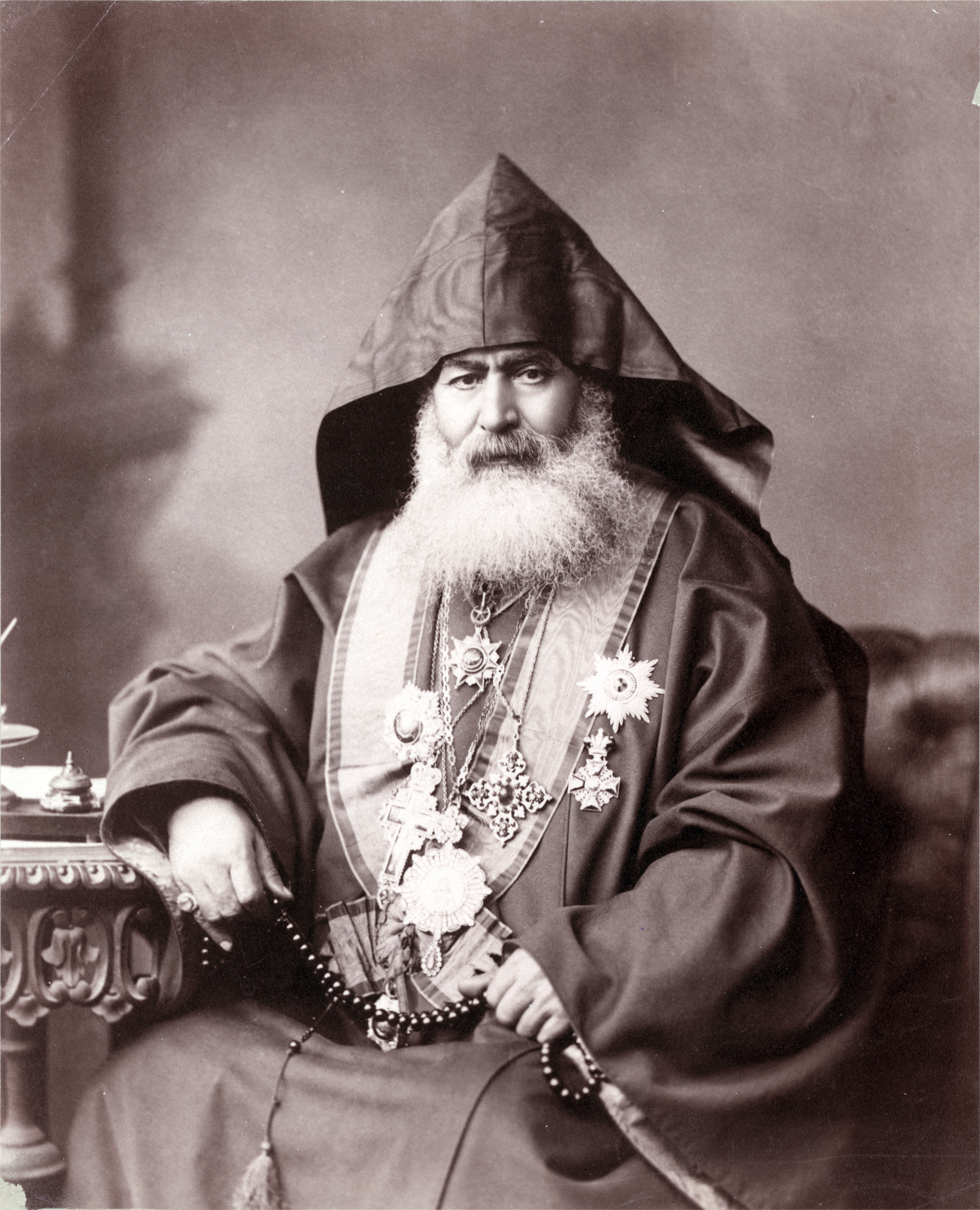
Harootiun Vehabedian, Armenian Patriarch of Jerusalem, 1900 (Library of Congress).

In 638, the Armenian Apostolic Church began appointing its own bishop of Jerusalem. In the early 14th century these bishops came to be known as patriarchs. The office has continued, with some interruptions, to this day.

The bishop at the Armenian Patriarchate of Jerusalem is given the title of Patriarch in deference to Jerusalem's holy status within Christianity and has an independent jurisdiction from the Catholicos of All Armenians. The Patriarch's title is "His Beatitude".

== Armenian patriarchs of Jerusalem ==
- Abraham I (638–669)—Աբրահամ Ա.
- Krikor I Yetesattzi (669–696) -- Գրիգոր Ա. Եդեսացի
- Kevork (696–708) -- Գէորգ
- Mgrdich (708–730) -- Մկրտիչ
- Hovhannes I (730–758) -- Յովհաննէս Ա.
- Stepanos (758–774) -- Ստեփանոս
- Yeghia (774–797) -- Եղիա
  - unknown
- Abraham II (885–909) -- Աբրահամ Բ.
  - unknown
- Krikor II (981–1006) -- Գրիգոր Բ.
- Arsen (1006–1008) -- Արսէն
- Mesrob (1008) -- Մեսրոպ
  - Arsen (1008–1038), restored—Արսէն
  - unknown
- Simeon I (1090–1109) -- Սիմէոն Ա.
- Movses (1109–1133) -- Մովսէս
- Esayee I (1133–1152) -- Եսայի Ա.
- Sahag (1152–1180) -- Սահակ
- Abraham III (1180–1191) -- Աբրահամ Գ.
- Minas (1191–1205) -- Մինաս
- Abraham IV (1215–1218) -- Աբրահամ Դ.
- Arakel (1218–1230) -- Արաքել
- Hovhannes II (1230–1238) -- Յովհաննէս Բ.
- Garabed I (1238–1254) -- Կարապետ Ա.
- Hagopos (1254–1281) -- Յակոբոս
- Sarkis I (1281–1313) -- Սարգիս Ա.
- Theodore I (1313–1316) -- Թէոդորոս Ա.
- David (1316–1321) -- Դավիթ
- Boghos (1321–1323) -- Պօղոս
- Vartan Areveltzi (1323–1332) -- Վարդան Արեւելցի
- Hovhannes III (1332–1341) -- Յովհաննէս Գ.
- Parsegh (1341–1356) -- Բարսեղ
- Krikor III (1356–1363) -- Գրիգոր Գ.
  - Giragos (coadjutor) -- Կիրակոս
- Mgrdich (1363–1378) -- Մկրտիչ
- Hovhannes IV Lehatzee (1378–1386) -- Յովհաննէս Դ. Լեհացի
- Krikor IV of Egypt (1386–1391) -- Գրիգոր Դ. Եգիպտացի
- Esayee II (1391–1394) -- Եսայի Բ.
- Sarkis II (1394–1415) -- Սարգիս Բ.
  - Mardiros (coadjutor) (1399) -- Մարտիրոս
  - Mesrob (coadjutor) (1402) -- Մեսրոպ
- Boghos Karnetzi (1415–1419) -- Պօղոս Կարնեցի
- Mardiros of Egypt (1419–1430) -- Մարտիրոս Եգիպտացի
  - Minas (coadjutor) (1426) -- Մինաս
- Esayee III (1430–1431) -- Եսայի Գ.
- Hovhannes IV (1431–1441) -- Յովհաննէս Դ.
- Abraham V Missirtzi (1441–1454) -- Աբրահամ Ե. Միսիրցի
- Mesrob (1454–1461) -- Մեսրոպ
- Bedros (1461–1476) -- Պետրոս
- Mgrdich Elovtzi (1476–1479) -- Մկրտիչ Ելովցի
- Abraham VI Periatzi (1479–1485) -- Աբրահամ Զ. Բերիացի
- Hovhannes V Missirtzi (1485–1491) -- Յովհաննէս Ե. Միսիրցի
- Mardiros Brusatzi (1491–1501) -- Մարտիրոս Բրուսացի
- Bedros (1501–1507) -- Պետրոս
- Sarkis III (1507–1517) -- Սարգիս Գ.
- Hovhannes VI (1517–1522) -- Յովհաննէս Զ.
- Theodore II of Jerusalem (Asdvadzadoor Merdeentzee) (1532–1542) -- Թէոդորոս Բ. (Աստուածատուր Մերտինցի)
- Pilibos (1542–1550) -- Փիլիպոս
  - Theodore (Asdvadzadur Merdintzi) (1550–1551), restored—Թէոդորոս (Աստուածատուր Մերտինցի)
- Antreas Merdintzi (1551–1583) -- Անդրէաս Մերտինցի
- David Merdintzi (1583–1613) -- Դաւիթ Մերտինցի
- Krikor V Kantzagetzi (1613–1645) -- Գրիգոր Ե. Գանձակեցի
- Theodore III of Jerusalem (Asdvadzadur Darontzi) (1645–1664) -- Թէոդորոս Գ. (Աստուածատուր Տարօնցի)
- Yeghiazar Hromglayetzi (coadjutor) (1664–1665) -- Եղիազար Հռոմկլայեցի
  - Theodore III of Jerusalem (Asdvadzadur Darontzi) (1665–1666), restored—Թէոդորոս Գ. (Աստուածատուր Տարօնցի)
  - Yeghiazar Hromglayetzi (1666–1668), restored—Եղիազար Հռոմկլայեցի
  - Theodore III of Jerusalem (Asdvadzadur Darontzi) (1668–1670), restored—Թէոդորոս Գ. (Աստուածատուր Տարօնցի)
  - Yeghiazar Hromglayetzi (1670–1677), restored—Եղիազար Հռոմկլայեցի
- Martiros of Crimea (1677–1680) -- Մարտիրոս Ղրիմեցի
- Hovhannes VII Amasyatzi (1680) -- Յովհաննէս Է. Ամասիացի
  - Martiros of Crimea (1681–1683), restored—Մարտիրոս Ղրիմեցի
  - Locum Tenens (1683–1684)
- Hovhannes VIII Bolsetzi (1684–1697) -- Յովհաննէս Ը. Պոլսեցի
- Simeon II (1688–1691) -- Սիմէոն Բ.
  - vacant (1691–1696)
- Minas Hamtetzi (1697–1704) -- Մինաս Համդեցի
  - Kaloosd Hetoontzi (coadjutor) -- Գալուստ Հեթունցի
  - Krikor (coadjutor) (1704–1715), also Armenian Patriarch of Constantinople - Գրիգոր
- Krikor VI Shiravantzi (Chainbearer) (1715–1749) -- Գրիգոր Զ. Շիրաւանցի (Շղթայակիր)
- Hagop Nalian (1749–1752) -- Յակոբ Նալեան
- Teotoros IV (1752–1761) -- Թէոդորոս Դ.
- Garabed II Tantchagetzi (1761–1768) -- Կարապետ Բ.
- Boghos Vanetzi (1768–1775) -- Պօղոս Վանեցի
- Hovhannes IX Kanapertzi (1775–1793) -- Յովհաննէս Թ.
- Bedros Yevtogiatzi (1793–1800) -- Պետրոս Եւդովկիացի
- Teodoros V Vanetzi (1800–1818) -- Թէոդորոս Ե. Վանեցի
- Kapriel Nigomitatzi (1818–1840) -- Գաբրիէլ Նիկոմիտացի
- Zakaria Gopetzi (1840–1846) -- Զաքարիա
- Giragos (1846–1850)—Կիրակոս
- Hovhannes X of Smyrna (1850–1860) -- Յովհաննէս Ժ. Զմիւռնացի
  - Vrtanes (1860–1864) -- Locum Tenens— Վրթանէս
- Esayi IV of Talas (1864–1885; also Esayi, Issay, Yessai, Yessay or Yessayi Garabedian) -- Եսայի Դ.
  - Yeremya Der Sahagian (1885–1889) -- Locum Tenens for Harootiun Vehabedian until the latter's arrival—Երեմիա Տէր Սահակեան
- Harootiun Vehabedian (1889–1910)—elected 1885 but stayed in Istanbul until 1889—Յարութիւն Վեհապետեան
  - vacant (1910–1921)
- Yeghishe Tourian (1921–1929) -- Եղիշէ Դուրեան
- Torkom Koushagian (1931–1939) -- Թորգոմ Գուշակեան
- Mesrob Nishanian (1939–1944) -- Մեսրոպ Նշանեան
- Guregh Israelian (1944–1949) -- Կիւրեղ Իսրայէլեան
  - vacant (1949–1957)
  - Tiran Nersoyan (1957–1958)—elected but never consecrated-Տիրան Ներսոյեան
  - vacant (1958–1960)
- Yeghishe Derderian (1960–1990) -- Եղիշէ Տէրտէրեան
- Torkom Manoogian (1990–2012)—Թորգոմ Մանուկեան
- Nourhan Manougian (2013–present)—Նուրհան Մանուկեան

== See also ==
- List of Catholicoi of Armenia
- List of Armenian Catholicoi of Cilicia
- List of Armenian Catholic Patriarchs of Cilicia
- List of Armenian Patriarchs of Constantinople
- Pro-Jerusalem Society (1918-1926) - the Patriarch was a member of its leading Council
