= Saint Nicholas Monastery, Jaffa =

Armenian monastery in Tel Aviv, Israel

Saint Nicholas Monastery Սուրբ Նիկողայոս Վանք Հայոց מנזר ניקולאס הקדוש
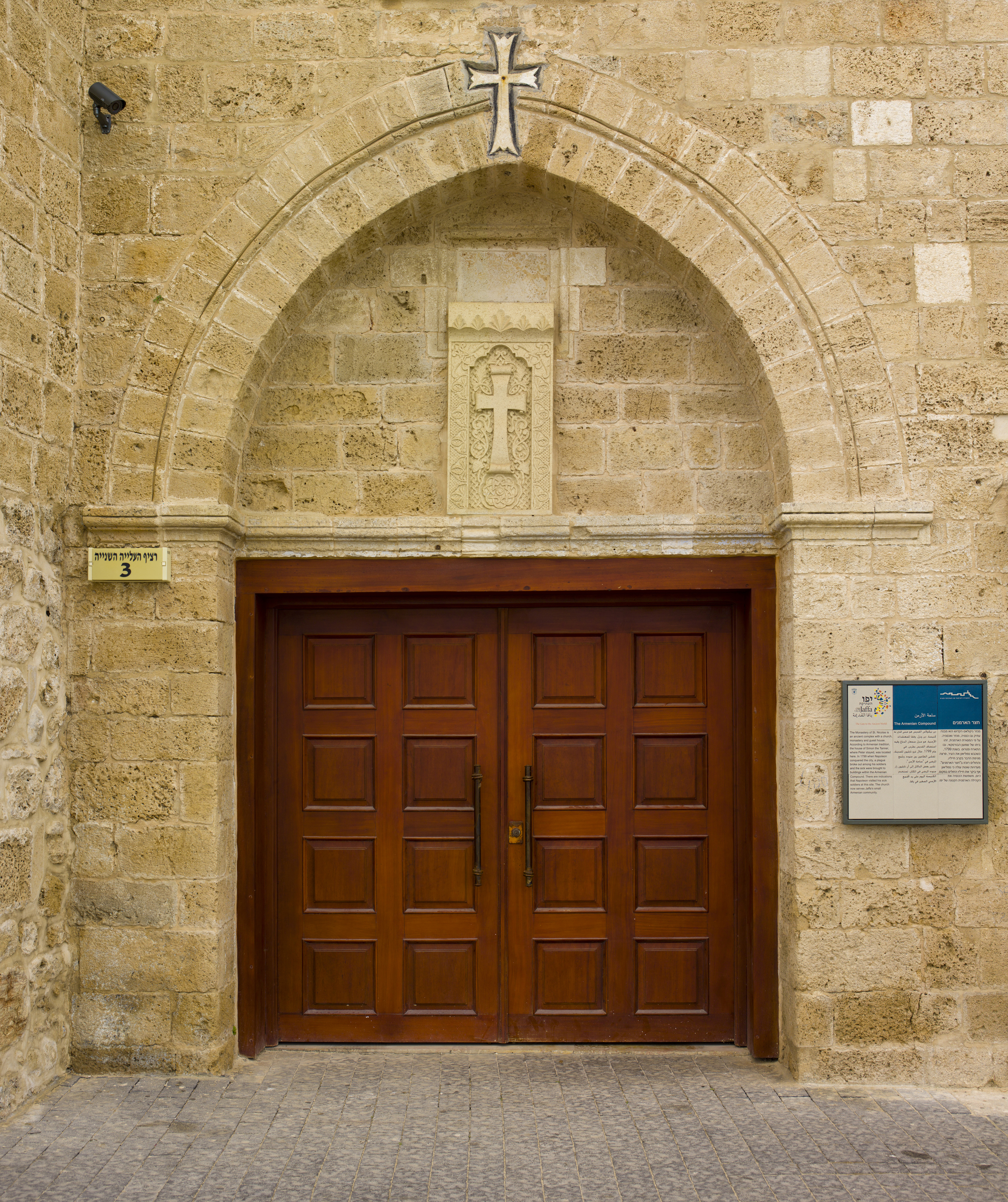
- Entrance to Saint Nicholas Monastery

Religion
- Affiliation: Armenian Apostolic Church

Location
- Location: Old Jaffa, Tel Aviv, Israel
- Interactive map of Saint Nicholas Monastery; Սուրբ Նիկողայոս Վանք Հայոց מנזר ניקולאס הקדוש

Architecture
- Style: Armenian

Saint Nicholas Monastery (Armenian: Սուրբ Նիկողայոս Վանք Հայոց, Hebrew: מנזר ניקולאס הקדוש) is an Armenian monastery built in the first millennium AD. Located in Old Jaffa, Tel Aviv, Israel, near the harbour and facing the Mediterranean, the monastery consists of a large multi-story complex that includes an Armenian church and living quarters. The monastery is under the jurisdiction of the Armenian Patriarchate of Jerusalem, which rents out parts of the complex for residential and commercial purposes.

The monastery is the setting of the Bonaparte Visiting the Plague Victims of Jaffa painting by Antoine-Jean Gros depicting Napoleon visiting his sick soldiers in the monastery's courtyard.

== History ==
Founded before AD 1000, the monastery was named for Saint Nicholas, the patron saint of sailors. The church gave shelter to pilgrims and seamen looking for a rest on their journey for many centuries. In the 18th century, the monastery was expanded and fortified.

During the Napoleonic Campaign in Egypt, the French army requested the aid of the Armenian priests at the monastery. The clerics used their secret medicines to cure some of the soldiers. Napoleon personally thanked the Armenian patriarch and gifted him with his own tent and sword. His visit to the monastery was depicted in the Bonaparte Visiting the Plague Victims of Jaffa painting by Antoine-Jean Gros.

== Gallery ==
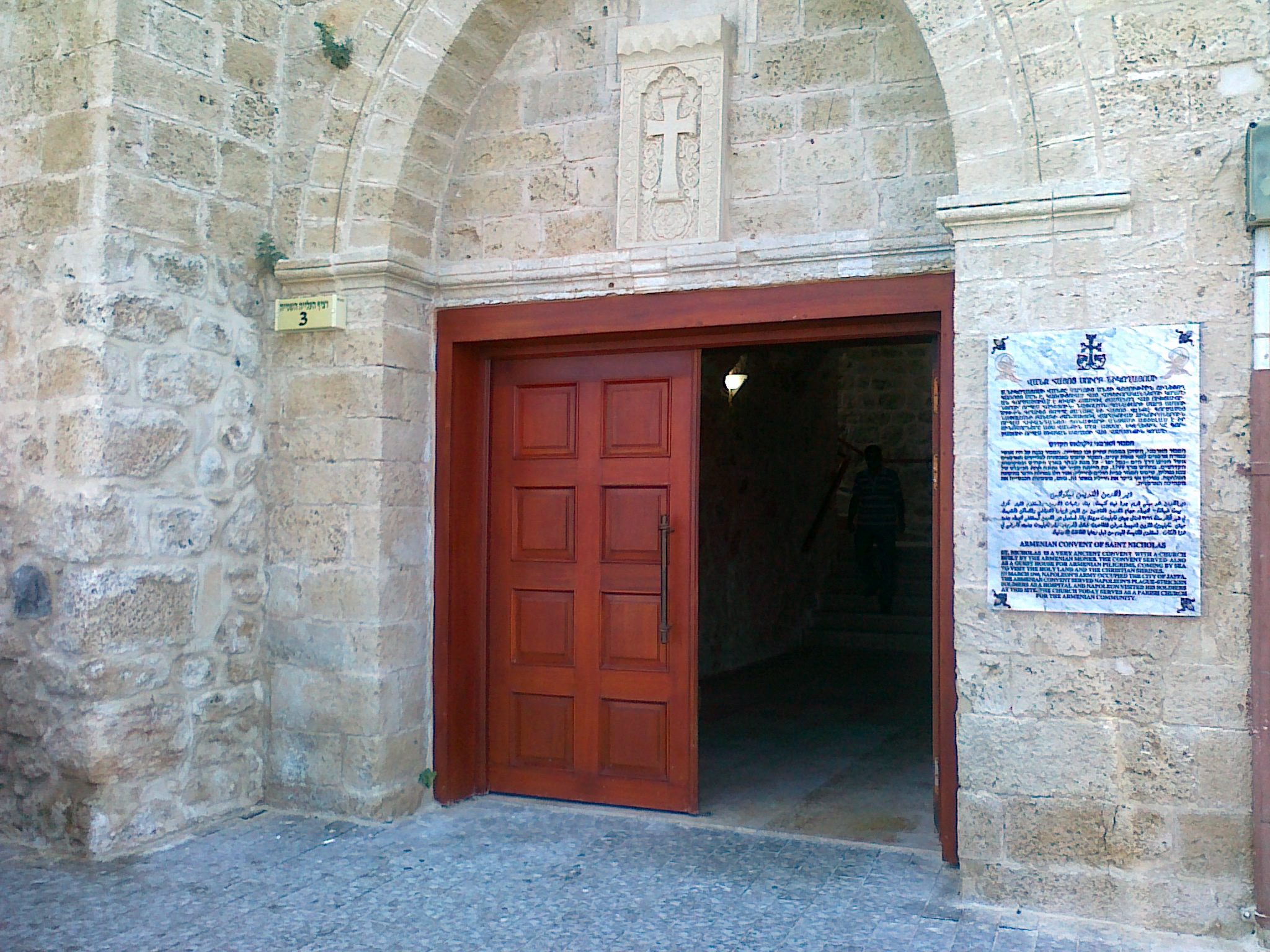
The stone plaque at the entrance to the church gives information in four languages

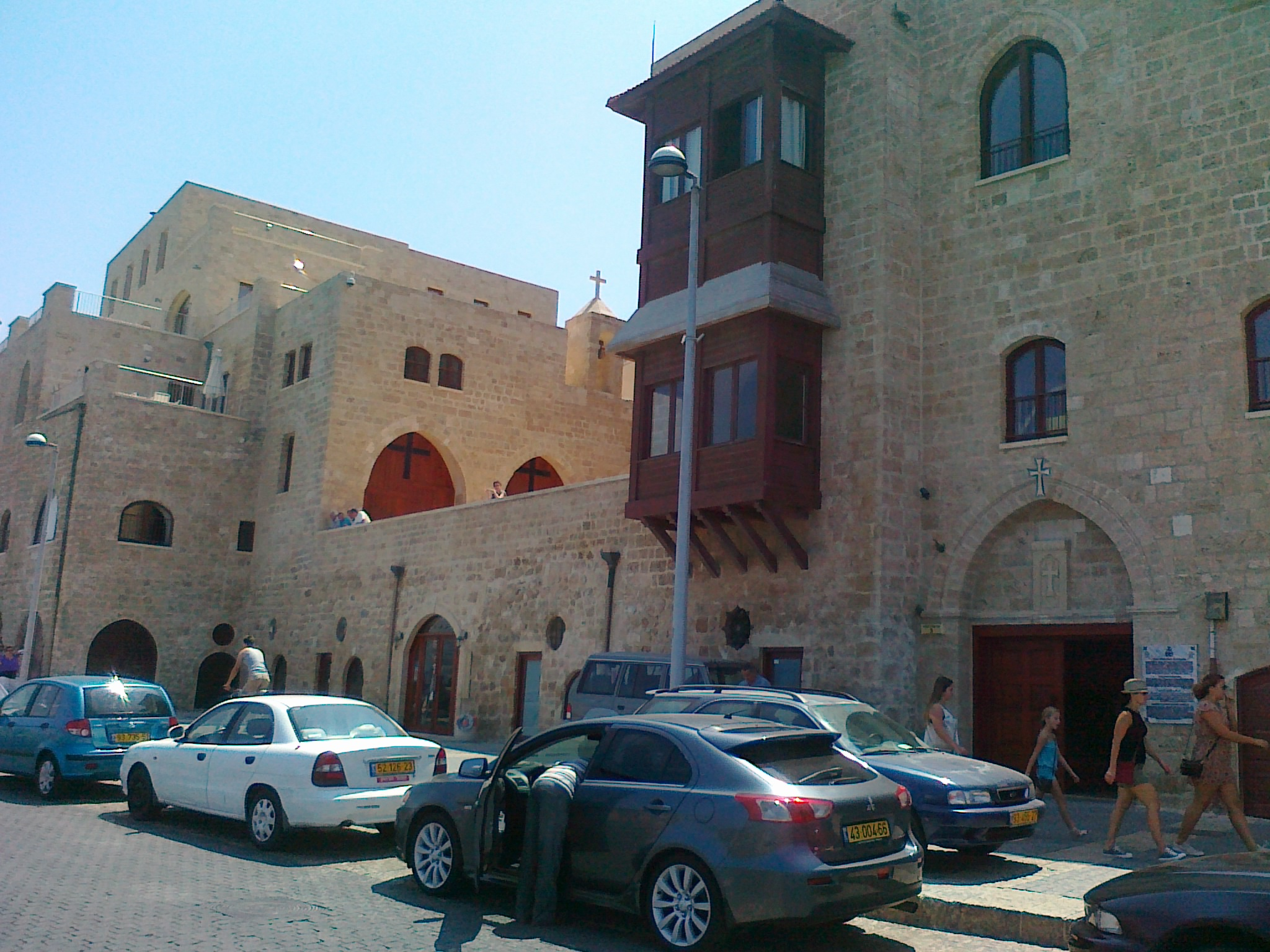
The waterfront facade of the complex

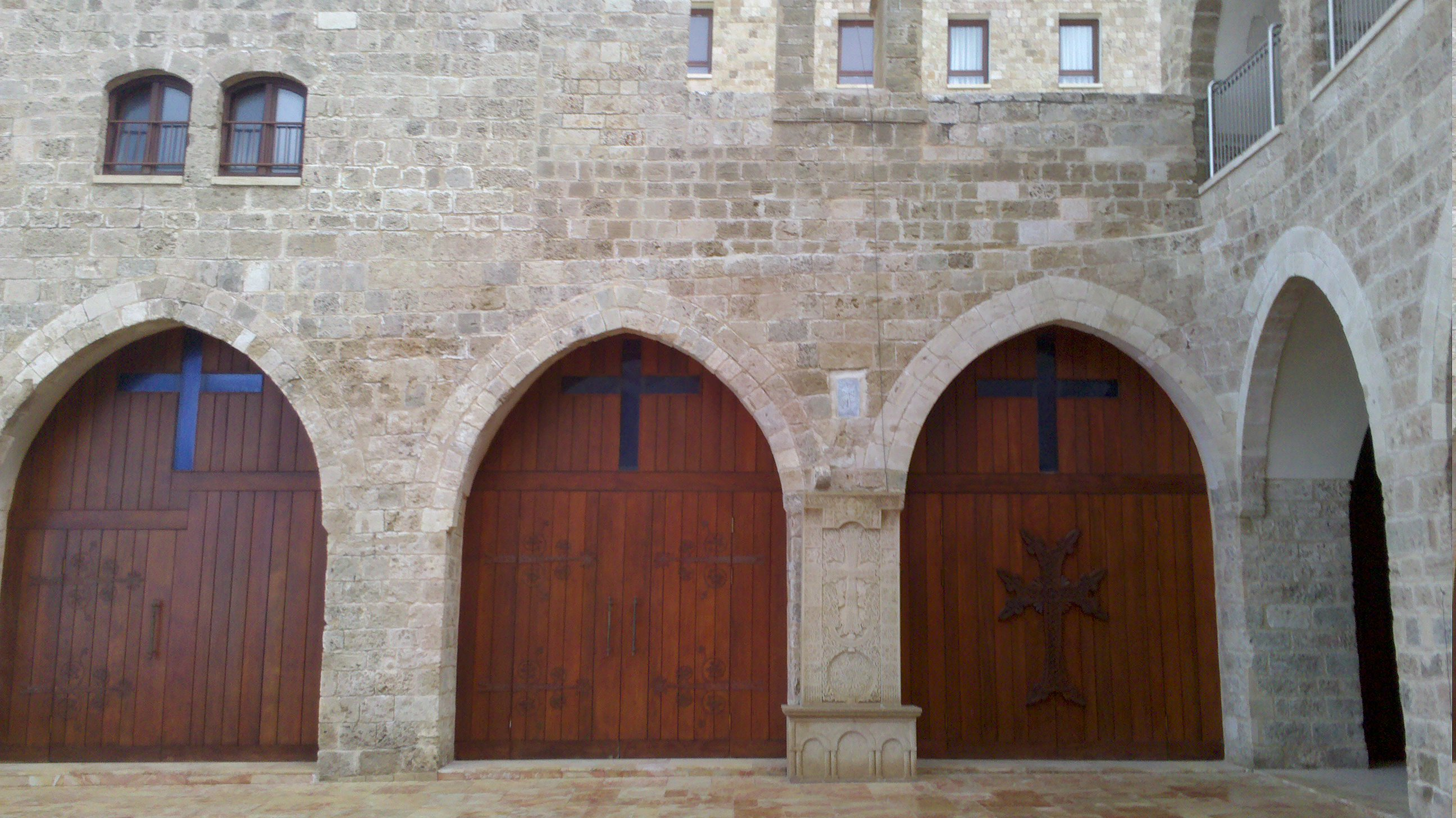
The monastery courtyard situated at the upper floor level

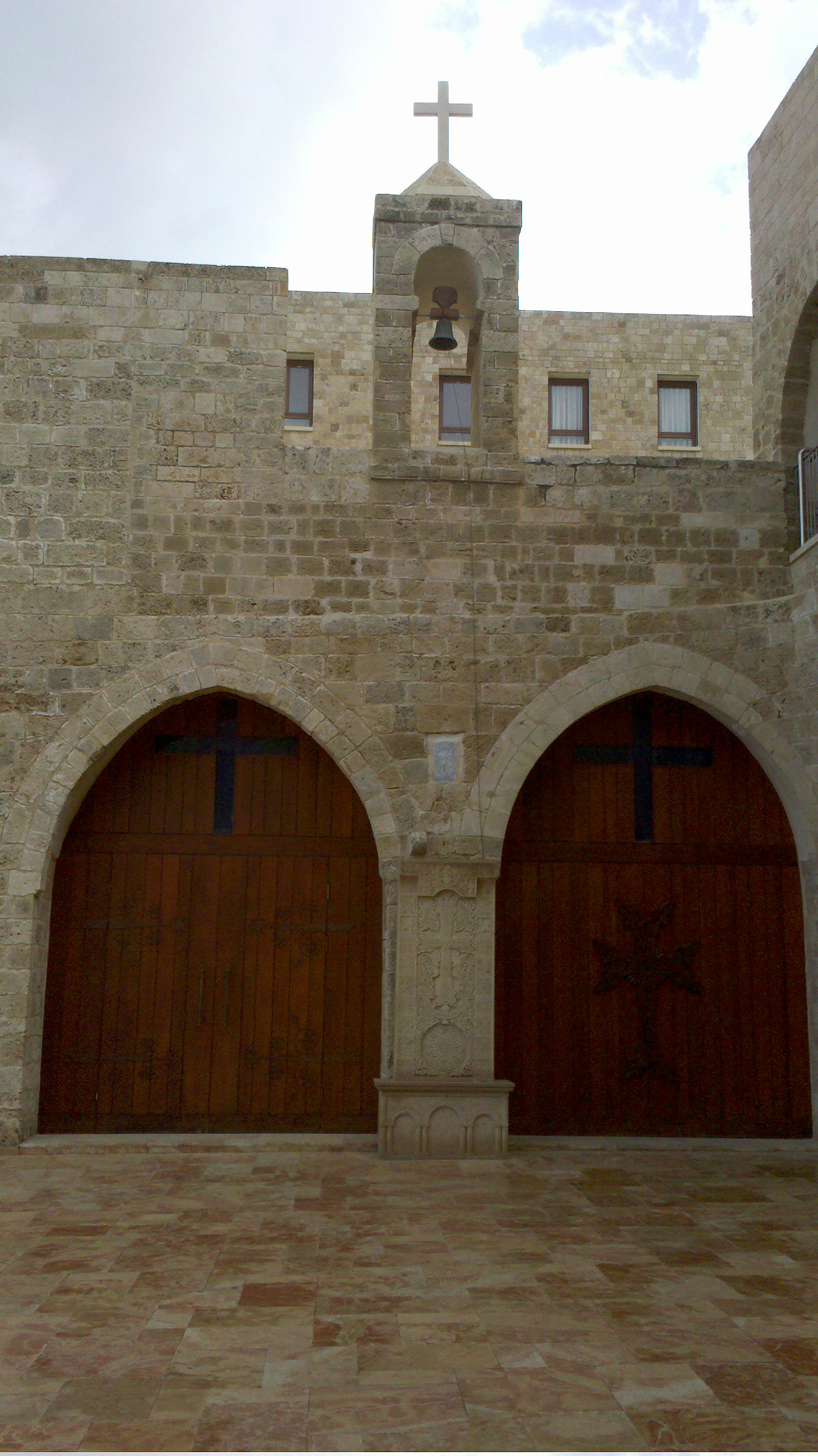
The khachkar (lit. "cross-stone") in the courtyard

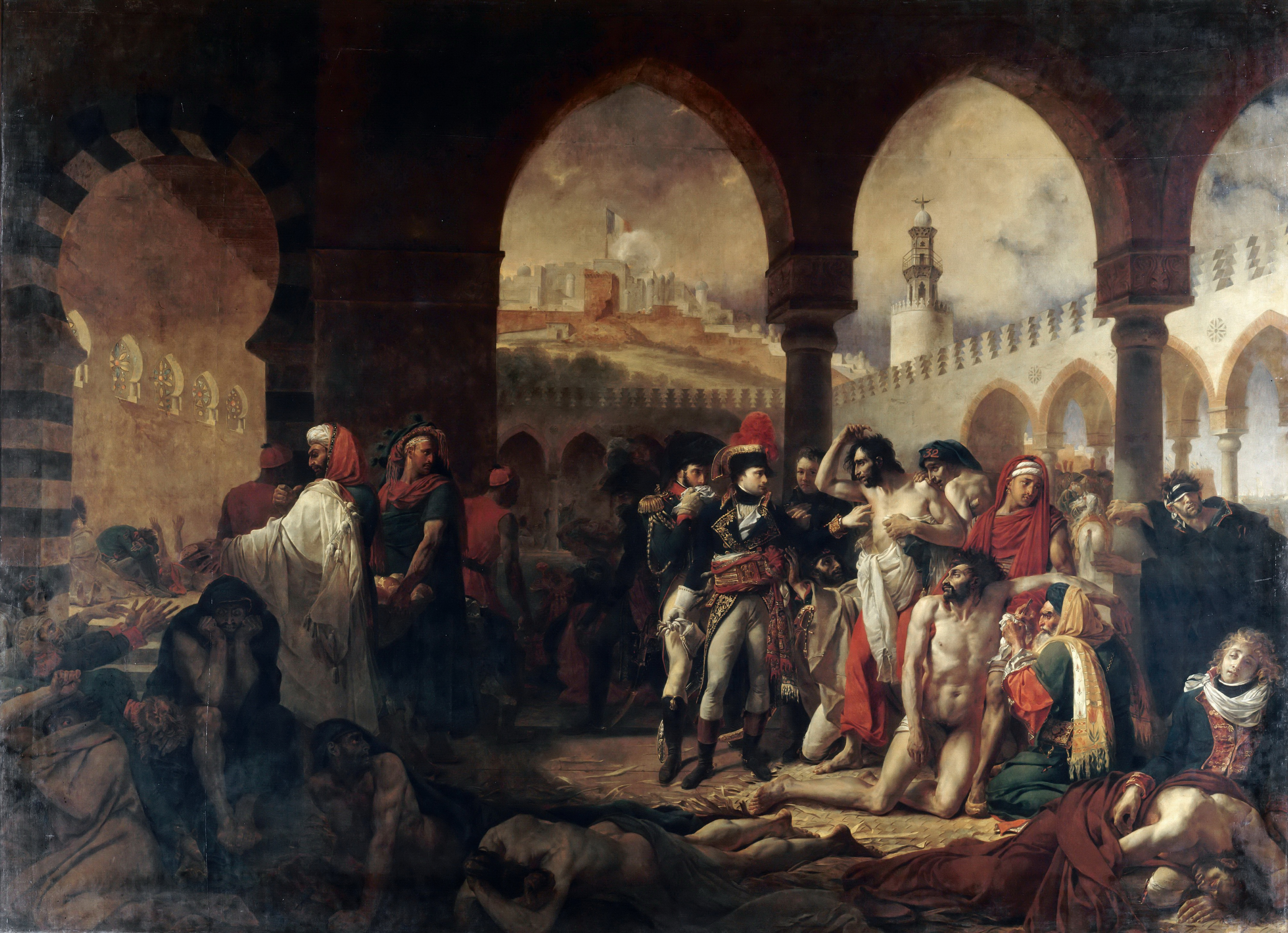
Bonaparte Visiting the Plague Victims of Jaffa (Antoine-Jean Gros, 1804)
