= Yeghishe Derderian of Jerusalem =

Armenian Patriarch of Jerusalem

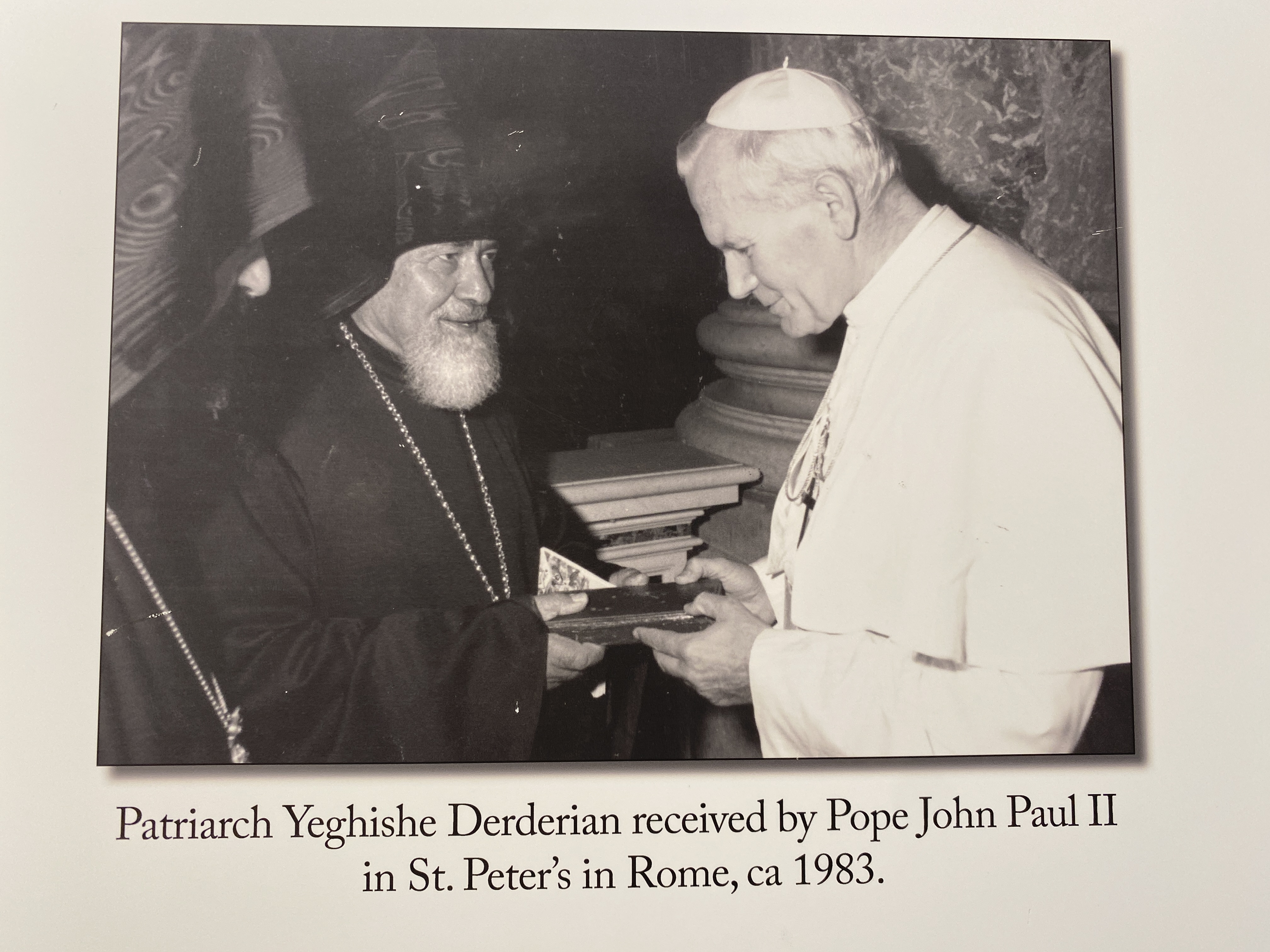
Pope John Paul II's meeting with Patriarch Yeghishe Derderian in 1983.

Patriarch Yeghishe Derderian (Armenian: Եղիշէ Տէրտէրեան) (21 July 1911 – 1 February 1990) was Armenian Patriarch of Jerusalem serving the Armenian Patriarchate of Jerusalem from 1960 to 1990.

Yeghishe was born Yeghiazar Derderian in Van, then the Ottoman Empire, now Turkey, in 1911. He lost all of his relatives in 1915, during the Armenian genocide. In 1922, he came to Jerusalem at the age of 12, to study at the St. James Theological Seminary. He served eventually as the dean of the seminary, before being named deputy patriarch of Jerusalem upon the death of Patriarch Guregh Israeli (1944–1949). He was consecrated bishop at Echmiadzin on 8 July 1951.

The position of Patriarch of Jerusalem remained vacant from 1949 to 1957 and 1958 to 1960, with a brief period from 1957 to 1958, when Tiran Nersoyan was elected Patriarch, but not consecrated.

On 8 June 1960, Yeghishe Derderian became the 95th Armenian Patriarch of Jerusalem and served for thirty years until his death in February 1990.

His period as patriarch was marred by a number of controversies. Most notably, a financial scandal involving the Patriarchate prompted calls for Derderian's resignation. In August 1983, a five-man church auditing committee issued a report charging Derderian with impropriety in handling church funds. Derderian issued an eighty-page response denying the allegations that he had misappropriated church funds. He continued to serve despite the controversy.

Patriarch Derderian was also a scholar. He wrote 22 books including biographies of religious as well as literary figures and also - under his pen name Yeghivart - poems and prose.

He died in February 1990 in his residence at the St. James convent and monastery complex in the Armenian Quarter of the Old City from a heart attack after having been ill with the flu for two days. He was 78. He was succeeded by Patriarch Torkom Manoogian, who was enthroned in November 1990.

Religious titles
Preceded by Tiran Nersoyan followed by Vacant (1958–1960)	Armenian Patriarch of Jerusalem; 1960–1990	Succeeded by Torkom Manoogian
