= Torkom Manoogian =

Armenian Patriarch of Jerusalem

Patriarch Torkom Manoogian (Armenian: Թորգոմ Մանուկեան; 16 February 1919 – 12 October 2012) was the Armenian Patriarch of Jerusalem serving the Armenian Patriarchate of Jerusalem. He was the 96th in a succession of Armenian Patriarchs of Jerusalem, succeeding Patriarch Yeghishe Derderian (1960–1990).

== Early life ==
Manoogian was born on February 16, 1919, in a refugee camp near the desert town of Baquba, north of Baghdad, Iraq. After completing elementary education at the Holy Translators Armenian School in Baghdad, he entered the theological seminary of the Armenian Patriarchate of Jerusalem. At the time he entered, he was the youngest student of his class.

On August 2, 1936, he was ordained into the diaconate by his spiritual father and teacher, the late Patriarch, Archbishop Torkom Koushagian. At his ordination as a priest on July 23, 1939, he was given the name Torkom.

== Priesthood ==
From 1939 to 1946 he served in various capacities in the Armenian Patriarchate of Jerusalem, on the board of the patriarchate's periodical and official organ, Sion, and also as sub-dean at the seminary. In July 1946 he traveled to the United States and took up the pastorate of the Holy Trinity Armenian Church in North Philadelphia, Pennsylvania. This pastorate was interrupted in 1951 when he was named as Vicar General of the Eastern Diocese of Armenian Church of America, in New York, by the primate of the diocese.

After resuming his pastorate in North Philadelphia for one year in 1954, Father Torkom returned to Jerusalem, where he became dean of the seminary. As dean of the seminary of the Armenian Patriarchate of Jerusalem, he assumed responsibility for the religious education of young seminarians preparing for the priesthood. He also headed the chancellery of the patriarchate.

He returned to the United States in 1960, and entered the Episcopal Theological School in Cambridge, Massachusetts, to follow a course of graduate study. This study was interrupted when in 1962 he was elected as Primate and Bishop of the Western Diocese of the Armenian Church of America located in Los Angeles. The diocese is under the jurisdiction of the Mother See of Holy Etchmiadzin.

== Bishop and Archbishop ==
On October 14, 1962, he was consecrated a bishop at the Mother See of Holy Etchmiadzin, Armenia, by Vazgen I, the Supreme Patriarch and Catholicos of All Armenians. After four years as Primate of the Western Diocese, in April 1966, Bishop Torkom was elected Primate of the Eastern Diocese of the Armenian Church of America located in New York.

He played a pivotal role in the construction of St. Vartan Cathedral in New York, the first Armenian cathedral in America. At the occasion of the consecration of St. Vartan Cathedral, in 1968, Vazken I conferred upon Bishop Torkom the title of archbishop. He served six consecutive terms as Primate of the Eastern Diocese of the Armenian Church of America for 24 consecutive years, from 1966 till 1990.

He acquired several academic honors, including an honorary doctorate granted by the General Theological Seminary in Manhattan, New York. In 1986 he was the recipient of two prestigious American medals: the Medal of the Statue of Liberty Medal, and the Ellis Island Medal of Honor. On January 18, 1990, the 50th anniversary of his ordination was marked as an event celebrated nationwide in the United States. In 1990, he was also chosen as "Man of the Year" by the "Religion in American Life" organization.

He played a vital role in the promotion of international ecumenical relations. He has served on the National Council of Churches. He also served as a chairman of the board of "Religion in American Life". He became also a member of the board of directors of the "Appeal of Conscience Foundation".

In the aftermath of the devastating Armenian earthquake in December 1988 he coordinated international efforts to mobilize financial and material support to assist Armenians, leading him to co-found the Fund for Armenian Relief together with neurosurgeon Edgar Housepian and builder Kevork Hovnanian.

== Armenian Patriarch of Jerusalem ==
After consecutive 24 years of service in Eastern Diocese, Manoogian was elected 96th Armenian Patriarch of Jerusalem on March, 22. 1990.

When the late Catholicos Vazgen I died on August 19, 1994, Archbishop Torkom was chosen to take responsibility for the Mother See of Holy Etchmiadzin as the Catholical Locum Tenens, a capacity in which he served until the election of the new Supreme Patriarch and Catholicos of All Armenians Karekin I in April 1995.

=== Declining health and death ===
On January 19, 2012, Patriarch Torkom Manoogian was rushed to Hadassah Hospital, with septic shock due to pneumonia. One day after his admission he suffered from cardiac and pulmonary arrest (the heart stopped working because of the severe infection in the lungs that could permit neither oxygenation nor ventilation) and lost consciousness.

On March 14, 2012, Patriarch Torkom Manoogian was transferred to the Franciscan Fathers Infirmary in Jerusalem. In an interview with Archbishop Aris Shirvanian, published on April 11, 2012, Shirvanian stated that, "The Patriarch's condition is grave. He has come out of coma, however remains unconscious and unable to speak. He has lost his ability to speak because his brain was seriously damaged."

Since January 30, 2012, the Grand Sacristan Archbishop Nourhan Manougian was officially assigned to take upon him the tasks of Patriarch.

On October 12, 2012, Patriarch Torkom Manoogian died due to a blood infection caused by a severe pressure bed-sore. He was 93. His official burial ceremony was held in Jerusalem on October 22, 2012. On October 19, Archbishop Aris Shirvanian was elected Locum Tenens, until the election of the new Patriarch.

On January 24, 2013, Archbishop Nourhan Manougian was elected as the 97th Armenian Patriarch of Jerusalem. Within the Armenian Apostolic Church, the Patriarch of Jerusalem is autonomous, and the Patriarchate holds its own jurisdiction.

== Writing and music ==
Manoogian was a musician, a choral conductor, composer, poet and writer. He published poetry under the pen name "Shen Mah", translated the sonnets of William Shakespeare into Armenian, and was an expert on Armenian religious music and on the Armenian liturgical composer Komitas.

Religious titles
Preceded by Yeghishe Derderian	Armenian Patriarch of Jerusalem; 1990–2012	Succeeded by Nourhan Manougian
