= Levon Chorbajian =

American sociologist

Levon Chorbajian (born 1942) is an American sociologist. He is a professor at the University of Massachusetts Lowell. He is the Director of the US section of the Zoryan Institute for Contemporary Armenian Research and Documentation.

An Armenian American, Chorbajian is involved in socialist and progressive politics and is a critic of neoliberalism.

== Bibliography ==
Author

- Egan, Daniel; Chorbajian, Levon (2004). Power: A Critical Reader. Pearson. ISBN 978-0131834385.
- Chorbajian, Levon; Mutafian, Claude; Donabedian, Patrick (1994). The Caucasian Knot: The History and Geopolitics of Nagorno-Karabagh. Zed Books. ISBN 1-85649-287-7.

Editor

- Chorbajian, Levon, ed. (2001). The Making of Nagorno-Karabagh: From Secession to Republic. Palgrave Macmillan. ISBN 978-0333773406.
- Chorbajian, Levon; Shirinian, George, eds. (1999). Studies in Comparative Genocide. Palgrave Macmillan. ISBN 9780312219338.

Translator

- Verluise, Pierre (1995). Armenia in Crisis: The 1988 Earthquake. Levon Chorbajian (translator). Wayne State University Press. ISBN 0814325270.
