= Zareh Mutafian =

Armenian painter (1907–1980)

Zareh Mutafian (Armenian: Զարեհ Մութաֆյան; March 15, 1907 – May 11, 1980) was a French-Armenian painter.

== Biography ==
He was born in Samsun, on the seaside of Black Sea which was then in the Ottoman Empire. Mutafian was the only one in his family who survived in 1915 genocide. In 1927 he entered to Milan Art Academy. In 1939 he moved to Paris.

He is the father of historian Claude Mutafian.

Influenced by Bonnard, Matisse and postimpressionist painters, he regularly displayed his work in exhibitions worldwide, from the 50s to the year of his death, in France, Beyrouth, United States and former Soviet Union. His paintings are gathered in private collections as well as in the National Gallery in Erevan. Besides, he also wrote in armenian several texts and books about the history of painting, esthetics, and issues relative to Armenia (many of which are collected in the french-armenian book Chant d'Arménie, published the year after his death. His most recent exhibition takes place at the Mairie of the 5th Arrondissement of Paris, next to the Place du Panthéon, between May 6 and May 25, 2013.
