= Claude Mutafian =

French mathematician and historian (born 1942)

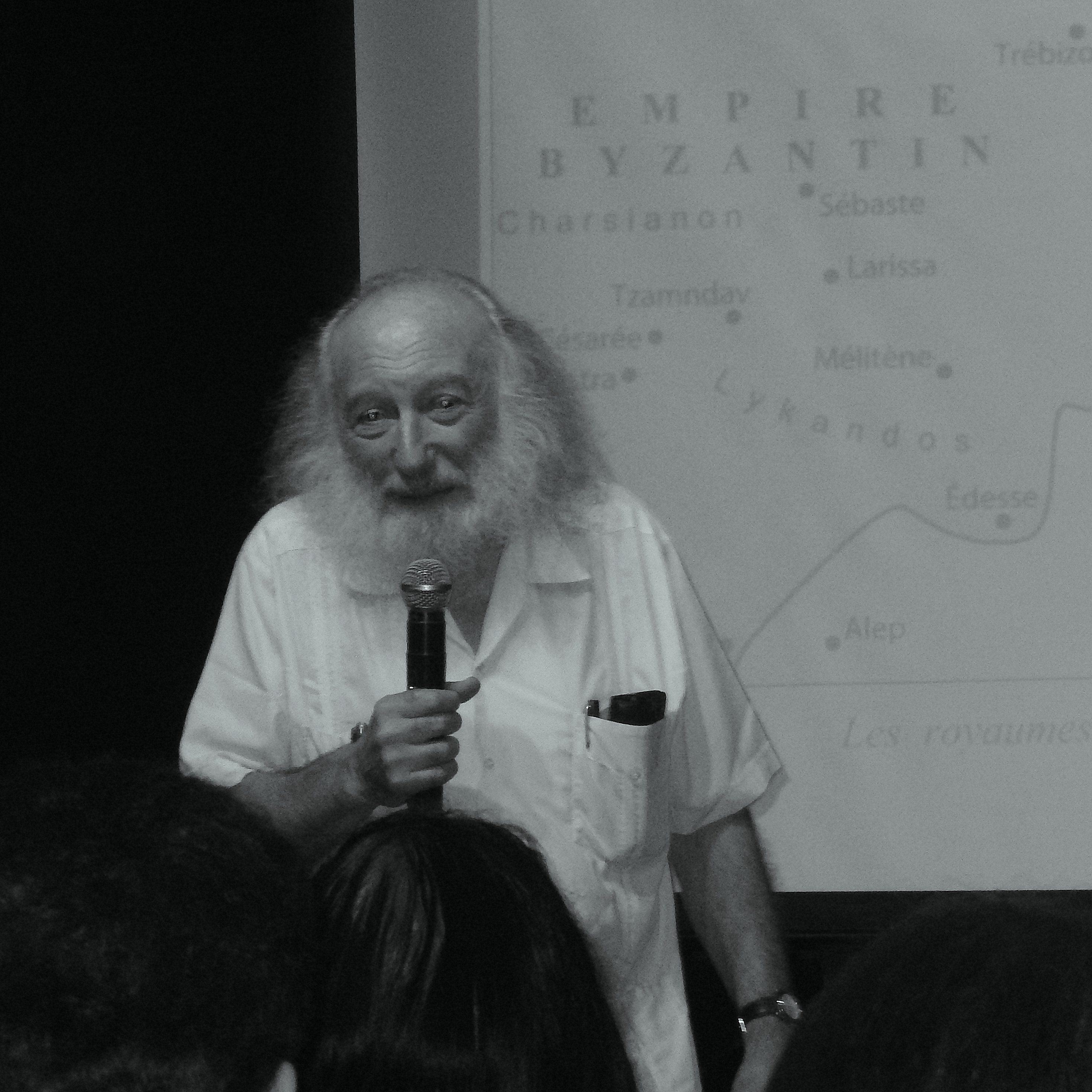
Mutafian in 2014

Armen (Claude) Z. Moutafian (born 21 July 1942) is a French mathematician and a historian who specializes in Armenian history. He is a Foreign Member of Armenian Academy of Sciences. He is the son of Zareh Mutafian.

== Biography ==
Born in 1942 in Clamart, France, Claude Mutafian is an associate professor of mathematics and senior lecturer from the Paris 13 University in Villetaneuse. Following the publication of several books on algebra, Mutafian devoted himself to Armenian history since 1980, particularly to the relations of Armenia with its various neighbors over time. Ph.D. in history from Paris 1 Pantheon-Sorbonne University, Mutafian is the author of several books on the history of Armenia. He played a key role curating the Mardigian Museum of Armenian Art and Culture, which reopened in 2022 in Jerusalem.

== Publications ==
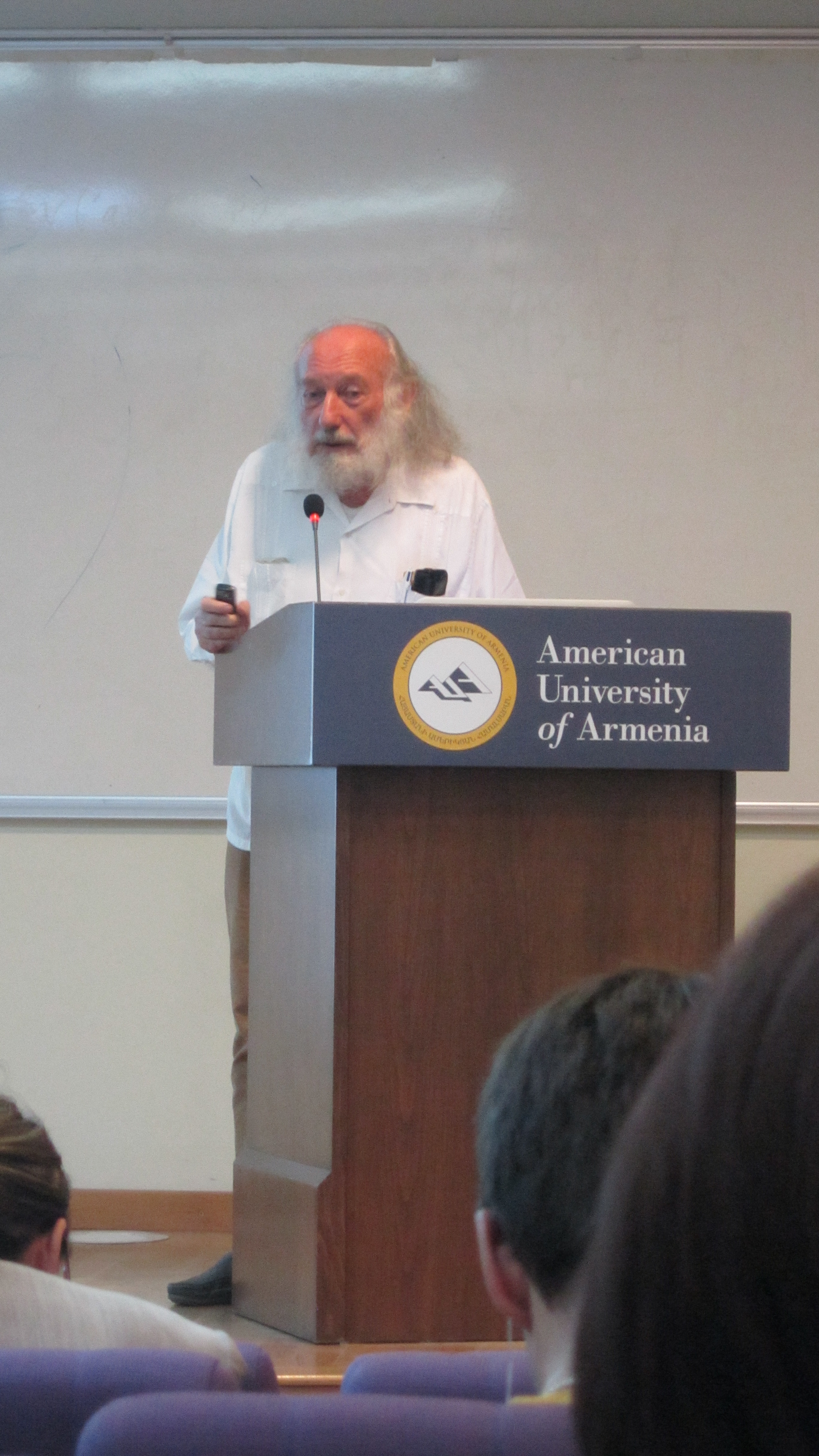
Mutafian in 2016

- Le Défi algébrique, 1976, ISBN 2-7117-2142-6
- La Cilicie au carrefour des empires, tome 1 et 2, 1988, ISBN 2-251-32630-8
- The Caucasian Knot: The History and Geopolitics of Nagorno-Karabagh, 1994, by Levon Chorbajian, Patrick Donabedian, and Claude Mutafian, ISBN 1-85649-287-7
- Atlas historique et culturel de l'Arménie : Proche-Orient et Sud-Caucase du 8e au 20e siècle, 2001, by Claude Mutafian and Eric Van Lauwe, ISBN 2-7467-0100-6
- Le Royaume Arménien de Cilicie, XIIe-XIVe siècle, 2002, ISBN 2-271-05105-3
- Les yeux brûlants, 2006, by Antoine Agoudjian, Claude Mutafian, Raymond-H Kévorkian, and Atom Egoyan, ISBN 2-7427-6133-0
- Arménie : La magie de l'écrit, 2007, ISBN 2-7572-0057-7
- L' Arménie du Levant, 2012, ISBN 9782251444253
