= Harootiun Vehabedian of Jerusalem =

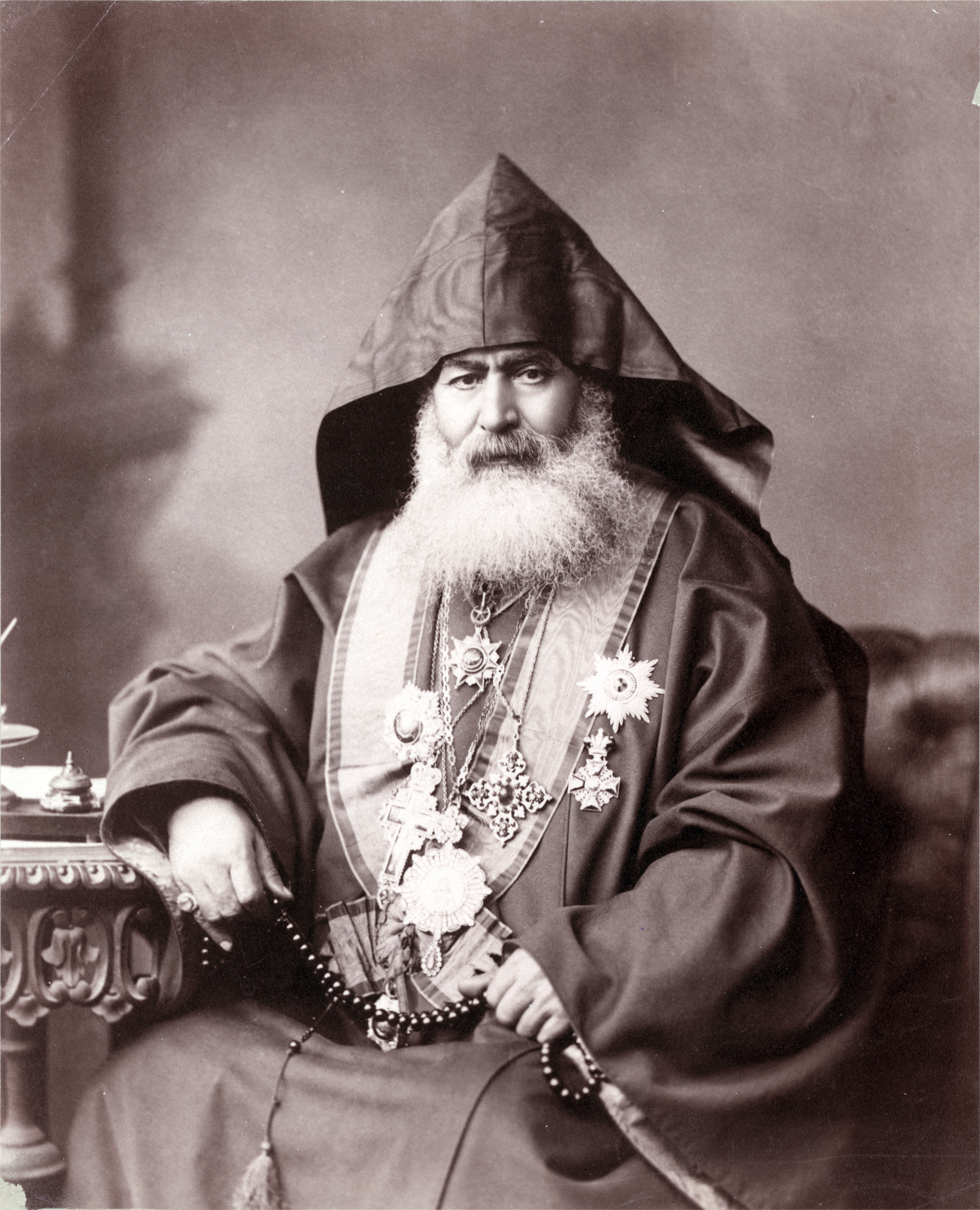
Harootiun Vehabedian, Armenian Patriarch of Jerusalem, 1900 (Library of Congress).

Patriarch Harootiun Vehabedian was elected Armenian Patriarch of Jerusalem in 1885, but he stayed in Istanbul until 1889, before arriving at Jerusalem to receive his post. Meanwhile, Yeremya Der Sahagian acted as locum tenens (caretaker).

Patriarch Vehabedian continued serving until his death in 1910. After this, the position of Armenian Patriarch of Jerusalem remained vacant from 1910 to 1921, when Patriarch Yeghishe Tourian was elected.

Religious titles
Preceded by Esayee IV of Talas and Yeremya Der Sahagian	Armenian Patriarch of Jerusalem; 1885–1910	Succeeded by Yeghishe Tourian in 1921
