= St. Nersess Theological Review =

- Discipline: Armenian studies
- Language: English (abstracts)
- Edited by: Abraham Terian; Roberta R. Ervine

Publication details
- History: 1996 – Present
- Publisher: St. Nersess Armenian Seminary (United States)
- Frequency: Annually (varying frequency)

Standard abbreviations
- ISO 4: St. Nersess Theol. Rev.

Indexing
- ISSN: 1086-2080

Links
- Journal homepage

The St. Nersess Theological Review (abbreviated as SNTR) is an Armenological publication established in 1996 by St. Nersess Armenian Seminary and published both semi-annually and annually over its history.

== Description ==
SNTR publishes articles about Christianity in the Armenian Apostolic Church, which is part of the Oriental Orthodoxy tradition. It is the only English language journal dedicated to the study of Armenian Christianity.

The journal publishes articles related to theology, liturgy, philosophy, ethics, Biblical studies, canon law, church history, ecumenics, literature, fine arts, archaeology, and interdisciplinary studies, as well as translations of Armenian patristic texts. It also publishes short notes, review articles and book reviews in all fields related to the Armenian Church.

Like the associated seminary, the journal takes its namesake from St. Nersess, also known as Nerses IV the Gracious.

== History ==
The founding editor was Abraham Terian who ran the journal from 1996 to 2007. Volume 13 was edited by Roberta R. Ervine when it was published in 2008. After that year, the journal went on an extended hiatus and did not publish volume 14, its most recent volume, until 2023.
