= Torkom Koushagian of Jerusalem =

Armenian Patriarch of Jerusalem

Patriarch Torkom Koushagian (in Armenian Թորգոմ Գուշակեան) (27 December 1874 – 10 February 1939) was Armenian Patriarch of Jerusalem serving the Armenian Patriarchate of Jerusalem from 1931 to 1939.

He was born Mgrdich Koushagian in Bardizag, Ottoman Empire, in 1874. After studies at Armash seminary he was ordained priest on 25 September 1896. He was consecrated bishop on 19 September 1910. From 1914 he was the Armenian Archbishop of Egypt.

He took over the position in Jerusalem after Patriarch Yeghishe Tourian.

He was succeeded in 1939 by Patriarch Mesrob Nishanian.

Oriental Orthodoxy titles
Preceded by Yeghishe Tourian	Armenian Patriarch of Jerusalem; 1931–1939	Succeeded by Mesrob Nishanian
