= Armenian Patriarchate of Jerusalem =

Autonomous Armenian Oriental Orthodox Church in Jerusalem

Coordinates: 31.7744°N 35.2287°E

- Classification: Oriental Orthodox
- Language: Armenian
- Headquarters: Old City of Jerusalem
- Territory: Israel, Palestinian Authority, and Jordan
- Founder: The Apostles Bartholomew and Thaddeus
- Independence: Apostolic Era
- Recognition: By Armenian Apostolic Church as their autonomous church

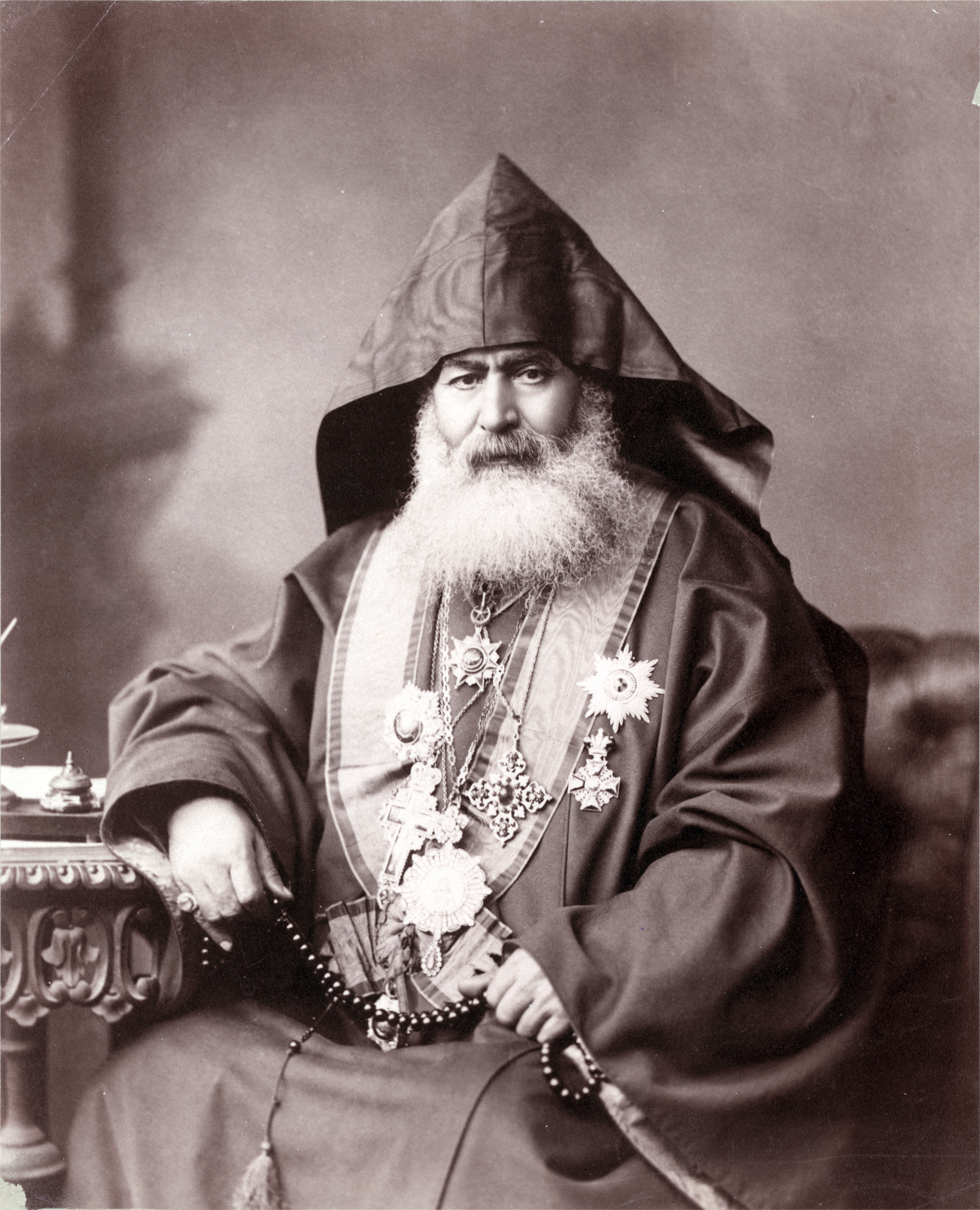
Harootiun Vehabedian, Armenian Patriarch of Jerusalem, 1900

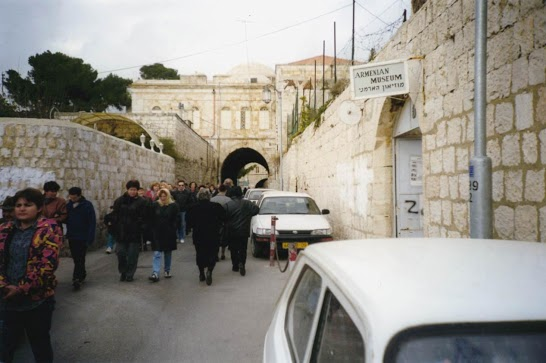
Armenian Orthodox Patriarchate Road

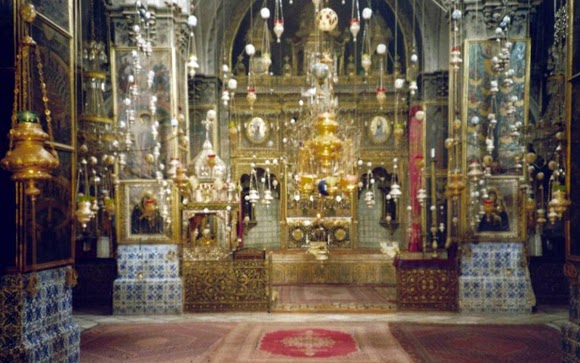
Interior of St. James Cathedral

The Armenian Patriarchate of Jerusalem, also known as the Armenian Patriarchate of Saint James (Armenian: Առաքելական Աթոռ Սրբոց Յակովբեանց Յերուսաղեմ, Aṙak’yelakan At’voṙ Srboc’ Yakovbeanc’ Yerusaġem, lit. 'Apostolic See of Saint James in Jerusalem'), is located in the Armenian Quarter of Jerusalem. The Armenian Apostolic Church is officially recognised under Israel's confessional system, for the self-regulation of status issues, such as marriage and divorce.

Archbishop Nourhan Manougian, previously the Grand Sacristan and the Patriarchal Vicar, became the 97th Armenian Patriarch of Jerusalem on January 24, 2013. Manougian succeeded Archbishop Torkom Manoogian, who died on October 12, 2012, after serving 22 years in the office. The patriarch, along with a synod of seven clergymen elected by the St. James Brotherhood, oversees the patriarchate's operations.

During World War I, survivors of the Armenian genocide received shelter in the Armenian convent in Jerusalem. The Armenian population of Jerusalem reached 25,000 people at that time. But political and economic instability in the region has reduced the Armenian population. Most Armenians in Jerusalem live in and around the Patriarchate at the St. James Monastery, which occupies most of the Armenian Quarter of the Old City. Apart from Jerusalem, there are Armenian communities in Jaffa, Haifa, and Nazareth, and in the Palestinian Territories.

The Jerusalem Armenian community uses the Old Julian calendar, unlike the rest of the Armenian Church, which use the Gregorian calendar.

== History ==
In 638, following the Muslim conquest of Jerusalem from the Byzantine Empire, after Sophronius died and the Greeks did not appoint another bishop for Jerusalem, the Armenian Apostolic Church began appointing its own bishops for Jerusalem. The office has continued, with some interruptions, down to this day. The bishops were later elevated in stature and became patriarchs. The Armenian patriarch is independent and self-governing. The Armenian Patriarch of Jerusalem recognizes the Mother See of Holy Etchmiadzin as having pre-eminent supremacy in all spiritual matters.

After the end of the Crusader period, the Armenian patriarchs sought to establish good relations with the Muslim rulers. The Armenian Patriarch Sarkis I (1281–1313) met the Mamluk governor in Egypt and subsequently returned to his community in Jerusalem, hoping to usher in a period of peace for his people after the Crusades. In the 1340s, the Armenians were permitted to build a wall around their quarter. The Mamluk government also engraved a protective declaration in Arabic on the western entrance to the quarter.

The Armenian quarter in this period kept creating "facts on the ground" by the constant small expansions and consolidations. In the 1380s, Patriarch Krikor IV built a priests' dining room across from St. James' Cathedral. Around 1415, the olive grove on the Mount of Olives, the Garden of Gethsemane, was purchased. In 1439, Armenians were removed by the Greeks from the Golgotha chapel in the Church of the Holy Sepulchre, but the Patriarch Mardiros I (1412–1450) purchased the "opposite area" as compensation, and named it Second Golgotha. This remains in the patriarch's possession to this day. Because of the rights of the Armenian Church on the Golgotha Chapel, in the afternoon processions in the Holy Sepulcher, the Armenian Church has liturgy there.

At times, the Armenian Patriarchate of Jerusalem became politicized by struggles within the Armenian Church. The Armenian Patriarchate, due to its proximity to the holy places and isolation from the main Armenian population, played an important role in the schism that began to affect the Armenian leaderships in Constantinople and Etchmiadzin (seat of the Armenian church). Significantly, Bishop Eghiazar assumed the Armenian Patriarchate of Jerusalem and in 1644 declared himself for a short period of time as catholicos (leader) of all the Armenian church.

In the 17th century, the Armenians were allowed, after much pleading, to enlarge the St. James Monastery. At the same time, the Armenian Patriarch Hovhannes VII purchased a large parcel of land south of the St. James Cathedral, called Cham Tagh. By 1752, the patriarchate was busy renovating the entire quarter, and in 1828, further renovations took place after an earthquake. In 1850, the seminary complex at the south end of the St. James convent was completed.

In 1833, the Armenians established the city's first printing press and opened a theological seminary in 1843. In 1866, the Armenians inaugurated the first photographic studio and their first newspaper in Jerusalem. In 1908, the Armenian community built two large buildings on the north-western side of the Old City, along Jaffa Street.

As the Armenian diaspora spread throughout Europe and America, wealthy Armenians donated generously for the prosperity and continuity of the patriarchate. The oil magnate and philanthropist Calouste Gulbenkian came to endow the Gulbenkian Library in the Armenian quarter that was named in gratitude in his name, today holding one of the great collections of ancient Armenian manuscripts, including many copies of the various firmans, Ottoman edicts that granted the quarter protection and rights under Muslim rule.

By the 1920s, most of the Armenian quarter had European-style gable roofs, as opposed to the domes preferred in the Muslim quarter. In 1922, Armenians made up 8% of Jerusalem's Christians, bringing their total number to about 2,480 people. It is also noted that non-Armenians found comfort in the protection of the walled Armenian compound. In the 1930s and 1940s, the Armenian quarter saw further renovations.

The end of World War II also brought the division of Mandate Palestine and the establishment in 1948 of Israel. The number of Armenians residing at the time in the Holy Land totaled about 8,000. The Armenians who lived in Haifa and Jaffa, which became part of Israel, got Israeli citizenship; whereas the huge majority of Palestinian Armenians lived in the Armenian Quarter, and the Armenian Patriarchate and its properties came under Jordanian rule.

The Armenian community was further reduced after the 1967 Six-Day War, Naksa, occupation, with many emigrating to Jordan and some to Europe and the United States, leaving around 2,000–3,000 in Jerusalem and the West Bank.

== Patriarchal complex ==
The Armenian Patriarchate of Jerusalem is the home of the Brotherhood of St. James, a monastic order of the Armenian Apostolic Church with about 60 members worldwide. Within the compound of the patriarchate also lie the private residences of Armenian families.

This residential enclave was, at one time, the largest single compound that housed Armenians and represented the demographic and spiritual core of Armenian presence in the Holy Land.

The compound of the patriarchate, which enforces a strict curfew of 10 p.m., when the massive doors are closed and locked until the early morning, also houses the administrative offices and residences of the patriarch and the clergy. It also comprises:

- The Cathedral of St. James;
- The Church of the Archangels, another important Armenian church in Jerusalem;
- The Church of St. Toros, which is home to the precious illuminated Armenian manuscript collection, the second largest in the world (over 4,000).

Other buildings of the patriarchate located within the compound include:

- The Theological Seminary of the Patriarchate, a complex located a hundred yards from the entrance of the compound, a gift of the late Armenian-American philanthropists Alex Manoogian and his wife Marie Manoogian. Armenian youths from all over the world, including the United States and Armenia, come to study for the priesthood here, and after ordination, help infuse new blood into the ranks of Armenian clergy worldwide.
- The Calouste Gulbenkian Library, with over 100,000 volumes, half in Armenian and the rest in English and other European languages. The library is named after its benefactor Calouste Gulbenkian.
- The Edward and Helen Mardigian Museum of Armenian Art and Culture, housing historical and religious artifacts, including rugs, Armenian coins, and evidence of the presence at the site of the Tenth Legion of Rome. It is named after its benefactor Edward Mardigian.
- Sts. Tarkmanchatz School (Սուրբ Թարգմանչաց, lit. 'School of the Holy Translators'), a leading co-educational private school and the only one that teaches Armenian, Hebrew, English and Arabic.

== Other facilities ==
Outside of the compound (just across the city wall) are the Monastery of Saint Saviour and an Armenian cemetery.

=== Printing press and media ===
The patriarchate also runs a printing press, the first to be established in Jerusalem, which has now become capable of undertaking commercial color printing. This was the first facility within the Armenian compound to adopt the concept of computerization on a dedicated scale.

The official organ of the patriarchate is the long-running periodical Sion (Սիոն), named after the Armenian name for Mount Zion. The students in the seminary also publish their own official organ: Hay Yerusaghem (Հայ Երուսաղէմ, lit. 'Armenian Jerusalem').

=== Medical services ===
Medical services against a symbolic fee are provided at a clinic donated by the Jinishian Medical Fund.

Free meals to aged and invalid pensioners and indigent members of the community are also provided.

== Jurisdiction ==
The patriarchate enjoys a semi-diplomatic status and is one of the three major guardians of the Christian holy places in the Holy Land (the other two being the Greek Orthodox and Latin patriarchates). Among these sites under joint control of the Armenian Patriarchate and other churches, chapels, and holy places are:

- The Church of the Holy Sepulchre in the Old City, Jerusalem,
- The Chapel of the Ascension on the Mount of Olives,
- The Tomb of the Virgin Mary next to Gethsemane,
- The Church of the Nativity in Bethlehem.

The Armenian Patriarchate also has jurisdiction over the Armenian Apostolic (Orthodox) communities in Israel, Jordan, and Palestine. The Armenian churches with full jurisdiction are:

- The Saint Elias Church in Haifa
- The Saint Nicholas Church in Jaffa
- The Saint George Monastery in Ramle
- The St. Thaddeus Armenian Church in Amman, Jordan

== See also ==
- List of Armenian Patriarchs of Jerusalem

== Sources ==
- Stopka, Krzysztof (2016). Armenia Christiana: Armenian Religious Identity and the Churches of Constantinople and Rome (4th–15th century). Kraków: Jagiellonian University Press. ISBN 9788323395553.
