= List of foreign politicians of Armenian origin =

This article contains a list of Wikipedia articles about politicians in countries outside Armenia who are of Armenian origin.

== Heads of state and heads of government ==
This is a list of former and current heads of state and heads of government of states (sovereign or otherwise) who were/are of full or partial Armenian origin.

Portrait	Name	Country	Position(s)	Ref
	Damat Halil Pasha	Ottoman Empire	Grand vizier (1616–19, 1626–28)	
	Ermeni Süleyman Pasha	Ottoman Empire	Grand vizier (1655–56)	
	Mohammad Beg	Safavid dynasty	Grand Vizier (1654–1661)	
	László Lukács	Hungary	Prime Minister of the Kingdom of Hungary (1912–1913)	
	Nubar Pasha	Egypt	Prime Minister of Egypt (1878–79, 1884–88, 1894–95)	
	Stepan Shaumian	Baku Commune	Chairman of the Baku Council of People's Commissars (1918)	
	Alexander Miasnikian	Socialist Soviet Republic of Byelorussia	First Secretary of the Communist Party of Byelorussia (1918–19); Chairman of the Central Executive Committee (1919)	
	Levon Mirzoyan	Kazakh Soviet Socialist Republic	First Secretary of the Communist Party of Kazakhstan (1937–38)	
	Ferenc Szálasi	Hungary	Leader of the Nation of Hungary (1944–45)	
	Anastas Mikoyan	Soviet Union	Chairman of the Presidium of the Supreme Soviet (1964–65)	
	George Deukmejian	United States	Governor of California (1983–91)	
	Édouard Balladur	France	Prime Minister of France (1993–95)	
	Zurab Zhvania	Georgia	Prime Minister of Georgia (2004–05)	
	Émile Lahoud	Lebanon	President of Lebanon (1998–2007)	
	Gladys Berejiklian	Australia	Premier of New South Wales (2017–2021)	

== Austria ==
- Dawid Abrahamowicz - Member of the Imperial Council of Austria

== Australia ==
- Joe Hockey (Family Name "Hokeidonian") - Member of Federal Parliament Shadow Treasurer
- Gladys Berejiklian - Member of Parliament, Premier of NSW
- Clr Sarkis Yedelian - Deputy Mayor of Ryde, New South Wales.
- Clr. Artin Etmekdjian. JP - Mayor (2010-2012) - City of Ryde, New South Wales

== Brazil ==
- Stepan Nercessian - Federal Deputy and Councilman of Rio de Janeiro
- Pedro Pedrossian - 41st Governor of Mato Grosso and 4th, 7th Governor of Mato Grosso do Sul

== Bulgaria ==
- Raya Nazaryan - Speaker of the National Assembly

== Canada ==
- Andre Arthur – former Independent Conservative MP, 2006–2011, talk radio host
- Sarkis Assadourian – former Liberal MP, 1993–2004
- Ann Cavoukian – former Information and Privacy Commissioner of Ontario
- Harout Chitilian – city councilor and chairman of the City Council of Montreal
- Raymond Setlakwe – entrepreneur, politician, lawyer
- Michelle Setlakwe – politician, lawyer

== Cyprus ==
- Marios Garoyian - President of Cypriot Parliament

== Egypt ==
- Boghos Nubar, son of Nubar Pasha, politician and co-founder of the Armenian General Benevolent Union
- Nubar Pasha, first Prime Minister of Egypt
- Al-Afdal Shahanshah, vizier of the Fatimid caliphs of Egypt
- Boghos Bey Yusufian, Egypt's Minister of Commerce, Minister of Foreign Affairs, and secretary of Muhammad Ali Pasha
- Badr al-Jamali, military commander and statesman for the Fatimid Caliphate under Caliph al-Mustansir
- Shajar al-Durr, (possibly) wife of As-Salih Ayyub, and later of Izz al-Din Aybak, the first sultan of the Mamluk Bahri dynasty
- Tigrane Pasha, ninth Foreign Minister of Egypt

== France ==
- Édouard Balladur - Former Prime Minister of France
- Emmanuel Macron - President of France
- Patrick Devedjian - French Minister
- Jean Pierre Asvazadourian - French Ambassador to Argentina
- Guillaume Kasbarian - Minister of Civil Service, Streamlining, and Public Sector Transformation
- Antoine Armand - Minister of the Economy, Finance, Industrial and Digital Sovereignty
- Jacques Marilossian - Member of the National Assembly for Hauts-de-Seine's 7th constituency
- Jeanne Barseghian - Mayor of Strasbourg
- Danièle Cazarian - French politician of La République En Marche! served as a member of the French National Assembly
- Astrid Panosyan - Minister of Labor and Employment
- Nadia Essayan - Member of the National Assembly for Cher's 2nd constituency
- Georges Képénékian - Mayor of Lyon

== Hungary ==
- László Lukács - Prime Minister of Hungary
- György Lukács - Minister of Religion and Education of Hungary

== India ==
- Mirza Zulqarnain - diwan and faujdar of Mughal Empire
- Abdul Hai - Chief justice of Mughal Empire

== Iran ==
- Dadarsi, general and satrap of Bactria
- Mohammad Beg, Grand Vizier of the Safavid Iran
- Safiqoli Khan, Governor of Baghdad and Hamadan
- Markar Khan Davidkhanian, Minister of Finance of Qajar Iran
- Set Khan Astvatsatourian, Ambassador of Iran to the Court of St James's
- Mirza Malkam Khan, Ambassador of Iran to Austria, United Kingdom, Germany and Italy
- Hovhannes Masehyan, Ambassador of Iran to Japan, United Kingdom and Germany

== Lebanon ==
- Émile Lahoud – Former President of Lebanon
- Karim Pakradouni – Ex-Minister, former President of Phalange (Kataeb) Party
- Hagop Pakradounian – Member of Parliament

== Mexico ==
- Arturo Sarukhán - Mexican ambassador to the US

== Moldova ==
- Mark Tkachuk - Member of the Moldovan Parliament

== New Zealand ==
- Sian Elias - Chief Justice of New Zealand
- Doug Zohrab - New Zealand's Ambassador to the UN, Germany, Switzerland, and Austria

== Palestine ==
- Manuel Hassassian - Palestinian ambassador to the United Kingdom
- Varsen Aghabekian - Minister of State for Foreign Affairs and Expatriates

== Romania ==
- Vasile Morțun - President of the Assembly of Deputies, Minister of Internal Affairs
- Basile M. Missir - President of the Senate of Romania
- Varujan Vosganian - Finance minister of Romania
- Iacob Zadig - general

== Russia ==
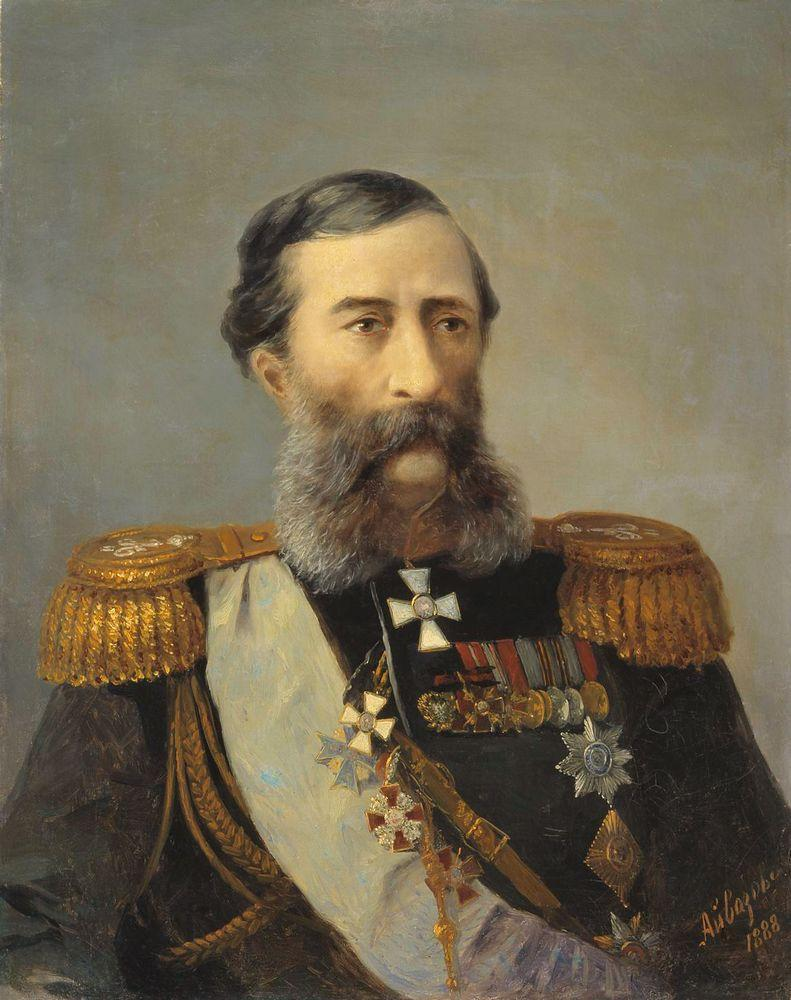
Mikhail Loris-Melikov

- Ivan Delyanov - Chamberlain, of Russian Empire
- Sergey Lavrov - Minister of Foreign Affairs
- Mikhail Loris-Melikov - Minister of Interior of the Russian Empire
- Margarita Simonyan - Editor-in-Chief of RT (Russia Today)
- Andranik Migranyan - former director of the Institute for Democracy and Cooperation, New York
- Gennadiy Melikyan - former First Deputy Chairman of Central Bank of Russia
- Sergey Grigorov - former Head of Federal Agency of Export Control
- Sergey Oganesyan - former Head of Federal Energy Agency
- Artur Chilingarov - deputy (1993-2011 and since 2016) and Deputy Chairman (2000–11) of State Duma and former member of Federation Council of Russia (2011–14)
- Vladimir Jabbarov - member of Federation Council of Russia
- Aleksandr Ter Avanesov - former member of Federation Council of Russia (2006-2015)
- Ohanes Oganyan - former deputy of State Duma (2011–16) and former member of Federation Council of Russia (2001–11)
- Levon Chakmakhcyan - former member of Federation Council of Russia
- Semyen Bagdasarov - former deputy of State Duma
- Ashot Yegiazaryan - former deputy of State Duma
- Arkadiy Sarkisyan - former deputy of State Duma
- Stepan Shorshorov - former deputy of State Duma
- Igor Khankoev - former deputy of State Duma
- Ashot Sarkisyan - former deputy of State Duma

== Sweden ==
- Esabelle Dingizian - Member of Riksdag
- Murad Artin - Member of Riksdag

== Turkmenistan ==
- Boris Şyhmyradow - Foreign Minister of Turkmenistan

== Turkey ==
=== Ottoman Empire ===
- Şivekar Sultan - Haseki Sultan of the Ottoman Empire
- Artin Dadyan Pasha - Deputy Secretary of State for Foreign Affairs
- Hagop Kazazian - Minister of Finance
- Garabet Artin Davoudian - First Mutasarrif of the Mount Lebanon Mutasarrifate
- Ohannes Kouyoumdjian - Mutasarrif of the Mount Lebanon Mutasarrifate
- Gabriel Noradoungian - Ottoman Minister of Foreign Affairs
- Vartkes Serengülian - Member of Ottoman Parliament
- Mikael Portukal Pasha - Pasha
- Vartan Pasha - Pasha
- Damat Halil Pasha - Grand vizier of the Ottoman Empire
- Ermeni Süleyman Pasha - Grand vizier of the Ottoman Empire

=== Turkish Republic ===
- Garo Paylan - Member of Parliament of Turkey
- Selina Özuzun Doğan - Member of Parliament of Turkey
- Markar Esayan - Member of Parliament of Turkey

== Ukraine ==
- Karekin Arutyunov - Member People's Deputy of Ukraine, member of Yulia Tymoshenko Bloc, member of "Bat'kivshchina" party.
- Arsen Avakov - Interior minister of Ukraine
- Oksana Markarova - Ambassador of Ukraine to the United States

== United Kingdom ==
- Alexander Raphael - Member of Parliament for St Albans and Carlow
- Paul Chater - Senior Unofficial Member of the Executive Council of British Hong Kong
- Ara Darzi, Baron Darzi of Denham - Parliamentary Under-Secretary of State for Health (2007-2009)

== Uruguay ==
- Liliam Kechichián, Minister of Tourism

== Soviet Union ==
- Varlam Avanesov
- Abel Aganbegyan
- Stepan Akopov
- Alexander Bekzadyan
- Avetik Burnazyan
- Artur Chilingarov
- Yakov Davydov
- Leonid Kostandov
- Vsevolod Merkulov
- Anastas Mikoyan
- Levon Mirzoyan
- Alexander Miasnikian
- Ruben Rubenov
- Andranik Petrosyants
- Suren Shadunts
- Stepan Shaumian
- Georgy Shakhnazarov
- Lev Karakhan
- Grigory Korganov
- Hayk Kotanjian
- Ivan Tevosian
- Yuri Osipyan

== See also ==
- List of Armenians
