= Armenians in Turkey =

Ethnic group

Armenians in Turkey Türkiye Ermenileri
Թուրքահայեր

Total population
- 40,000-50,000 (excluding crypto-Armenians and Hemshin Armenians)

Regions with significant populations
- Istanbul, Diyarbakır, Kayseri, Mardin, Şanlıurfa, Vakıflı, Tercan, and Iskenderun, Tunceli, Kars, Iğdır, Van, Erzurum, Adana, Kahramanmaraş, Ankara, Erzincan

Languages
- Turkish (majority), Western Armenian (minority)

Religion
- Predominantly Christianity (Armenian Apostolic) with Armenian Catholic, Armenian Evangelical, and Muslim minorities.

Armenians in Turkey (Turkish: Türkiye Ermenileri; Armenian: Թուրքահայեր or Թրքահայեր, T’urk’ahayer, 'Turkish Armenians'), one of the indigenous peoples of Turkey, have an estimated population of 40,000 to 50,000 today, down from a population of almost 2 million Armenians between the years 1914 and 1921. Today, the overwhelming majority of Turkish Armenians are concentrated in Istanbul. They support their own newspapers, churches and schools, and the majority belong to the Armenian Apostolic faith and a minority of Armenians in Turkey belong to the Armenian Catholic Church, the Armenian Evangelical Church, or are Muslim. They are not considered part of the Armenian diaspora, since they have been living in their historical homeland for more than four thousand years.

Until the Armenian genocide of 1915, most of the Armenian population of Turkey (then the Ottoman Empire) lived in the eastern parts of the country that Armenians call Western Armenia (roughly corresponding to the modern Eastern Anatolia region).

Armenians are one of the four ethnic minorities officially recognized in Turkey, together with Jews, Greeks, and Bulgarians.

In addition to local ethnic Armenians who are Turkish citizens, there are also many recent immigrants from Armenia in Istanbul. There is also an unknown number of officially Muslim citizens of the Republic of Türkiye who have recently started to identify as Armenians based on their Armenian roots, after being Islamised decades or centuries earlier. They are referred as Hidden Armenians or crypto-Armenians.

== History ==
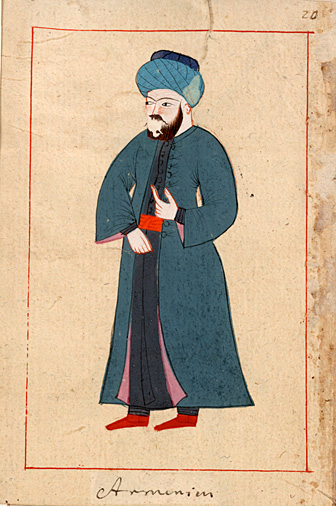
Picture of Armenian from the Ralamb Costume Book, 1657

Armenians living in Turkey today are a remnant of what was once a much larger community that existed for thousands of years, long before the establishment of the Sultanate of Rum. Estimates for the number of Armenian citizens of the Ottoman Empire in the decade before World War I range between 1.3 (official Ottoman data) and 3 million (independent estimates).

When Constantinople finally became part of the Ottoman Empire, financial support was given to the Apostolic Church by the Sultan, so it could build churches in the city, which prior to that the Byzantines refused as they viewed the church as heretical. Armenians in the Ottoman Empire were viewed as a separate millet, and given the status of second-class citizens, but were not usually mistreated until later in the empire's history. Many Armenians gained significant positions in the empire in professions such as banking, which they almost had a monopoly in. The oldest Turkish company, Zildjian, was founded by an Armenian in the 17th century.

Starting in the late 19th century, political instability, dire economic conditions, and continuing ethnic tensions prompted the emigration of as many as 100,000 Armenians to Europe, the Americas and the Middle East. This massive exodus from the Ottoman Empire is what started the modern Armenian diaspora worldwide.

There was conflict between Armenians, Turks and Kurds between 1892 and 1915. The Armenian genocide followed in 1915–1916 until 1918, during which the Ottoman government of the time ordered the deportation. These measures affected an estimated 75–80% of all the Armenians living in the Ottoman Empire during World War I. Many died directly, while others died as a result of dehydration, disease, and starvation during the death marches.

Many of the remaining Armenians in the East found refuge by 1917–1918 in the Caucasus and within the areas controlled by the newly established Democratic Republic of Armenia. They never returned to their original homes in today's Eastern Turkey (composed of six vilayets, Erzurum, Van, Bitlis, Diyarbakır, Mamuretülaziz, and Sivas).

Their descendants are known as Hidden Armenians and are present throughout Western Armenia, but particularly in Dersim (Tunceli). Through the 20th century, an unknown number of Armenians living in the mountainous region of Dersim converted to Alevism. During the Armenian genocide, many of the Armenians in the region were saved by their Kurdish neighbors. According to Mihran Prgiç Gültekin, the head of the Union of Dersim Armenians, around 75% of the population of Dersim are "converted Armenians." He reported in 2012 that over 200 families in Tunceli have declared their Armenian descent, but others are afraid to do so. In April 2013, Aram Ateşyan, the acting Armenian Patriarch of Constantinople, stated that 90% of Tunceli's population is of Armenian origin.

Most of the Armenian survivors from Cilicia and the southernmost areas with Armenians like Diyarbakır ended up in northern Syria and the Middle East. All those who survived the death camps in/deportations to Deir ez-Zor ended up there as well. Armenians deported from areas that were under allied control by 1918, particularly the short lived French Mandate, which had control of southeastern Turkey and all of Cilicia according to the Sykes–Picot Agreement, were able to return to their homes to gather things or search for loved ones. After the fall of French Cilicia, Some of those returnees attempted to stay permanently after the Turks gained the territory back, but were all driven away by the early 1930s due to various reasons. Those who left the Mandate ended up in Syria, France, Armenia, the Americas and the rest of Europe. The Armenian population suffered a final blow with ongoing massacres and atrocities throughout the period 1920–1923, during the Turkish War of Independence. Those suffering the most were those Armenians remaining in the east and the south of Turkey, and the Pontic Greeks in the Black Sea Region.

By the end of the 1920s, only a sprinkling of non-converted Armenians left in Turkey were scattered sparsely throughout the country, with the only viable Armenian population remaining in Istanbul and its environs, Diyarbakir and Malatya, with those largely disappearing due to the Turkey-PKK War necessitating their migration to Istanbul. At the time of the establishment of the Republic of Turkey, Hatay Province was part of Syria, and is why that area still has some established and officially recognized Armenian communities.

== Demographics ==
Armenian-speaking population in Turkey
Year	As first language	As second language	Total	Turkey's population	% of total speakers
1927	67,745	–	67,745	13,629,488	0.50
1935	57,599	9,782	67,381	16,157,450	0.42
1945	47,728	12,354	60,082	18,790,174	0.32
1950	52,776	9,322	62,098	20,947,188	0.30
1955	56,235	6,084	62,319	24,064,763	0.26
1960	52,756	19,444	72,200	27,754,820	0.26
1965	33,094	22,260	55,354	31,391,421	0.18

Due to the Armenian Genocide and other events in Turkey during the last century, many Turkish Armenians were killed, forced into hiding, and forcibly converted to Islam, which split them into three potentially overlapping groups: Armenian Christians, Crypto Armenians, and Muslim Armenians. Christian Armenians are usually part of the recognized minority, but the group includes Crypto Armenians who identify as both Armenian and Christian, and Armenian immigrants to Turkey. Crypto Armenians are Armenians who are legally identified as Turks and are either overtly Christian, practice Crypto-Christianity, or practice Islam. Muslim Armenians may openly identify as Armenian, be Crypto Armenians, or may not know about their ethnicity at all.

The combined total of all Armenians in Turkey is unknown, with numbers ranging from as low as 30,000 to several million. However, the combined total of immigrant Armenians and those in the recognized minority is estimated at 150–170,000. In addition, there are 95,000 members of the Armenian Patriarchate of Constantinople.

=== Armenian Christians ===
The officially recognized Armenian Christian population is estimated to be between 50,000 and 70,000, mostly living in Istanbul and its environs. They are almost always members of the Armenian Apostolic, Armenian Catholic or Armenian Evangelical churches. The number of Armenian Christians is both diminishing due to emigration to Europe, the Americas and Australia, and increasing due to immigrants from Armenia looking for work (who are entirely Christian), and Crypto-Armenians who decide to identify openly as Armenians and convert to Christianity. However, most of that growth is not reflected in official data, because Crypto-Armenians are not listed as part of the recognized Armenian minority due to Turkish laws on the officially recognized (Armenians, Greeks, and Jews) minorities, which doesn't allow newly identified Armenians to change their Turkish identities they were given at birth. As for Armenian immigrants, most are unable to join the minority because they are illegal immigrants. Due to those factors, the de jure number of Armenian Christians is much lower than the de facto amount.

The Armenian minority is recognized as a separate "millet" in the Turkish system and has its own religious, cultural, social and educational institutions along with a distinct media. The Turkish Armenian community struggles to keep its own institutions, media and schools open due to diminishing demand from emigration and quite considerable economic sacrifices.

==== Immigration from Armenia ====
The Christian Armenian presence in Turkey is reinforced by a constant flow of mostly illegal immigrants from Armenia who settle in Turkey in search of better job opportunities, where the difference in pay can be quite significant. Despite a negative public opinion in Armenia of "an Armenian who works for a Turk", by 2010 Turkish officials estimated there were between 22,000 and 25,000 Armenian citizens living illegally in Istanbul alone, and 100,000 living illegally in all of Turkey. Conversely, in 2009 the researcher Alin Ozinian estimated the number of Armenians living illegally in Turkey to be 12,000 to 13,000. Aris Nalci, a journalist working for the newspaper Agos, gave a similar estimate in 2010 of between 12,000 and 14,000.

Many of them are employed in Turkish households to provide domestic services, such as cooking and cleaning. In a 2009 interview poll of 150 Armenian migrant workers, the majority of respondents were women from the Shirak Province, in Northwest Armenia. In 2010, amid Armenia's push for the recognition of the 1915 Armenian genocide as a genocide, Prime Minister Erdoğan threatened to deport the illegal immigrants back to Armenia, however the situation gradually thawed. Some Armenian immigrants do not discuss ever returning to their homeland having adapted to life in Turkey. Beginning in 2011, children of the Armenian citizens living illegally in Istanbul have been allowed to attend local Armenian minority schools, but as they are not Turkish citizens, they do not receive diplomas at the end of the school term.

==== Regions with Armenian Christians ====
===== Istanbul =====
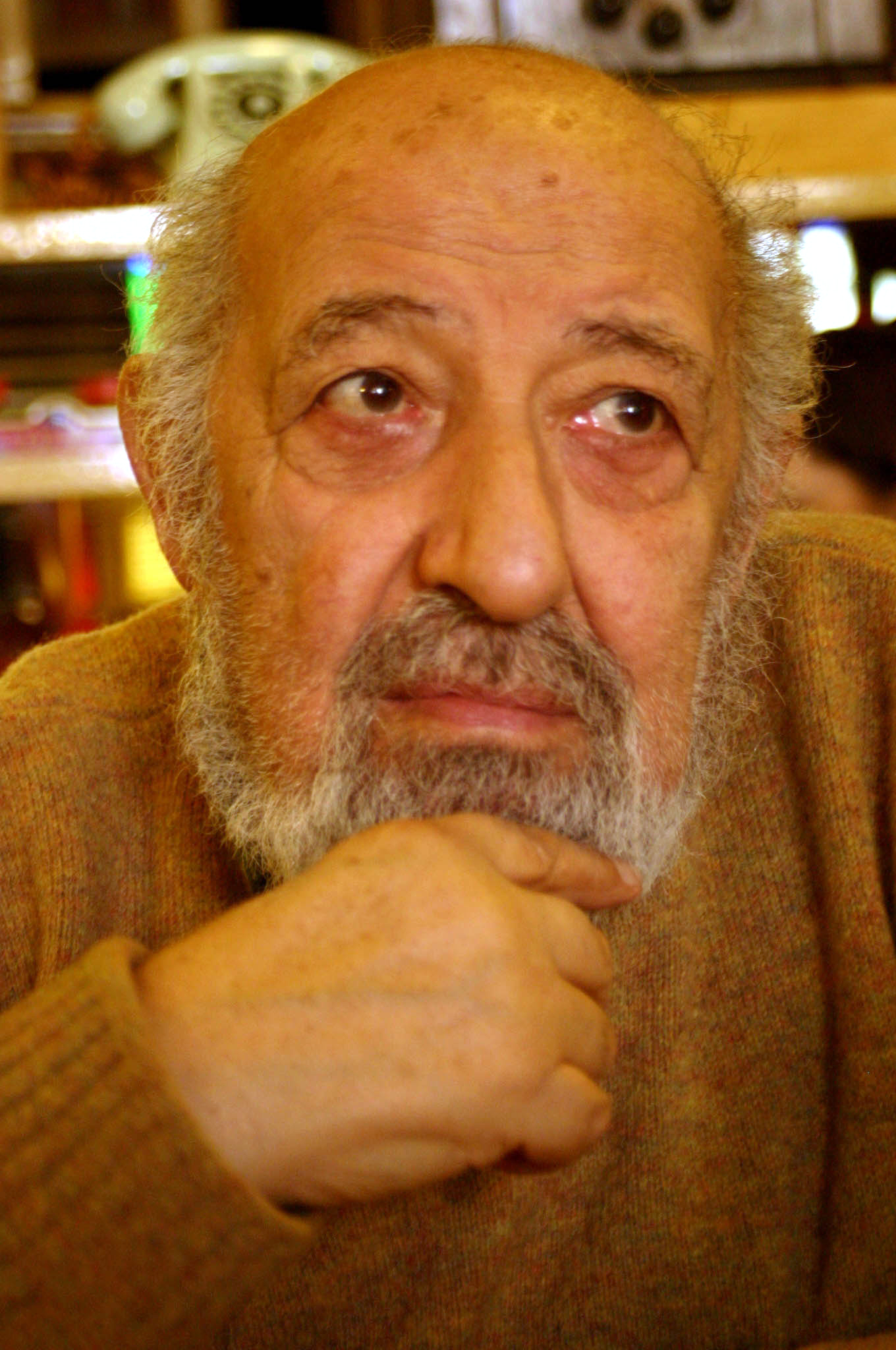
Ara Güler was an Armenian-Turkish photojournalist, nicknamed "the Eye of Istanbul".

The Armenian community of Istanbul is the largest in Turkey, a catalyst being due to the fact that it was the only place that Armenian Christians were at least somewhat protected at the time of the creation of Turkey post Armenian genocide. Other factors included the Patriarchate having its headquarters in the city, and the city's economy and quality of life attracting Armenian immigrants which allowed for the community to keep stable numbers in the face of discrimination and constant migration.

The three main areas where Armenians live in Istanbul are the Kumkapı quarter, Yeşilköy and Pangalti neighborhoods, as well as the Prince Islands. Kumkapi is the location of the Armenian Patriarchate of Constantinople, and is known for its many fish restaurants and historic Churches. Kumkapi is mostly Apostolic, Pangalti has a mix of Armenian and Roman Catholic populations, and Yesilköy is mostly Armenian Catholic, Roman Catholic and Syriac Orthodox. Kumkapi is also located in the Old city (Fatih), while Pangalti is in the newer part, and Yesilköy is a neighborhood within Greater Istanbul next to the outer walls of the Fatih District.

===== Hatay Province =====
Iskenderun has one small Armenian church, and a community of a few dozen Armenians.

Vakıflı Köyü (Armenian: Վաքիֆ — Vakif) is the only remaining fully ethnic Armenian village in Turkey. It is located on the slopes of Musa Dagh in the Samandağ district of Hatay Province, the village overlooks the Mediterranean Sea and is within eyesight of the Syrian border. As of 2007, it is home to a community of about 130 Turkish-Armenians, and around 300 people who are from the village who come back to visit during the summer.

Vakıflı Köyü and 6 other villages managed to resist the Armenian genocide in the Musa Dagh Defense. However, after the Hatay province was invaded and annexed by Turkey in 1939, most of the other Armenian Christian populations in the other 6 villages were resettled in Lebanon.

===== Diyarbakir Province =====
Diyarbakir (or Amida/Tigranakert) has three operating Armenian churches as of 2015– one Apostolic, one Catholic, and one Protestant- the second-highest amount in any city in Turkey (following Instabul). The city's modern Armenian community was established in the 1920s and 30s when most of the Armenians in the surrounding areas consolidated by moving to Diyarbakir, forming a community consisting of 30 families in the 1980s in the district of Sur.

When the Apostolic church in Diyarbakir was restored in 2011 after years of abandonment, several thousand people came to celebrate mass, including diasporans. In 2017, the Southeastern third of Sur district was leveled due to being occupied by Kurdish Insurgents. The Armenian Church was raided by what is suspected to be Grey Wolves after most of the residents of Sur were forced to leave, and the district was occupied by the Turkish Army. This part of the district is being rebuilt and resold to Turkish and foreign investors.

=== Muslim Armenians ===
==== Hemshins ====
Also in Turkey are the Hopa Hemshinli (also designated occasionally as eastern Hemshinli in publications) are Sunni Muslims of Armenian origin and culture who converted to Islam during Ottoman and earlier rule, and mostly live in the Hopa and Borçka counties of Turkey's Artvin Province. In addition to Turkish, they speak a dialect of western Armenian they call "Homshetsma" or "Hemşince" in Turkish.

=== Other Armenians ===
==== Crypto Armenians ====
"Hidden Armenians" and "crypto-Armenians" are umbrella terms to describe people in Turkey "of full or partial ethnic Armenian origin who generally conceal their Armenian identity from wider Turkish society." They are descendants of Armenians in Turkey who were Islamized and Turkified under the threat of either death, displacement, loss of property or a combination of those during the Armenian genocide. Some methods of this conversion were orphans being taken in by Muslim families, Armenian women being taken as wives by soldiers, as well as entire families converting.

Many Crypto Armenians are totally unaware of their Armenian ethnicity, living as Turks or Kurds, while others know they are Armenian but hide it out of fear of discrimination.

Some Crypto Armenians practice Crypto-Christianity, masquerading as Muslims, while others genuinely practice Islam. Many Crypto Armenians who later re-claim their Armenian identity choose to be baptized and openly practice Christianity, while others continue practicing Islam. Depending on their location, some may even practice elements of both faiths, due to a lack of churches or fear of Turkish extremists.

== Politics ==
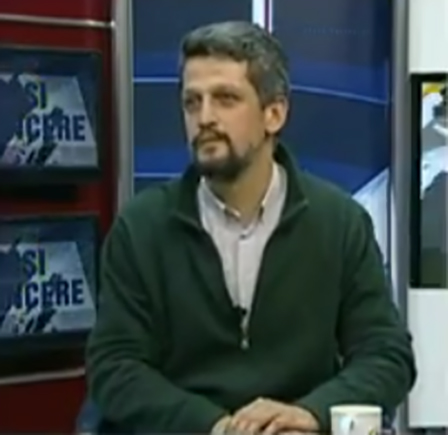
Garo Paylan (Armenian: Կարօ Փայլան, born 1972) is a Turkish politician of Armenian descent. He is a Member of the Grand National Assembly of Turkey for the Peoples' Democratic Party (HDP) representing Istanbul. He became one of the first Armenian members of Turkey's parliament in decades.

The wealth tax known as Varlık Vergisi, a Turkish tax levied on the non-Muslim citizens of Turkey by a law enacted on November 11, 1942, with the stated aim of raising funds for the country's defense in case of an eventual entry into World War II had devastating effect on the ethnic minorities of Turkey, especially the Armenian community. The law came under harsh criticism, as property holders had to sell a lot of their assets at greatly deflated prices or such assets were confiscated by the authorities. The unpopular law was abolished on March 15, 1944.

The traditional Armenian political parties were known to be very active in Ottoman political life, including the Armenian Revolutionary Federation (ARF – Dashnagtsutiun), the Social Democrat Hunchakian Party (Hunchak) and the Armenakan Party, the predecessor of the Armenian Democratic Liberal Party (Ramgavar Party). But the activities of all these Armenian parties were curtailed after the Armenian genocide. Ethnic-based political parties as well as religious-based political parties are prohibited in Turkey by law.

The Armenians of Turkey were also highly critical of the activist role that the Armenian Secret Army for the Liberation of Armenia (ASALA), the Justice Commandos Against Armenian Genocide (JCAG), Armenian Revolutionary Army (ARA) and other Armenian guerrilla organizations played in targeting Turkish diplomats and interests worldwide at the height of their anti-Turkish campaign in the 1970s and 1980s. The fears of the Turkish Armenians were justified with the fact that at many times, Turkish-Armenian institutions and even religious centers were targeted by threats and actual bombings in retaliation of the acts of ASALA, JCAG, ARA and others.

The Turkish-Armenian Artin Penik committed suicide in 1982 by self-immolation in protest of the terrorist attack on 7 August 1982 in Ankara's Esenboğa International Airport by the Armenian Secret Army for the Liberation of Armenia (ASALA). Penik died five days after he set himself on fire in Taksim plaza, the main square of Istanbul, Turkey, and his stance was reflected by the Turkish mass media as a protest of most Turkish-Armenians against such attacks. Nine people were killed and more than 70 wounded in the attack on the Turkish airport.

Another turbulent point for the Armenian community of Turkey was the highly publicized public trial of the Armenian gunman and one of the perpetrators of the attack, the 25-year-old Levon Ekmekjian, who was found guilty and eventually hanged at Ankara's civilian prison on January 30, 1983. He had been sentenced to death in September 1982 after having confessed that he had carried out the airport attack with another gunman on behalf of ASALA, and despite the fact that he publicly condemned violent acts during his own trial and appealed to the Armenian militants to stop the violence.

The Turkish Armenian Reconciliation Commission (TARC) was set up in July 2001 a joint project of a number of Turkish and Armenian intellectuals and political experts to discuss various aspects of the Turkish-Armenian relations and approving a set of recommendations to the governments of Turkey and Armenia on how to improve the strained relations between the two countries.

Thousands of Turks joined Turkish intellectuals in publicly apologizing for the World War I era mass killings and deportations of Armenians in the Ottoman Empire. The unprecedented apology was initiated by a group of 200 Turkish academics, journalists, writers and artists disagreeing with the official Turkish version of what many historians consider the first genocide of the 20th century. Their petition, entitled "I apologize", was posted on a special website.

On the occasion of a World Cup qualifying match between the two national football teams of Turkey and Armenia in the Armenian capital Yerevan, and following the Armenian President Serzh Sargsyan's invitation to attend the match, on 6 September 2008, the Turkish President Abdullah Gül paid a breakthrough landmark visit to Armenia that he said "promises hope for the future" for the two countries.

=== Local politics ===
The Turkish-Armenian Sarkis "Aghparik" Cherkezian and Aram Pehlivanyan (Nickname: Ahmet Saydan) played a pivotal role in the founding of the Communist Party of Turkey. In 2015, three Turkish-Armenians, Garo Paylan (Peoples' Democratic Party), Markar Esayan (Justice and Development Party), and Selina Özuzun Doğan (Republican People's Party)—were elected, and became the first Armenians to be elected as Member of Parliament to the Grand National Assembly of Turkey since 1961.

Hrant Dink, the Turkish-Armenian journalist, writer and political activist, and the chief editor and publisher of Agos was well known for conveying the ideas and aspirations of Turkish-Armenians and many Armenians worldwide. His newspaper Agos had played an important role in presenting Armenian historical grievances through publishing of articles and opinions in the Turkish language addressed to the Turkish public opinion. His assassination in front of his newspaper offices on January 19, 2007, turned into an occasion for expression of national grief throughout Turkey and the rallying of great support for the concerns of the Armenian community in Turkey by the general Turkish public.

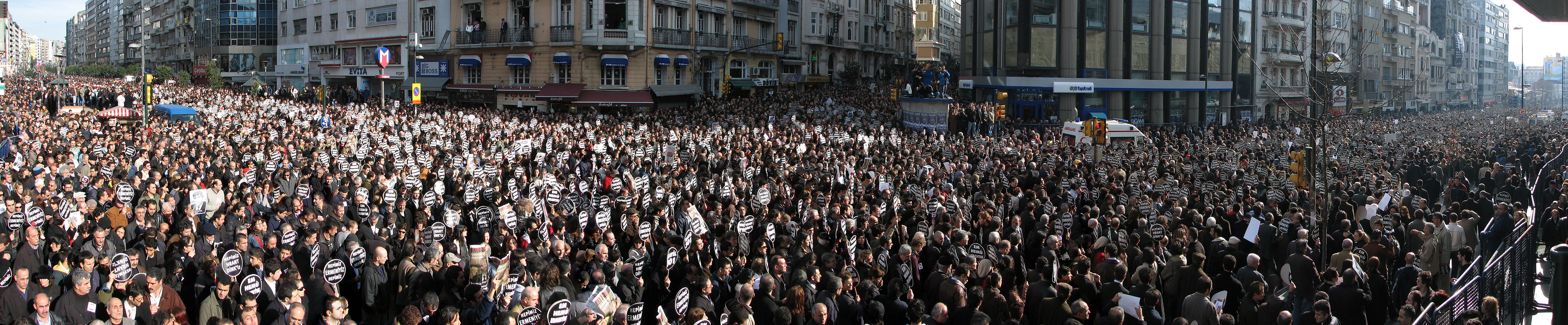
Protests in Istanbul during the funeral of murdered journalist Hrant Dink where more than 100,000 people marched. Protesters hold banners saying "We are all Hrant, we are all Armenians". (panorama from Halaskargazi Boulevard in Şişli district)

Dink was best known for advocating Turkish-Armenian reconciliation and human and minority rights in Turkey; he was often critical of both Turkey's denial of the Armenian genocide, and of the Armenian diaspora's campaign for its international recognition. Dink was prosecuted three times for denigrating Turkishness, while receiving numerous death threats from Turkish nationalists. At his funeral, one hundred thousand mourners marched in protest of the assassination, chanting "We are all Armenians" and "We are all Hrant Dink". Criticism of Article 301, which makes insulting Turkey and the Turkish government illegal, became increasingly vocal after his death, leading to parliamentary proposals for repeal of the law.

== Religion ==
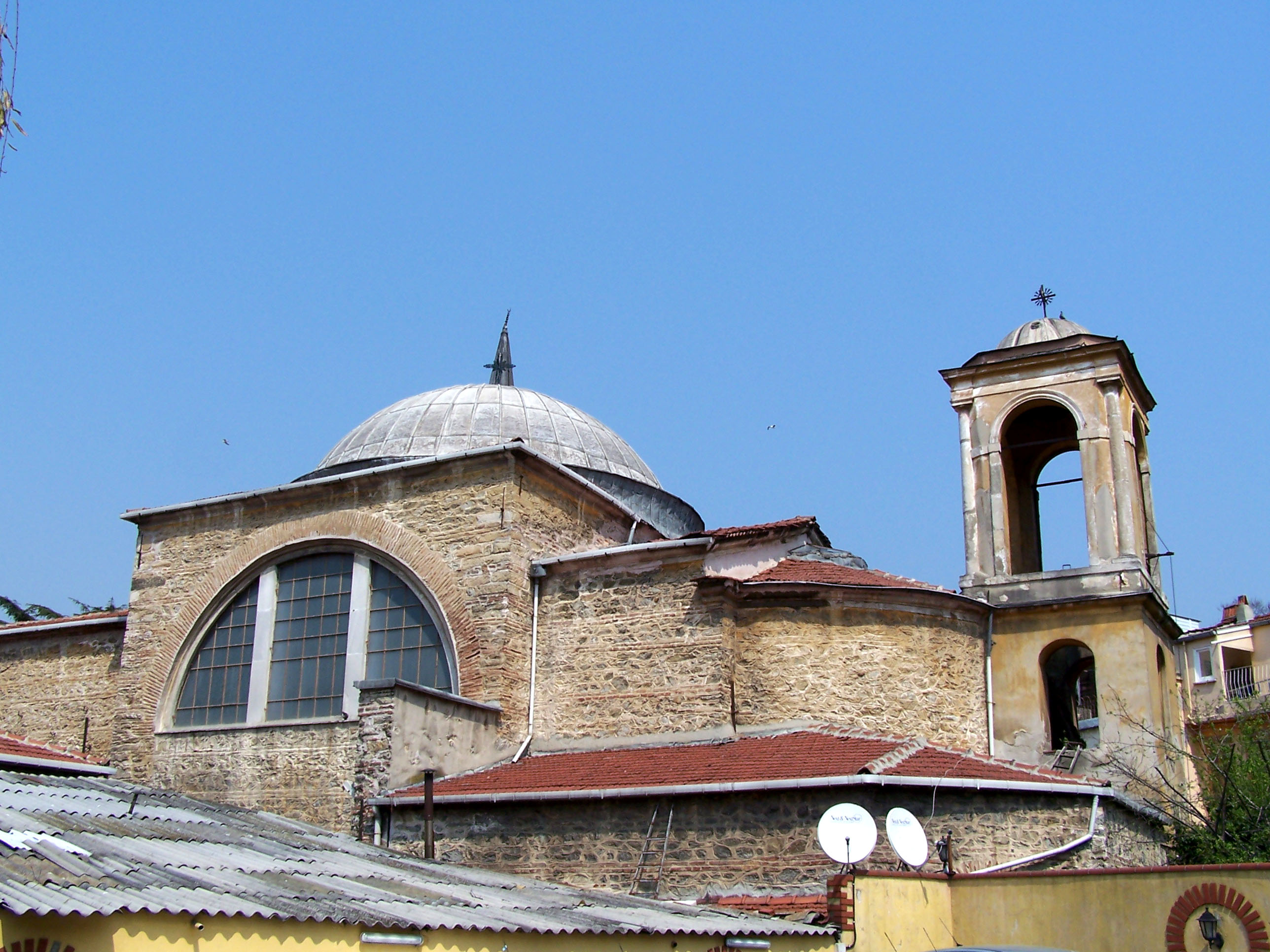
Surp Krikor Lusavoriç Kilisesi (St. Gregory The Enlightener Church) in Kuzguncuk, Üsküdar, Istanbul.

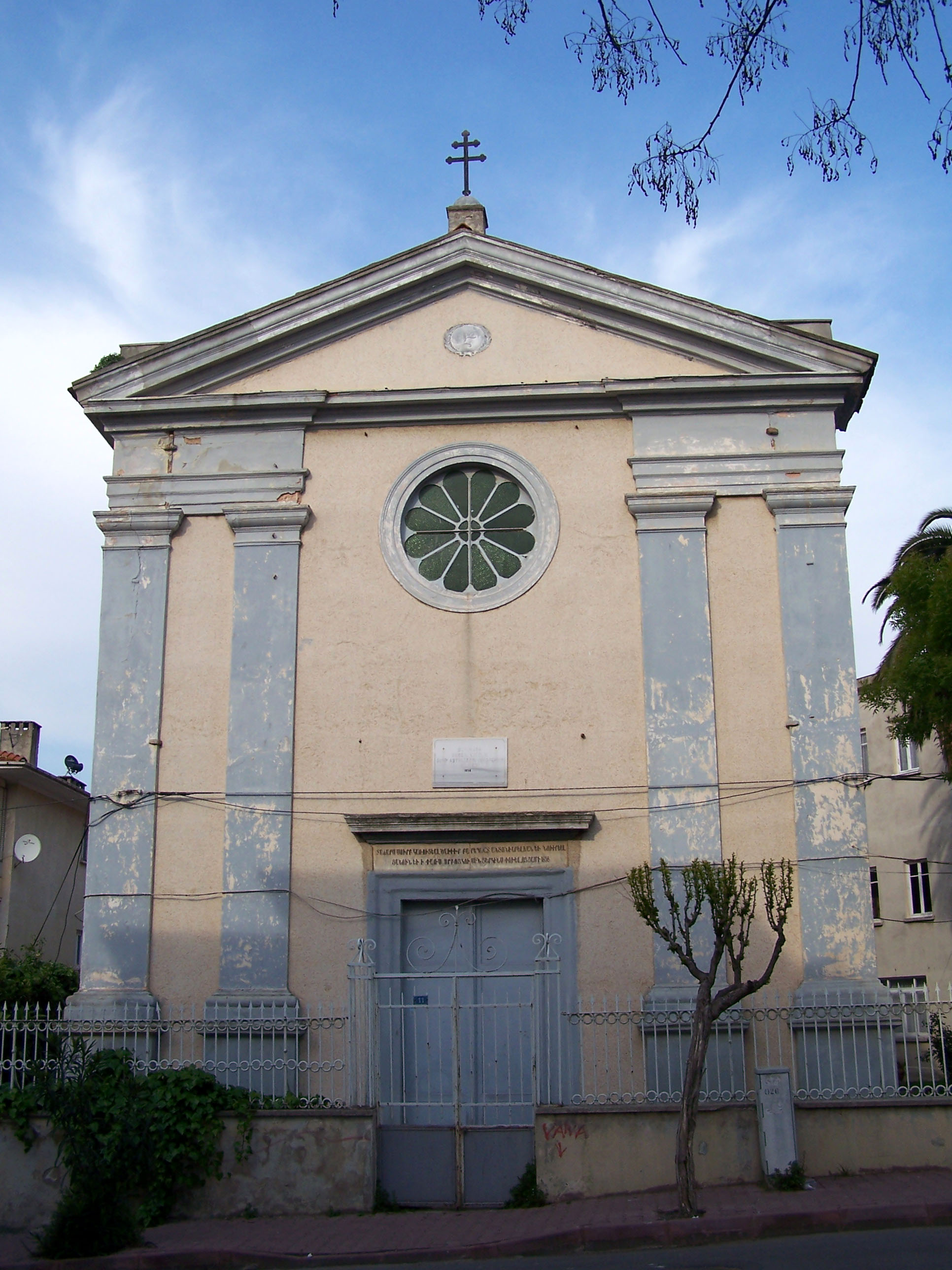
Assumption Armenian Catholic Church in Büyükada, Adalar, Istanbul.

=== Religious affiliation ===
Virtually all Armenians who are officially registered as part of the Armenian Minority are Christians, and are either of the Armenian Apostolic, Catholic, or less commonly Protestant denominations. The religion of others and those not officially part of the minority is elaborated on in the Demographics section.

=== Armenian Patriarchate of Constantinople ===
The Armenian Patriarchate of Istanbul (officially Armenian Patriarchate of Constantinople) has been the religious head of the Armenian community in Turkey since 1461. The Armenian Patriarchate of Constantinople recognizes the primacy of the Supreme Patriarch and Catholicos of All Armenians, in the spiritual and administrative headquarters of the Armenian Church, as well as the Mother See of Holy Etchmiadzin, which is headquartered in Vagharshapat, Republic of Armenia, in matters that pertain to the worldwide Armenian Church. In local matters, the Patriarchal See is autonomous.

Sahak II Mashalian is the 85th Armenian Patriarch of Constantinople under the authority of the Supreme Patriarch and Catholicos of All Armenians.

=== Armenian Catholic Archdiocese of Constantinople ===
The Armenian Catholic Archdiocese of Constantinople is based in Istanbul and in 2008 reported 3,650 followers.

=== Christmas date, etiquette and customs ===
Armenians celebrate Christmas at a date later than most of the Christians, on 6 January rather than 25 December. The reason for this is historical; according to Armenians, Christians once celebrated Christmas on 6 January, until the 4th century. 25 December was originally a pagan holiday that celebrated the birth of the sun. Many members of the church continued to celebrate both holidays, and the Roman church changed the date of Christmas to be 25 December and declared January 6 to be the date when the three wise men visited the baby Jesus. As the Armenian Apostolic Church had already separated from the Roman church at that time, the date of Christmas remained unchanged for Armenians.

The Armenians in Turkey refer to Christmas as Surp Dzınunt (Holy Birth) and have fifty days of preparation called Hisnag before Christmas. The first, fourth and seventh weeks of Hisnag are periods of vegetarian fast for church members and every Saturday at sunset a new purple candle is lit with prayers and hymns. On the second day of Christmas, 7 January, families visit graves of relatives and say prayers.

=== Armenian churches in Turkey ===
Turkey has hundreds of Armenian churches. However, the majority of them are either in ruins or are being used for other purposes. Armenian churches still in active use belong to various denominations, mainly Armenian Apostolic, but also Armenian Catholic and Armenian Evangelical Protestant.

== Education ==
Turkey's Armenian community faces educational problems due to the steadily decreasing number of students every school year, the steadily decreasing number of Armenian schools, and a lack of funding. The number of Armenian schools has fallen from 47 in the 1920s to 17 in 2010, with 3,000 Armenian students in 2010, down from 6,000 Armenian students in 1981. Schools are kindergarten through 12th grade (K–12), kindergarten through 8th grade (K-8) or 9th grade through 12th (9–12). Ermeni İlköğretim Okulu means "Armenian primary+secondary school". Ermeni Lisesi means "Armenian high school". The Armenian schools apply the full Turkish curriculum in addition to Armenian subjects, mainly Armenian language, literature and religion.

In September 2011, the Turkish government recognized the right of immigrant families from Armenia to send their children to schools of the Turkey's Armenian community. This move came as a result of lobbying of Deputy Patriarch Aram Ateşyan, according to whom there were some 1,000 children of Armenian immigrants in Turkey at that time (2011). However, as they are not Turkish citizens, at the end of the school term, they do not receive diplomas.

Some Turkish Armenian schools include,

K-8

- Aramyan-Uncuyan Ermeni İlköğretim Okulu
- Bezciyan Ermeni İlköğretim Okulu
- Bomonti Ermeni İlköğretim Okulu
- Dadyan Ermeni İlköğretim Okulu
- Kalfayan Cemaran İlköğretim Okulu
- Karagözyan İlköğretim Okulu
- Kocamustafapaşa Anarat Higutyun Ermeni İlköğretim Okulu
- Levon Vartuhyan Ermeni İlköğretim Okulu
- Feriköy Ermeni İlköğretim Okulu
- Nersesyan-Yermonyan Ermeni İlköğretim Okulu
- Pangaltı Anarat Higutyun Ermeni İlköğretim Okulu
- Tarkmanças Ermeni İlköğretim Okulu
- Yeşilköy Ermeni İlköğretim Okulu

9–12

- Getronagan Ermeni Lisesi
- Surp Haç Ermeni Lisesi

K–12

- Esayan Ermeni İlköğretim Okulu ve Lisesi
- Pangaltı Ermeni Lisesi
- Sahakyan-Nunyan Ermeni Lisesi

== Health ==
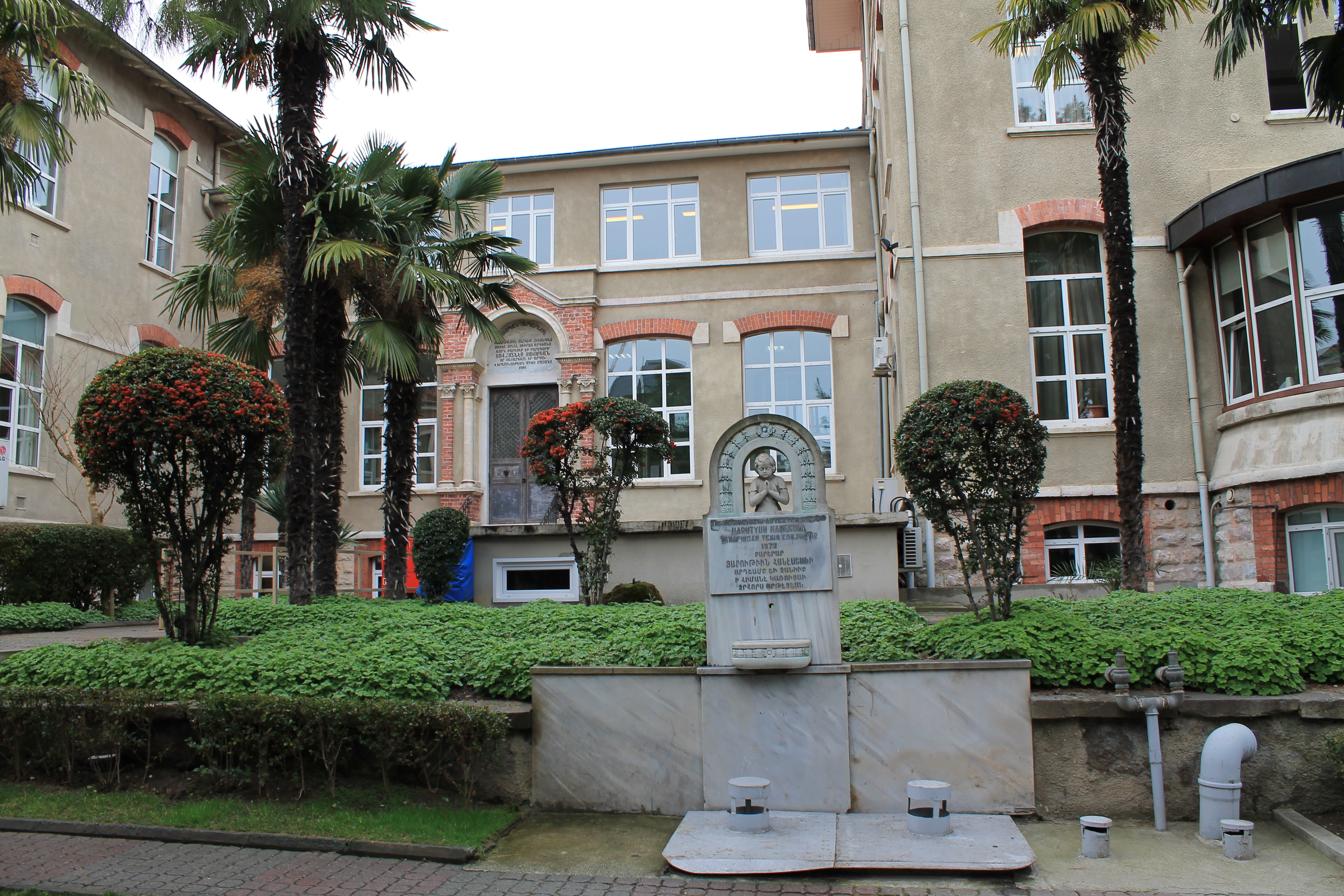
Surp Prgiç Armenian Hospital, Zeytinburnu

Among other institutions, Turkish Armenians also have their own long-running hospitals:

- Surp Prgiç Armenian Hospital (Սուրբ Փրկիչ in Armenian – pronounced Sourp Pergitch or St Saviour). It also has its media information bulletin called "Surp Prgiç"
- Surp Agop Armenian Hospital (Սուրբ Յակոբ in Armenian pronounced Sourp Hagop)

== Language ==
=== Western Armenian ===
Western Armenian (Armenian: Արեւմտահայերէն pronounced Arevmedahayeren), Armenian: Արեւմտեան աշխարհաբար pronounced Arevmedyan Ashkharhapar, (and earlier known as Armenian: Թրքահայերէն, namely "Trkahayeren" ("Turkish-Armenian") are one of the two modern dialects of the modern Armenian, an Indo-European language.

The Western Armenian dialect was developed in the early part of the 19th century, based on the Armenian dialect of the Armenians in Istanbul, to replace many of the Armenian dialects spoken throughout Turkey. It was widely adopted in literary Armenian writing and in Armenian media published in the Ottoman Empire, as well as large parts of the Armenian diaspora and in modern Turkey. Partly because of this, Istanbul veritably became the cultural and literary center of the Western Armenians in the 19th and early 20th century.

Western Armenian is the language spoken by most of the Armenian diaspora, because the great majority of the Armenian diaspora in all these areas was formed in the 19th and early 20th century by Armenian populations from the Ottoman Empire. The only main diaspora community that uses Eastern Armenian is the Iranian Armenian community, the Russian Armenian community, and those who recently immigrated from Armenia. Western Armenian is the primary dialect of Armenian found in North and South America, Europe (except those in Russia) and most of the Middle East (except in Iran and Armenia).

Nevertheless, the Western Armenian language is still spoken by a small minority of the present-day Armenian community in Turkey. As of 2010, only 18 percent of the Armenian community speaks Western Armenian, while 82 percent of the Armenian community speaks Turkish. This percentage is even lower among younger people of whom only 8 percent speaks Western Armenian and 92 percent speaks Turkish. Turkish is replacing Western Armenian as a mother language, and UNESCO has added Western Armenian in its annual Atlas of the World's Languages in Danger where the Western Armenian language in Turkey is defined as a definitely endangered language.

The Western Armenian language is markedly different in grammar, pronunciation and spelling from the Eastern Armenian language spoken in Armenia, Iran and Russia, although they are both mutually intelligible. Western Armenian still keeps the classical Armenian orthography known as Mashdotsian spelling, whereas Eastern Armenian adopted reformed spelling in the 1920s (Eastern Armenian in Iran did not adopt this reform then).

=== Armeno-Turkish (Turkish in Armenian alphabet) ===
From the early 18th century until around 1950, and for almost 250 years, more than 2000 books were printed in the Turkish language using letters of the Armenian alphabet. This is popularly known as Armeno-Turkish.

Armeno-Turkish was not used just by Armenians, but also many non-Armenian elite (including the Ottoman Turkish intellectuals) could actually read the Armenian-alphabet Turkish language texts.

The Armenian alphabet was also used alongside the Arabic alphabet on official documents of the Ottoman Empire, written in Ottoman Turkish. For example, the Aleppo edition of the official gazette of the Ottoman Empire, called "Frat" (Turkish and Arabic for the Euphrates) contained a Turkish section of laws printed in Armenian alphabet.

Also very notably, the first novel to be written in the Ottoman Empire was 1851's Akabi Hikayesi, written by Armenian statesman, journalist and novelist Vartan Pasha (Hovsep Vartanian) in Ottoman Turkish, was published with Armenian script. Akabi Hikayesi depicted an impossible love story between two young people coming from two different communities amidst hostility and adversity.

When the Armenian Duzian family managed the Ottoman mint during the reign of Abdülmecid I, they kept their records in Ottoman Turkish written in Armenian script.

Great collection of Armeno-Turkish could be found in Christian Armenian worship until the late 1950s. The Bible used by many Armenians in the Ottoman Empire was not only the Bible versions printed in Armenian, but also at times the translated Turkish language Bibles using the Armenian alphabet. Usage continued in Armenian church gatherings specially for those who were Turkophones rather than Armenophones. Many of the Christian spiritual songs used in certain Armenian churches were also in Armeno-Turkish.

=== Armenians and the Turkish language ===
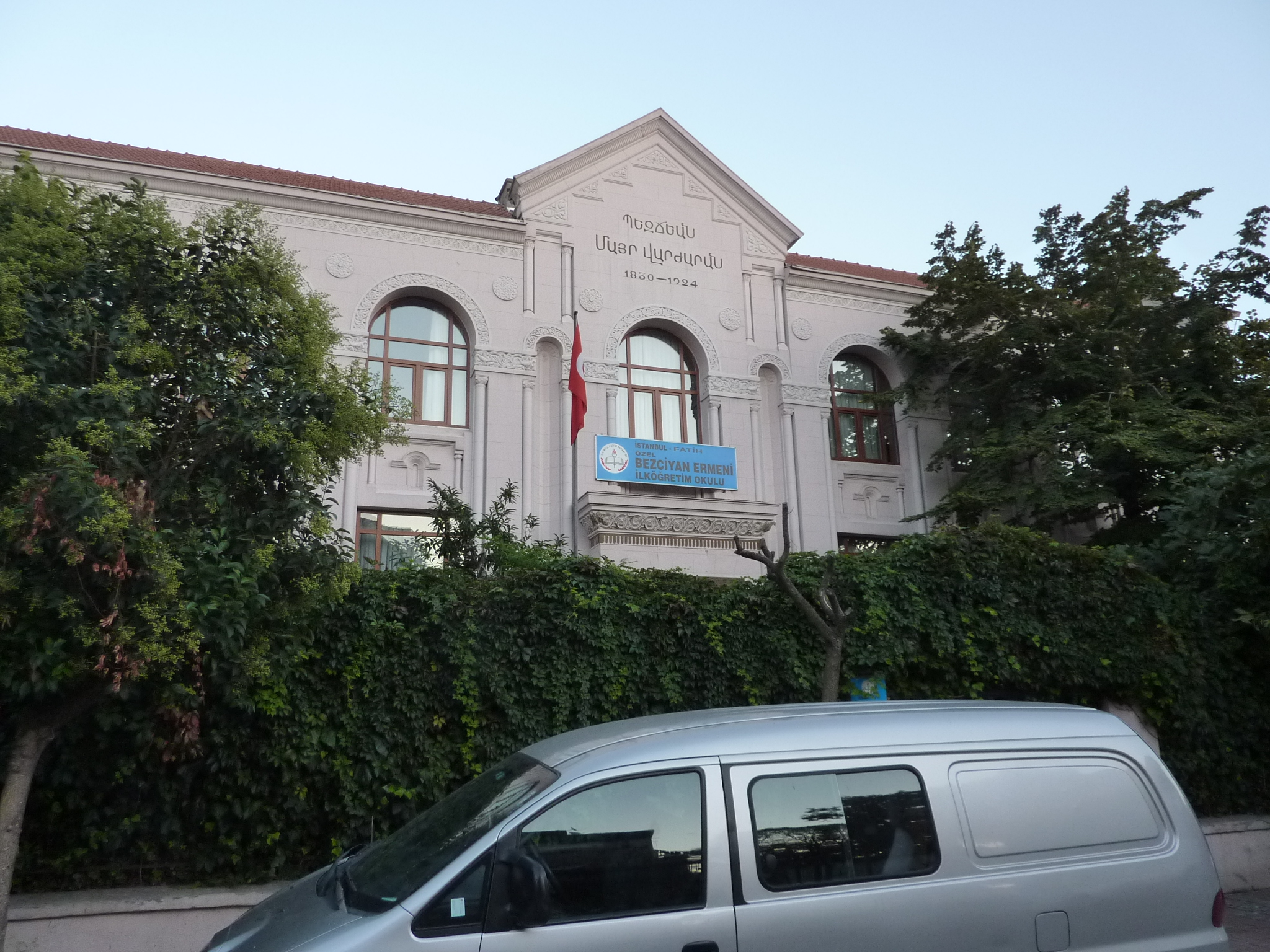
The Armenian school in Kumkapi, Istanbul (next to the Surp Asdvadzadzin Patriarchal Church)

Armenians played a key role in the promotion of the Turkish language including the reforms of the Turkish language initiated by Mustafa Kemal Atatürk.

Bedros Keresteciyan, the Ottoman linguist completed the first etymological dictionary of the Turkish language. Armenians contributed considerably to the development of printing in Turkey: Apkar Tebir started the first printing house in Istanbul in 1567; Hovannes Muhendisian (1810–1891), known as the "Turkish Gutenberg", established a printing press in Istanbul that operated from 1839 until World War I; Boghos Arabian (1742-1835) designed the Turkish type and was appointed by Sultan Mahmut II in 1816 as the superintendent of the imperial printing press, which notably published the first Turkish daily newspaper, Takvim-i Vekayi and its translation to Armenian and other languages.

The linguist Agop Martayan Dilâçar specialized in Turkic languages and was appointed head specialist of the Turkish Language Association (TLA) by Atatürk. Following the issue of the Law on Family Names in 1934, Mustafa Kemal Pasha suggested him the surname Dilaçar, meaning "language opener", which he gladly accepted. In addition to Armenian and Turkish, Martayan knew 10 other languages including English, Greek, Spanish, Latin, German, Russian and Bulgarian. He was invited on September 22, 1932, as a linguistics specialist to the First Turkish Language Congress supervised by Mustafa Kemal Atatürk, together with two other Armenian linguists, İstepan Gurdikyan and Kevork Simkeşyan. He taught history and language at Ankara University between 1936 and 1951 and was the head advisor of the Türk Ansiklopedisi (Turkish Encyclopedia), between 1942 and 1960. He held his position and continued his research in linguistics at the Turkish Language Association until his death in 1979.

== Culture ==
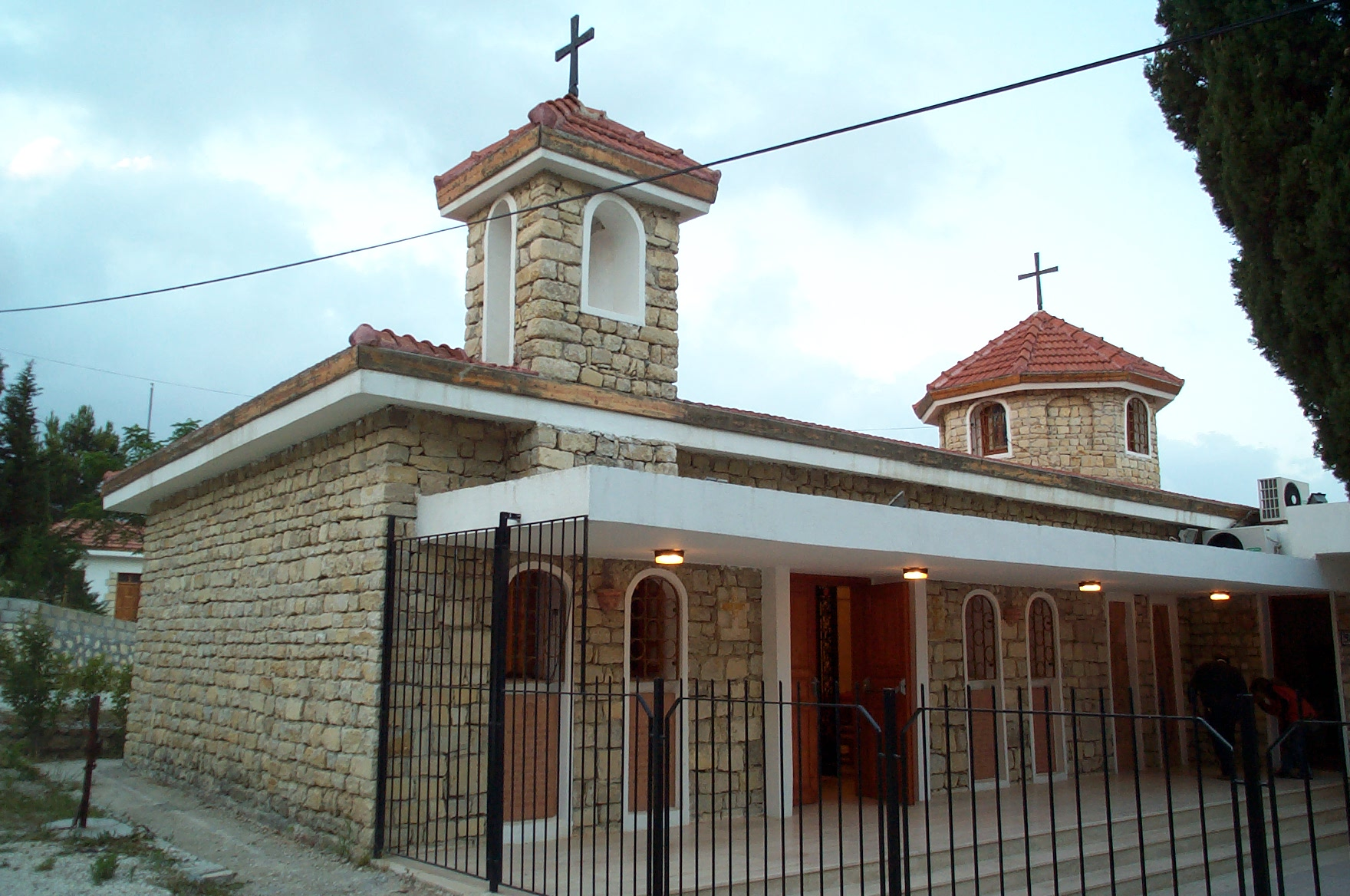
Vakıflı the only remaining Armenian village in Cilicia.

=== Music ===
The pan-Turkish Kardeş Türküler cultural and musical formation, in addition to performing a rich selection of Turkish, Kurdish, Georgian, Arabic and Roma musical numbers, also includes a number of interpretation of Armenian traditional music in its repertoire. It gave sold-out concerts in Armenia as part of the Turkish-Armenian Cultural Program, which was made possible with support from USAID.

The "Sayat-Nova" choir was founded in 1971 under the sponsorship of the St. Children's Church of Istanbul performs traditional Armenian songs and studies and interprets Armenian folk music.

Toto Karaca was a prominent stage actress. Udi Hrant Kenkulian was also a well-known oud player of classical Turkish music.

In contemporary music, Arto Tunçboyacıyan and his brother the late Onno Tunç are two veritable jazz musicians, composers and arrangers. The Turkish rock artist Yaşar Kurt is another musician of ethnic Armenian descent. Another famous Armenian rock musician is Hayko Cepkin. Hayko Tataryan is also well known for singing in Turkish, Armenian and Greek, so is his son Alex Tataryan. The Turkish-Armenian singer Sibil Pektorosoğlu (better known by her mononym Sibil) is a popular musician, winning pan-Armenian music prizes for her recordings.

=== Cinema and acting ===
Some notable Turkish Armenian people in the film industry include,

- Vahi Öz appeared in many movies from the 1940s until the late 1960s
- Sami Hazinses (real name Samuel Agop Uluçyan) appeared in tens of Turkish movies from the 1950s until the 1990s
- Nubar Terziyan appeared in more than 400 movies
- Movie actor and director Kenan Pars (real name Kirkor Cezveciyan)
- Theatre and film actress Irma Felekyan (aka Toto Karaca), who also was the mother of the rock musician Cem Karaca.

=== Photography ===
In photography Ara Güler is a famous photojournalist of Armenian descent, nicknamed "the Eye of Istanbul" or "the Photographer of Istanbul".

=== Literature ===
Turkish Armenian novelists, poets, essayists and literary critics continue to play a very important role particularly in the literary scene of the Armenian diaspora, with works of quality in Western Armenian.

Robert Haddedjian chief editor of Marmara newspaper published in Istanbul was a pivotal figure in the literary criticism scene. Zareh Yaldizciyan (1923–2007), better known by his pen name Zahrad was a renowned Western Armenian poet.

A number of Turkish writers – such as Sait Faik, Kemal Tahir and Ahmed Hamdi Tanpinar – also represented Armenians in their work and, in the case of Tanpinar, actually had Armenian friends and taught in Armenian schools.

== Media ==
Istanbul was home to a number of long-running and influential Armenian publications. Very notable now-defunct daily newspapers included Arevelk (1884–1915), Puzantyon (1896–1908), Sourhantag (1899–1908), Manzoume Efkyar (1912–1917), Vertchin Lour (1914–1924). Outside Istanbul, the notable daily publications included Arshalouys (1909–1914), Tashink (1909–1914) and Van (1908–1909).

Presently, Istanbul has two Armenian language dailies. These two newspapers, Jamanak (established in 1908) and Marmara also have a long tradition of keeping alive the Turkish Armenian literature, which is an integral part of the Western Armenian language and Armenian literature.

- Jamanak (Ժամանակ in Armenian meaning time) is a long-running Armenian language daily newspaper published in Istanbul, Turkey. The daily was established in 1908 by Misak Kochounian and has been somewhat a family establishment, given that it has been owned by the Kochounian family since its inception. After Misak Kochounian, it was passed down to Sarkis Kochounian, and since 1992 is edited by Ara Kochounian.
- Marmara, daily in Armenian (Armenian: Մարմարա) (sometimes "Nor Marmara" – New Marmara) is an Armenian-language daily newspaper published since 1940 in Istanbul, Turkey. It was established by Armenian journalist Souren Shamlian. Robert Haddeler took over the paper in 1967. Marmara is published six times a week (except on Sundays). The Friday edition contains a section in Turkish as well. Circulation is reported at 2000 per issue.
- Agos, (Armenian: Ակօս, "Furrow") is a bilingual Armenian weekly newspaper published in Istanbul in Turkish and Armenian. It was established on 5 April 1996. Today, it has a circulation of around 5,000. Besides Armenian and Turkish pages, the newspaper has an on-line English edition as well. Hrant Dink was its chief editor from the newspaper's start until his assassination outside of the newspaper's offices in Istanbul in January 2007. Hrant Dink's son Arat Dink served as the executive editor of the weekly after his assassination.
- Lraper, (Լրաբեր in Armenian) is a trilingual periodical publication in Armenian, Turkish and English languages and is the official organ of the Armenian Patriarchate of Constantinople

Other Armenian media titles include: Sourp Pergiç (St. Saviour) the magazine of the Armenian Sourp Pergiç (Pergitch) Hospital, also Kulis, Shoghagat, Norsan and the humorous Jbid (smile in Armenian)

In September 2011, the Turkish government granted some financing to Jamanak, Marmara and Agos as part of a wider campaign in support of existing minority newspapers in Turkey. The Turkish Press Advertisement Agency also declared intention to publish official government advertisements in minority newspapers including Armenian ones.

== Turkish Armenians in the diaspora ==
Despite leaving their homes in Turkey, the Turkish Armenians traditionally establish their own unions within the Armenian diaspora. Usually named "Bolsahay Miutyun"s (Istanbul-Armenian Associations), they can be found in their new adopted cities of important Turkish-Armenian populations. Among them are the "Organization of Istanbul Armenians of Los Angeles", the "Istanbul Armenian Association in Montreal", etc.

The Turkish Ambassador to Germany, Hüseyin Avni Karslıoğlu, inaugurated in December 2012 at the Bergen-Belsen Concentration Camp a memorial stone with bronze letters (third of its kind after the Polish and Dutch similars) to the memory of eight Turkish citizens killed during the Holocaust, one of whom is a Turkish Armenian with the name Garabed Taşçıyan.

== See also ==
- Armenians in the Ottoman Empire
- Armenians in Istanbul
- Minorities in Turkey
- Kurds in Turkey

=== General ===
- Armenian Patriarch of Constantinople
- Anti-Armenian sentiment in Turkey
- List of Armenian Patriarchs of Constantinople
- List of Turkish-Armenians
- Armenians in the Ottoman Empire
- Ottoman Armenian casualties
- Armenia–Turkey relations
- Confiscated Armenian Properties in Turkey
- Armenian cultural heritage in Turkey
- Varlık Vergisi

=== Demography ===
- Diyarbakır
- Beyoğlu
- Istanbul
- Kumkapı
- Crypto-Armenians
- Hemshin peoples
- Vakıflı, Samandağ, the only remaining ethnic Armenian village in Turkey.

=== Personalities ===
- Agop Dilâçar
- Vartan Pasha
- Hrant Dink
- Patriarch Shenork I Kaloustian
- Patriarch Karekin II Kazanjian
- Patriarch Mesrob II Mutafyan

=== Media ===
- Agos
- Marmara (newspaper)
- Jamanak

== Sources ==
- Başyurt, Erhan (2005-12-26). "Anneannem bir Ermeni'ymiş!". Aksiyon (in Turkish). 577. Feza Gazetecilik A.Ş. Archived from the original on February 27, 2009.

This article contains some text originally adapted from the public domain Library of Congress Country Study for Turkey.
