= Arman Manukyan =

Turkish lecturer, writer, and economist (1931–2012)

- Born: 21 March 1931; Istanbul, Turkey
- Died: 28 December 2012 (aged 81); Istanbul, Turkey
- Education: Robert College (B.A. 1951)
- Occupations: Writer, lecturer, and economist.

Arman Manukyan (Armenian: Արման Մանուկյան, 21 March 1931 – 28 December 2012) was a Turkish lecturer, writer, and economist of Armenian descent.

== Biography ==
Arman Manukyan was born in the Tahta Minare neighborhood of Istanbul. His father Artin fought in the Çanakkale War and was decorated with the İstiklal (Independence) Medal of the emerging Turkish Republic. Artin was a shoe store owner and 30 years old when he married Eliz in 1930 and the couple had Arman, their first son in 1931.

Manukyan started his early education in 1938 at the Mhitaryan Armenian school in the Şişli district of Istanbul. He graduated from his elementary studies and in 1945 he attended the prestigious Robert College. At Robert College he became good friends with future famed people such as Talât Sait Halman, Rahmi Koç, Oktay Yenal, and others. He graduated from Robert College with an Economy and Commerce Degree in 1951.

Due to his father's need of new technologies to upgrade his business, Manukyan traveled abroad many times, which includes him visiting Japan six times. After his conscription to the Turkish Army in 1953, he met his future wife Alis during his summer vacationing in Kınalıada. Soon thereafter he began his career as a lecturer on 13 September 1956, a day which he has never forgotten. However, he took the opportunity to continue his studies one last time at Miami University. His wife also became a student at Miami University in the music department.

Arman Manukyan wrote his first book, The History and Evolution of Accounting in 1960 with the help of the publishing facilities in Miami University. Arman and Alis Manukyan had their first son, Roy, right after the publication of the book. The couple decided to move back to Turkey and Arman Manukyan continued his teaching career at Robert College.

In 1971, he began teaching at Boğaziçi University and retired in 1982. Among his students have been well known figures in Turkish society such as Güler Sabancı, Tansu Çiller, Ömer Dinçkök, Jak Kamhi, and others. Though retired, he still continued to give lessons in accounting once a week. He has been a participant of many educational seminars and conferences.
