= Jirayr Ohanyan Çakır =

Turkish-Armenian chess player (1923–2003)

Jirayr Ohanyan Çakır (also known as Zhirayr Ohanian; February 5, 1923 – 2003) was a chess player, coach, and former president of the Turkish Chess Federation.

== Life ==
Of Armenian descent, Jirayr Ohanyan Çakır was born in Istanbul, Turkey, on February 5, 1921. His father Avedis, who was from Merzifon, was the owner of the famous Markiz Bakery and was one of the biggest donors to the Turkish Armed Forces. His mother Anna-Mari was from Bursa and was a teacher at the Private Armenian School of Pangaltı and the Galatasaray High School.

Ohanyan Çakır was introduced to chess when he was a student at Galatasaray High School. In 1943, with his classmate Turan Başak, he became a member of the school's chess club. After attaining lessons from famed Chess player Selim Palavan, Ohanyan Çakır conducted chess courses at the Şişli Sports Club and gathered at least 400 students. Şişli Sports Club experienced its "golden age" during this period in terms of chess.

== Later career ==
Ohanyan Çakır was elected president of the Sports Club of Şişli in 1964. He traveled to the Chess Olympiad in Tel Aviv in 1964 and captained the Turkish National Team. Between 1964 and 1977, he was a member of the board of directors of the Turkish Chess Federation.

Between 1976 and 1977, he became the president of the Istanbul Chess Federation.

He was elected president of the Taksim Sports Association in 1977.

Between 1978 and 1982, he was the president of the Turkish Chess Federation.

In 1986 he assumed the position of general secretary of the Turkish Chess Federation and was elected honorary advisory board member of the federation in 1988.

From 1989 and onwards, he became the chess coach of numerous Armenian schools throughout Istanbul.

== Family life ==
He is the father of a boy and two girls and a grandfather of four. His daughter Linda became the women's chess champion of Turkey in 1972.

== Legacy ==
In 2011 a chess tournament was organized in his honor in Istanbul.

== See also ==
- Armenians in Turkey
