= Pangaltı Mkhitaryan School =

Elementary and high school in Istanbul, Turkey

Coordinates: 41.0514°N 28.9884°E

Private Armenian School of Pangaltı (Turkish: Özel Pangaltı Ermeni Okulu) is a private Armenian community school in Pangaltı quarter in Şişli district, Istanbul, Turkey.

== Name ==
The complete name of the school in Turkish is Özel Pangaltı Ermeni İlkokulu Ortaokul Lisesi ve Anadolu Lisesi, meaning "Private Armenian Primary, Secondary, Highschool and Anatolian Highschool of Pangaltı". (In Turkish education system, "Anadolu Lisesi (Anatolian High School) is a denomination for highschools with a foreign language intensive education, generally English.)

== History ==
According to the school's official webpage, it was established in 1825 in Beyoğlu, in the European part of modern-day Istanbul, by the Mekhitarist monastic order. Another source states that it was first opened in Kandilli, in Üsküdar district, at the Anatolian (Asian) part of Istanbul in 1811, closed in 1816, and later reopened and continued education within the Mekhitarist monastery in Beyoğlu, from 1825 until 1866, when it was moved to its current location. Today the school works under the guidance of the Ministry of National Education of Turkey, subject to the same regulations as other public and private schools and caters to the needs of the Armenian community of Istanbul.

== Notable alumni ==
- Jirayr Ohanyan Çakır
- Armen Dorian
- Ara Güler (1928-2018), photographer
- Arman Manukyan
- Rober Haddeciyan
- Sevan Nişanyan
- Ohannes Tchekidjian
- Zahrad
