= Ohannes Tchekidjian =

Soviet conductor and composer (born 1929)

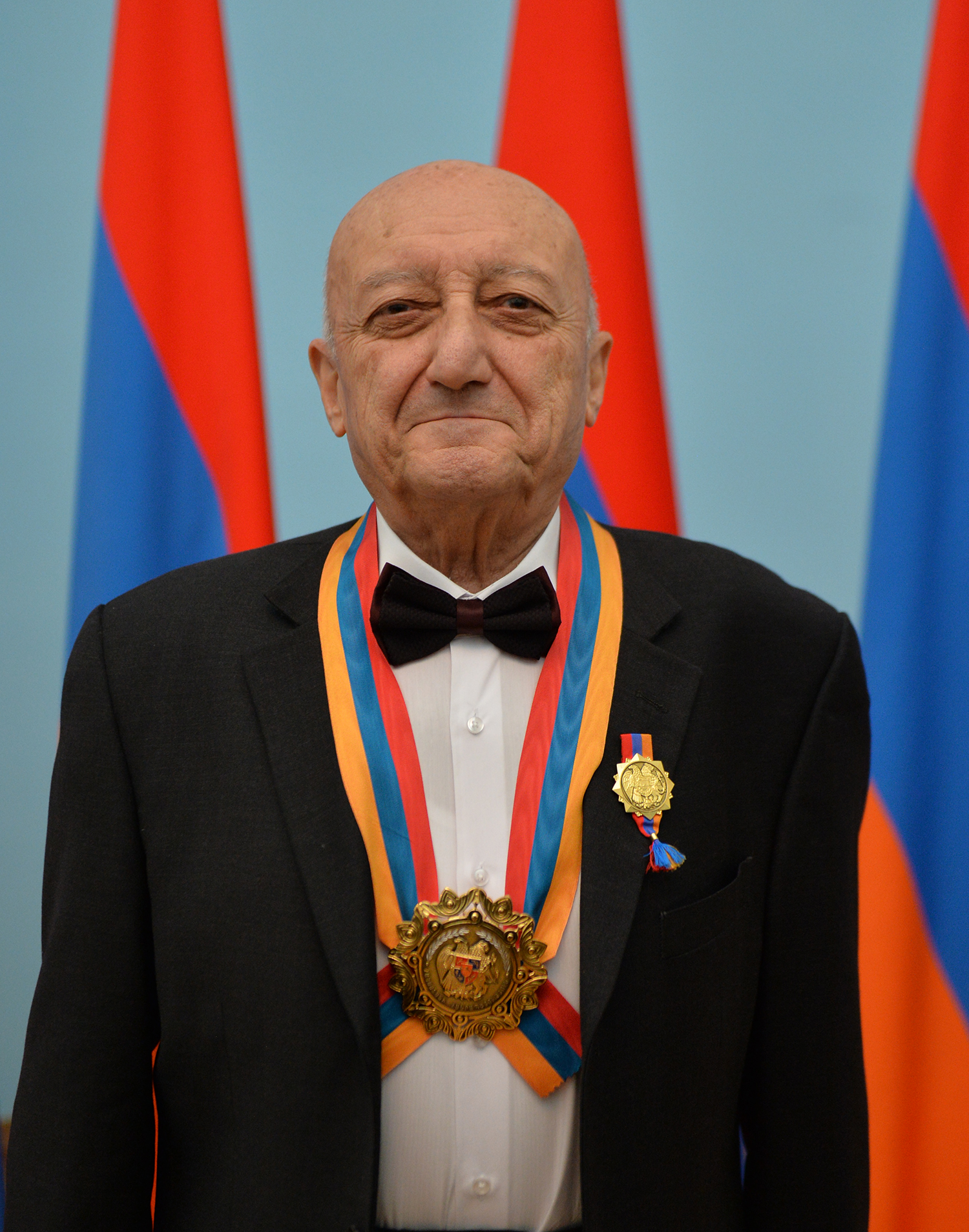
Tchekidjian in 2018

Ohannes Tchekidjian (Armenian: Հովհաննես Չեքիջյան; born January 23, 1929) is an Armenian composer and conductor and a recipient of both USSR State Prize and People's Artist of USSR.

== Biography ==
Tchekidjian was born in Istanbul, Turkey and attended Mekhitaryan School there for seven years.

From 1941 to 1947 he attended French College of Saint Michel and from 1944 to 1951 worked at both Istanbul Conservatory as faculty conductor and as a conductor of the Duryan Choir. From 1951 to 1953 he attended lectures of professor Jean Fournet at the École Normale de Musique de Paris and during the same years have attended Institute of Chemistry where he obtained a minor degree in chemical engineering.

In 1961 he took postgraduate lessons at the Istanbul Conservatory and then moved to Armenia where he worked with the State Academic Choir. Prior to it, he was artistic director and chief conductor of the State Choir of Istanbul, a music director of the Süreyya Opera House, and was a founder and conductor of his own choir. In 1969 he was awarded an Academic title from the Armenian State Choir and six years later got an Honoured title as well. Since 1975 he works at the Komitas State Conservatory in Yerevan where he became a professor by 1982, and from that year till 1987 was a director and chief conductor of the Spendiaryan Academic State Theatre of Opera & Ballet in the same place. Besides being a composer and conductor he also had some political influence in Armenia. From 1975 to 1990 he was a member of Armenian National Assembly in the Armenian Soviet Socialist Republic and then was promoted to Supreme Soviet of the Soviet Union membership where he served from 1979 to 1984. On April 27, 2010 he conducted Requiem by Wolfgang Amadeus Mozart at the Saint Gregory the Illuminator Cathedral, Yerevan which Supreme Patriarch Karekin II have attended.

=== EDUCATION ===
1934-1941	Mkhitaryan School, Istanbul
1941-1947	French College of Saint Michel
1944-1951	Faculty of Conductors at The Istanbul Conservatory
1947-1951	The branch of Vienna College, Istanbul
1951-1953	Paris Ecole Normale de Musique, lectured by professor Jean Fournet, the Principal Conductor of the Paris Opera House. Also attended the Institute of Chemistry, got diploma in Chemical Engineering
1958-1961	Postgraduate courses at the Istanbul Conservatory

=== COMMUNITY SERVICE ===
Has never been a member of a Political Party at any time

1975-1980	Member of Parliament of Supreme Council of Armenian SSR
1979-1984	Member of Parliament of Supreme Council of the USSR
1980-1990	Member of Parliament of Supreme Council of Armenian SSR

=== PROFESSIONAL BACKGROUND ===
1944-1951	Conductor of the Duryan Choir, Istanbul
1955-1961	Founder of the Tchekidjian Choir
1958-1961	Musical director of the stage of The Istanbul Opera
1960-1961	Artistic director and Chief Conductor of The State Choir, Istanbul
1961-present	Moved to Armenia and since then has been working with The State Academic Choir of Armenia as the Artistic Director & Chief Conductor. The Choir was awarded the Academic title in 1969 and the Honoured title in 1975. By the special governmental order National Status in 2012
1975-present	Working at Komitas State Conservatory, Yerevan. Professorship from High Attestation Commission of USSR since 1982.
1982-1987	General Director of Spendiaryan Academic State Theatre of Opera & Ballet, Yerevan

=== WORLD TOURS OUT OF THE USSR ===
1964	Estonia, Latvia, Lithuania
1966	Estonia, Latvia, Lithuania
1967	Estonia, Latvia, Lithuania
1969	Lithuania
1971	Lithuania
1974	Estonia, Latvia, Lithuania
1974	France, Lebanon
1976	Latvia
1979	Czechoslovakia
1980	Estonia, Latvia, Lithuania
1980	Poland
1983	Latvia, Estonia
1986	France, Great Britain, Estonia, Latvia, Lithuania
1987	United States of America, Latvia
1990	Greece
1992	Lebanon, Syria
1994	United States of America
1995	Great Britain, France, Spain, Switzerland
1997	Turkey
1998	Argentina
1999	Switzerland (Prize at the Festival International de Montreux)
2001	France, Greece
2003	Australia
2004	Turkey
2005	Lebanon, Syria
2008	United States of America
2009	United States of America
2011	Germany
2012	Argentina, Uruguay, USA
2013	Turkey
2014	Turkey
2015	France
2016	Lebanon
2017	Turkey Order “Ormanian”
