= Sibil Pektorosoğlu =

Armenian singer born in İstanbul

Sibil Սիպիլ
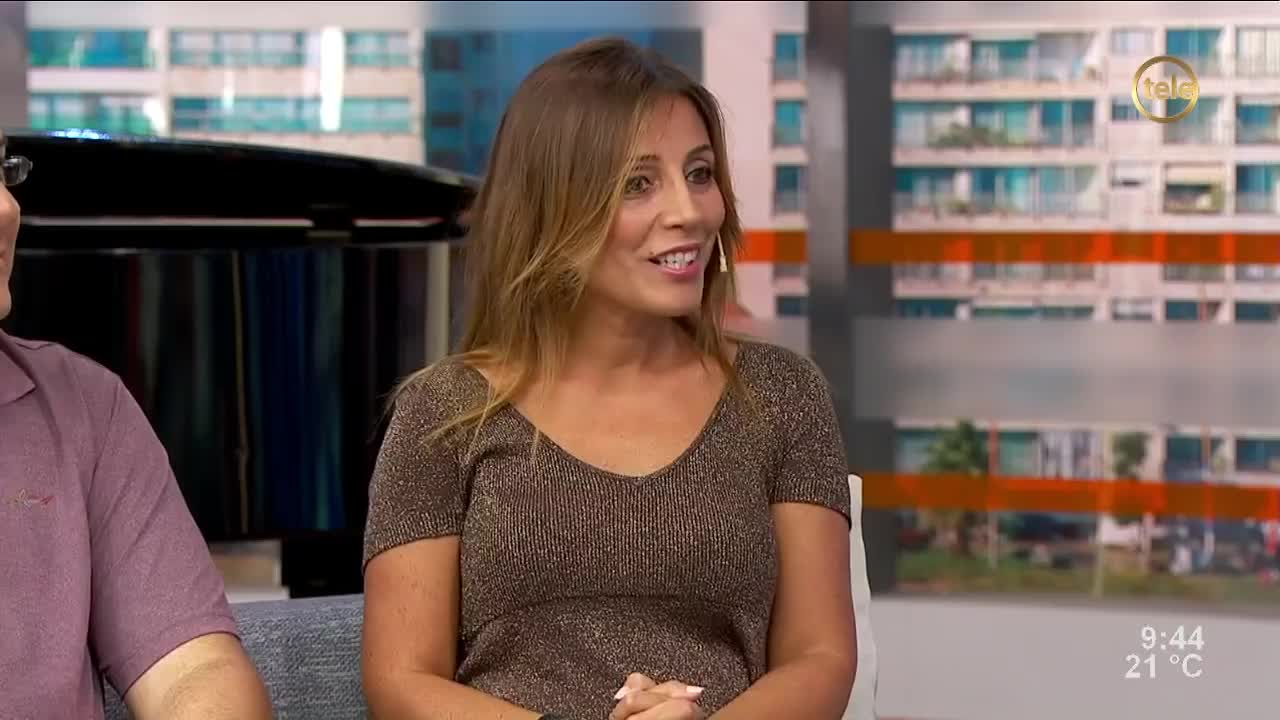
- Sibil in 2019

Background information
- Born: Kurtuluş, Şişli, Istanbul, Turkey
- Genres: Pop
- Occupation: Musician
- Years active: 2006-present
- Label: Ossi Music

SibilPektorosoğlu (Սիպիլ) known mononymously as Sibil, is an Armenian pop singer. A lyric soprano, she was a chorister and soloist in the Armenian Apostolic Church for almost twenty years, before she released two albums of songs in the Armenian language. Sibil sang in front of the historic ruins of Ani in eastern Turkey, which she described as a personal dream of hers, and appeared during the opening ceremony of the 2015 Pan-Armenian Summer Games, as well as at various festivals. She was honored with several medals and awards by the Armenian state.

== Biography ==
=== Early life ===
Sibil was born to Garo and Mari in the Kurtuluş neighborhood of the Şişli district of Istanbul, Turkey. She has an elder sister, Garin. Her paternal grandparents Vahe and Moyemzar were from Istanbul. Her maternal grandfather Toros was born in Divriği district of Sivas, while her maternal grandmother Arsenuhi was from Erbaa in Tokat. Both maternal grandparents settled in Istanbul after their marriage; her mother was the youngest daughter of the family.

Sibil completed her primary education at the private Armenian Pangaltı Mkhitaryan School in Şişli district's Pangaltı neighborhood of Istanbul. She continued her education at the private Evrim High School in Bomonti, Şişli. She then studied at the American Culture College. She lives in the same house where she was born, together with her parents.

=== Musical debut ===
Sibil's father sang in the church choir "Kohtan" in the Surp Asdvadzadzin Patriarchal Church in the Kumkapı quarter of Fatih district in Istanbul. Sibil grew up with church music as her father used to take her in her childhood to the church when he sang in the choir. She developed so a love for music and singing. For this reason, she entered the choir at the Surp Vartanants Church in Feriköy, Şişli, which is situated close to her home. She performed there as a chorist and soloist at around 60 concerts, over some twenty years. She drew attention with her lyric soprano voice. Although she expressed interest in being formally educated at a music conservatory, she had to abandon this project, entering working life at an early age. Music remained a hobby while continued she worked for many years as a consultant for a financial investment company.

=== Recording artist ===
Sibil was one of the soloists of the "Surp Vartanants" choir, known for their concerts at various festivals, and especially for appearing with established artists such as Sezen Aksu (2002), and Nükhet Duru. As a family friend, the Armenian-Turkish pop composer Cenk Taşkan (Majak Toşikyan) encouraged her to record Armenian songs in CD-form. The recording was done in Taşkan's home studio, and completed in twenty days. On 10 November 2010, her first album, eponymously named Sibil, was released by Ossi Music, Istanbul; it features twelve popular songs in the Armenian language. Taşkan was a major contributor, lending several of his new compositions and arrangements. The album features with contributions by the internationally famous ney master Mercan Dede, by qanun master Göksel Baktagir, by bouzouki player Petro, and by the Surp Vartanants Choir.

One year after the release of this first album, Sibil decided to leave the church choir. When concert offers came from abroad, she found it not ethic to sing at church choir concerts only without attending the rehearsals. She devoted herself fully to Armenian popular music. She represented Armenian music on stage with Mercan Dede at the "Paris Saint Denis Festival" held in the Basilica of Saint-Denis, Paris, France. She sang to Armenian music in the "Breath of the Earth" concert, arranged by Göksel Baktagir, and also at another concert by one of Europe's award-winning musical bands.

Sibil's second album, called Ser ("Love"), was released by Ossi Music on 11 February 2014. Musicians such as the duduk master Djivan Gasparyan, composer Ara Gevorgyan, singer André, as well as Mercan Dede were among those who contributed to the album with either compositions, instrumental play, or back-up vocals. The album features twelve songs including a piece in Aramaic–Syriac, advertised by her label as the native language of Jesus Christ.

In 2015, Sibil visited Ani in eastern Turkey, alongside the president of the Pan-Armenian Games committee, Ishan Zakarian, who had extended her his invitation. There, in front of the historic ruins, she sang the Armenian song "Desnem Ani’n U Nor Mernem" ("Let me see Ani and Die", Turkish: Ani’yi görsem sonra ölsem), which had been a personal dream of hers. On 2 August the same year, she sang the same song as part of an opening ceremony for the Pan-Armenian Summer Games in Yerevan, Armenia, to an audience comprising more than 6,000 athletes. During her one-week stay in Armenia, she was also hosted by various radio and television stations.

== Honours ==
Sibil received the first prize in the "Magical Voice" category at the "Armenia Music Awards" ceremony, held in Moscow, Russia in 2012. She was awarded with the "Medal of Gratitude" by the President of Armenia Serzh Sargsyan for her contribution to the Pan-Armenian Games; with the "Komitas Medal" by the Diaspora Minister of Armenia, Hranush Hakobyan; and with a "Golden Medal" by the Mayor of Yerevan, Taron Margaryan. She was honored with the "Special Mission to Promote and Protect Armenian Music in the Diaspora" award at the "Armenlan Music Awards" ceremony, and with the "Diaspora's Best Female Singer of the Year" award at the "World Armenian Entertainment Awards" ceremony in Los Angeles.
