= Armen Dorian =

Armenian poet, teacher, and editor (1892–1915)

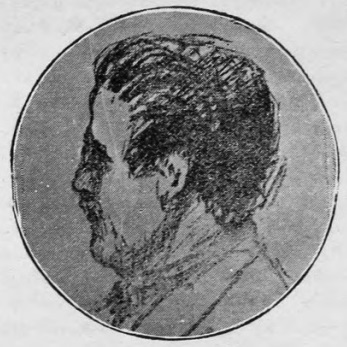
- An amateur sketch of Armen Dorian
- Born: 28 January 1892; Sinop in the Kastamonu Vilayet of the Ottoman Empire
- Died: 1915 (aged 22–23)
- Occupation: Poet

Armen Dorian (Armenian: Արմէն Տօրեան; 28 January 1892 – 1915) was a renowned Armenian poet, teacher, and editor who lived in the Ottoman Empire. He studied at the Sorbonne University in Paris, France. He wrote poetry in French and Armenian. In 1915, Dorian was arrested and killed during the Armenian genocide at the age of 23.

== Life ==
Armen Dorian was born Hrachia Surenian in Sinop in the Kastamonu Vilayet of the Ottoman Empire on 28 January 1892. Dorian moved to the capital Constantinople where he received his early education at the Pangaltı Mekhitarist Armenian School. After finishing his education, Dorian traveled to France in 1911 and continued his studies at the Sorbonne University in Paris. He joined the French literary scene and founded the French newspaper L'Arène. In 1913, he and other prominent French poets founded the pantheist literary school. It was said of Dorian that "symbolists during that time in France had never seen a youth with such a fervent vigor with a majestic writing style that incorporated such beautiful dreams..." Immediately after his graduation from the Sorbonne in 1914, Dorian returned to Constantinople where he became a teacher and taught French and Armenian literature.

== Death ==
In the middle of the night, on 24 April 1915, Armen Dorian was arrested while teaching. The arrests were part of the Armenian genocide which sought to deport Armenian notables from the capital to the interior provinces of the Ottoman Empire.

Armen Dorian was initially sent to Çankırı where he and other Armenian intellectuals were imprisoned. He was removed from prison and murdered en route to Ankara. He was 23 years old.
