= Armenians in Istanbul =

Ethnic group

Total population
- 50,000–70,000

Languages
- Turkish (majority), Western Armenian (minority)

Religion
- Armenian Apostolic Church (Armenian Patriarchate of Constantinople), Armenian Catholic Church, and Armenian Evangelical Church

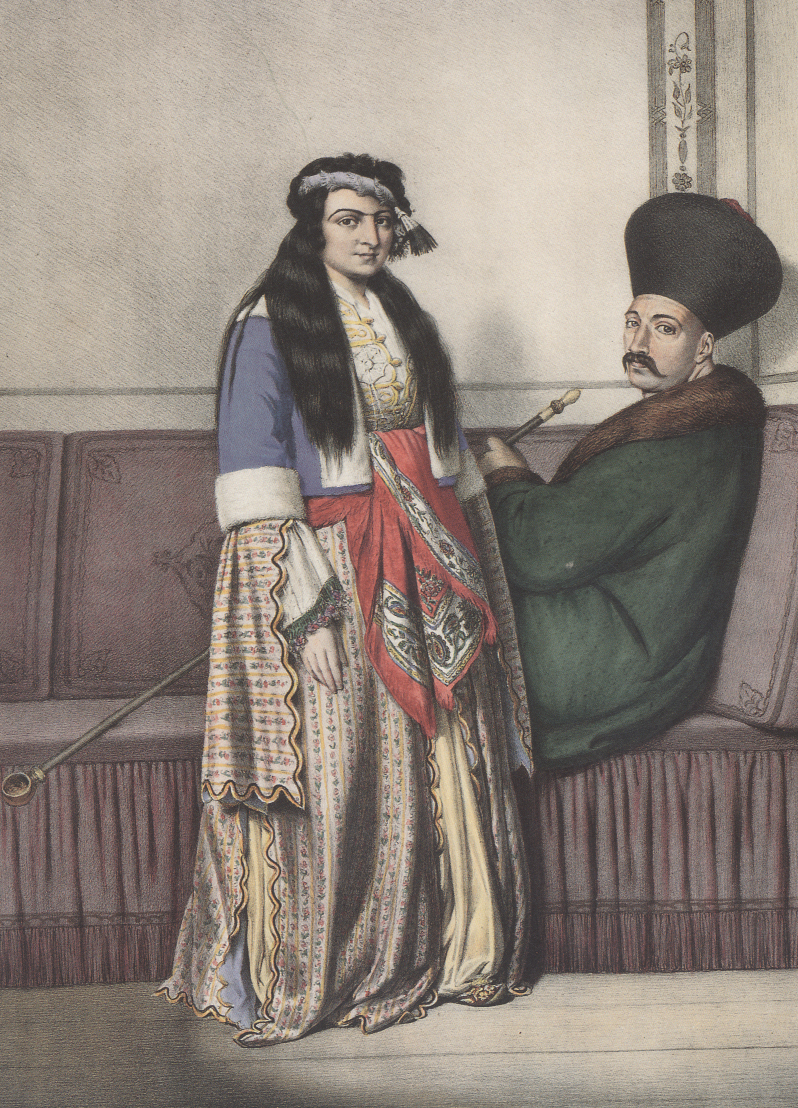
An Armenian couple in Constantinople in early 19th century by Louis Dupré.

Armenians in Istanbul by years
Year	TOTAL	Armenians	%
1478	100,000 – 120,000	5,000–6,000	~5%
1844	891,000	160,000–222,000	18–25%
1880s		250,000	
1885	873,565	156,861	18%
1913	1,125,000	163,670	15%
2011	13,483,052	50,000 – 70,000	0.4–0.5%
2021	15,840,900	50,000 – 70,000	0.3–0.4%

Armenians in Istanbul (Armenian: Պոլսահայեր, romanized: Bolsahayer; Turkish: İstanbul Ermenileri) are a major part of the Turkish Armenian community and historically one of the largest ethnic minorities of Istanbul, Turkey. The city is often referred to as Bolis (Պոլիս) by Armenians, which is derived from the ending of the historical name of the city, Constantinople.

== History ==
Armenians have been living in Constantinople since the fourth century. An Armenian parish was established in 572. Armenians flourished in Byzantium and there were many Byzantine emperors of Armenian origin.

In the early 17th century, according to traveler Simeon of Poland, there were five Armenian churches in Constantinople at the time: Surp Nikoghayos, Surp Asdvadzadzin, and Surp Sarkis in the neighborhood of Langa, another church in Balat, and Surp Georg in Sulumanastır. Apart from monks, there were 4–5 vardapets, 3 bishops, and over 100 priests in the city. He put the number of native Armenian households only at about 80, while Anatolian Armenian households that took refuge in Constantinople, Galata, and Üsküdar after the Celali rebellions were more than 40 thousand.

The Armenian community was made up of three religious denominations: Catholic, Protestant, and Apostolic, the Church of the vast majority of Armenians. The wealthy, Constantinople-based Amira class, a social elite whose members included the Duzians (Directors of the Imperial Mint), the Balyans (Chief Imperial Architects), and the Dadians (Superintendent of the Gunpowder Mills and manager of industrial factories).

The Ottoman Empire's Armenian genocide during World War I began with the deportation of 250 prominent Armenians from Constantinople.

Today, most estimations put the number of Armenian-Turkish citizens in Istanbul at 50,000, 60,000 or 70,000. They constitute the largest Christian and non-Muslim minority in Istanbul, as well as in Turkey. They are not considered part of the Armenian Diaspora by the Ministry of Diaspora, since they have been living in their historical homeland for more than four thousand years. In addition to local ethnic Armenians who are Turkish citizens, there are also between 10,000 and 30,000 recent illegal immigrants from Armenia in Istanbul.

=== Institutions ===
At present, the Armenian community in Istanbul has 20 schools (including the Getronagan Armenian High School), 17 cultural and social organizations, three newspapers (Agos, Jamanak, and Marmara), two sports clubs (Şişlispor and Taksimspor), and two health establishments, as well as numerous religious foundations set up to support these activities.

== See also ==
- Demographics of Istanbul
- Organization of Istanbul Armenians
- Armenians in the Ottoman Empire
- Armenians in Turkey
- Armenian Patriarchate of Constantinople
- Kurds in Istanbul
