= Zahrad =

Turkish poet (1924–2007)

- Born: Zareh Yaldizciyan; 10 May 1924; Constantinople, Turkey
- Died: 20 February 2007 (aged 82); Istanbul, Turkey
- Occupation: Poet
- Writing career
- Pen name: Zahrad; Զահրատ
- Language: Armenian

Zareh Yaldizciyan (Armenian: Զարէհ Եալտըզճեան; 10 May 1924 – 20 February 2007), better known by his pen name Zahrad (Զահրատ), was a poet who lived in Turkey and wrote poems in the Armenian language.

== Biography ==
Of Armenian descent, Zahrad was born in the Nişantaşı district of Istanbul, Turkey. His father, Movses, had been a jurist, adviser, and translator for the Ottoman Foreign Ministry. However, he had lost his father at the age of three. His mother, Ankine, was from the district of Samatya. Zahrad grew up with his maternal grandfather Levon Vartanyan.

In 1942 he graduated from Özel Pangaltı Ermeni Lisesi, the local Mechitarist Armenian lyceum. He attended the Faculty University of Medicine in Istanbul but left in order to work. Due to the fear that his family wouldn't appreciate the fact that he wanted to be a poet, he changed his pen name to "Zahrad". In November 1963, he married Anayis Antreasian.

== Legacy ==
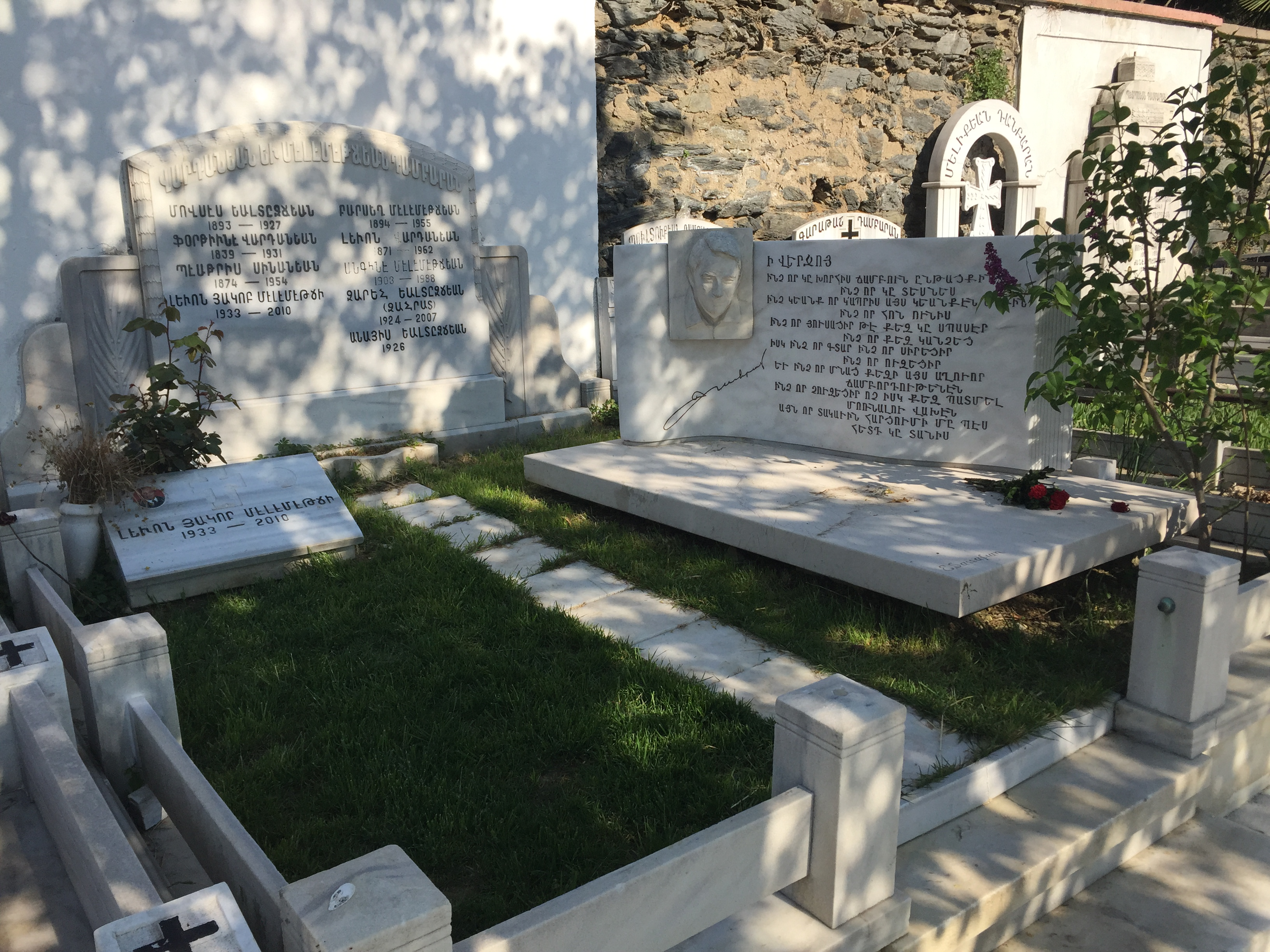
Zahrad's tomb at the Şişli Armenian Cemetery in Istanbul

Levon Ananyan, the president of the Writers Union of Armenia, characterized Zahrad as "the huge oak tree of diasporan poetry, whose literary heritage had a deep and stable influence upon modern poetry of not only the diaspora, but also Armenia." Writer and journalist Rober Haddeciyan is quoted as saying, "all the roads taken by our poems don't lead to Rome, but to Zahrad". His poetry has been translated into 22 languages.

President of Armenia Robert Kocharian has awarded Zahrad with the Movses Khorenatsi medal for his contribution to Armenian literature and culture.

== Works ==
- «Մեծ քաղաքը» (Big City, Istanbul, 1960)
- «Գունաւոր սահմաններ» (Colored Borders, Istanbul, 1968)
- «Բարի Երկինք» (Kind Sky, Istanbul, 1971)
- «Կանանչ հող» (Green Soil, Paris, 1976)
- «Մէկ քարով երկու գարուն» (Two Springs with One Stone, Istanbul, 1989)
- «Մաղ մը ջուր» (A Sieve of Water, Istanbul, 1995)
- «Ծայրը ծայրին» (A Tight Fit, Istanbul, 2001)
- «Ջուրը պատէն վեր» (Water Up the Wall, Istanbul, 2004)
- «Մարկոս եւ Մարկոս» (Marc and Marc, ?, ?)
