= Karekin Arutyunov =

Ukrainian politician, former People's Deputy of Ukraine

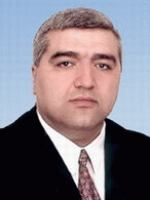
Арутюнов Гарегін Рафаелович

Karekin Arutyunov is a Ukrainian politician, former People's Deputy of Ukraine and businessman.

== Biography ==
Karekin Rafaelovich Arutyunov was born on December 29, 1964, in Tbilisi, Georgia.

In 2005 he graduated from the Dnipropetrovsk National University, specialty "Finance and Audit".

Since 1995 he has been the Head of Armenian community in Dnipropetrovsk. Chairman of the Parish Council of the Armenian Apostolic Church in Dnipropetrovsk. Since 2002 Karekin Arutyunov has been the Member of the Dnipropetrovsk City Council in two convocations.

In November 2007 Arutyunov became People's Deputy of Ukraine in the 2007 parliamentary election for Yulia Tymoshenko Bloc (as member of "Bat'kivshchina" party (since 1998)), No. 106 in the list. He was frequent absent in parlement.

Although he was originally placed on the election list of "Bat'kivshchina" for the October 2012 Ukrainian parliamentary elections the Central Election Commission of Ukraine (CEC) excluded him from this list because Arutyunov had not give consent for entry on the list and had not submit documents to the CEC. In September 2012 he was dismissed as chairman of the Donetsk regional party organization "due to passive participation in the election campaign in 2012" (he had held this position since 2010).

== See also ==
- List of Ukrainian Parliament Members 2007
- List of politicians of Armenian descent
