= Kurds in Istanbul =

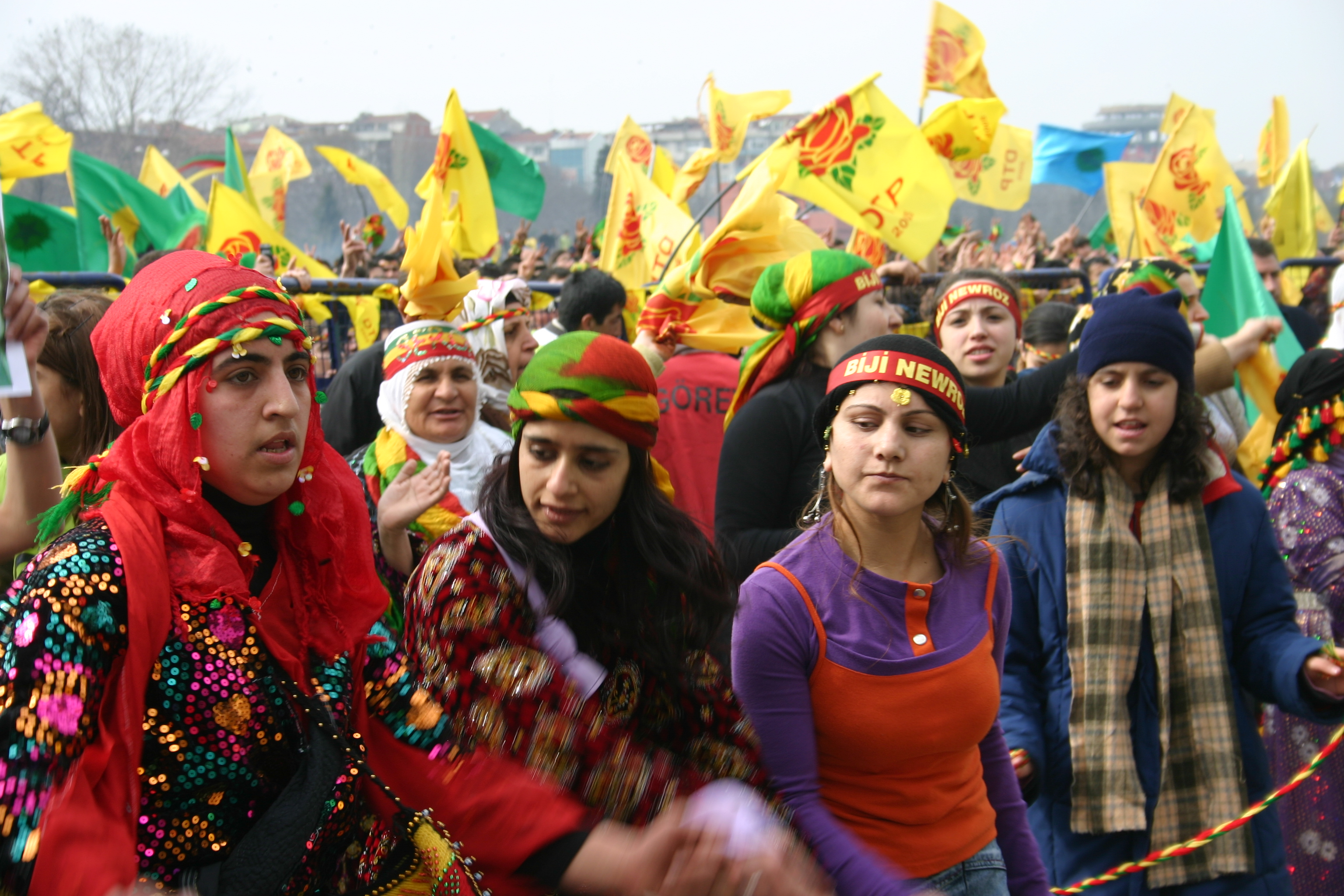
Newroz celebrations in Istanbul in 2006

The total number of Kurds in Istanbul is estimated variously from 3 to 4 million. Because Istanbul is widely accepted to house the largest Kurdish population in any city in the world, it is often dubbed as the biggest Kurdish city.

== Demographics ==
=== Total population ===
The Kurdish population in early 20th century is estimated at roughly 10 thousand people, who were composed of ayans and their families but also some laborers.

In 1995, the Kurdish Human Rights Watch estimated that the Kurds in Istanbul numbered ca. 2 million. In 1996, Servet Mutlu estimated that the Kurds were 8.16% (594,000) of Istanbul instead of the often stated 1.5 million. In 1998, the German Foreign Ministry stated that there were 3 million Kurds in Istanbul. In 1997, American diplomat John Tirman regarded a PKK official's claim of 4 million Kurds in Istanbul as "exaggerated."

According to a 2019 KONDA study, Kurds constituted around 17% of Istanbul's adult total population who were Turkish citizens.

=== Neighborhoods with Kurdish communities ===
- Karayolları, Gaziosmanpaşa: Kurdish majority
- Gazi, Gaziosmanpaşa: mixed
- Esenyurt
- Tarlabaşı
- Fatih
- Bağcılar
- Zeytinburnu
- Kanarya,Küçükçekmece

== History ==
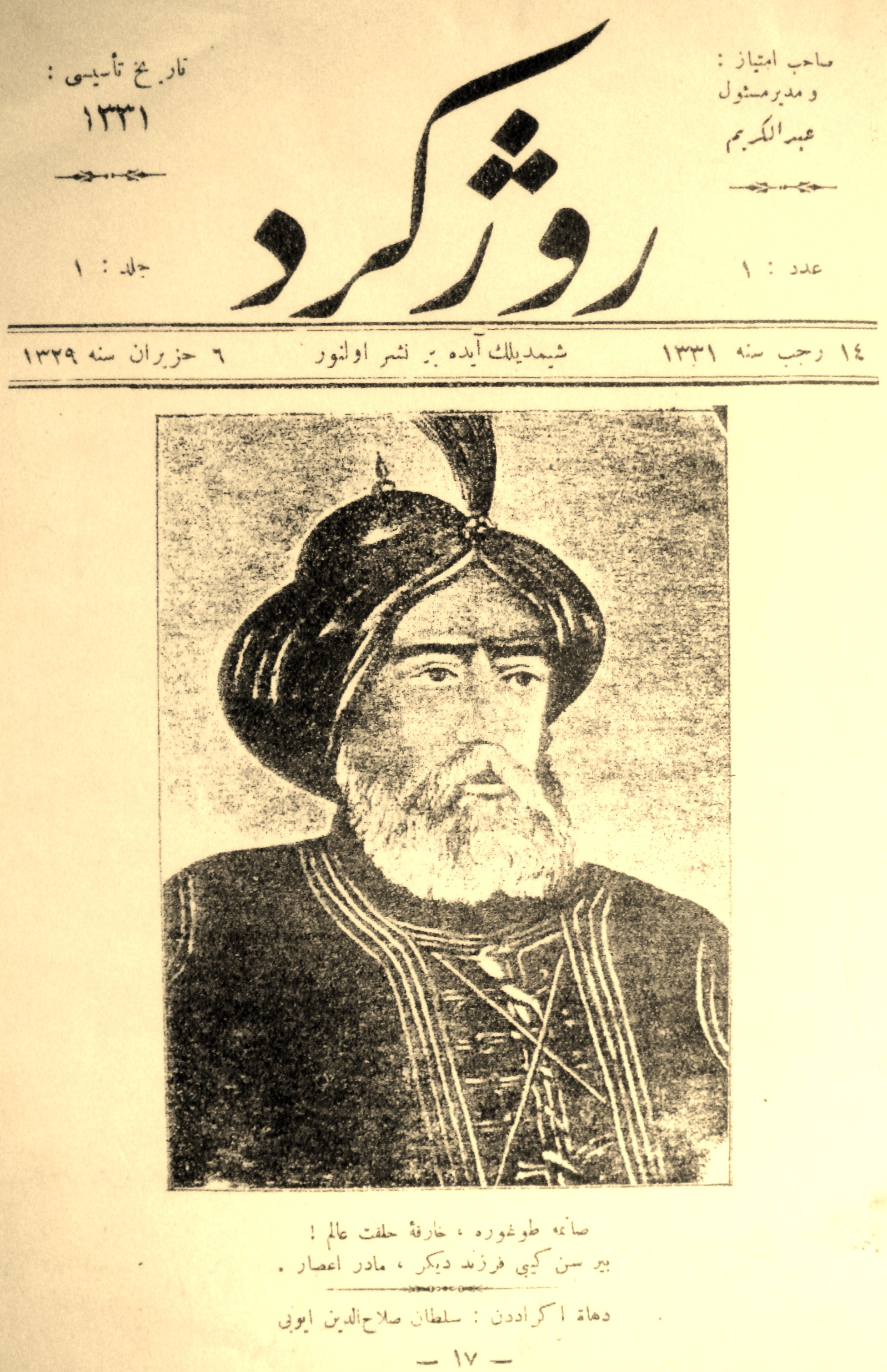
A Kurdish magazine published in Istanbul in 1913

The first Kurdish cultural and political associations were established in Istanbul. During the reign of Abdulhamid II (r. 1876–1909) the Kurds began producing literature on the condition of the Kurds in Istanbul. In 1918, Kurdish intellectuals established the Association for the Rise of the Kurds in Istanbul.

In the 1990s Kurds evicted from their villages by the Turkish military have settled in Esenyurt, Istanbul. In March 1995 Kurdish riots broke out in Istanbul.

== Culture ==
Kurds in Istanbul have played an important role in establishing Kurdish theatre scene in the country. Evicted from their homeland Kurdistan, the Kurds of Esenyurt perceive it as a "lived space". They often watched the Kurdish television broadcast from Europe Med TV.

== Organizations ==
- Kurdish Institute of Istanbul

== See also ==
- Minorities in Turkey
- Kurds in Turkey
- Armenians in Istanbul
