= Selina Özuzun Doğan =

Turkish politician (born 1977)

Member of the Grand National Assembly
- In office 7 June 2015 – 24 June 2018
- Constituency: Istanbul 2nd electoral district (June 2015)

Personal details
- Born: Selina Özuzun; January 1, 1977 (age 49) Istanbul, Turkey
- Party: Republican People's Party (CHP)
- Spouse: Erdal Doğan
- Children: Two
- Parent: Yervant Özuzun (father)
- Education: Law
- Alma mater: Galatasaray University; Istanbul Bilgi University
- Occupation: Politician
- Profession: Lawyer

Selina Özuzun Doğan (born Selina Özuzun in 1977), aka Selina Doğan, is a Turkish politician of Armenian ethnicity who served as a member of the Turkish Parliament, between 2015 and 2018. She became one of the first Armenian members of Turkey’s parliament in decades, alongside Markar Esayan (AKP) and Garo Paylan (HDP).

== Family life ==
She was born in 1977 in Istanbul. After completing her secondary education at the French high school Lycée Notre Dame de Sion Istanbul, she received a degree in law at Galatasaray University, and then took a master's degree from Istanbul Bilgi University. Furthermore, she began her professional career working in a law firm and serving as a lawyer for the minority foundations.

She is married and has two children.

== Politician career ==
Selina Özuzun Doğan was nominated as a candidate for the June 2015 general election by the Republican People's Party (CHP). Upon agreeing with the proposal of minority groups to have a representative in the parliament, Kemal Kılıçdaroğlu, leader of CHP, put her name on the first place of the party's candidate list for Istanbul 2nd Constituency.

On June 7, 2015, she was elected into the parliament, and became so the first Armenian members of the Grand National Assembly in decades alongside Garo Paylan (HDP) and Markar Esayan (AKP). Apart from Hermine Kalustyan, who served six months in the Constituent Assembly of Turkey (Turkish: Kurucu Meclis) after her appointment by the military junta following the 1960 Turkish coup d'état, Özuzun Doğan is the only female Armenian member of the parliament in the history of Turkish politics.

She was not re-nominated as a CHP candidate for the 2018 general election.
