= Organization of Istanbul Armenians =

Non-profit organization located in California, USA

Organization of Istanbul Armenian's Logo

The Organization of Istanbul Armenians (OIA) is a non-profit organization located in Winnetka, California which is dedicated to preserving the Armenian heritage. It was founded in 1976 by a group of Armenians from Istanbul. This organization represents mainly the Istanbul Armenian community that is scattered throughout Southern California.

== See also ==
- Armenian Diaspora
