= Garo Paylan =

Turkish politician (born 1972)

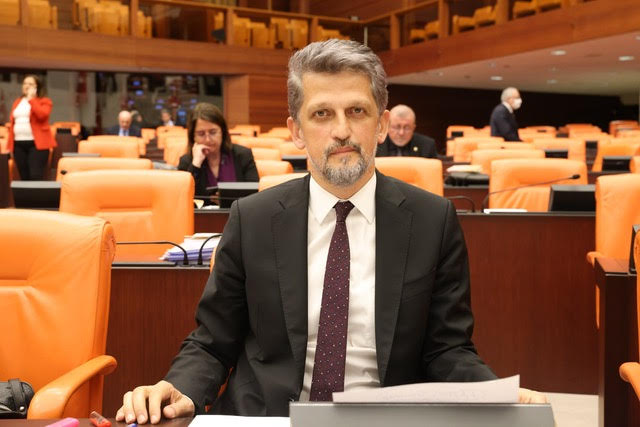

Member of the Grand National Assembly
- In office 7 June 2015 – 14 May 2023
- Constituency: Istanbul (III) (June 2015, Nov 2015); Diyarbakır (2018)

Personal details
- Born: 1972 (age 53–54) Istanbul, Turkey
- Citizenship: Turkish
- Party: Peoples' Democratic Party (HDP)
- Education: Istanbul University's School of Business
- Occupation: Politician

Garo Paylan (Armenian: Կարօ Փայլան, born 1972) is a politician from Turkey and one of the country's leading democracy activists. Paylan was among the few Armenians elected to the Grand National Assembly of Turkey and served for 2 consecutive terms in 2015–2018 and 2018–2023, representing Istanbul and Diyarbakir. He is a founding member of the Peoples' Democratic Party (HDP) and since 2016, was the first Armenian in the history of the Republic of Turkey to publicly discuss the Armenian Genocide of 1915 from the podium of the Turkish parliament. Paylan is recognized for his activism on human rights and minority rights in Turkey and has been the recipient of several awards, including the Grand Vermeil Medal and has been twice nominated for the Nobel Peace Prize.

== Early life and activism ==
Garo Paylan was born in Turkey in 1972 to an Armenian family originally from Malatya. His grandparents on both sides were survivors of the Armenian Genocide and Paylan said “I grew up in a household with my grandmother, who an orphan who had lost her entire family. I don’t need a document [to know what happened]. My grandmother is my document.”

He graduated from Istanbul University's School of Business and worked in family shoe manufacturing business. He has served as a board member and coordinator of Armenian community schools in Istanbul, working on multi-lingual education projects. After the assassination of Armenian journalist Hrant Dink, Paylan dedicated his career to civil society and was a founding member of “Friends of Hrant Dink”, a group established to seek justice for the 2007, assassination of Armenian journalist Hrant Dink. The group organized a yearly vigil in Istanbul on the anniversary of Dink's murder starting 2008.

== Political career ==
Garo Paylan was among the participants that started the People's Democratic Congress in 2011 and in 2013 became a founding member of the Peoples' Democratic Party (HDP), which was established as a progressive coalition and supported a peaceful resolution to the Kurdish conflict.

On June 7, 2015, he was elected into the Grand National Assembly as a representative of Istanbul's 3rd electoral district and was among the few Armenian members ever elected to the Turkish parliament, alongside Selina Özuzun Doğan (CHP) and Markar Esayan (AKP). Paylan was re-elected in the snap elections of November 2015 and then as a Diyarbakir deputy in the Parliamentary Elections on 24 June 2018. He was an active member of the parliament working on economic issues and minority rights.

=== Armenian Medz Yeghern ===
After his elections in 2015, Paylan vowed to fight against Armenian Aghed denial and for reconciliation on the Armenian issue inside Turkey. In April 2016, Paylan spoke at the general assembly on the 101st anniversary of the Armenian Aghed, and read out loud the names of Ottoman Armenian politicians and intellectuals who were arrested and killed after being taken away from their homes on April 24, 1915. In April 2021, he submitted an amendment for the recognition of Armenian deportation by the Turkish Parliament: “The place to discuss this great tragedy is this parliament. If we do this, what other parliaments say becomes irrelevant. The only place that would heal the wound of Armenian nation is this parliament.” Paylan submitted a similar proposal in 2022 but was harshly criticized by the Turkish President, Recep Tayyip Erdogan, and the leader of the nationalist MHP, Devlet Bahceli.

=== Religious and minority rights ===
During his eight years in the Turkish parliament, Paylan was a vocal critic of the Turkish government's approach towards Christian and Jewish minorities and advocated for a pluralist and a democratic Turkey.

In 2022, Paylan went on a tour of eastern Turkey to identify and document churches and synagogues in the countryside facing destruction and ruin, including the Surp Bartholomes in Baskale, Van, dating back 1600 years. Paylan visited 20 sites in Turkey's Eastern countryside and identified hundreds of churches and synagogues that were either in ruins or facing ruin, including Diyarbakir’s last synagogue, a 15th-century building in Çermik . Paylan made videos of these historic monuments to raise awareness and called on Ministry of Culture and Tourism to preserve the buildings.

Paylan highlighted problems faced by Turkey's Christian community's religious and educational foundations, and in 2022 called on the government to allow self-governance the foundations by the members of the community. Paylan called for a government investigation into reports in 2019 that at a Turkish summer camp for girls, kids were encouraged to shout “death to Jews”.

Paylan highlighted discrimination against non-Muslim minority communities during his time in the parliament, including the 6–7 September 1955 pogroms against Jewish, Greek, and Armenian communities in Istanbul and sought to submit a bill to the parliament to declare that date “Memory Day.” He also called for the removal of street names that honored the perpetrators of the Armenian deportations, most significantly Talat Pasha, equating it to calling streets in Germany in memory of Adolf Hitler.

=== Budget Committee ===
From 2015 to 2023, Paylan served as a member of the Turkish parliament's Budget Committee. He scrutinized the government's budgetary choices and economic governance and was a frequent commentator on economic issues in Turkish media. Paylan frequently appeared in Turkish media and criticized Turkish government’s controversial policy in 2018-2023 of selling central bank reserves to stabilize the Turkish Lira, arguing that it was depleting Turkey's central assets and creating a risky economic situation.

=== Political attacks and persecution ===
Paylan was physically attacked on 2 May 2016 inside the Turkish parliament during a subcommittee meeting on constitutional reform and suffered minor injuries. He said the attack was planned and that he was subject to racist slurs about his Armenian identity from deputies of the governing Justice and Development Party. A week later, Minister of Justice, Bekir Bozdağ, blamed Paylan for starting the fight. Paylan responded by saying Bozdağ's remarks were slanderous. He said he was attacked because of his ethnic Armenian identity.

Turkey's Human Rights Association released a statement condemning the violence against Paylan. The statement said that the attacks against him were due to his Armenian origins. and condemned various racial slurs that were said to him such as "the Armenian bastard".

In 2017, Paylan's speech at the general assembly was cut off when he said, “Our diversity was lost through massacres and deportation” and he was banned from the general assembly for three sessions.

In 2020, during the 44-day war between Armenian and Azerbaijan, Paylan was targeted by a full-page ad in Sabah by the nationalist Eurasia Institute of Strategic Affairs and accused of committing “treason” for calling on an end to the Azeri-Armenian war. Paylan filed legal complaint about the advertisement and wrote in an op-ed in the New York Times, “As an Armenian from Turkey and a descendant of deportation survivors, I know very well the meaning of this message.”

On 17 March 2021, the State Prosecutor for the Court of Cassation, Bekir Şahin, filed a lawsuit before the Constitutional Court demanding in an indictment that the pro-Kurdish HDP to be shut down due to the party's alleged organizational links with the Kurdistan Workers' Party (PKK). The United States Department of State opposed the closure of the HDP, suggesting such a decision to dissolve the HDP "would unduly subvert the will of Turkish voters, further undermine democracy in Turkey, and deny millions of Turkish citizens their chosen representation." Germany and EU rapporteur Nacho Sanchez Amor also criticized the case.

In the 2023 parliamentary elections, Paylan did not run for a third term, despite his popularity, because of HDP's policy of term-limits.

Throughout his two terms in the Turkish parliament, Paylan faced other allegations, including “praising a crime and criminal” for calling Selahattin Demirtas, imprisoned former co-chair of HDP “dear Selahattin.” In 2018, he faced two accusations, including “defaming Turkey and the Turkish state” and “insulting Turkishness” for his comments referring to the Armenian deportation.

In 2022, a 2016 assassination plot against Paylan was revealed by a former mafia lawyer. Paylan filed an official complaint and demanded a parliamentary inquiry. The alleged mastermind of the plot was detained, but later released with charges dropped. 424 intellectuals calling themselves “Friends of Garo” signed a petition and called on the government to investigate the allegations of threats to his life.

=== Police violence ===
Paylan has been an advocate of human rights and has shown solidarity with Saturday Mothers (Turkish: Cumartesi Anneleri), the group who has been meeting every Saturday in Galatasaray, Istanbul, since the 1990s to demand answers on the whereabouts of their "disappeared" relatives in Turkey. At the 700th meeting of Saturday Mothers, Paylan fought off a police effort to detain the demonstrators, including journalist Ahmet Şık and the son of Hrant Dink.

== Views ==
=== Armenia and Artsakh ===
During the war between Armenia and Azerbaijan in Nagorno Karabakh in 2020, he urged the Turkish Government to play a stabilizing role in the Caucasus and support a peace between Armenia and Azerbaijan.

In a New York Times op-ed “How Turkey’s Military Adventures Decrease Freedom at Home” on October 15, 2020, Paylan argued that rising nationalism in Turkey was linked to regional instability and democratic backsliding, “Turkey’s involvement in regional conflicts has whipped up nationalist fervor, obliterated space for advocates of peace and democracy and deepened a sense of fear and precarity among the minority populations. (…) Militant nationalism and authoritarianism can neither solve our domestic problems nor help the region. A better choice for my country will always be to seek regional peace and cultivate better ties with our neighbors. Turkey must encourage Armenia and Azerbaijan to return to peace talks and facilitate a lasting settlement to the Nagorno-Karabakh dispute."

=== LGBTQ+ rights ===
On 1 November 2022, in Yerevan, Paylan made an impromptu visit after meeting Armenia's prime minister Nikol Pashinyan earlier that day. Paylan stated, "If Armenia wants to be a democratic country, it should respect LGBTIQ rights."

== Awards ==
- Grand Vermeil Medal
- Freedom Award, Armenian National Congress of America, 2017
- Yerevan State University’s gold medal
- Nobel Peace Prize nominations (2018, 2020).

== See also ==
- Armenians in Turkey
- Hrant Dink
- Racism in Turkey
