= Markar Esayan =

Armenian author, journalist, and politician (1969–2020)

Member of Parliament for Istanbul, Turkey
- In office 23 June 2015 – 16 October 2020

Personal details
- Born: 4 February 1969 Istanbul, Turkey
- Died: 16 October 2020 (aged 51) Istanbul, Turkey
- Resting place: Şişli Armenian Cemetery
- Citizenship: Turkey
- Party: Justice and Development Party
- Education: Anadolu University Business Management School

Markar Esayan (4 February 1969 – 16 October 2020) was an Armenian author, journalist, and politician of Turkey. He was a member of the Grand National Assembly of Turkey for the Justice and Development Party representing Istanbul since 2015 and a member of his party's Central Decision-Making and Executive Board. He was one of the first Armenian members of Turkey's parliament in decades alongside Garo Paylan (HDP) and Selina Özuzun Doğan (CHP).

== Biography ==
Markar Esayan was born on 4 February 1969 in Istanbul. His father was a Christian Armenian, and his mother was a Muslim Circassian. He completed his elementary and secondary education at Private Bomonti Armenian Catholic Primary School, and his high school education at Private Getronagan Armenian High School. He graduated from Anadolu University Business Management School in 1995.

He first wrote intermittently for the Agos newspaper, and as a regular columnist from 2001, when Hrant Dink was the editor-in-chief, until about a year after Dink's assassination in 2007. Esayan also worked as the publishing coordinator and a columnist of Taraf daily newspaper, where he later temporarily assumed the role of editor-in-chief as well. He wrote for Yeni Şafak daily newspaper between 2013 and 2016 and for the daily newspaper Akşam since then until September 2020.

His first novel, The Cramped Room of the Present, won the 2004 Grand Prize of İnkılâp Kitabevi, and was published in 2005. His second novel, Encounter, was published in October 2007. Jerusalem was his third novel, which was published in 2011.

He also has two other non-fiction books: Good Things, published in 2011, includes his various articles and essays. 60 Days That Stopped the World: Square, Coup d'etat, Democracy, co-authored with Cemil Ertem and published in 2013, offers a comprehensive analysis of Gezi Park protests in a broad historical and geographical context.

Esayan was a AKP member of parliament for Istanbul during the 25th, 26th and 27th Terms of TBMM (Grand National Assembly of Turkey). He was elected as the Vice Chairperson of the European Union Compliance Committee and member of Turkey – European Union Joint Parliamentary Committee.

In various articles he wrote for Taraf and Sabah daily newspapers Esayan described the 1915 "Catastrophe" as Armenian genocide.

In an interview published in daily Yeni Şafak on 6 July 2015, Markar Esayan said:

Every person has a sub-identity. I'm a Christian Armenian. And our supra-identity is citizenship of Turkey. You can not separate them from one another. I love my homeland, my neighbors. I'm happy to have been born in this country, happy to be a citizen of Turkey. I can say these thanks to the quiet revolution of AK Party. For we could not feel it like that.

Esayan died on 16 October 2020 from gastric cancer, aged 51. Markar Esayan was buried at Şişli Armenian Cemetery in Istanbul after a religious and state ceremony at the Surp Asdvadzadzin Patriarchal Church in Kumkapı, Istanbul on 22 October 2020. Speaking at the funeral, Sahak II Mashalian, the Patriarch of Armenians in Turkey thanked President Erdogan and other government officials for their presence: "Such a participation is the first in the history of Armenians in Turkey." Patriarch Sahak II also touched upon the ongoing 2020 Nagorno-Karabakh war, and said: "In these hottest days of the Karabakh conflict, sharing our pain in an Armenian Church has meaningful messages. This sad war in the Caucasus is not a religious war. It is not even the war of the Armenian and Azerbaijani nations. It is a struggle for land, and a difficult knot left between the peoples by the imperialist mind. Wars and conflicts are details for neighboring peoples who have experienced hundreds of years of friendship. What matters is the basins of lasting friendship to be created together."

== See also ==
- List of members of the Grand National Assembly of Turkey who died in office
