= Vartan Pasha =

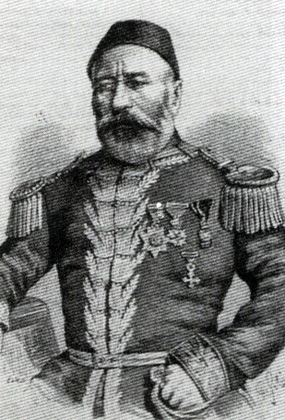
- Born: Hovsep Vartanian; 1813
- Died: 1879 (aged 65–66)
- Occupations: statesman, author, and journalist

Hovsep Vartanian (Armenian: Յովսէփ Վարդանեան, Yovsēpʿ Vartanean), better known as Vartan Pasha (Armenian: Վարդան փաշա; 1813 – 1879), was an Ottoman Armenian statesman, author, and journalist of the 19th century, promoted to the rank of pasha after three decades in the service of the state. He is also notable for his novel "Akabi's Story" (Akabi Hikâyesi) and for having published the bilingual magazine Mecmua-i Havadis, an important reference in the history of the Turkish written press.

His novel is, according to the Austrian Turkologist Andreas Tietze who re-edited it and had a transcription published in 1991, the first genuine novel published in Turkey or, according to another viewpoint, "one of the five early, contemporaneous and intermediate works of fiction that were clearly distinct from earlier prose traditions in both Divan and folk literature, and that approximate novelistic form."

The question of which was the first Turkish novel is still debated. The first Turkish novel has often been considered to be Sami Frashëri's "Love affair between Talat and Fitnat" (Ta'aşşuk-ı Tal'at ve Fitnat), published in 1872. On the other hand, although written in Turkish, Vartan Pasha's "Akabi's Story", because of its fully Armenian context, can also be considered as the first Armenian novel that saw print (Khachatur Abovian's Wounds of Armenia having been published in 1858).

== Biography ==
Hovsep Vartanian (Armenian: Յովսէփ Վարդանեան), was born in 1813 to Catholic Armenian parents. At the age of 13, he set out for Vienna, where he was enrolled in the school of Mechitarists. Upon returning to the Ottoman Empire, he worked as a teacher for a couple of years, after which he took up a post in 1837 in the Dragoman's office of the Ottoman Empire. Rising through the ranks of the state bureaucracy, he was promoted to the rank of "Pasha" at the same time as his assignment as a founding member to the Ottoman Academy (Encümen-i Daniş), established along lines similar to those of the Académie française and which also acted as a consultative council for the Sultan. He wrote the novel "Akabi's Story" in 1851, while he was a member of the Academy, and a long story, also in Turkish, treating the deep divide and the strife between Orthodox and Catholic Armenians, a secondary theme in Akabi's novel, followed the next year. After his retirement, he started and managed the magazine "Mecmua-i Havadis", bilingual in Turkish and Armenian. He also wrote a biography of Napoleon I of France. Vartan Pasha died in 1879.

== Akabi's Story ==
The novel relates an impossible love story between two young people issued from different communities which cultivate hostility between each other, either latent or evident, in the true fashion of Romeo and Juliet and many other stories produced by different cultures throughout the ages. Akabi is a daughter of Orthodox Armenians, and Hagop, her reciprocated lover, is a Catholic. Despite being an early novel and having been written by a male writer, Akabi's character is the more prominent of the two principal heroes. Furthermore, although a Catholic himself, Vartan Pasha is totally impartial in his observations on the behavior of the characters from the two communities, advantaging neither one nor the other, and not shying away from criticizing both. The novel is rich in its number of secondary characters and in short but astute depictions of these. Nevertheless, although social issues are briefly or indirectly touched upon, the definite central theme of the novel is love. And love has a number of rules independent of the social environment from which it rose. The loved one dominates the relationship and the lover has to suffer a lot and make many efforts to reach his beloved, and this well after the brief initial period of happiness till the tragic end.
