= Marmara (newspaper) =

Armenian-language daily newspaper

Marmara Մարմարա
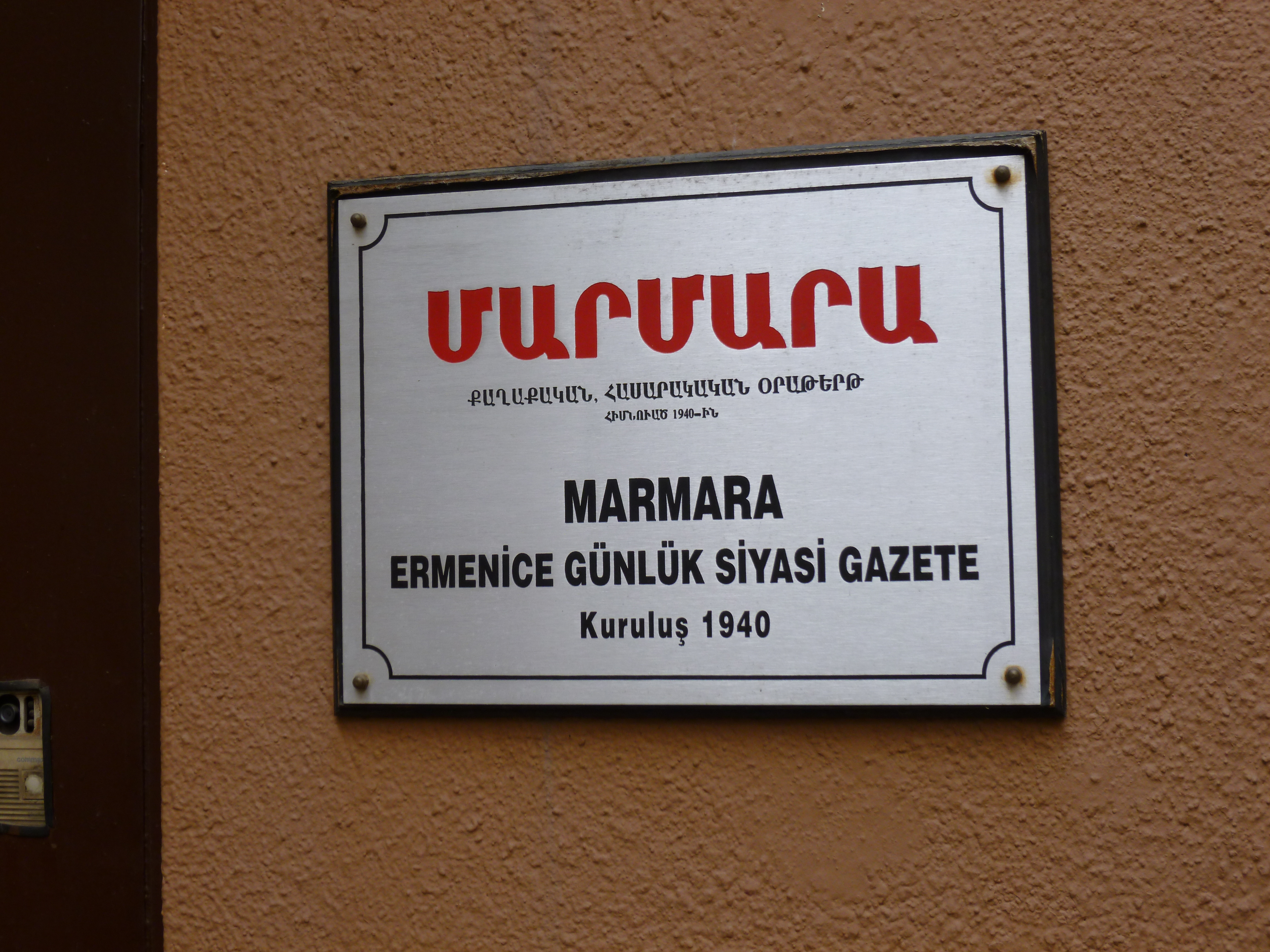
- Type: Daily newspaper
- Format: Broadsheet
- Owner(s): Ari Haddeler
- Editor: Ari Haddeler
- Founded: 1940
- Language: Armenian (daily); Turkish language supplement (weekly)
- Headquarters: Istanbul, Turkey
- Website: normarmara.com

Marmara (Armenian: Մարմարա) (sometimes "Nor Marmara" - New Marmara) is an Armenian-language daily newspaper published since August 31, 1940 in Istanbul, Turkey. It was established by Armenian journalist and foreign correspondent Souren Shamlian. Initially a weekly newspaper, it was soon published daily due to intense interest. Following Shamlian's death in 1951 his daughter and her husband, Seta and Bedros Zobyan, took over the paper. When the Zobyans left Istanbul for Canada in 1967, they left the paper to Rober Haddeciyan (also known as Robert Haddeler), a writer and journalist who was already working for the paper.

Marmara is published six times a week (except on Sundays). The Friday edition contains a section in Turkish as well. Circulation is reported at 2500 per issue.

In September 2023, the newspaper reported being in financial difficulties. The editor, Ari Haddeler, was quoted saying:

The main reason for our inability to attract ads is the dwindling number of our readers. There are very few people left who can read and understand Armenian. That's why we see a bleak future ahead [...] Don't they realize that by preferring digital and free platforms, they are harming themselves as well? History is written by newspapers. In a community that will be left without newspapers tomorrow, they too will lose their chance to take their place in history.

He called to see the newspaper as cultural heritage rather than as a commercial enterprise.
