= Rober Haddeciyan =

Armenian writer and playwright (1926–2025)

- Ռոպէր Հատտէճեան
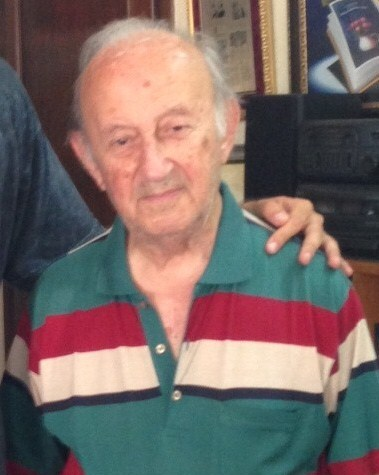
- Born: Rober Haddedjian; 26 January 1926; Istanbul, Turkey
- Died: 6 September 2025 (aged 99)
- Occupations: Writer; playwright; editor‑in‑chief
- Notable work: Arasdagh (Ceiling)

Rober Haddeciyan (also spelled and pronounced as Haddedjian) (Armenian: Ռոպէր Հատտէճեան; 26 January 1926 – 6 September 2025), also known as Rober Haddeler, was a Turkish-Armenian writer, playwright and editor-in-chief of Marmara, an Armenian-language daily newspaper from 1967 until his death.

Marmara (also known as Nor Marmara) is published six times a week (daily except Sundays). Circulation is reported at 2,200 per issue.

== Life and career ==
Rober Haddeciyan was born on 26 January 1926 in the district of Bakırköy in Istanbul, Turkey, to Avedis Haddeciyan and Siranush. He graduated from the Pangaltı Armenian Mkhitarist High School in 1944 and is an Istanbul University Faculty of Letters Department of Philosophy graduate. Haddeciyan, who was already working for Marmara as a journalist, became the editor-in-chief of the newspaper in 1967. His columns in Nor Marmara were translated into Turkish by his daughter-in-law Karolin Haddeler and published in the weekly Turkish supplement. He published 50 to 60 books. One of his most famous books is his novel Arasdagh (Առաստաղ, Ceiling), which has also been published in Turkish under the title Tavan.

Haddeciyan died on 6 September 2025, at the age of 99.

== Awards ==
In 2011, on the occasion of the 20th anniversary of Armenia's Independence, President Serzh Sargsyan awarded Haddeciyan the Mesrob Mashdots Medal for his contributions to Armenian literature, theater, and journalism.
