= List of Turkish Armenians =

Turkish Armenians include:

== Academia ==
- Daron Acemoğlu (born 1967), economist at MIT; winner of John Bates Clark Medal, and the Nobel Prize in Economics
- John Basmajian (1921–2008), medical doctor and anatomist at Queen's University and McMaster University
- Hagop Vahram Çerçiyan (1894–1967), professor of mathematics, geography, and calligraphy at the Robert College
- Karekin Deveciyan (1868–1964), zoologist, grandfather of French politician Patrick Devedjian
- Agop Dilâçar (1895–1979), linguist and specialist in Turkic languages, specialist of the Turkish Language Association
- Lerna Ekmekçioğlu (born 1979), historian at the Massachusetts Institute of Technology
- Agop Jack Hacikyan (1931–2015), literary scholar, historian, professor of Literary Studies at the Royal Military College Saint-Jean
- Aret Karademir (born 1982), professor of philosophy at the Middle East Technical University
- Ani Kavafian (born 1948), classical violinist and professor at the Yale School of Music
- Arman Manukyan (1931–2012), economist and lecturer at Boğaziçi University
- Manoug Parikian (1920–1987), concert violinist and professor at the Royal Academy of Music
- Paris Pişmiş (1911–1999), astronomer and professor at the National Autonomous University of Mexico
- Agop Terzan (1927–2020), astronomer and author of the Terzan Catalogue
- Nishan Yaubyan (1928–2022), architect and lecturer at Yeditepe University
- Levon Zekiyan (born 1943), Armenologist, philosopher, professor of Armenian Language and Literature at Ca' Foscari University of Venice, Pontifical Oriental Institute of Rome and Istanbul University

== Arts and entertainment ==
- Marc Aryan (1926–1985), singer, songwriter, and record producer
- Şahan Arzruni (born 1943), pianist
- Ara Bekaryan (1913–1986), painter and portrait artist
- Gilbert Biberian (1944–2023), guitarist and composer
- Zehra Bilir (1913–2007), folk singer
- Hayko Cepkin (born 1978), musician
- Jaklin Çarkçı (born 1958), mezzo-soprano of the Istanbul State Opera
- Ari Edirne (born 1978), opera singer
- Özdemir Erdoğan (born 1940), singer, songwriter, composer and State Artist
- Ayla Erduran (1934–2025), classical violinist
- Mari Gerekmezyan (1913–1947), first female sculptor of Turkey
- Masis Aram Gözbek (born 1987), conductor of Boğaziçi Jazz Choir
- Ara Güler (1928–2018), photojournalist
- Harutyun Hanesyan (1911–1987), violist and composer
- Rober Hatemo (born 1974), pop singer
- Sami Hazinses (1925–2002), actor
- Güven Hokna (born 1946), actor
- Azniv Hrachia (1853–1920), actor and director
- Jak İhmalyan (1922–1978), painter
- Ani İpekkaya (born 1939), actress
- Richard Jeranian (1921–2019), painter, draftsman and lithographer
- Cem Karaca (1945–2004), rock musician
- Toto Karaca (1912–1992), stage actress
- Sirvart Kalpakian Karamanuk (1912–2008), composer
- Ida Kavafian (born 1952), classical violinist and violist
- Shamiram Kelleciyan (1870–1955), kanto singer and songwriter
- Udi Hrant Kenkulian (1901–1978), oud player
- Yaşar Kurt (born 1968), rock artist
- Garo Mafyan (born 1951), musician, composer and music producer
- Edgar Manas (1875–1964), composer, conductor and musicologist; co-composer of the Turkish National Anthem
- Adile Naşit (1930–1987), actress
- Ferdi Özbeğen (1941–2013), musician
- Selim Naşit Özcan (1928–2000), actor
- Kenan Pars (1920–2008), actor
- Haig Patigian (1876–1950), sculptor
- Sibil Pektorosoğlu, pop singer
- Kamer Sadık (1911–1986), actor
- Maryam Şahinyan (1911–1996), photographer, first woman studio photographer in Turkey
- Gérard Serkoyan (1922–2004), opera singer
- Ruhi Su (1912–1985), folk musician
- Cenk Taşkan, musician
- Alin Taşçıyan (born 1969), veteran film critic, journalist, and editor
- Nubar Terziyan (1908–1993), actor
- Zilan Tigris (1972–2023), singer
- Danyal Topatan (1916–1975), actor
- Anta Toros (born 1948), actress
- Onno Tunç (1948–1996), musician
- Arto Tunçboyacıyan (born 1957), avant-garde folk and jazz multi-instrumentalist and singer
- Anahit Yulanda Varan (1917–2003), street performing musician and accordionists
- Rosy Varte (1923–2012), actor
- Marten Yorgantz (born 1946), singer and composer
- Sarkis (born 1938), conceptual artist

== Business ==
- Krikor Apikoğlu (1878–1945), founder of Apikoğlu
- Garo H. Armen (born 1953), co-founder and CEO of Agenus, Inc
- Sevan Bıçakçı (born 1972), jeweller
- Avedis Kendir (born 1959), jeweller
- Berç Türker Keresteciyan (1870–1949), bank executive and politician; vice chairman of the Turkish Red Crescent

== Politics ==
- Selina Özuzun Doğan (born 1977), lawyer and politician; member of the Grand National Assembly of Turkey
- Markar Esayan (1969–2020), journalist and politician; member of the Grand National Assembly of Turkey
- Hermine Agavni Kalustyan (1914–1989), mathematician, educator; member of the Grand National Assembly of Turkey
- Voskan Martikian (1867–1947), member of the Ottoman Parliament and Grand National Assembly of Turkey
- Garo Paylan (born 1972), politician and member of the Grand National Assembly of Turkey

== Religion ==
- Archbishop Khajag Barsamian (born 1951), Pontifical Legate of Western Europe and representative of the Armenian Apostolic Church to the Holy See
- Sebouh Chouldjian (1959–2020), metropolite of the Diocese of Gougark of the Holy Armenian Apostolic Church
- Yeghishe Derderian of Jerusalem (1911–1990), Armenian Patriarch of Jerusalem (1960-1990)
- Patriarch Shenork I Kaloustian (1913–1990), 82nd Armenian Patriarch of Constantinople
- Archbishop Karekin II Kazanjian (1927–1998), 83rd Armenian Patriarch of Constantinople
- Archbishop Sahag II Mashalian (born 1962), 85th Armenian Patriarch of Constantinople
- Archbishop Mesrob II Mutafyan (1956–2019), 84th Armenian Patriarch of Constantinople
- Husik Santurjan (1920–2011), Archbishop of the Armenian Apostolic Church
- Mikail Nersès Sétian (1918–2002), Apostolic Exarch of United States of America and Canada (1981-1993)
- Hovhannes Tcholakian (1919–2016), Archbishop of the Armenian Catholic Church

== Sports ==
- Can Arat (born 1984), football player for Fenerbahçe and Turkey national football team
- Dave Coskunian (1948–2005), football player for Los Angeles Toros and U.S. national soccer team
- Garo Hamamcıoğlu (born 1945), former football player, chairman of the sports club Taksim SK
- Garbis İstanbulluoğlu (1927–1994), football player for Turkey national football team and coach
- Alen Markaryan (born 1966), leader of Çarşı, leading fan group of Beşiktaş J.K., columnist
- Aras Özbiliz (born 1990), football player playing for the Armenia national football team
- Alex Sarkisian (1922–2004), college football player; played for Northwestern University
- Faruk Süren (born 1945), former chairman of Galasaray S.K.

== Literature and journalism ==
- Hagop Ayvaz (1911–2006), publisher of Kulis, the first Armenian theater magazine in Turkey
- Nona Balakian (1918–1991), literary critic and an editor at the New York Times Sunday Book Review
- Zaven Biberyan (1921–1984), writer, editor and author
- Vahagn Davtyan (1922–1996), poet and translator
- Arat Dink (born 1979), journalist and the executive editor of Agos
- Hrant Dink (1954–2007), journalist and former editor of the weekly Agos
- Yervant Gobelyan (1923–2010), poet and writer
- Rober Haddeciyan (1926–2025), writer, playwright and editor-in-chief of Marmara
- Vartan İhmalian (1913–1987), writer
- Etyen Mahçupyan (born 1950), journalist, writer, columnist
- Mıgırdiç Margosyan (1938–2022), writer
- Hrand Nazariantz (1880–1962), journalist and poet
- Sevan Nişanyan (born 1956), writer and lexicographer
- Yetvart Tomasyan (born 1949), founder of Aras Publishing
- Zahrad (1924–2007), poet

== Miscellaneous ==
- Jirayr Ohanyan Çakır (1923–2003), chess player, coach, and former president of the Turkish Chess Federation
- Rakel Dink (born 1959), human rights activist and head of the Hrant Dink Foundation
- Zaruhi Kavaljian (1877–1969), first female physician of Armenian descent in Turkey
- Nerses Krikorian (1921–2018), chemist and intelligence officer at Los Alamos National Laboratory
- Artin Penik (1921–1982), committed suicide in response to ASALA bombings

== See also ==
- Armenians in Turkey
- List of Ottoman Armenians
- Lists of Armenians
- Armenians in Istanbul
