= Şişli Armenian Cemetery =

Armenian Cemetery in Istanbul

Coordinates: 41.0639°N 28.9908°E

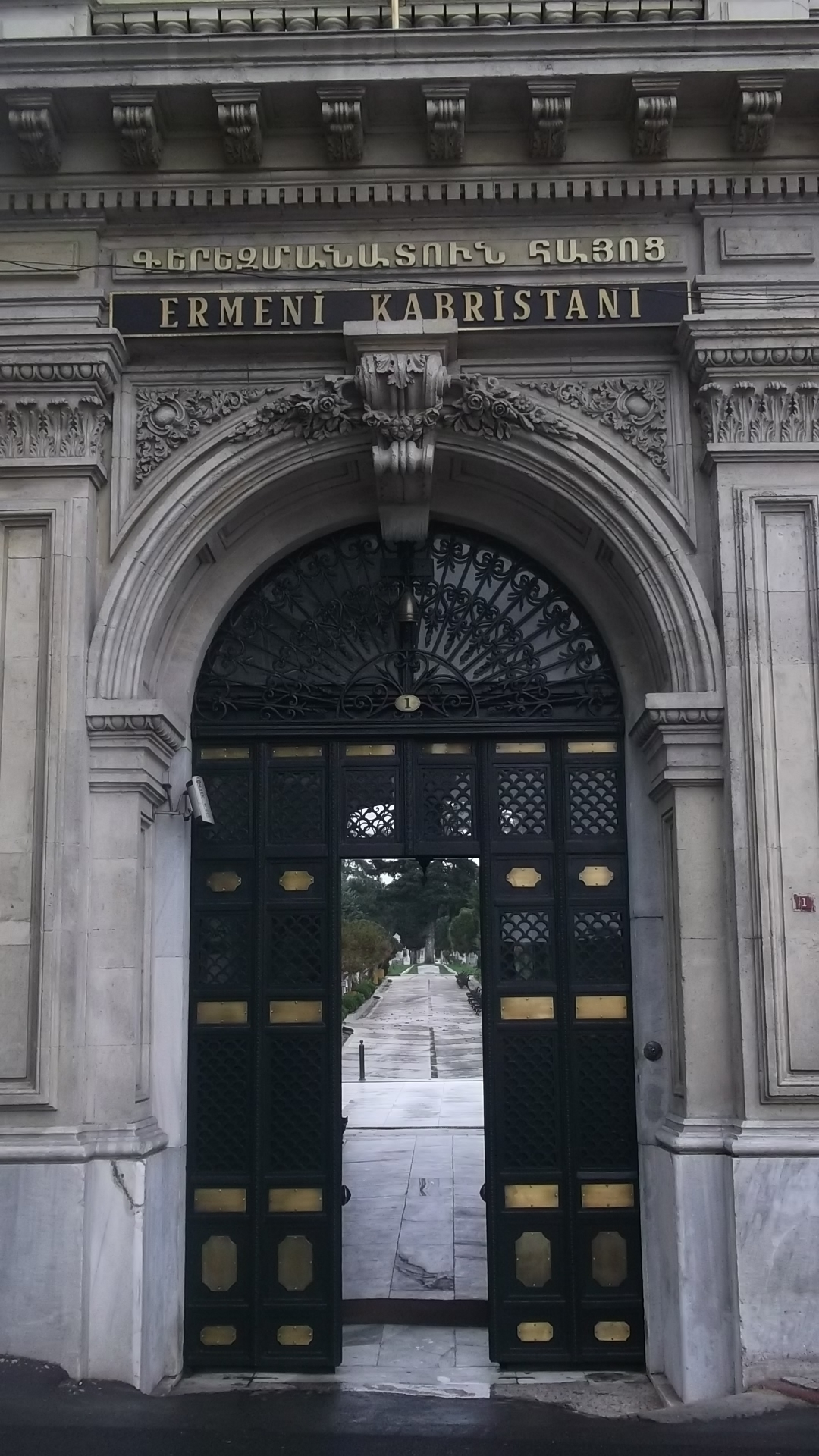
Main gate of the cemetery

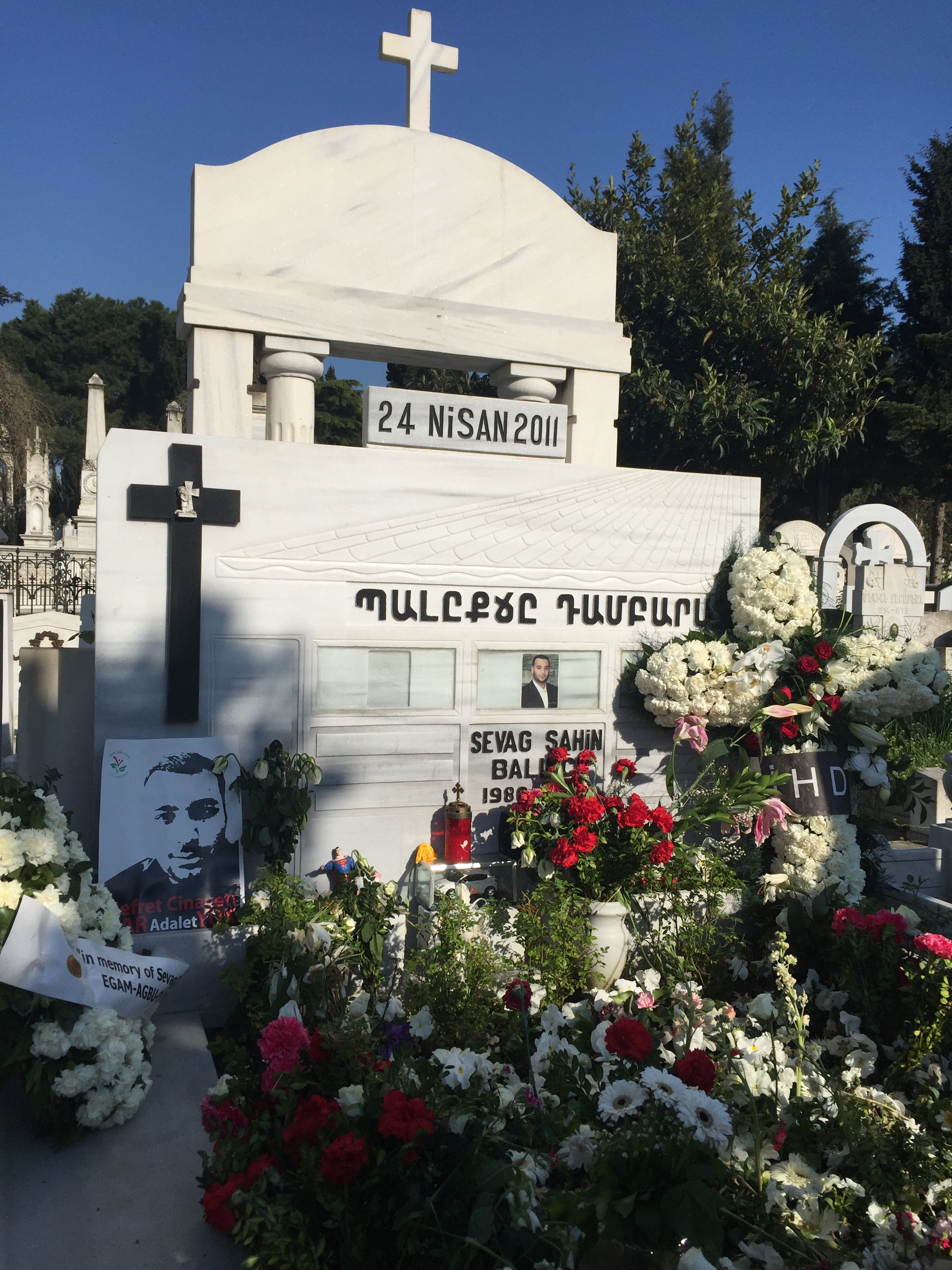
Balıkçı Family Tomb

The Şişli Armenian Cemetery is an Armenian cemetery in the Şişli district of Istanbul, Turkey, which is operated and served by the Armenian community of Turkey.

== Notable burials ==
- Hovhannes Arsharouni – Armenian Patriarch of Constantinople
- Simon Agopyan – Painter
- Zabel Sibil Asadour – Writer
- Sevag Balıkçı – murdered conscript in Turkish Military
- Hagop Baronyan - poet and satirist
- Zaven Biberyan – Writer
- Hagop Dilacar – Linguist
- Markar Esayan – Journalist and Politician
- Mari Gerekmezyan – Sculptor
- Ara Güler (1928-2018) – photojournalist
- Harutyun Hanesyan – Musician
- Udi Hrant – Musician
- Garbis İstanbulluoğlu – Footballer
- Toto Karaca – Actress
- Sirvart Karamanuk – Composer and Pianist
- Arman Manukyan – Professor
- Matild Manukyan – Businesswoman
- Haykanush Mark – Writer, poet
- Malachia Ormanian – Armenian Patriarch of Constantinople
- Stepan Papelyan – Musician
- Maryam Şahinyan – Photographer
- Nubar Terziyan – Actor
- Anta Toros – Actress
- Onno Tunç – Musician and Composer
- Yervant Voskan – Sculptor
- Anahit Yulanda Varan – female street performer playing the accordion
- Garbis Zakaryan – Boxer
- Zahrad – Poet
