= Garbis Zakaryan =

Turkish and European boxer (1930–2020)

Personal information
- Nickname: "Demir Yumruk" ("Iron Fist")
- Nationality: Armenian
- Born: Armenian: Կարպիս Զաքարեան; 2 June 1930
- Died: 25 January 2020 (aged 89) Istanbul, Turkey
- Weight: Welterweight

Boxing career

Garbis Zakaryan (Armenian: Կարպիս Զաքարեան), (June 2, 1930 – 25 January 2020) was a Turkish and European welterweight boxing champion of Armenian ethnicity. He was the first Turkish professional boxer. He was nicknamed "Demir Yumruk" ("Iron Fist").

== Life and career ==
Zakaryan was born in Istanbul, of Armenian descent, and studied at the local Armenian Esayan school. His father couldn't work because of poor health and his mother would make the entire household living from knitting. He left school at 5th grade and began working as a newspaper salesman. He began his boxing career in 1944 at the Boğaziçi Turnuvası (Bosporus Tournament). He became the Istanbul and Turkey champion at 48 kg in 1947 and 1948. He then represented the Turkish National Team for the first time in 1949 against Spain. He became the first Turkish professional boxer in 1951. Zakaryan retired in 1966. He then worked as a boxing trainer including European champion, Cemal Kamaci.

Zakaryan went on to lose his European champion title in March 1957. He was Middle-East champion in 1964.

Zakaryan died on 25 January 2020 at the age of 89 in Istanbul, Turkey. He was interred at Şişli Armenian Cemetery after the religious funeral ceremony at Surp Yerrortutyun Armenian Church (Armenian: Սուրբ Երրորդութիւն Եկեղեցի, Turkish: Beyoğlu Üç Horan Ermeni Kilisesi).

== Record ==
28 Wins (6 knockouts), 8 Losses (1 knockouts), 5 Draws
Res.	Record	Opponent	Type	Date	Location	Notes
Draw	32-13-6	(Italy) Franco Nenci	PTS	1966-04-15	Istanbul, Turkey	
Win	1-1	(Italy) Piero Morgia	TKO	1965-12-09	Istanbul, Turkey	
Win	0-1	(Lebanon) Maroun Jeres	PTS	1965-08-14	Beirut, Lebanon	
Win	5-5-3	(Tunisia) Abdulha Mohamed Djen Doubi	TKO	1965-03-20	Istanbul, Turkey	
Win	4-6	(France) Jean-Claude Labreuille	PTS	1964-12-02	Istanbul, Turkey	
Win	2-1-2	(Germany) Lothar Kremer	PTS	1964-09-17	Paris, France	
Win	2-1-2	(Germany) Lothar Kremer	PTS	1964-09-17	Paris, France	
Win	0-0	(Lebanon) Maroun Jeres	KO	1964-06-08	Istanbul, Turkey	Middle Orient Middleweight Title
Win	3-17-6	(Italy) Mario Della Corte	PTS	1964-04-09	Istanbul, Turkey	
Win	39-29-11	(France) Rene Brunet	PTS	1963-11-18	Istanbul, Turkey	
Win	66-65-20	(France) Jean Ruellet	PTS	1963-08-19	Istanbul, Turkey	
Win	38-26-10	(France) Rene Brunet	TKO	1963-03-27	Istanbul, Turkey	
Win	1-0-2	(France) Charles Attali	PTS	1960-10-12	Istanbul, Turkey	
Draw	1-0-1	(France) Charles Attali	PTS	1960-03-18	Istanbul, Turkey	
Win	0-1-0	(Syria) Mohammed Salah Mousri	PTS	1959-10-08	Istanbul, Turkey	
Loss	38-15-4	(Brazil) Paulo Sacoman	PTS	1957-11-22	São Paulo, Brazil	
Win	11-7-6	(France) Brahim Kettani	PTS	1957-11-10	Paris, France	
Loss	34-2-2	(Argentina) Martiniano Pereyra	TKO	1956-10-20	Buenos Aires, Argentina	
Loss	44-1-2	(Argentina) Cirilo Gil	PTS	1956-09-22	Buenos Aires, Argentina	
Loss	48-7-2	(France) Idrissa Dione	PTS	1956-08-18	Istanbul, Turkey	
Win	14-3-2	(Ivory Coast) Ousmane Cisse	PTS	1956-04-08	Beirut, Lebanon	
Loss	7-0-0	(France) Jacques Nervi	PTS	1956-03-17	Granville, France	
Win	16-1-0	(France) Michel François	PTS	1956-03-03	Paris, France	
Win	22-6-2	(Turkey) Ziyaris Taki	KO	1955-07-30	Istanbul, Turkey	Turkish Welterweight Title
Win	22-6-2	(France) Ahmed Belarbi II	PTS	1955-06-05	Istanbul, Turkey	
Draw	0-1-0	(Greece) Jan Papadopulos	PTS	1955-05-15	Alexandria, Egypt	
Win	19-7-8	(Germany) Karl Oechsle	PTS	1955-03-27	Istanbul, Turkey	
Win		(Greece) Emmanuel Lambidis	PTS	1955-02-27	Istanbul, Turkey	
Win		(Greece) Jan Papadopulos	PTS	1954-11-02	Beirut, Lebanon	
Loss	34-2-0	(France) Idrissa Dione	PTS	1954-02-05	Beirut, Lebanon	
Loss	33-2-0	(France) Idrissa Dione	PTS	1954-01-23	Istanbul, Turkey	
Win		(France) Brahim Kettani	PTS	1954-01-12	Istanbul, Turkey	
Win	22-30-7	(France) Emmanuel Clavel	RTD	1953-10-03	Istanbul, Turkey	
Win	15-3-2	(Turkey) Ziyaris Taki	PTS	1953-08-18	Istanbul, Turkey	Turkish Welterweight Title
Win	9-22-4	(France) Robert Astoine	PTS	1953-04-30	Paris, France	
Draw	16-15-31	(Germany) Freddi Teichmann	PTS	1953-04-17	Berlin, Germany	
Win	22-8-4	(Morocco) Charles Dhery	PTS	1953-03-14	Istanbul, Turkey	
Win	8-18-4	(France) Leandre Mateos	PTS	1953-01-13	Istanbul, Turkey	
Win	8-18-4	(Greece) Michel Lambidis	PTS	1951-12-23	Istanbul, Turkey	
Win	5-0-0	(Turkey) Ziyaris Taki	PTS	1951-05-02	Istanbul, Turkey	Precise date is uncertain. This fight is from a record provided by Leo Vollnhofer, Vienna.
Loss	2-0-0	(Turkey) Ziyaris Taki	PTS	1951-03-10	Istanbul, Turkey	Precise date is uncertain. This fight is from a record provided by Leo Vollnhofer, Vienna.
Draw	5-6-2	(France) Ali Amrane	PTS	1950-10-18	Istanbul, Turkey	

== See also ==
- Armenians in Turkey
