= Atlas Cinema =

Movie theatre in Istanbul

- Atlas Sineması
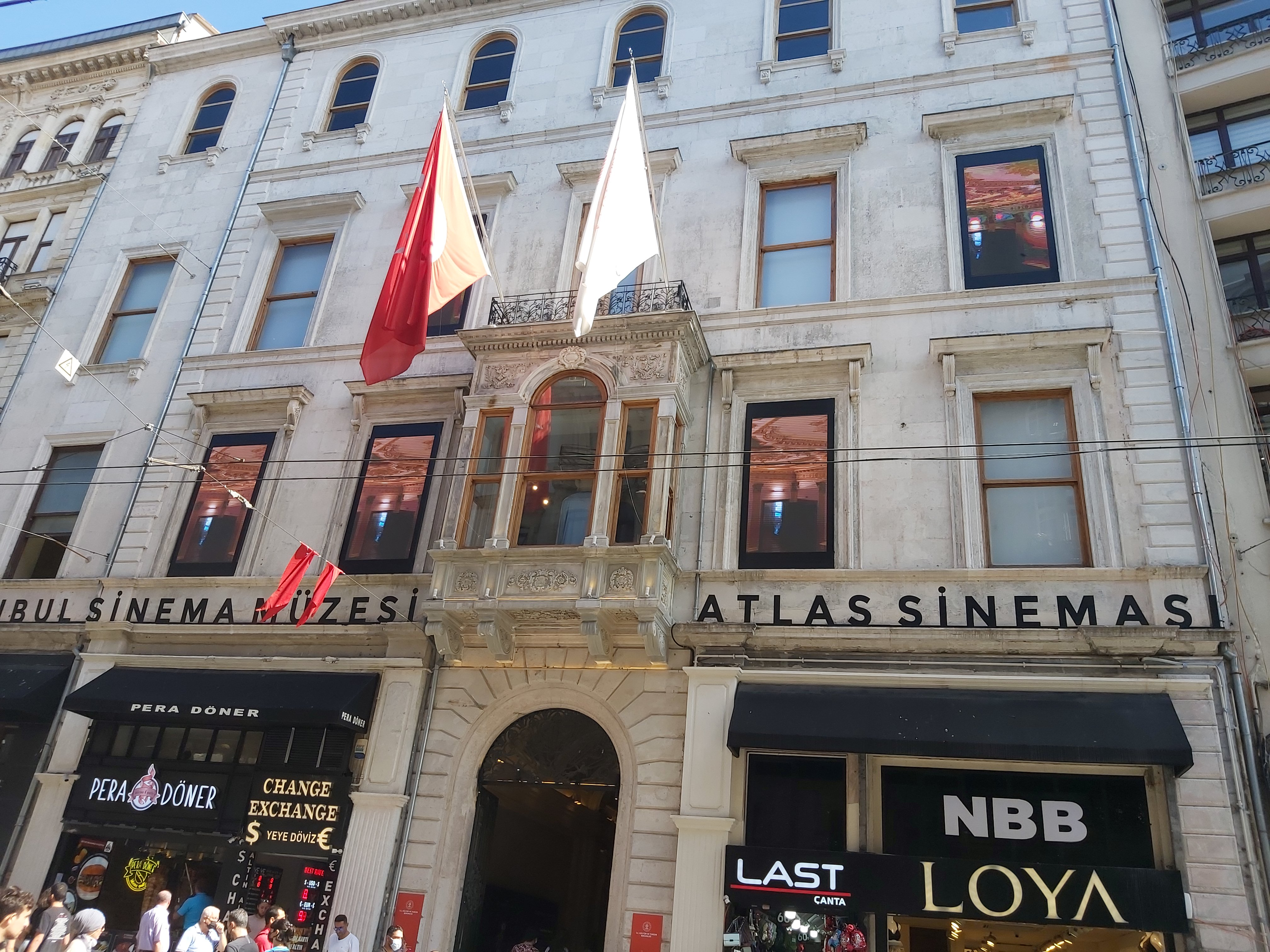

- Location within Istanbul
- Address: İstiklal Avenue 133; Istanbul; Turkey
- Location: Beyoğlu
- Coordinates: 41.0339°N 28.9796°E
- Owner: Ministry of Treasury and Finance
- Capacity: 500, 130, 85
- Type: Cinema

Construction
- Built: 1877; 149 years ago
- Opened: 19 February 1948; 78 years ago
- Renovated: 2019–2021
- Builder: Agop Köçeyan

Website
- www.beyogluatlas.com/atlas-sinemasi

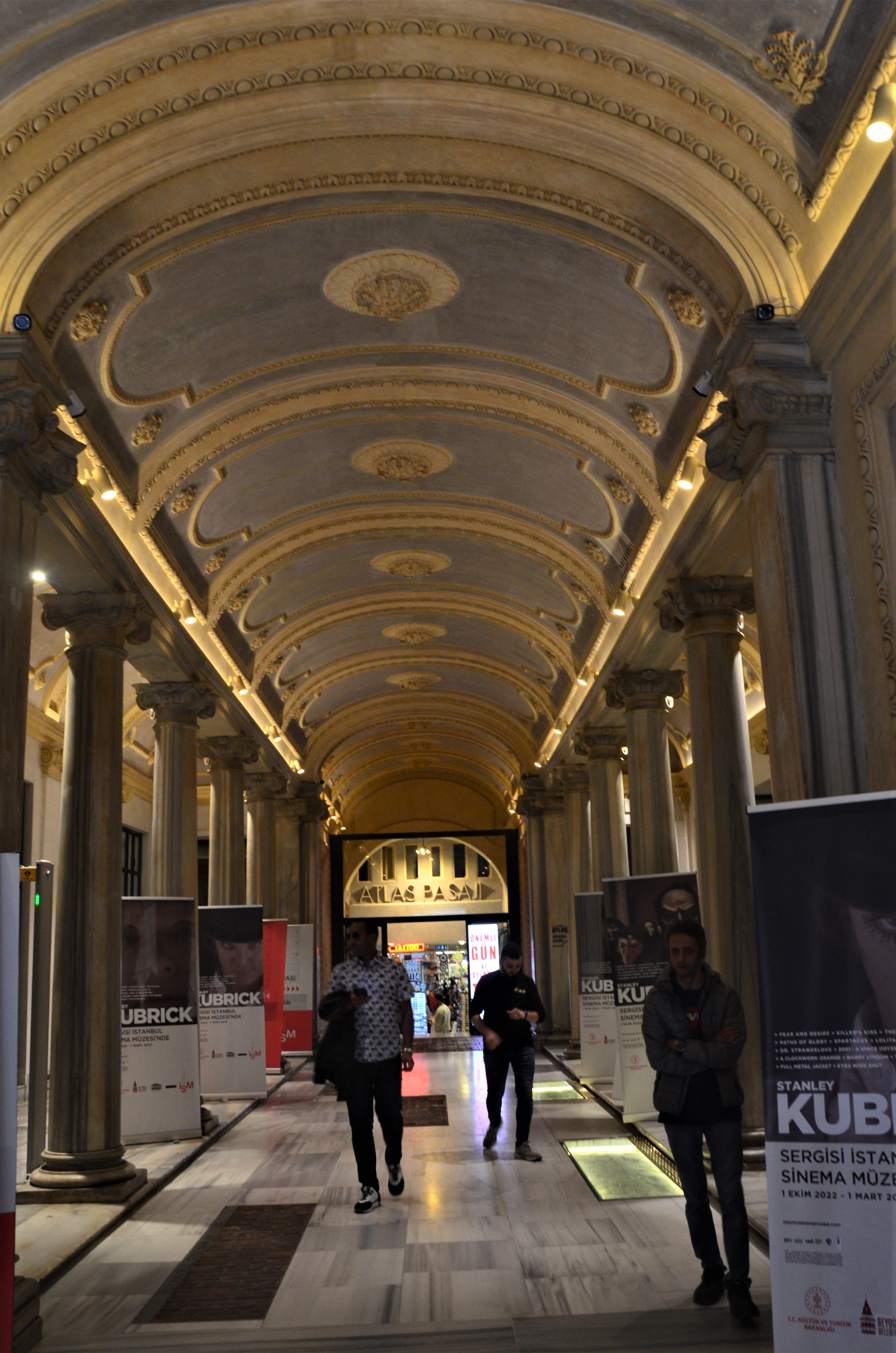
Passage of Atlas Cinema.

The Atlas Cinema also known as Istanbul Cinema Museum (Turkish: Atlas Sineması) is a movie theatre situated at İstiklal Avenue in the Beyoğlu district of Istanbul, Turkey. It opened in 1948. Between 2019 and 2021, it underwent a restoration.

== Background ==
Agop Köçeyan (1823–1893), also known as Köçeoğlu, was a member of a Galata banker family of Armenian ethnicity. The family had made a fortune by lending loans they received with low interest, from abroad, to the Ottoman Government and to the Ottoman palace at high interest. He was one of the prominent owners of real estate in different parts of Istanbul. Following the Great Fire of Pera in 1870, he purchased land in Galatasaray quarter, and built a winter residence in 1877. It was designed in Renaissance Revival architectural style resembling Villa Farnese in Italy; the building consisted of three blocks. The residence block has four stories and the building's block featuring a passage has three stories. The large space in the ground floor was used as a stable for the worthy horses of Köçeyan.

During the reign of Ottoman Sultan Abdul Hamid II (r. 1876–1909), Köçeyan fell out of favor, and his finance business deteriorated. He donated the building to the Surp Hovhan Vosgeperan Armenian Catholic Church. In the 1930s, two tobacco trading brothers purchased the building. After a short time, some parts of the building became one of the most popular entertainment venues in Istanbul. Businessman Dervişzade İbrahim established a music hall named "Moulin Rouge" in the former horse stables. Notable singers such as Safiye Ayla and Eftalya Işılay as well as musicians from Arab countries appeared on stage in the entertainment venue, which was later renamed to "Çağlayan". In the 1940s, Lütfullah Süruri and Suzan Lütfullah, parents of theatre actress Gülriz Sururi, used a part of the building as "Halk Opereti" ("People's Operetta"), where revues and operettas were staged.

In 1945, entertainment businessman Muhittin Öztuna restored the building. It turned into a cinema with 1,800 seats (1,660 floor and balcony seats, 140 seats in 35 boxes), and finally opened under the name "Atlas" on 19 February 1948. It became one of the biggest cinemas in Beyoğlu.

In the big complex building, further premises opened as a bar and restaurant "Kulis" ("Green room") in 1948 and a pocket theatre "Küçük Sahne Tiyatrosu" ("Small Stage Theatre") in 1951. In 1985, Atlas Cinema was transferred to the Ministry of Treasury and Finance. Since then, it has been operated by İrfan Atasoy and film director and producer Türker İnanoğlu.

Atlas Cinema hosted selected films during the annual International Istanbul Film Festival. The venue was temporarily shut down at the end of March 2020 due to COVID-19 pandemic in Turkey.

== After restoration ==
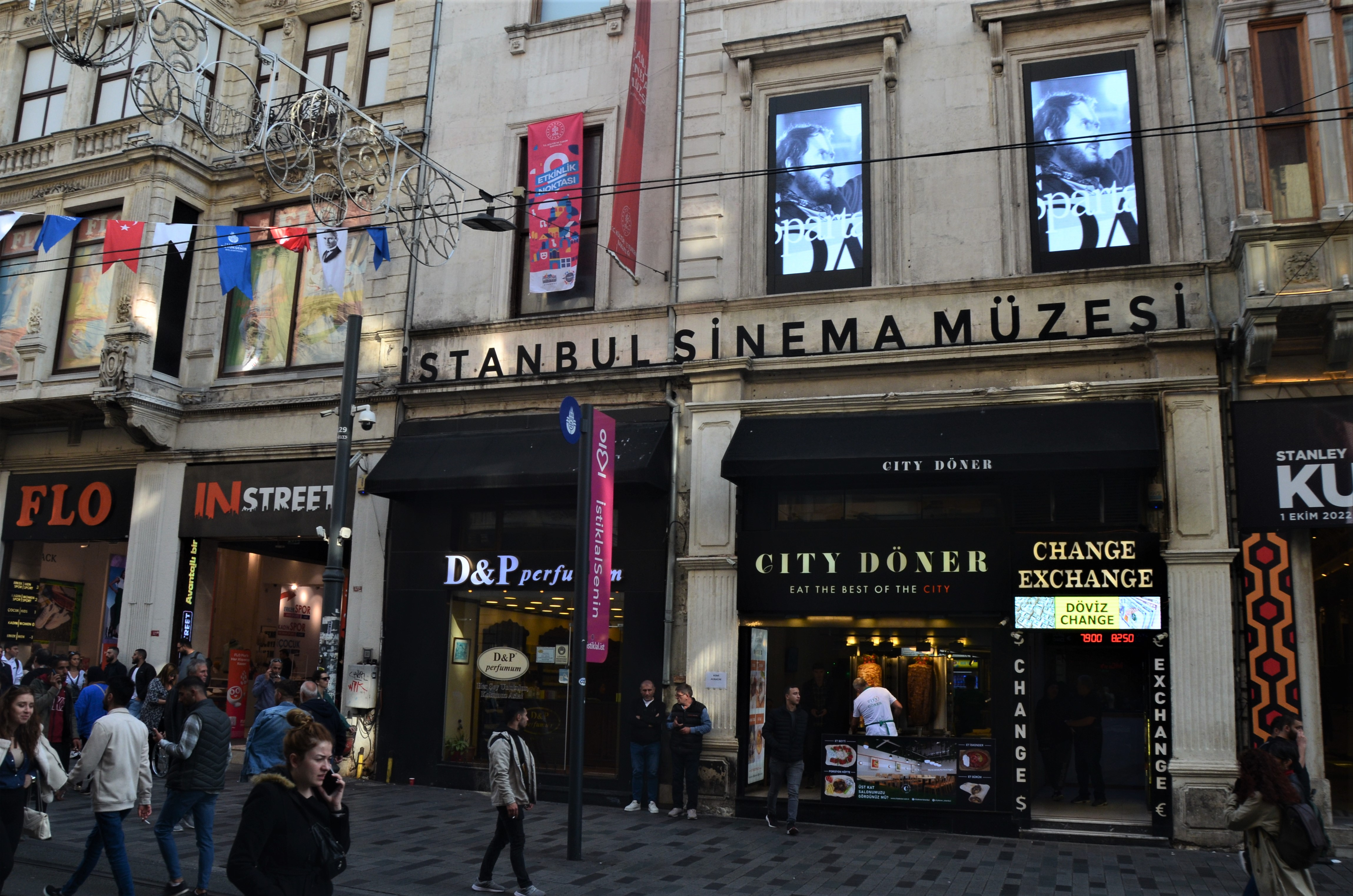
Istanbul Cinema Museum.

Between 2019 and 2021, the cinema building was restored by the Ministry of Culture and Tourism. Access to the cinema is through a passage, which is one of the renowned meeting points of Istiklal Avenue. The interior decorations such as the frames with gold leaf on the plaster on the walls and the ceiling ornaments hand-drawn by a French artist were renovated in accordance with the original. The cinema has three separate halls for 500, 130 and 85 cinemagoer. The main hall was designed as an amphitheatre. The balcony section was rebuilt as boxes for 2, 4, 6 and 8 spectators with recliners. The former stage theater building has been turned into "İstanbul Sinema Müzesi" ("Istanbul Cinema Museum").
