= Anta Toros =

Turkish actress (1948–2025)

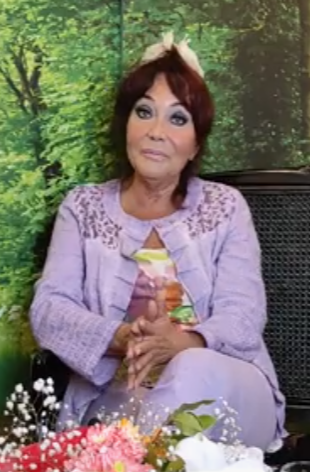
- Toros in a 2020 interview
- Born: Antaram Keşiş; 12 January 1948; Istanbul, Turkey
- Died: 30 August 2025 (aged 77); Bodrum, Muğla, Turkey
- Resting place: Şişli Armenian Cemetery
- Occupation: Actress
- Years active: 1965–2025
- Spouse: Misak Toros

Anta Toros (born Antaram Keşiş; 12 January 1948 – 30 August 2025) was a Turkish theater and film actress. She mostly played villains in her productions.

== Life and career ==
Antaram Keşiş was born in Istanbul on 12 January 1948, the daughter of ethnic Armenians Selma and Gabriel Keşiş. She lost her father at a young age. She graduated from Saint Benoit French High School and later continued her education at the Institut Montcalme in Lausanne, Switzerland.

Toros entered amateur theater in 1965. After training at the Dostlar Theater, she began her professional career in 1971 at the Gülriz Sururi-Engin Cezzar Theater. Toros, who has participated in companies such as the Ali Poyrazoğlu and Nisa Serezli-Tolga Aşkıner Theater, also pursued theater studies in the United States.

Toros worked with Vera Vlasova for three months and with Mitehel Mestor, a member of Actors Btudya, for one year. She was married to Misak Toros, also a theater actor and director, who died in 2010. From this marriage, she had a daughter, İrna Büyüksakayan.

Toros died in Bodrum, Muğla Province on 30 August 2025, at the age of 77. Anta Toros was buried at Şişli Armenian Cemetery after a funeral service held at the Surp Yerrortutyun Armenian Church in Beyoğlu, Istanbul on 8 September 2025.
