= Anahit Yulanda Varan =

Turkish musician

Anahit Yulanda Varan Անահիտ Յուլանդա Վարան

Background information
- Born: 1917; Beyoğlu, Istanbul Ottoman Empire
- Died: 29 August 2003 (aged 85–86) Istanbul, Turkey
- Genres: Folk, pop
- Occupation: Street performer
- Instrument: Accordion

Anahit Yulanda Varan (Armenian: Անահիտ Յուլանդա Վարան, 1917 – 29 August 2003), also known as Anahit Kuyrig, best known as "Madam Anahit", was a Turkish street performing musician who played the accordion. She appeared in a number of films in bit parts as an extra.

== Early years ==
Anahit Yulanda Varan was born into a wealthy Armenian family in Tarlabaşı neighborhood of Beyoğlu district, close to Taksim Square, in Istanbul, then Ottoman Empire in 1917. She had a brother, Vosge Apeğa, who was known as "Vosgik Vartabed", literally "Vosges the Preacher". Her mother had a passion for piano. She completed her primary education at Anarat Hığutyun Armenian Catholic School in Taksim, now Taksim Art House. She then graduated from Eseyan Armenian High School, also in Taksim.

== Musician career ==
She began performing music in high school, when she joined the school choir at age 16.

She spent the summer months of her youth years on Heybeliada, on the Princes' Islands. There she was impressed by the accordion-playing by the son of a Greek neighbor. She then convinced her mother to buy an accordion. She received a second-hand white-colored Hohner-make accordion, bought for 170 Turkish lira from a music instruments store owned by the Greek Papa Yorgi. She first went to the Church of St. Anthony of Padua on the Istiklal Avenue, put her accordion onto the altar and prayed for the realization of her dream.

Papa Yorgi arranged her a teacher for playing the accordion. She started to take lessons from Arto Benon, which were not low-priced at that time. After learning the basics, she changed her teacher. She took lessons from Nora Dırızyan, who became her first husband.

During her life between 30 and 35, she appeared in side roles as an extra in a number of films such as Babanın Suçu, Adalet, Yalancı Yarim, Cennet Çocukları, Kadın ve Şarap, Faize Hücum, Bay Alkolü Takdimimdir, Arkadaş, 24 Saat, Öğretmen. She featured in the media clip by Aşkın Nur Yengi and Grup Gündoğarken.

In her later years, she performed with her Hohner accordion at Çiçek Pasajı, a historic covered arcade, and Nevizade Street on the Istiklal Avenue with rows of cafes, tavernas, winehouses and restaurants. She became known as "Madam Anahit". She always appeared wearing a bright red lipstick. Her repertoire included popular Turkish-language tangos, Greek folk music Hasapiko, Armenian taverna music. She played the most popular songs "La Vie en rose" by Édith Piaf, "Yıldızların Altında" by Zeki Müren and "Lili Marleen" by Marlene Dietrich. She and her accordion became a symbol of nocturnal entertainment at Beyoğlu, and appeared in numerous photographs taken there.

== Private life ==
Her first husband, Nora Dırızyan, was a musician of Armenian ethnicity, who played the accordion, piano and contrabass. He performed a long time on the cruise ships Ankara and Samsun, and later at the music hall Beyaz Park in Büyükdere, Sarıyer, northern Istanbul. She remained married to him for 17 years. They had two sons, Onnik and Berç. After divorcing, she married a Turkish musician, Solak Hüseyin, literally "Hüseyin the Left-handed". Her second marriage, which lasted for a while, ended with divorce. Her third marriage was also unsuccessful. She then remarried her first husband.

She remembers that "it was very upsetting to see how the people I played the accordion and gave joy to for years were involved in the Istanbul pogrom attacking the Greek minority in Istanbul on 6–7 September 1955".

Her house in Tarlabaşı was confiscated and demolished in the late 1980s. She faced hard times as she did not receive any compensation, and had to move into a flat for rent.

A friend of animals, she was a paid member of the Animal Protection Association and attended many of its meetings.

== Death ==
She contracted stomach cancer but eventually died of heart failure on 29 August 2003. She was interred at Şişli Armenian Cemetery following the religious funeral service held in the Surp Yerrortutyun Armenian Catholic Church.

== Legacy ==
A Dutch television channel broadcast a documentary film about her life.

By November 2018, a music venue named "Anahit Stage" opened in her honor in Beyoğlu. The venue hosts a wide spectrum of polyphonic and multicolored music genre ranging from traditional to experimental, from classical to electronics.
