= Yasemin Mori =

Turkish alternative rock singer (born 1982)

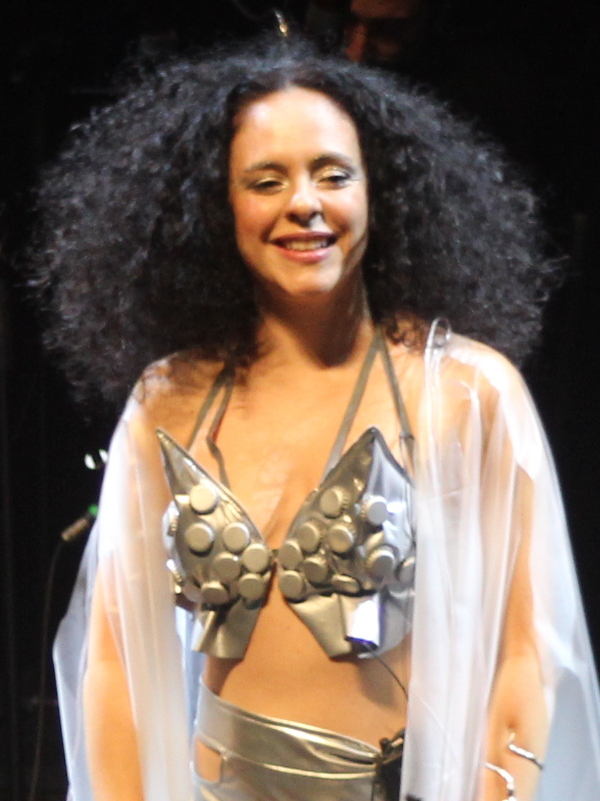
- After her collobrative concert in Antalya (September 2023)

Background information
- Born: Yasemin Aygün Savgı; 4 March 1982 (age 43)
- Origin: Ankara, Turkey
- Genres: Alternative rock, indie rock
- Occupation: Singer-songwriter
- Instrument: Vocals
- Years active: 2008–present
- Labels: Irmak Plak (2008); Balet Plak (2009); Dokuz Sekiz (2012–16); Sony (2017)
- Website: myspace.com/yasemori

Yasemin Aygün Savgı (born 4 March 1982), better known as Yasemin Mori, is a Turkish alternative rock singer.

== Biography ==
As daughter of military architect father and Edirne-born mother worked as a sales chief on Turkish Airlines, her original last name was Savgı. She chooses to go by the scene alias mori, which means girl in various ethnic Balkan Turkic dialects, and which was a name she was called by many of her friends as a young girl.

She composed her first song when she was a teenager with contributions of her elder sister's music record share. At a Kings of Convenience concert on Istanbul on July 6, 2005, she invaded the stage by dancing on her own. Her first album Hayvanlar was released on 10 July 2008 by Irmak Plak. Mori released her second studio album Deli Bando in October 2012 after three years of development, working with members of Korhan Futacı ve Kara Orkestra and Boğaziçi Jazz Choir.

Mori released her third album Finnari Kakaraska in March 2015, featuring Gel by Ajda Pekkan and Kanatları Gümüş Yavru Bir Kuş, a poem by Nazım Hikmet.

She occasionally shares her works and announcements via her own Tumblr page since August 2009, as 2004 graduate of the Department of Graphic Design at Bilkent University.

As having relationship with fellow music producer Serhat Şensesli since 2017, she gave birth to her first child, Milan on 10 July 2020. In spite of she once was against the marriage system, she married with Emre Irmak in May 2024, producer of her first album Hayvanlar.

== Discography ==
=== Studio albums ===
- Hayvanlar (2008)
- Deli Bando (2012)
- Finnari Kakaraska (2015)
- Estrella (2018)

=== Singles ===
- Dünya (2012)
- Muşta (Ç.A.K. live) (2013)
- Yine Buluşuruz (2016)
- Rampa Stampa (2020)
- Beni Bana Bırak (2020)
- Maviye (2021)
- Kırmızı Lavlar (2022)

=== Other works ===
Yasemin Mori features most of these works at her concerts, but she did not intend to release them on a new album, as she stated on MTV Turkey's talk show BeniMTV broadcast in October 2009, until she started working on development of Deli Bando in 2010.

- Bir Beyaz Balina (A white whale)
- Can Cambaz (Glass junglor)
- Dünya Her Gün Caz Yapar (The world makes jazz everyday)
- Hey Baksana (Hey let you look)
- Karamel (Caramel)
- Mutsuz Böcek (Sad bug)
- Uzay Kuşu (Space Bird)
