= Hayganuş Mark =

Armenian writer (1884–1966)

- Հայկանուշ Մառք
- Born: Hayganuş Topuzyan; 1884; Constantinople, Ottoman Empire
- Died: 1966 (aged 81–82); Istanbul, Turkey
- Resting place: Şişli Armenian Cemetery, Istanbul
- Occupations: writer, journalist, poet
- Spouse: Vahan Toshigyan
- Writing career
- Language: Armenian
- Subjects: Feminism; Armenian women

Hayganuş Mark (Armenian: Հայկանուշ Մառք; 1884–1966) was an Armenian feminist writer, poet, opinion journalist, prosai and public figure.

== Early life ==
Of Armenian descent, Hayganuş Mark was born in Constantinople in 1884. Her father was Markar Topuzyan, a servant-broker (սպասաւորի միջնորդ) from Van born in 1850 or 1851 (AR 1266), and her mother was Yebrakse, born in Constantinople in 1853 or 1854 (AR 1269). She adopted the family name "Mark", the short form of "Markar," following the enactment of the Surname Law in Turkey in 1934.

She attended the Esayan Elementary and High School. She took Armenian language lessons for five years from linguist Hagop Kurken, whose attention she had attracted during her final grade in the high school. She then served as an assistant teacher at the orphanage of the Yedikule Armenian Hospital for four years.

== Career ==
Her first article was published in Manzûme-i Efkâr, an Armeno-Turkish periodical. Because of this article, she received job offers from periodicals like Pürag, Hanrakidag, Püzantion and Panaser. She was not even twenty years of age when she was awarded second place in a poetry competition organized by the newspaper Masis.

In 1905, Mark started to edit the Constantinople-based women’s Armenian magazine Dzaghig ("Flower"). At that time, those who contributed to the magazine were mostly by men due to the scarcity of women writers. Male writers in the periodical Dzaghig used feminine pen names. Having been aware of the feminist movements in France, she wanted the magazine to be published only by women and for women. In the meantime, she married Vahan Toshigyan, editorial director of the periodical Manzûme-i Efkâr, and quit her job at the orphanage. The periodical continued to be published for another two years, but ended when Mark moved with her husband to Smyrna. There, she wrote on women's issues at local magazines such as Arşaluys ("Dawn") and Arevelk ("Orient").

In 1909, the couple returned to Constantinople. Mark became the head of the Literary Commission of the recently founded "Nationalist Armenian Women's Union". She got ready to open up Armenian schools in the province and to provide education of girls. As a result of these efforts, the number of Armenian schools in Anatolia increased to 32.

In 1919, she started to publish the bi-weekly feminist magazine Hay Gin (Armenian: Հայ Կին, "Armenian Woman"). This time, the difference in her attitude is that not only women but both genders should be involved in the publishing of the periodical. She left her idea of separating men and women. She never gave up independence saying "if the Armenian Woman magazine will live under a flag, this can only be a womanhood flag."

In 1923, Muhittin Üstündağ, a deputy of Istanbul, said in a seminar of the "Turkish Women's Union" that "there is no gender equality because women are not enlisted". While nobody responded to that, Mark sharply criticized it in the daily Hilal-ı Ahmer ("Red Crescent") with the words "mothers lost their lives during childbirth, and women also serve as a nurse on the battlefields".

Her periodical continued to appear 13 years until 1932, when it was closed down by the Turkish government. It is noted that the paper was forced to close down because it was accused of supporting the "enemies of the Turks" for its support of the Allies during the post-World War I years.

== Feminism ==
Mark opposed "women becoming male in the name of emancipation". She said that "women must work and achieve their economic freedom", adding "in doing this, there is no need to be prepared to be rude, to destroy". According to her "love is in the mind". She pointed out that "the education system is prepared from a male perspective", and stated that "involvement of women in the curriculum preparation stage is imperative". Mark said that "men and women are different and equal", adding "women must claim their differences for themselves and for humanity".

== Death ==
Hayganuş Mark died at the age of 81 at Yedikule Armenian Hospital in 1966. At the deathbed, she said to a friend "Write! Always write for the homeland, nation and humanity and be happy with them!".

She is buried at the Şişli Armenian Cemetery in Istanbul. On her headstone, the title of her magazine "Hay Gin" is written.
