= Masis Aram Gözbek =

- Born: Masis Aram Gözbek; 5 November 1987 (age 38)
- Origin: Istanbul, Turkey
- Occupations: Conductor & artistic director, musician, composer
- Instrument: Piano
- Years active: 2004–present
- Website: Masis Aram Gözbek Official Facebook Musician Page

Masis Aram Gözbek (born 5 November 1987) is a Turkish conductor, artistic director, musician and composer.

== Biography ==
Born in 1987 in an Armenian family, he has won several international awards including a World Championship and given numerous performances both in Turkey and abroad with Boğaziçi Jazz Choir.

In 2013, he won Yıldız Technical University 'Rectorship Award' and The Most Successful Young Person award at the Turkey finals of 19th Ten Outstanding Young People. The following year, he won the Young Conductor Special Award in the 35th International May Choir Competition in Varna.

He carries on his orchestral conducting studies with Antonio Pirolli, worked with Sertab Erener, Nil Karaibrahimgil, Yasemin Mori, and Ali Kocatepe and is the founder and the artistic director of Boğaziçi Jazz Choir, Boğaziçi Youth Choir; artistic director of Acappella Grup 34 Choir and Sainte-Pulchérie French High School Choir in Turkey.

== Awards ==
- The first prize – International Istanbul Jazz Festival, Young Jazz Evaluation Concert.
- 'Silver Diploma' both in jazz and pop categories – 8th Vokal Total, held in Graz, Austria in 2008.
- Three golden diplomas from the 6th World Choir Games held in China, between 15 and 26 July 2010
- Boğaziçi jazz Choir – World Choir Championships in Graz, Austria between 10 and 17 July 2011 – 'World Champion' in Contemporary Music and Folklore categories and also got the 'second prize' in Mixed Choirs category. They also competed in the 'Grand Prix of Choral Music' and won two other gold medals, collecting a total of 5 gold medals.
- Boğaziçi Jazz Choir – Ranked as 1st in 'Folklore' and 13th in 'World Rankings' by INTERKULTUR.
- Boğaziçi Jazz Choir – 3 gold medals in the 7th World Choir Games in the US.
- Boğaziçi Jazz Choir – 1 gold medal in the Cantemus International Choir Festival in Hungary.
- Boğaziçi Jazz Choir – May 2014, they won the 'first prize' in the Mixed Choirs category and also Masis Aram Gözbek won the 'Young Conductor Special Award' at the '35th International May Choir Competition' which was held in Bulgaria and is a member of the European Grand Prix.
- Boğaziçi Jazz Choir – in October 2014 attended Polyfollia in France with a special invitation, being one of the 11 invited ensembles and also the first and only group representing Turkey.

Apart from these, with Boğaziçi Jazz Choir;

- 2012 – Vocal Ensemble of the Year – Donizetti Classical Music Awards
- 2012 – The Ensemble of the Year (plebiscite) – Donizetti Classical Music Awards
- 2012 – Achievement of the Year – ROTABEST 2012
- 2012 – The Best Choir of the Year – Uludağ University 8th Media Awards
- 2012 – The Best Choir of the Year – Şişli Rotary Club
- 2012 – The Best Choir of the Year – Darüşşafaka Media Awards
- 2013 – Modern Folk Music Award – Troya Folklore Association
- 2014 – The Most Authentic Musical Group – Halk TV
- 2014 – 'Beyaz Kelebekler' Music Honor Award – Kabataş Alumni Association
- 2014 – Jury's Special Award – 19. Turkey Choir Festival
- 2014 – Intonation, Homogeneity and Choral Sound Award – 19. Turkey Choir Festival
