= Çarşı (supporter group) =

Turkish football supporter group

Group Çarşı
- Founded: 1982
- Type: Supporters' group
- Motto: Çarşı, her şeye karşı! (Çarşı is against everything!)
- Stand: East (formerly named Kapalı)
- Website: www.forzabesiktas.com

Beşiktaş Çarşı Grubu (referred to simply as Çarşı) is the best known supporter group of BJK (Beşiktaş Gymnastics Club, notably including the Beşiktaş football club). At their home ground in Beşiktaş Stadium, Çarşı locate themselves on the curva of Kapalı (Covered Stand) and are known for their social and political commentary, choreography, and genuine manner of chanting.

There are many catch-phrases of the group, "Çarşı, her şeye karşı!" (English: Çarşı is against everything!") being probably the most famous one.

On 28 May 2008, Çarşı disbanded itself unexpectedly. However, on 21 August 2008, the group announced on its internet site that Çarşı and its chants would continue. The group has been active ever since. Some members of Çarşı were involved in the 2013 Turkish protests.

== Definition ==
In Turkey; Beşiktaş, Fenerbahçe and Galatasaray are accepted as the biggest three clubs (Trabzonspor is the fourth occasionally), as they are the most successful ones in Turkish football history, and have the highest number of supporters. There are also numerous supporter groups of many teams, i.e. ultrAslan for Galatasaray, Genç FB for Fenerbahçe, Group Yalı for Göztepe A.Ş. etc. The groups' names are related to a team's name or badge, the symbol of the city, or a specific place inside the city. The name 'Çarşı' is also an example for this situation. Çarşı literally means "Marketplace" in Turkish. In the 1980s, the young people of Beşiktaş district who were supporting Beşiktaş J.K. were usually spending their time around the bazaar, located in the center of the district. They were living, coming together and supporting the team together in that specific place. This lifestyle led them to found the group with the name of Çarşı in 1982.

Although Çarşı is basically accepted as a fan group, Çarşı may be defined better as a common way of acting, including the shared beliefs of the fans; therefore Çarşı is a dignity, or a form of common soul among Beşiktaş fans. According to a well-known fan, Alp Batu Keçeci, Çarşı is described as an abstract notion rather than a basic and solid fan group.

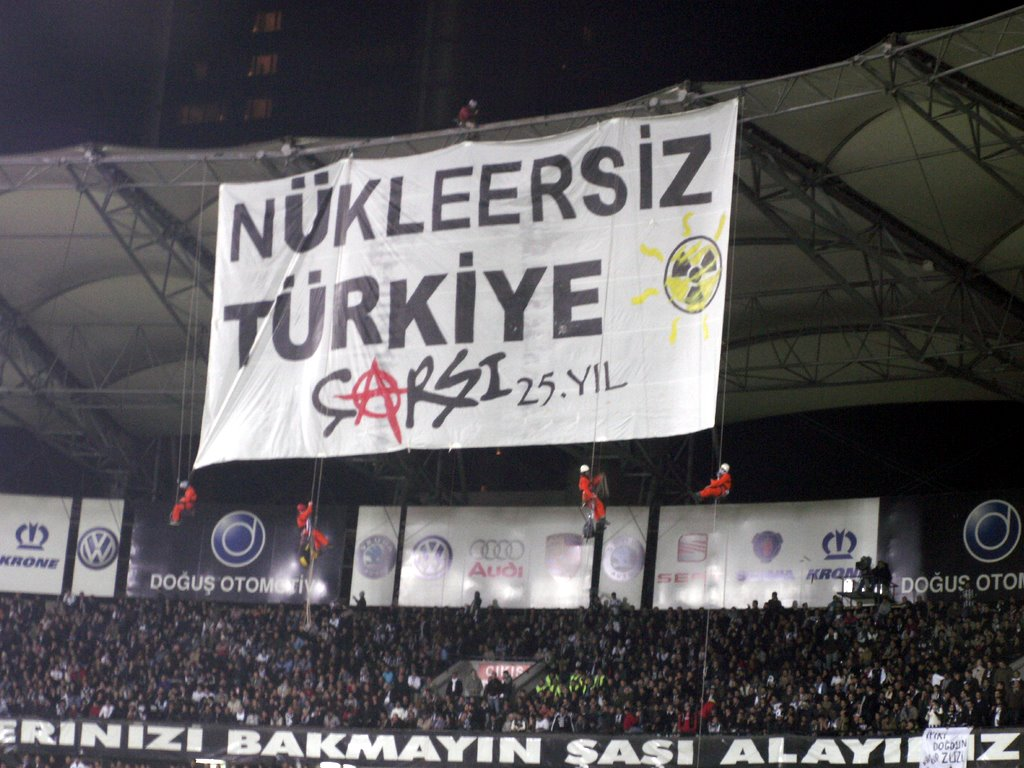
Çarşı and Greenpeace with a huge placard, standing against a possible nuclear power plant establishment in Turkey

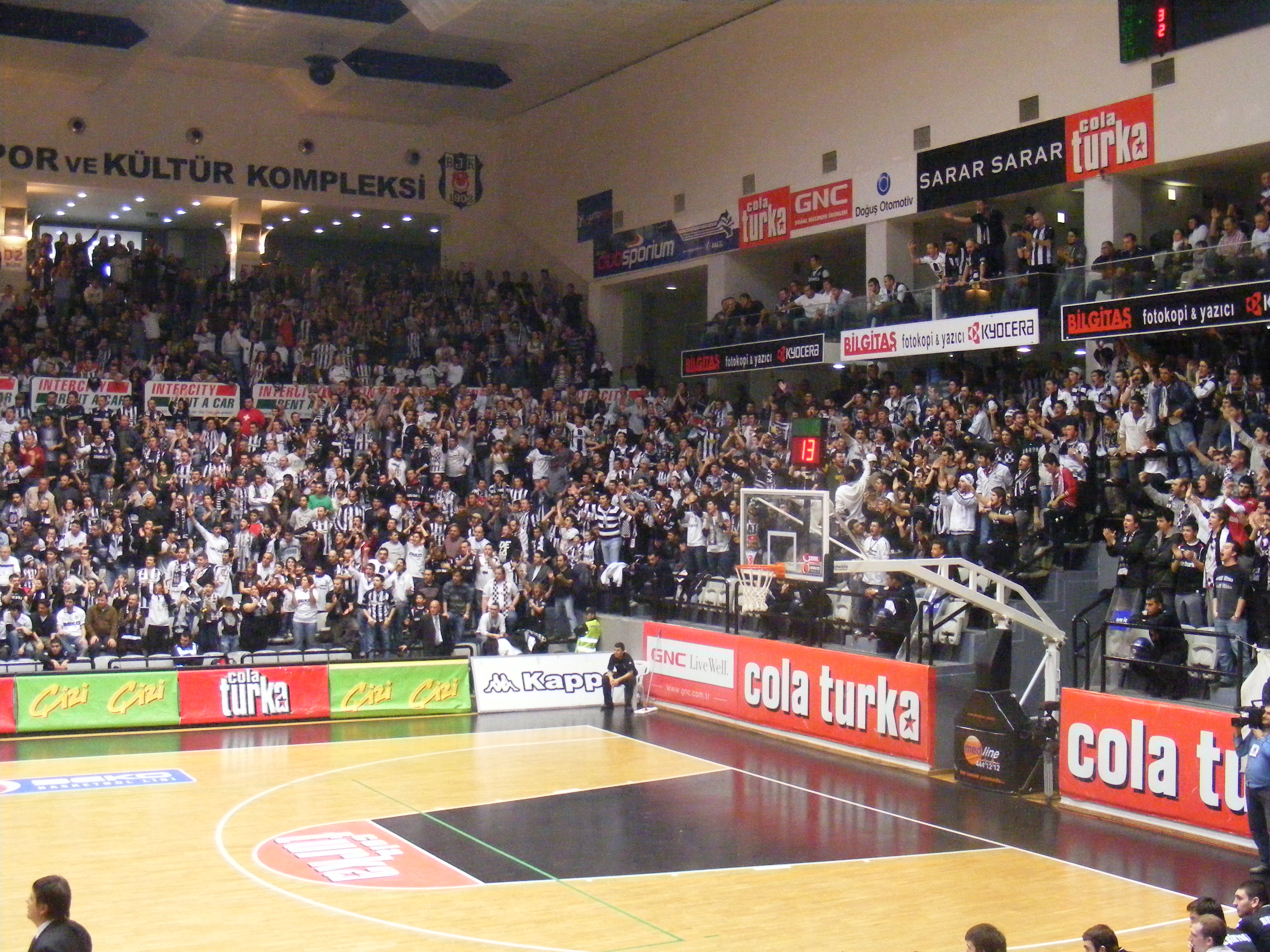
Fans support the team in all the branches

What is Çarşı?

"Çarşı is not only a group lined at Kapalı... ,
Çarşı is everyone who feels the love of Beşiktaş.
Çarşı is a graffiti drawn on a New York Subway train,
a quote written on a wall in Prague,
love written on a hillside in Erzincan,
a black&white painting on the wall of an association in Adana,
a Çarşı Ulan mark on Galatasaray High School wall.
....

— Alp Batu Keçeci.

.

This definition collected positive reactions of the supporters and it was embraced over time. Many of the internet fan forums have given place for this article.

== Characteristics ==
Çarşı separates itself from the other fan groups by its members' attitude during the matches, and with their placards. The group was formed in 1981–82 season and their fame began to spread in the 1990s. Çarşı does not have a homogenous structure and it does not consist of a certain group of people with a specific identity. People from different social backgrounds, cultural environments, and ethnic origins are assembled at the group even though they support opposite ways of thinking in terms of politics or ideologies. An all-around antagonist image and attitude represent the basic characteristics of the group.

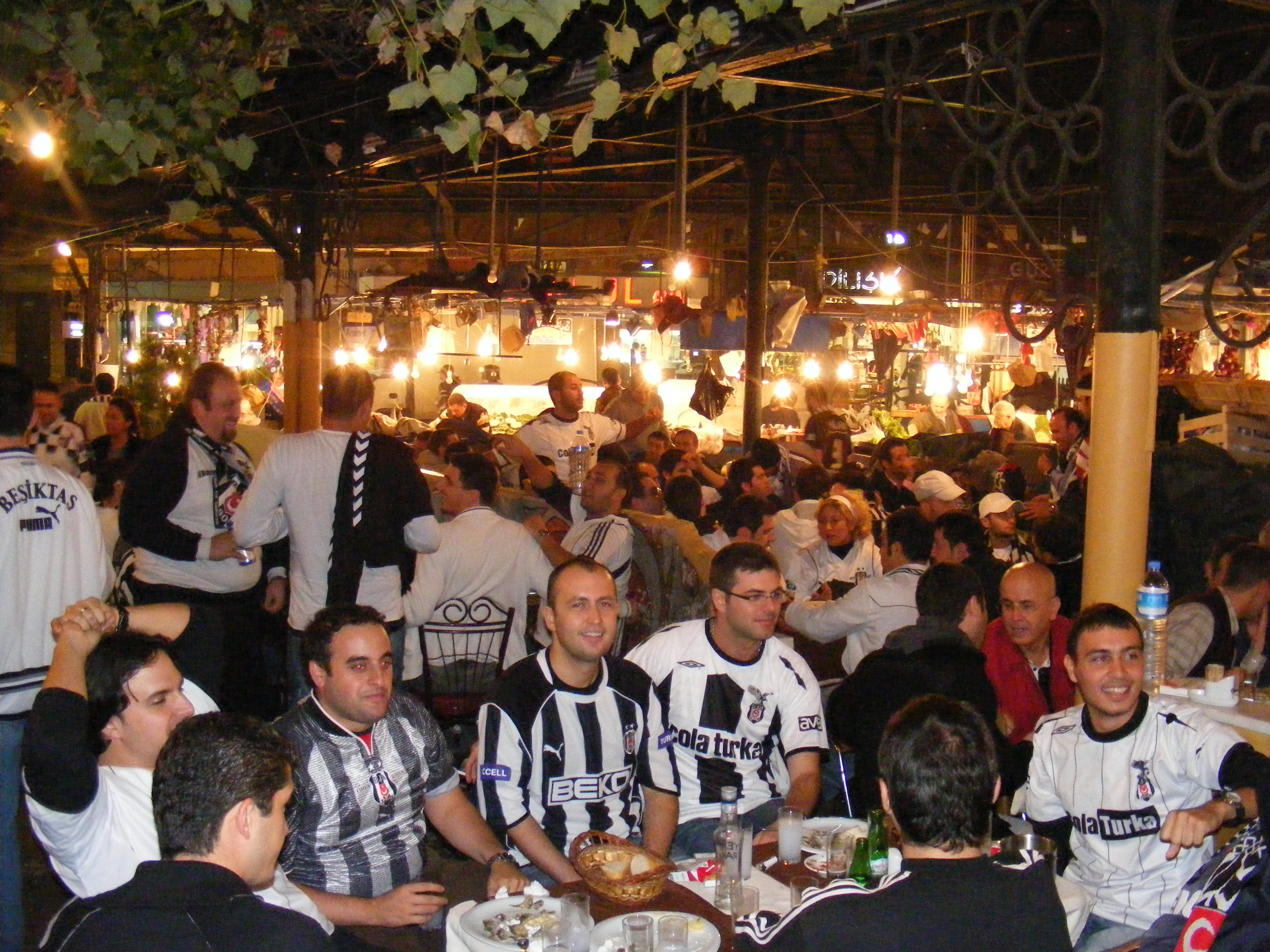
Fans eating at fish restaurants

The name of the group comes from the central market place of Beşiktaş district, which is located in downtown, near the Istanbul Bosphorus. Beşiktaş Çarşı contains many restaurants, bars, a big fish market, and also numerous cosmetics, clothing and technology shops. There fans assemble and pass their time with various activities until the matches. It is possible to see fans on match days, wearing black-and-white jerseys at the fish restaurants and bars. Also, newly produced chants by Beşiktaş fans are usually sung and embraced for the first time in Beşiktaş Çarşı.

After meeting. fans generally walk to the home ground, İnönü Stadium passing Dolmabahçe Palace. They generally prefer to arrive there about 2 or 3 hours before the matches; however, a majority of people do not immediately enter the stadium. They like to hang around the stadium before going in, for different reasons such as meeting their friends, to have some drinks or to chant right before the matches.

In Istanbul, supporters live on both the European and Asian sides of the Bosphorus, and so do Çarşı members. The inhabitants of the Asian side travel to the stadium by both road and sea transportation, but sea transportation is used more frequently. The fans mainly get on the ferries from Kadıköy or Üsküdar districts, where they can arrive at Beşiktaş in approximately 20 minutes. There are both directly related members of group and just normal supporters who want to be a part of action; it is likely to see many university students among the members. Therefore, the group stand out with its quip, witty and humorist aspect. Çarşı generally react the topics and incidents with an unexpected manner.

Çarşı utilize some symbols to express their opinions. One of them is a derivative form of letter A, as it is used in the notion of anarchy. However, Çarşı states that they re-shaped the symbol with extending the low ends of the letter to show the difference. Hence, they use the letter as a symbol of rebellious soul (Turkish: Asi Ruh). This idea was the inspiration for the name of the TV documentary Turkish: Asi Ruh dedicated to the group, which was begun in 2007 (the group's 25th anniversary) and which came out on DVD in 2008.

Some young fans wearing Çarşı concepted goods

The assortment of support is very wide; teenage and elderly fans alike consider themselves members and participate. The fans wear the official team products as well as the products based on Çarşı.

== Defunction and reactions ==
On 28 May 2008, Çarşı concluded its presence by a farewell letter written by Alen Markaryan, arguably the main cheerleader (Turkish: Amigo). During the Press Gala of Turkish: Asi Ruh documentary, Markaryan declared that they decided to disband the group after discussions which questioned the group's position as coming before Beşiktaş J.K. itself for the supporters. According to the newspapers, some subsequent reactions came up even in the gala.

== Re-establishment ==
On 21 August 2008, Çarşı announced on its own internet website that the group had come back. The group also stated that why it had decided to take a break and disbanded itself for four reasons. These reasons were:

- The claim that the Çarşı brand had overtaken Beşiktaş,
- Allegations made against Çarşı and its founders,
- Disruption of the unity and integrity of the Beşiktaş community,
- Attributing responsibility for some judicial incidents to the group

The group also claimed that supporters' groups of Anatolian teams, had a hostility targeting Çarşı. Adding on, the group stated that it will not make such decision to leave the stands again because "they want to be at the disposal of the Beşiktaş community with their goodwill" to protect the clubs unity and integrity.

== 2013 Turkey protests ==
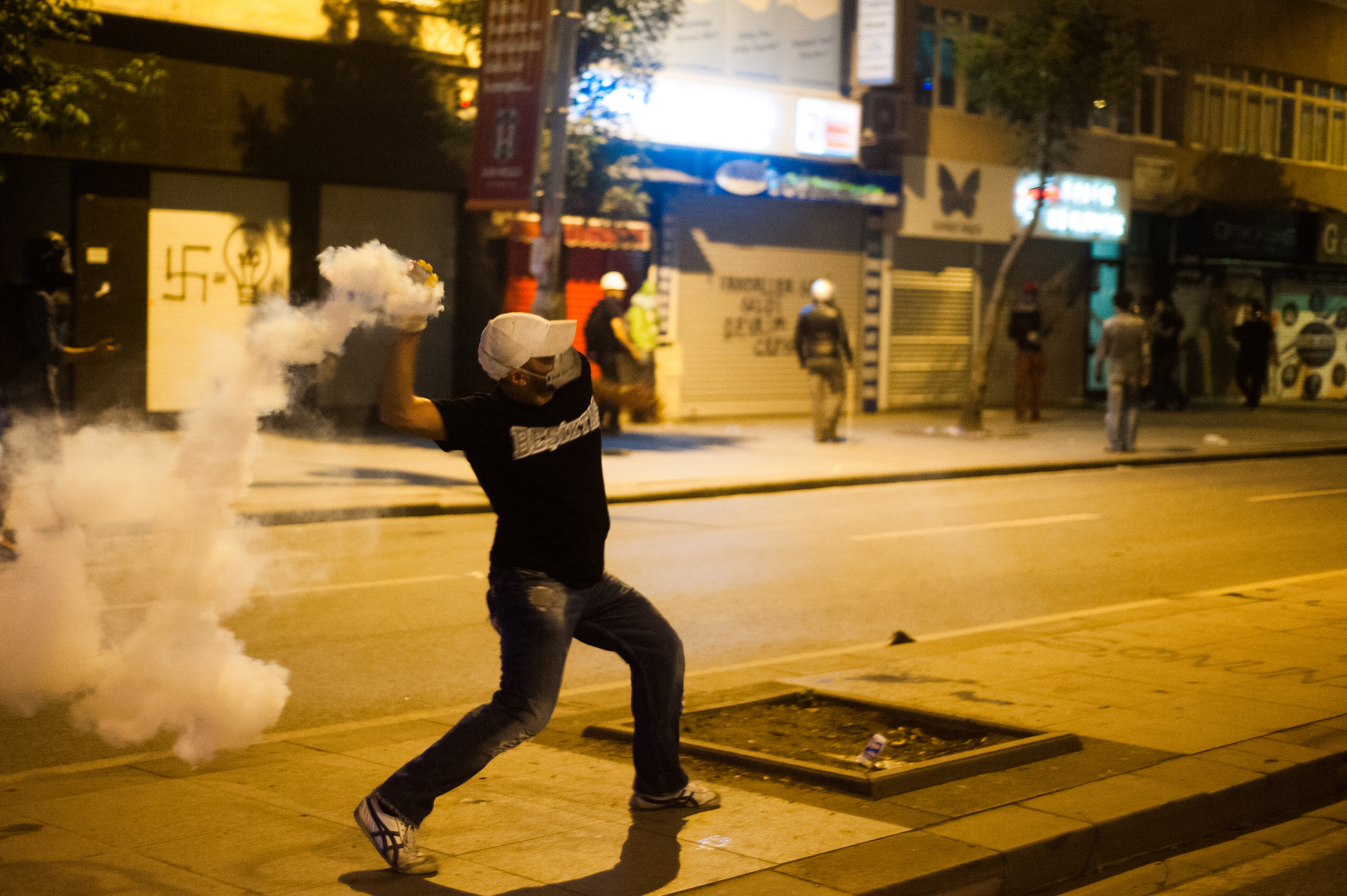
Çarşı member throwing tear gas cartridge back at police

Some members of Çarşı were involved in the 2013 protests in Turkey, attacking the police with a stolen excavator.

== Bibliography ==
Books

- Dikici, Sema (2009). Çarşı: Başka Bir Taraftarlık (in Turkish). Turkey: Dipnot Yayınları. ISBN 978-975-080-456-4.
- Dikici, Sema (2015). Futbol 3 F (in Turkish). Turkey: Sinemis. ISBN 978-605-4566-34-1.
- Kana, Ersin (2008). Asi Ruh (in Turkish). Turkey: New Age Yayınları. ISBN 9789756131015.
