= Hagop Vahram Çerçiyan =

Turkish-Armenian educator

Hagop Vahram Çerçiyan (Armenian: Հակոբ Վահրամ Չերչիյան) was a 20th-century Ottoman-born Turkish-Armenian professor of mathematics, geography, and calligraphy at the Robert College of Istanbul.

== Life ==
Of Armenian descent, Hagop Vahram Çerçiyan was an educator. He travelled to the United States to study the Palmer Method, which by that time had gained widespread popularity. Çerçiyan was known for teaching this method during his career as a professor. He returned to Istanbul and became a professor of mathematics, geography, and calligraphy at the Robert College in Istanbul. Over his 55-year career at the Robert College, Çerçiyan taught over 25,000 students, among them the future Prime Minister Bülent Ecevit, Foreign Ministers Selim Sarper and Rıfat Turgut Menemencioğlu, ambassadors Talat Halman and Nurver Nures and Cabinet Minister Kasım Gülek.

=== Atatürk's signature ===
The signature that Hagop Çerçiyan claims to have designed and was chosen by Mustafa Kemal Atatürk.

During the initial years of the Turkish Republic and under the reforms of Atatürk, a Latin-based alphabet was introduced to replace the Perso-Arabic script then in use. As part of the reforms, Turkish citizens were also required to take up a last name under the Surname Law in 1934. Prior to this, Turkey's Christian and Jewish citizens were already using surnames, but Muslims did not use surnames. Muslims were generally referred by their social or professional titles such as "Pasha", "Hoca", "Bey", "Hanım", "Efendi", or their names were complemented with that of their father. Mustafa Kemal himself was required to take up a surname, and the Turkish Parliament gave him the surname Atatürk, meaning father of the Turks. Many members of parliament, including some of Çerçiyan's former students, suggested that Atatürk needed a new signature for his name. On a November morning in 1934, members of parliament presented the proposal to Çerçiyan, who accepted the task. That night, five model signatures were prepared and the following morning, police officers arrived to collect them. Çerçiyan claimed that Atatürk personally selected the one of "K. Atatürk" from these five model signatures. Historian Cengiz Özakıncı refuted this claim and stated that Atatürk's signature was formed by writing his name and surname in his own handwriting, and that Vahram Çerçiyan only engraved Atatürk's signature on the Nutuk book, which was published in 1934, in order to make a cliché with china ink in the printing house, and that years later he came out with the claim that "I designed the signature".

== Legacy ==
According to Hagop Çerçiyan's son Dikran Çerçiyan, after the death of Atatürk in 1938, his father's contribution to Atatürk's signature risked being forgotten: "Some tried to introduce others as the creator of the signature. There were efforts to forget my father. But the truth always come[s] to the surface".

== See also ==
- Agop Dilâçar
