= Stepan Papelyan =

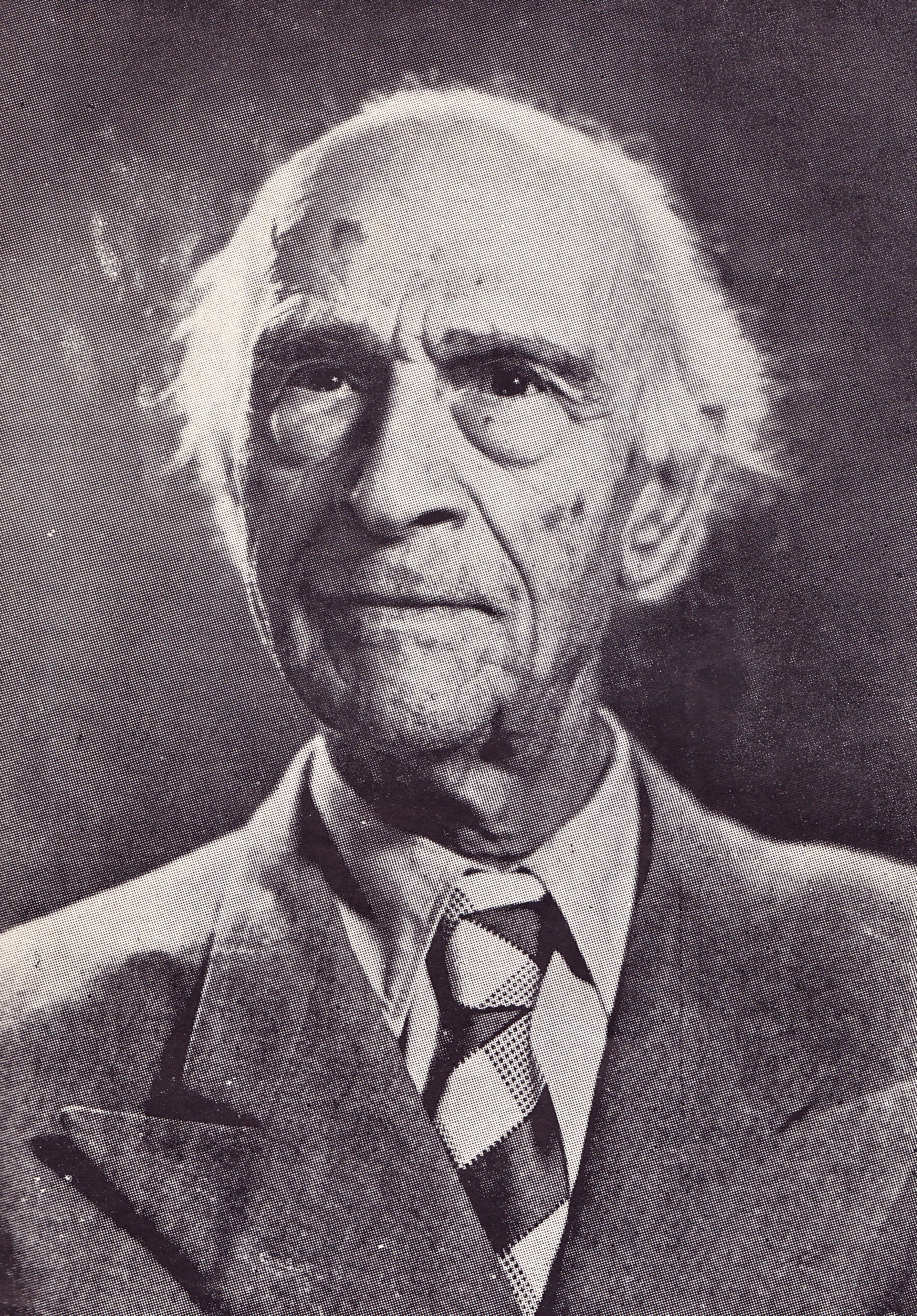
- Stepan Papelyan c. 1950s

Background information
- Born: Constantinople
- Died: Istanbul
- Genres: Classical music
- Occupations: Pedagogue, Composer, Writer
- Instrument: Piano

Stepan Papelyan (Armenian: Ստեփան Բաբելեան; 1875 – 12 November 1960) was an Armenian pedagogue, composer, and writer.

== Biography ==
Papelyan was born in the Scutari district of Constantinople (Note: Now Üsküdar, Istanbul) in the Ottoman Empire. He attended the Berberian School and displayed an interest in music from an early age. There he studied the piano with Avedis Horasandjian and later with composer Haroutioun Sinanian.

However, his real calling was teaching. Papelyan developed the principles of his teaching method by examining various treatises on educational philosophy, by learning from experience and by reflecting on the act of performance itself. He was the first teacher to organise student recitals in Istanbul, which proved to be a huge success both for the students and their parents. Following the concerts Papelyan would also write a critique of each student’s progress and accordingly move him or her to an appropriate class.

After the Great Fire of Üsküdar in 1921, when the Papelyan household was destroyed, Stepan first moved to the neighboring district of Kadıköy, and then to Pera (now Beyoğlu), where he continued his musical activities.

He wrote numerous articles in the Armenian media about literature, art, philosophy and events of the time. He was particularly gifted in explaining difficult subjects in simple and understandable terms. His analysis of Beethoven’s Ninth Symphony is of particular interest.

Stepan Papelyan died in Istanbul in 1960 and is buried in the Şişli Armenian Cemetery.

== Compositions ==
=== Piano ===
- Vers le passé
- La fin d’un rêve
- Clair de lune
- Nostalgie
- Polka
- Mazurka
