= Sirvart Kalpakyan Karamanuk =

Sirvart Karamanuk

Background information
- Born: Sirvart Karamanuk; 1 December 1912; Üsküdar, Istanbul, Ottoman Empire
- Died: 20 October 2008 (aged 95) Zeytinburnu, Istanbul, Turkey
- Genre: Classical music
- Occupations: Composer, pianist
- Years active: 1918 - 2000
- Spouse: Kevork Karamanuk

Sirvart Kalpakyan Karamanuk (Armenian: Սիրվարդ Գալբագեան Գարամանուկ; 1 December 1912 – 20 October 2008) was an Armenian composer, pianist and teacher, living in Istanbul.

== Early life ==
Karamanuk was born in the Üsküdar district of Constantinople, Ottoman Empire. She began studying the piano at the age of five with Stepan Papelyan, and later graduated from the Istanbul Municipal Conservatory (now Istanbul University State Conservatory) in 1939, where her principal teacher was Ferdi Statzer. She also took classes with Cemal Reşit Rey, Ahmet Adnan Saygun and Licco Amar in music theory, history and chamber music. Subsequently, Karamanuk took private lessons in piano with Lazare Lévy and composition with Jean Roger-Ducasse for a short period.

== Career ==
Karamanuk composed numerous songs, choral works, large-scale compositions for chorus and orchestra (Akhtamar and The Song of Bedros Tourian), a children’s operetta (Tomorrow’s Artists), children's songs, piano compositions, and arrangements of liturgical chants. Her works have been performed in several countries and recorded by distinguished soloists and ensembles. Concerts devoted entirely to her compositions have been organised in Yerevan's Aram Khachaturian House-Museum and Aram Khachaturian Concert Hall. In 2004, a film titled Akhtamar based on Karamanuk's eponymous symphonic poem was premiered in Yerevan's Moscow Cinema. Her compositions are published by the Armenian General Benevolent Union of America, the Turkish-Armenian Teachers Association of Istanbul and the Charents Museum of Literature and Arts of Armenia, where her manuscripts are reposited.

== Honors ==
She was honored with a pontifical encyclical and the St. Sahag-St. Mesrob Medal from the Catholicos of All Armenians, Vazgen I; a pontifical encyclical and the St. Mesrob Mashtots Medal from the Catholicos of the Holy See of Cilicia, Aram I. She also received a pastoral letter and a celebrative medal by Patriarch Mesrob II Mutafyan of Constantinople. In 2005 Robert Kocharyan, former President of Armenia, issued a proclamation of gratitude to Sirvart Karamanuk, for her enduring contributions to Armenian culture.

== Compositions ==
=== Vocal-orchestral ===
- Ախթամար • Akhtamar • 1969
- Գարնան առաւօտ • Karnan aravod • 1969
- Երգ Պետրոս Դուրեանի • Yerk Bedros Turyani • 1972

=== Vocal (solo) ===
- Տէ՛ր, ես քեզմէ ուզեցի • Der, yes kezme uzetsi • 1946
- Եարճան • Yar, jan • 1946
- Ի՞նչ կ՚ըսեն • Inch gısen? 1951
- Նէ • Ne • 1952
- Սիրերգ • Sirerk • 1953
- Այնքան շատ • Aynkan shad • 1954
- Սիրտ ունենք, սէր չունենք •Sird unenk, ser chunenk • 1954
- Հոգիս • Hokis • 1954
- Երեք կոչերը • Yerek gocherı • 1954
- Ինչ անեմ որ հաւատաս • Inch anem vor havadas • 1955
- Նամակ • Namag • 1957
- Օրօրոցի մօտ • Ororotsi mod • 1957
- Սիրտը • Sirdı • 1957
- Ես որ մեռնեմ • Yes vor mernem • 1958
- Անանուն • Ananun • 1958
- Սիրերգ • Sirerk • 1958
- Սէր • Ser • 1958
- Հունձք կը ժողուեմ • Huntsk gı joghvem • 1959
- Մի՛ մերձենար յիս • Mi mertsenar his • 1960
- Կոյսը • Guysı • 1961
- Ողջակէզ • Voghchagez • 1961
- Սուրբ Աստուած ճրագալոյցի • Surp Asdvadz Jrakaluytsi • 1961
- Սաղմոս • Saghmos • 1963
- Օրօր • Oror • 1965
- Երջանկութիւն • Yerchangutyun • 1970
- Սպասում • Sbasum • 1970
- Սէր անայլայլ • Ser anaylayl • 1970
- Բանաստեղծութիւն • Panasdeghdzutyun
- Ներբող Պետրոս Դուրեանի • Nerpogh Bedros Turyani • 1972
- Երկնէր երկին և երկիր • Yergner yergin yev yergir • 1973
- Կոյսի հոգին • Guysi hokin • 1973
- Ի կոյսն Հռիփսիմէ • I guysn Hripsime • 1973
- Եկէսցէ • Yegestse • 1974
- Ես որ մեռնեմ • Yes vor mernem • 1975
- Վերջալոյսին դէմ • Verchaluysin tem • 1975
- Աշնանային • Ashnanayin • 1975
- Եթէ • Yete • 1975
- Անտուն գիշերներ • Andun kisherner • 1975
- Սիրտս երկինք է • Sirds yergink e • 1975
- Օտա՜ր, ամայի՜ • Odar, amayi • 1975
- Կ՚ուզես լինեմ վշտի ցօղեր • Guzes linem vshdi tsogher
- Փափաք • Papak
- Ես սիրեցի • Yes siretsi
- Մայիսեան վարդեր • Mayisyan varter
- Բարի երկինք (երգաշար) • Pari yergink
- Սիրել վերջին շունչով • Sirel verchin shunchov
- Ինչ աղուոր է • Inch aghvor e
- Գարուն • Karun
- Գարունն եմ ես • Karun n'em es
- Երեսդ վառի • Yerest vari
- Օրէ օր • Ore or
- Իրիկունը վերջին • Irigunı verchin
- Ամէն գիշեր • Amen kisher
- Խօսք առ բանաստեղծութիւն • Kosk ar panasdeghdzutyun
- Մայրամուտ • Mayramud
- Հեգնանք • Heknank
- Սուրբին աղօթքը • Surpin aghotkı
- Անգամ մը միայն • Ankam mı miayn
- Մայր • Mayr
- Սուտ կամ իրաւ • Sud gam irav
- Մի՛ դպիք • Mi tbik
- Վերյիշում • Verhishum
- Կապոյտ ու դալար • Gabuys u talar
- Սպասում • Sbasum
- Խաղը կեանքի • Khaghı gyanki
- Սկսիլ • Sgsil
- Քառասմբակ սէրերով • Karasmpag sererov
- Գայլին մահը • Kaylin mahı
- Հայաստան ասելիս • Hayasdan aselis
- Վոգալիզ • Vokaliz
- Երազներ իմ կորած • Yerazner im goradz

=== Vocal (duet) ===
- Կոյսի հոգի • Guysi hoki (The soul of the virgin)
- Հովուերգութիւն • Hovverkutyun
- Խարխափում • Kharkhapum
- Առաւօտ • Aravod (Morning)

=== Choral (secular) ===
- Պագնեմ զքո լայն ճակատ • Baknem zko layn jagad • (Let Me Kiss Your Clear Forehead), 1956
- Գարուն-Պարերգ • Karun/Barerk
- Հունձք կը ժողվեմ • Huntsk gı zhoghvem • (Harvesting), 1961
- Անի • Ani • (Ani)
- Դժար տարի • Tzhar dari • (Hard Year), 1969
- Ճան իմ յա՜ր • Jan im yar
- Սի՛րտս երկինք է • Sirds yergink e • (My Heart Wide as the Sky), 1975
- Բինկէօլ • Bingoel • (Bingöl), 1975
- Արեւի պէս սիրուն • Arevi bes sirun
- Ծամերդ հուսել • Dzamert husel
- Ճան իմ եար • Jan im yar
- Արամ Խաչատրեան • Aram Khachadryan
- Մի՛ երկնչիր, հօտ փոքրիկ • Mi yergnchir hod pokrig • (Do Not Fear, Little Flock), 1989
- Սիրոյ աղջիկ • Siro aghchig
- Սուրբ Գեղարդ • Surp Keghart • (Holy Geghard), 1993
- Երեսդ վառի • Yerest vari • 1997
- Սուրբ Մեսրոպ • Surp Mesrob • 2003

=== Choral (sacred) ===
- Սուրբ Աստուած • Surp Asdvadz • (Holy Lord)
- Ճաշու շարական (ԱՁ, ԲՁ, ԳՁ, ԴՁ, ԱԿ, ԲԿ, ԳԿ, ԴԿ) • Jashu sharagan • (Eight Synaxis Hymns), 1968
- Ի Սբ. կոյսն Հռիփսիմէ • I Surp guysn Hripsime • (To Virgin Holy Rhipsime), 1973

=== Choral (occasional pieces) ===
- Էսաեանի քայլերգ • Esayani kaylerk
- Գարակէօզեանի քայլերգ • Karagoezyani kaylerk
- Կոմիտասի քայլերգ • Gomidasi kaylerk
- Է.Ս.Մ. 25-ամեակի քայլերգ • Esayan sanuts miutyan 25-amyagi kaylerk •
- Դպրեվանքի քայլերգ • Tbrevanki kaylerk • 1987
- Ձօն՝ Դպրոցասէրցի մանուկներուն • Tson Tbrotsasertsi manugnerun • 1994
- Վիէննայի քայլերգ • Viennayi kaylerk • 1995
- Զուարթնոցի քայլերգ • Zvartnotsi kaylerk • 1996
- Թարգմանչաց վարժարանի քայլերգ • Tarkmanchats varzharani kaylerk • 2006
- Ձօներգ՝ Հայկ և Անժէլ Արսլանեաններուն • Tsonerk Hayg yev Anzhel Arslanyannerun • 2007
- Ազգային հիւանդանոցի քայլերգ • Azkayin hivantanotsi kaylerk • 2007
- Սուրբ Յակոբ հիւանդանոցի քայլերգ • Surp Hagop hivantanotsi kaylerk • 2008

=== Children's operetta ===
- Վաղուան արուեստագէտները • Vaghvan arvesdakednerı • (Tomorrow's Artists), 1949

=== Children's songs ===
- 88 songs for children (1988-1992)
- Արթիւրին երգը (Մկնիկ) • Arthur's song (Mgnig) • 2002, 2006

=== Instrumental ===
- Petite suite en do, pn, 1940
- Largo maestoso, pn, 1940
- La Tonkinoise, pn, 1941
- Histoire bizarre, pn, 1941
- Pastorale, pn, 1942
- Trois mignons, pn, 1942
- Երիտասարդութիւն, հասունութիւն, ծերութիւն (Youth, Maturity, Old Age), pn, 1943
- Admiration, pn, 1944
- Caprice orientale, pn, 1945
- Պարերգ (Dance-song), pn, 1946
- Կոյսի հոգի • Guysi hoki, st.qrt, 1973

== Sources ==
Sirvart Karamanuk's Armeniapedia entry
