= UltrAslan =

Supporters' group of Galatasaray S.K.

ultrAslan
- Abbreviation: uA
- Established: 20 January 2001
- Type: Supporters' group Ultras
- Team: Galatasaray S.K.
- Motto: Bağımsız Taraftar Oluşumu (Independent Supporters Group)
- Location: Istanbul, Turkey
- Stadium: Rams Park
- Stand: North
- Leader: Sebahattin Şirin
- Colours: Yellow Red
- Website: ultraslan.com

ultrAslan is the main supporters' group of Turkish sports club Galatasaray S.K. Founded in 2001, the group is known for their loud support, tifos, and frequent use of flares.

== History ==
The group was founded by Alpaslan Dikmen and around 60 others on 20 January 2001, following Galatasaray's success in the 1999–2000 UEFA Cup and 2000 UEFA Super Cup. Various smaller groups of Galatasaray fans had decided that the team needed a large, organised fan group, which eventually led to the establishment of ultrAslan. The founders held their first meeting at the InterContinental hotel in Taksim Square, where they exchanged ideas about the group's development.

ultrAslan displayed its first major tifo on 14 February 2001, during a UEFA Champions League match against Deportivo La Coruña at Ali Sami Yen Stadium. A banner reading "Only You" was displayed in the stands, in reference to Valentine's Day and the fans' devotion for the club. Throughout the 2000s, ultrAslan continued its support for the club through chants, crowded away stands, and visual displays, which were particularly prominent during fixtures against Turkish rivals and in European competitions.

Dikmen served as the general coordinator of ultrAslan until his accidental death in a traffic collision on 27 September 2008. Following his death, Ahmet Aytaç assumed the role of general coordinator before being succeeded by Oğuz Altay, who resigned from the role in 2013. It is unclear who, if anyone, has held the position since.

Sebahattin Şirin has served as the tribune leader (Turkish: tribün lideri) of ultrAslan since at least 2007. His responsibilities primarily involve coordinating supporters in the stands and representing the group publicly, including on social media.

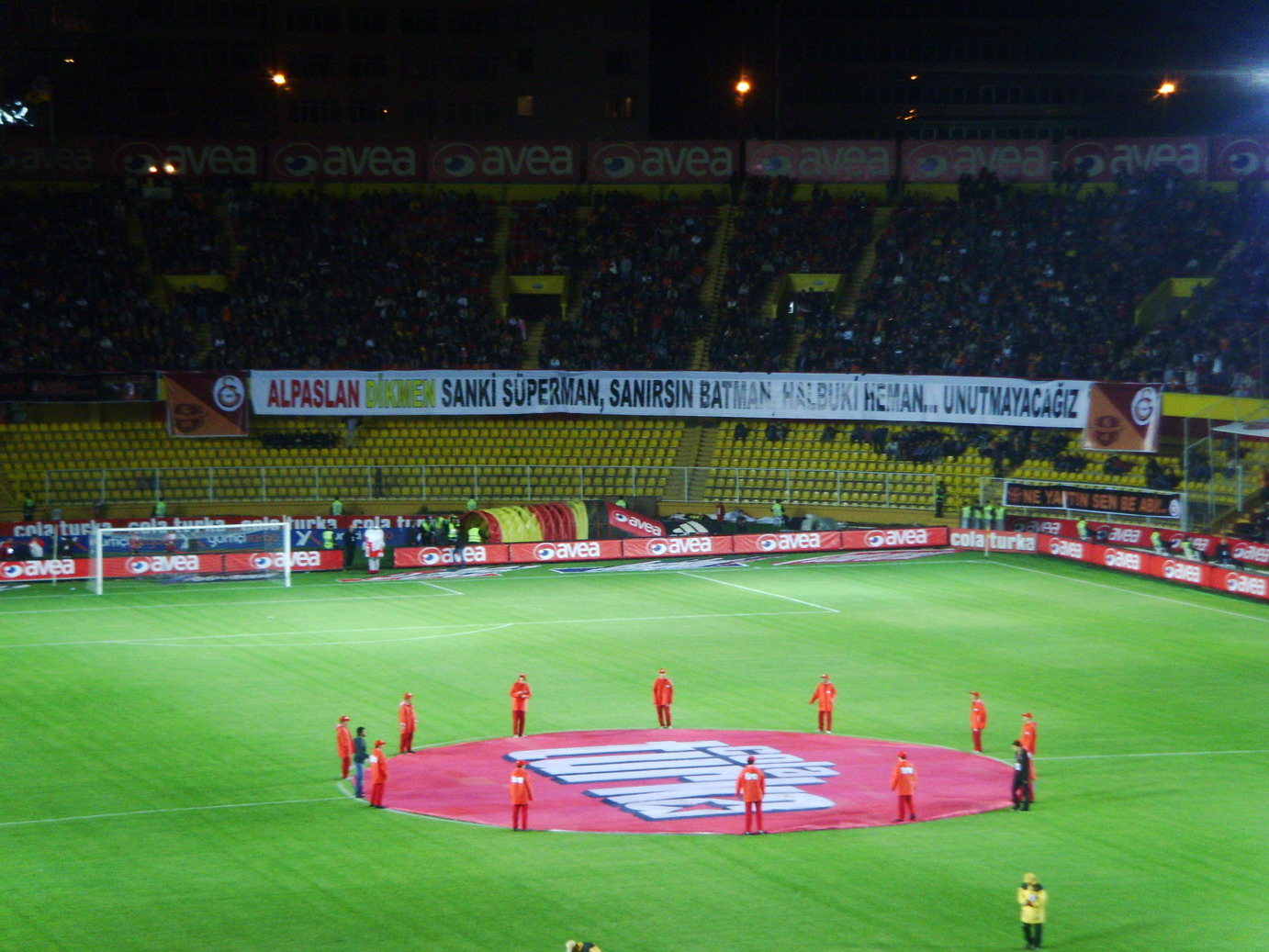
Banner unfurled by ultrAslan following Dikmen's death in 2008.

In recent years, ultrAslan has attracted attention on social media through large scale choreographies at Rams Park. Notable examples include a 2023 match against Manchester United, when a stadium-wide tifo displayed the phrase "Welcome to Hell". Ahead of a 2026 match against Liverpool, ultrAslan unfurled a banner depicting Galatasaray player Victor Osimhen and his late mother, with the phrase "We are family and family is everything" written beneath the artwork.

On 10 August 2026, ultrAslan leader Şirin was taken into custody on charges of publicly disseminating misleading information, possession of narcotics, organised black-market ticket fraud. On 11 August, whilst undergoing a medical examination under police supervision, he chanted slogans in support of PKK founder Abdullah Öcalan both upon entering and leaving the facility. Following this incident, more than 40 sub-groups protested against Şirin, announcing that they would leave ultrAslan and continue independently. As of 14 August, ultrAslan groups, notably ultrAslan UNI, ultrAslan Yurtiçi, ultrAslan Lise and ultrAslan Avrupa suspended the activities of all their provincial and district branches.

== Name ==
The name "ultrAslan" is a portmanteau of the words "ultras" and "aslan", the latter being the Turkish word for lion, a symbol of Galatasaray.

ultrAslan is commonly abbreviated as "uA".
