= Alen Markaryan =

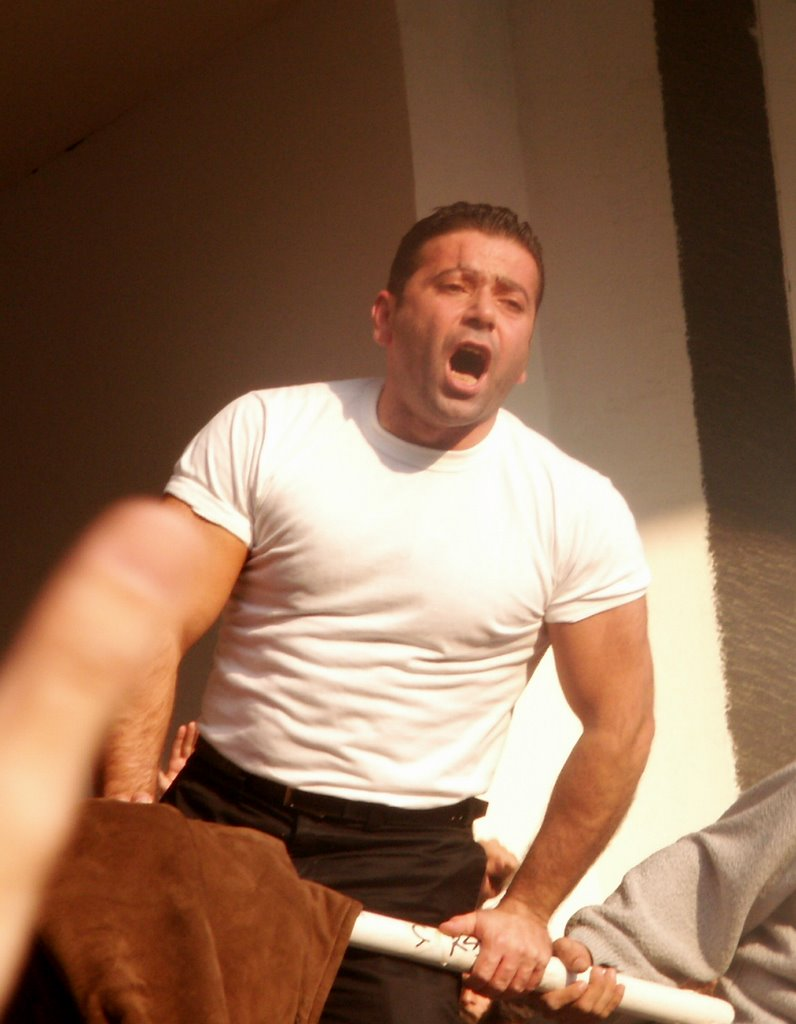
- Markaryan in 2005
- Born: June 30, 1966 (age 59); Istanbul, Turkey
- Occupations: Entrepreneur, writer, columnist
- Known for: Çarşı

Alen Markaryan (born 30 June 1966) is a Turkish business entrepreneur, writer, sports columnist and activist. He is colloquially known of being a notable figure of Çarşı, supporters initiative of Beşiktaş J.K.

== Life ==
Markaryan was born on 30 June 1966 in Istanbul. He is of Armenian descent. He can understand Armenian language, however he cannot speak it. He runs a kebap restaurant named "Aleni Kebap" located in Pangaltı, Istanbul.

Markaryan has regularly attended Beşiktaş games since he was 12 years old. He orchestrates pre-game choreographies of football games.

Markaryan worked at Turkish daily sports newspaper "Fotomaç" and Akşam as sports columnist.

== Books ==
Year	Original Title	Publishing House	ISBN Code
2010	Quaresma	Çizmeli Kedi	ISBN 9786055671907
2019	Alen-i	Hypatia	ISBN 9786050317046
