= Lerna Ekmekçioğlu =

Turkish-Armenian historian (born 1979)

Lerna Ekmekçioğlu is a historian and author of Turkish–Armenian origin. She is a faculty member at MIT. She works on the history of Armenians and Turks in the 20th century.

== Works ==
- Ekmekçioğlu, Lerna (2006). Bir adalet feryadı: Osmanlı'dan Türkiye'ye beş Ermeni feminist yazar, 1862-1933 (in Turkish). Aras Yayıncılık. ISBN 978-975-7265-84-9.
- Ekmekçioğlu, Lerna (2010). Improvising Turkishness: Being Armenian in Post-Ottoman Istanbul (1918-1933) (PhD thesis). New York University.
- Ekmekcioglu, Lerna (2013). "A Climate for Abduction, a Climate for Redemption: The Politics of Inclusion during and after the Armenian Genocide". Comparative Studies in Society and History. 55 (3): 522–553. doi:10.1017/S0010417513000236. hdl:1721.1/88911. S2CID 145218244.
- Ekmekçioğlu, Lerna (2016). Recovering Armenia: The Limits of Belonging in Post-Genocide Turkey. Stanford University Press. ISBN 978-0-8047-9706-1.
