= Jak Ihmalyan =

Painter, political activist, poet and professor of Armenian origin

Jak Ihmalyan (Armenian: Ժակ Իխմալյան; July 30, 1922 – April, 1978) was a painter, political activist, poet and professor of Armenian origin.

== Solo exhibitions ==
- 2013 Sismanoglio Megaro, Istanbul
- 1993 Gallery MD, Istanbul
- 1991 Gallery Cochin Marie-Teresa, Paris
- 1985 Gallery İstasyon Sanat Evi, Istanbul
- 1982 Etchmiadzin Cathedral Museum, Vagharshapat
- 1980 Ankara
- 1980 Baku, Tbilisi, Yerevan
- 1979 Moscow
- 1979 Ankara
- 1978 Tartu
- 1973 Institute of Astronomy, Moscow
- 1972 House of Culture of the Institute of Asia and Africa, Moscow
- 1971 Vilnius
- 1968 Central House of Creative Workers, Moscow
