= Harutyun Hanesyan =

Turkish musician

Harutyun Hanesyan (Armenian: Յարութիւն Հանէսեան; December 30, 1911 – March 7, 1987) was a Turkish violist and composer. He was Armenian by ethnicity.

== Biography ==
Hanesyan was born on December 30, 1911, in Istanbul in the Ottoman Empire. He attended Esayan Lyceum and then Robert College. He graduated in 1931.

Alongside his academic pursuits, Hanesyan took lessons in violin and theory from composer Haroutioun Sinanian. At the invitation of the local YMCA, he and his sister, pianist Anahid Hanesyan, presented a joint recital on May 29, 1932, launching a career in music.

In 1944, Hanesyan joined the local symphony formed under the direction of composer Cemal Reşit Rey and remained with the ensemble until his retirement in 1972. During his tenure with the orchestra, he had many opportunities to play chamber music with Edgar Manas, Ekrem Zeki Ün, Lico Amar, Ferdi Statzer and Hüseyin Sadeddin Arel. Many of the public concerts were recorded and later broadcast on the Istanbul Municipal Radio Station.

Following his retirement from the orchestra, Hanesyan established his own chamber orchestra in 1973 and performed many of his compositions in Istanbul and elsewhere. He recorded an LP, featuring some of his instrumental music and vocal compositions sung by soprano Alis Manukyan.

Hanesyan composed some 50 works, most of them published in Istanbul, and some in Paris by Max Eschig. His musical vocabulary is plain, often tonal and centered. The pulse of his music is reminiscent of folk rhythms. They are mostly instrumental—a number of them for viola, the composer's chosen instrument. The German-Armenian conductor Rolf Agop championed Hanesyan's works and programmed them in various German cities.

Harutyun Hanesyan died on March 7, 1987. He is buried in the Şişli Armenian Cemetery.

== Compositions ==
=== Orchestra ===
- Rapsodie for violin and string orchestra
- Rapsodie for oboe and string orchestra
- Romance for cello and string orchestra
- Bagatelle No. 1 for chamber orchestra
- Bagatelle No. 2 for flute and string orchestra
- Prelude for chamber orchestra
- Scene de ballet (Scene from a Ballet) for chamber orchestra
- Divertimento for string orchestra

=== Chamber music ===
- Berceuse (Lullaby) for violin and piano
- Nocturne for viola (or cello) and piano
- Menuetto for viola (or cello) and piano
- Élégie for viola (or cello) and piano
- Fantaisie concertante for viola and piano
- Andantino for viola (or violin) and piano (1960)
- Pastoral et rondo for viola and piano (1960)
- Prélude et Caprice for viola and piano (1960)
- Romance for viola and piano (1962)
- Duo-sérénade for violin and viola
- Cadenzas for viola concerti by Handel, Telemann, Dittersdorf, Hoffmeister, Stamitz and Zelter

=== Piano ===
- Fête (Festival)
- Հինկալա (Armenian Folk Song)
- Larghetto et allegro vivo
- Menuet en sol
- Vision
- Burlesque

=== Vocal ===
- Ղաբամա (Pumpkin Festival)
- Կուժն առա (I took the Jug)
- Գնա, գնա (Come, Come)
- Berceuse (Lullaby)
