= Agop Dilâçar =

Turkish linguist of Armenian origin

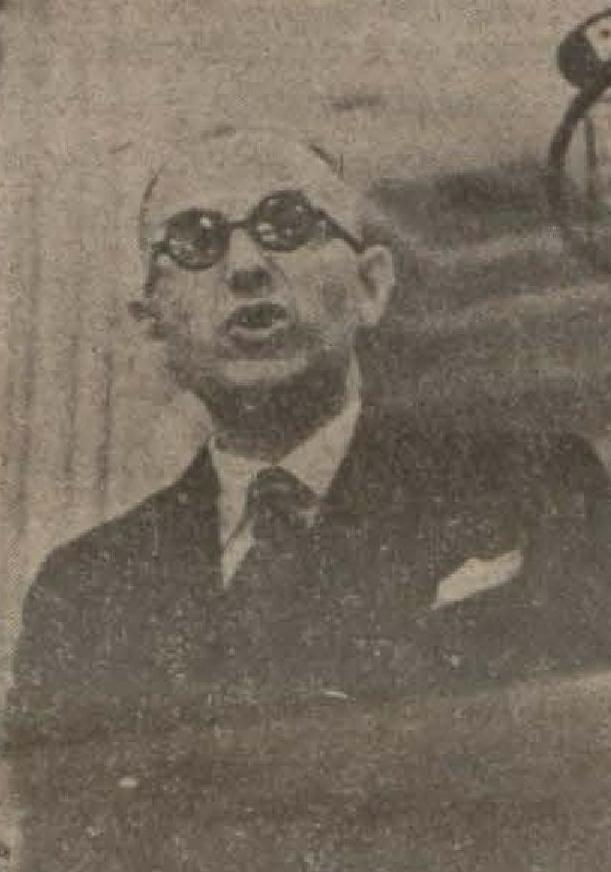
- Dilâçar during a speech
- Born: Hagop Martayan; May 3, 1895; Istanbul, Ottoman Empire
- Died: September 12, 1979 (aged 84); Istanbul, Turkey
- Occupations: Linguist, writer

Agop Dilâçar (Armenian: Յակոբ Մարթայեան Hagop Martayan 22 May 1895 – 12 September 1979) was a Turkish-Armenian linguist who specialized in Turkic languages and head western languages specialist of the Turkish Language Association. He was proficient in 12 languages, including Armenian, Turkish, English, French, Greek, Spanish, Azerbaijani, Latin, German, Russian and Bulgarian.

== Biography ==
Of Armenian descent, Agop Dilâçar was born Hagop Martayan in Istanbul in 1895. His father was Vahan Martayan and his mother Eugenie Martayan (née Sarafian). He studied English in the local American School editing the school's publication "School News" (1907). In 1910, Dilâçar studied at the Robert College where he also learned German, Latin and Classical Greek, graduating in 1915. After completing his studies, he served as an officer in the Ottoman Army's Second Division in Diyarbakır. Dilâçar was awarded for his bravery and continued serving in the Ottoman Army reserves. Because of his knowledge of English, he worked as a Turkish Army interpreter for the British prisoners of war held after the Siege of Kut south of Baghdad. Dilâçar was arrested and escorted to Damascus for alleged secret extrajudicial contacts with the British prisoners. In Damascus, he was introduced for the first time to Mustafa Kemal Pasha (later known as Atatürk). Mustafa Kemal Pasha was then the Commander of the Ottoman Army's Seventh Division. Mustafa Kemal was impressed by Dilâçar's intelligence and secured a pardon for him and took him into his headquarters.

In 1918, Dilâçar moved to Lebanon, where he became the headmaster of Beirut's Sourp Nshan Armenian National School. In Lebanon, he established Louys, an Armenian periodical (in Armenian Լոյս, meaning «The Light»). In 1919, he returned to Istanbul where he worked as a lecturer of English at the Robert College. In 1922, he married Méliné Martayan and the couple moved to Bulgaria where he taught Ottoman Turkish and ancient East languages at Sofia University in Sofia, Bulgaria. In Sofia he also published the Armenian weekly Mshagouyt (in Armenian Մշակոյթ, meaning «Culture») and the monthly Armenian periodical Rahvira (in Armenian Ռահվիրայ).

Dilâçar published a study of Turkish language in Istanbul's Arevelk (in Armenian Արեւելք, meaning «The East»). A translated copy of the article gained the attention of Mustafa Kemal Pasha who invited him to return to Turkey where he lectured in Faculty of Languages, History and Geography.

On 22 September 1932, Dilâçar was invited as a linguist to the First Turkish Language Congress held in Dolmabahçe Palace supervised by Atatürk, the founder and first president of the Republic of Turkey, together with two other linguists of Armenian ethnicity, İstepan Gurdikyan and Kevork Simkeşyan. He continued his work and research on the Turkish language as the head Western languages specialist of the newly founded Turkish Language Association in Ankara. Following the issue of the Law on Family Names in 1934, Mustafa Kemal Pasha suggested him the surname Dilaçar (literally meaning «Language Opener»), which he gladly accepted. Nevertheless, he continued to use the surname Martayan to sign his articles in Armenian.

Dilâçar taught history and language at Ankara University between 1936 and 1951. He also was the head adviser of the Türk Ansiklopedisi (Turkish Encyclopedia), between 1942 and 1960. He held his position and continued his research in linguistics at the Turkish Language Association until his death on 12 September 1979, in Istanbul.

== Armenian publications ==
In addition to his work in Turkish language, Dilâçar also published in Istanbul's Armenian media, in particular with the Armenian daily Marmara (in Armenian Մարմարա).

In 1922, Dilâçar published his literary work Aratchin Portsutyun (in Armenian «Առաջին Փորձութիւն» meaning «First Try»). Also in 1922, he translated Armenian playwright Levon Shant's play Hin Asdvadzner (in Armenian «Հին աստվածներ» meaning «Old Gods») to English. In 1929 he published his Armenological study "Kri Dzakoume yev Daradzoume" (in Armenian «Գրի ծագումը և տարածումը» meaning «The Origin and Spread of Language») and in 1929 "Hapetapanoutyun" (in Armenian «Հաբեթաբանութիւն») in addition to an Armenian translation of a collection of English poetry under the title Albyoni Bardezen (in Armenian «Ալբիոնի պարտէզէն» meaning «From the Garden of Albion») also in 1929.

In 1951, Dilâçar published his book Hazar Hink Harur Amyagi Khoher («1500ամեակի խոհեր» - meaning «Thoughts on the 1500th Anniversary»). In 1956 he published his book Asdvadzashountche yev Ashkharhapare (in Armenian «Աստուածաշունչը եւ Աշխարհաբարը» meaning «The Holy Bible and Modern Armenian Language»).

Dilâçar had numerous written works in linguistics, literature, studies and translations in Armenian. For example his literary work Salin Vra (Kragan Portser) (in Armenian Սալին Վրայ (գրական փորձեր), a collection of poems Khonchadz Yerazner (in Armenian «Խոնջած Երազներ»), a theatrical piece Tsaykatiter (in Armenian «Ցայգաթիթեռ») and studies like "Levon Shant, Ir Pilisopayoutyune yev Kegharvesde" (in Armenian Լեւոն Շանթ՝ Իր Փիլիսոփայութիւնը եւ Գեղարուեստը, meaning «Levon Shant, his Philosophy and Artistry») and "Hay Tyutsaznavebe, Pakhtadadagan Himi Vera" (in Armenian Հայ Դիւցազնավէպը Բաղդատատական Հիմի Վրայ meaning «The Armenian Heroic Epic Novel on a Comparative Basis»).

== Armenian descent ==
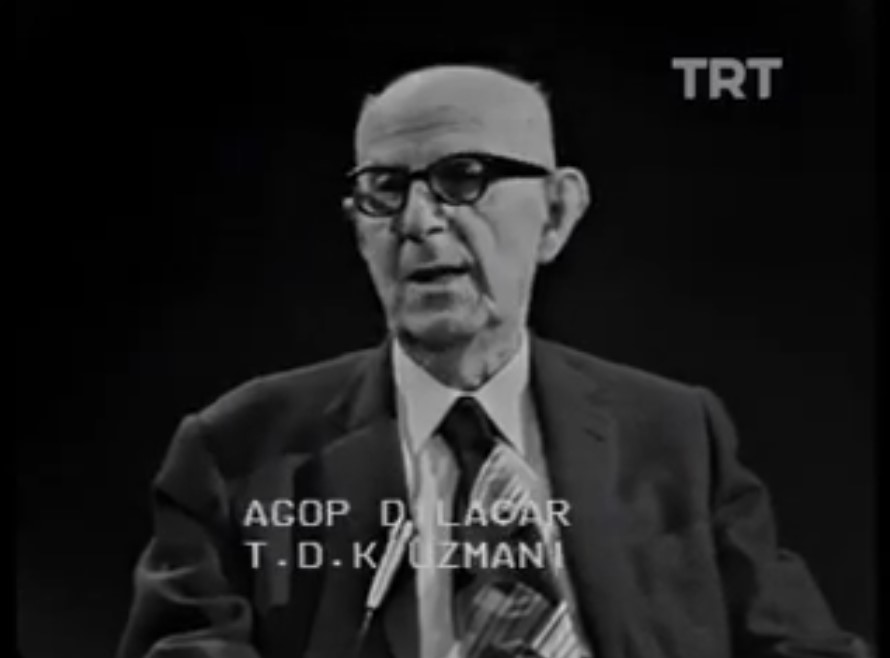
Agop Dilaçar, the 32nd episode of the program "Memories from Atatürk", broadcast on TRT in 1979

After his death in 1979, it was claimed that TRT, the only Turkish television channel at the time, concealed the first name "Agop", which would suggest an Armenian descent, and instead mentioned "A. Dilaçar", using only the initial of his forename together with his surname. However, in a TV program in TRT, which Dilaçar joined, his first name was pronounced and spelled as well, crediting him "Agop Dilaçar, TDK Uzmanı".

== Controversy ==
It is an issue of controversy whether Dilâçar was the person who officially proposed the surname Atatürk to the founder of Turkey, Mustafa Kemal Pasha, or Saffet Arıkan's "Ulu Önderimiz Ata Türk Mustafa Kemal" (Our Great Leader father of Turk Mustafa Kemal) sentence in the opening speech of the 2nd Language Day on 26 September 1934 became an inspiration for surname Atatürk. Contemporary newspapers and other articles favor the latter claim.

== Publications ==
in Turkish

- Azeri Türkçesi (Azerbaijani Turkish), 1950
- Batı Türkçesi (Western Turkish), 1953
- Lehçelerin Yazılma Tarzı (Writing Style of Dialects)
- Türk Dil ve Lehçelerinin Tasnifi Meselesi (Classification Issue of the Turkish Languages and Dialects), 1954
- Devlet Dili Olarak Türkçe (Turkish as a State Language), 1962
- Wilhelm Thomsen ve Orhon Yazıtlarının Çözülüşü (Wilhelm Thomson and Encoding of the Orkhon Inscriptions), 1963
- Türk Diline Genel Bir Bakış (A General Look at the Turkish Language), 1964
- Türkiye'de Dil Özleşmesi (Language Purification in Turkey), 1965
- Dil, Diller ve Dilcilik (Language, Languages and Linguistics), 1968
- Kutadgu Bilig İncelemesi (Research of the Kutadgu Bilig), 1972
- Anadili İlkeleri ve Türkiye Dışındaki Uygulamalar (Native Language Principles and Applications Outside Turkey), 1978

in French

- Les bases bio-psychologiques de la Théorie Güneş Dil (1936)

in Armenian

- 1500ամեակի խոհեր (Hazar Hink Harur Amyagi Khoher, Thoughts on the 1500th Anniversary), 1951
- Աստուածաշունչը եւ աշխարհաբարը (Asdvadzashountche yev Ashkharhapare, The Bible and the Armenian Modern Language), 1956
- Յօդուածներ (Hotvadzner, Articles), 2000
- Համայնապատկեր հայ մշակոյթի (Hamaynabadger Hay Meshagouyti Panorama of the Armenian Culture), vol. I, 2004
- Համայնապատկեր հայ մշակոյթի (Hamaynabadger Hay Meshagouyti Panorama of the Armenian Culture), vol. II, 2005

== See also ==
- Turkish language
- Turkish Language Association
- Atatürk's Reforms
- Sun Language Theory
- Karamanoğlu Mehmet Bey
- Hagop Vahram Çerçiyan
