= Maryam Şahinyan =

Armenian-Turkish photographer

Maryam Sahinyan and her Foto Galatasaray Studio

Maryam Şahinyan (Armenian: Մարիամ Շահինյան; 1911 in Sivas – 1996 in Istanbul, Turkey) was a famed photographer who is considered the first woman studio photographer in Turkey. She was of Armenian descent.

== Life ==
Maryam Şahinyan was born at Şahinyan Konağı, now known as the Camlı Köşk in the city center of Sivas, Turkey. Her family owned much land in the region, including thirty villages and five flour mills and her grandfather, Agop Şahinyan Paşa, was the representative of Sivas in the first Ottoman Parliament. Her family lost their property and social standing during the Armenian Genocide, and moved to an apartment in the Harbiye district of Istanbul. Şahinyan attended the local Armenian school Esayan and later the French Lycée Français Privé Sainte-Pulchérie.

In 1936, Şahinyan's mother, Dikranuhi Şahinyan, died. Şahinyan was forced to leave school and start work for her father, Mihran, in the Galatasaray Photography Studio in the Beyoğlu district. Mihran had become a partner in the studio a few years prior, in 1933. Şahinyan became interested in photography, and in 1937 began managing the studio herself. She retired in 1985, having produced a collection of approximately 200,000 images.

She died at her home on Hanımefendi Sokak in Şişli in 1996 and is buried in Şişli Armenian Cemetery. Maryam Şahinyan is considered the first woman photographer in Turkey. She knew French, Italian, Armenian and Turkish.
