= Boğaziçi Jazz Choir =

Bogazici Jazz Choir (Turkish: Boğaziçi Caz Korosu) is a vocal ensemble founded in 2011 by Masis Aram Gözbek. The choir has won numerous awards both in Turkey and internationally.

The choir's primary aim is to introduce polyphonic music to wider audiences and represent Turkey in international competitions.

== History ==
The foundations of the Bogazici Jazz Choir were laid in 1994 within the Bogazici University Music Club (BÜMK). When Masis Aram Gözbek joined as the conductor in 2007, the group operated under the BÜMK umbrella between 2007 and 2011. In 2011, the choir became an independent ensemble under the name "Bogazici Jazz Choir."

The choir gained public recognition in 2011 after a jazz performance at the Taksim metro station went viral online.

During the Gezi Park protests, the choir adapted the lyrics of "Entarisi Ala Benziyor" into "Çapulcu Musun Vay Vay" and "Kızılcıklar Oldu Mu" into "Çapulcular Oldu Mu" as a form of musical support. These adaptations quickly gained popularity and were widely sung during the protests. Choirs abroad also took interest in these adaptations and requested permission to include them in their repertoires.

== Repertoire ==
The choir's repertoire includes jazz and contemporary music pieces as well as arrangements of Turkish folk music and Turkish classical music. Additionally, a cappella performances play a significant role in their programs.

== Achievements ==
Bogazici Jazz Choir has performed at numerous festivals worldwide and has won various international awards. The choir's first international success came in 2008 at the "Vokal Total" competition in Austria, where they won silver diplomas in both pop and jazz categories.

In 2010, at the 6th World Choir Games in China, they won second place in the Contemporary Music category and third place in both the Chamber Choir and Jazz categories, earning three gold diplomas.

In 2011, at the World Choir Games in Austria, the choir won the world championship in the Contemporary Music and Folklore categories and finished second in the Mixed Choirs category. They also won two additional gold medals in the Grand Prix, bringing their total to five gold medals.

In 2012, at the 7th World Choir Games in the United States, the choir won three more gold medals.

In 2014, in Bulgaria's Varna city, at the 35th International May Choir Competition, the choir won first place in the Mixed Choirs category, and conductor Masis Aram Gözbek received the Young Conductor Special Award.

In 2016, at the 64th European Young Musicians Festival in Belgium, the choir won first prize in two categories.

In 2019, at the Ohrid Choir Festival in North Macedonia, where 34 choirs from 13 countries competed, the choir won the Grand Prix, first place, Best Stage Performance, and Category Championship awards.

In 2021, due to the COVID-19 pandemic, the choir participated in the Barcelona International Choir Festival online and won first place in the Mixed Choirs category with their video performance.
