= Surp Yerrortutyun Armenian Catholic Church =

Armenian Catholic church in Istanbul

- Surp Yerrortutyun Kilisesi
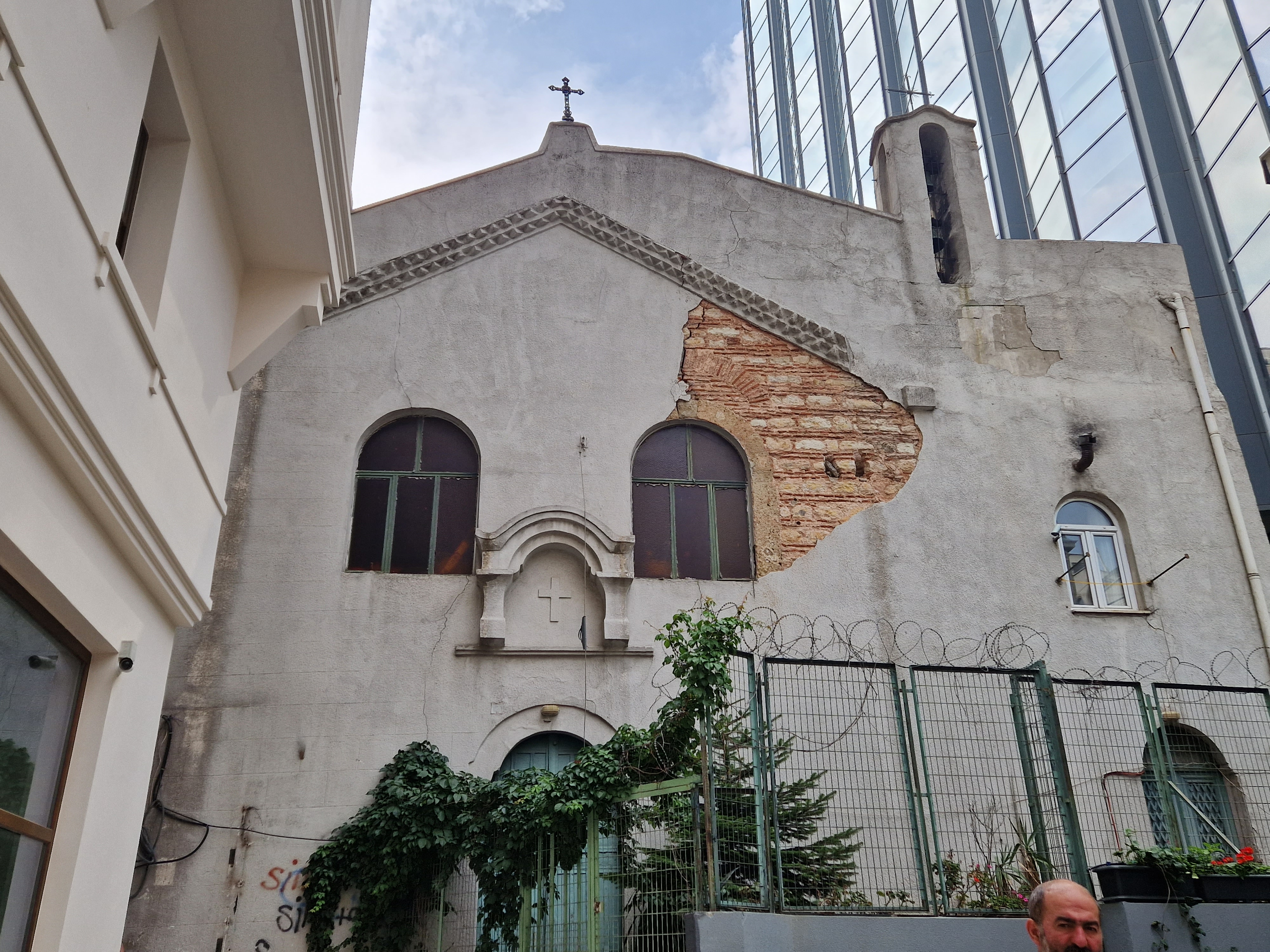
- Surp Yerrortutyun Church façade
- Surp Yerrortutyun Armenian Catholic Church
- 41°01′54.0″N 28°58′31.7″E
- Location: Beyoğlu, Istanbul
- Country: Turkey
- Denomination: Catholic Church
- Sui iuris church: Armenian Catholic Church

Architecture
- Completed: 1836

Surp Yerrortutyun Armenian Church (Armenian: Սուրբ Երրորդութիւն Եկեղեցի; also known as the Church of the Holy Trinity), is an Armenian Catholic Church located in the Beyoğlu district of Istanbul, Turkey.

== History ==
The original structure on the site was built in the late 16th century by four Austrian priests as a wooden chapel and guest house dedicated to the Holy Trinity. The church burned down and was reconstructed in 1762. Between 1802 and 1854, it served as the cathedral for the Latin Catholic community and the seat of the Apostolic Vicariate of Istanbul.

The building was damaged by fire again in 1831 and was rebuilt in its current form in 1836. On May 25, 1857, the church was purchased by the Armenian Catholic community from the Austrians. As part of the purchase agreement between the Vatican Representative, the Armenian Catholic primate Andon Hasun, and the Austrian Ambassador Baron Prokesch Osten, the imperial coat of arms of Austria was preserved above the church entrance, where it remains visible today.
