= Zaven Biberyan =

Armenian writer (1921–1984)

- Զաւէն Պիպեռեան
- Zaven Biberyan
- Born: 1921; Istanbul, Turkey
- Died: October 4, 1984 (aged 62–63); Istanbul, Turkey
- Spouse: Seta Hıdıryan
- Children: Tilda Mangasaryan

Zaven Biberyan (Armenian: Զաւէն Պիպեռեան; 1921 in Istanbul, Turkey – October 4, 1984) was an Armenian writer, editor, and author from Turkey.

== Early life ==
Biberyan was born in Cengelkoy, a district of Istanbul in 1921. He first attended the local Aramyan-Uncuyan Armenian school and later Saint Joseph High School. He then attended the academy of Trade Sciences in Istanbul.

== Career as writer ==
Zaven Biberyan had always written in Armenian. When Biberyan was conscripted into the Turkish Army in 1941, he met with Jamanak chief editor Ara Kocunyan. Kocunyan was impressed by Biberyan's Armenian linguistic skills and encouraged him to write an article for Jamanak. After returning to Istanbul, Biberyan wrote his first article called "The End of Christianity." This article led to a great furor among the Armenian community and his article series were suspended. He later wrote for Armenian newspapers such as Nor Or (New Day) and Nor Lur (New News). After coming under pressure by some of his more socialist-oriented articles, Biberyan went to Beirut, Lebanon in 1949 and continued as a writer for Zartonk. He also served on the Ararat editorial board in Aleppo and Paris. In 1953, he returned to Istanbul and married Seta Hıdıryan and had a daughter. He then worked for the Ottoman Bank. Biberyan contracted an ulcer in 1984 and died on October 4. He is buried at the Şişli Armenian Cemetery in Istanbul.

== Political career ==
During the Workers Party of Turkey 1965 general elections, Biberyan stood as a candidate to a seat in parliament. However, he was not elected. In 1968 he then served as an assistant to the vice president of the Municipal Assembly.

== Works ==
- Lgrdadze (Impudent) (Doğu Basımevi – 1959. Armenian.)
- Dzove (The Sea) (Getronagan Okulundan Yetişenler Derneği Yayını – 1961. Armenian.)
- Angoodi Siraharnere (Penniless Lovers) (To Yayınları – 1962. Armenian.)
- Mrchunneroo Verchalooyse (The Dusk of the Ants) (Murat Ofset – 1984. October 2007 – Aras Publishing House. Armenian.)
- Yalnizlar (The Lonely Ones) (May 2012 – Aras Publishing House. Turkish.)
- Babam Aşkale'ye Gitmedi (My Father didn't go to Aşkale) (October 2000 – Aras Publishing House. Turkish.)
