= Surp Yerrortutyun Armenian Church =

Armenian Catholic church in Istanbul, Turkey

Surp Yerrortutyun Armenian Church Սուրբ Երրորդութիւն Եկեղեցի Beyoğlu Üç Horan Ermeni Kilisesi
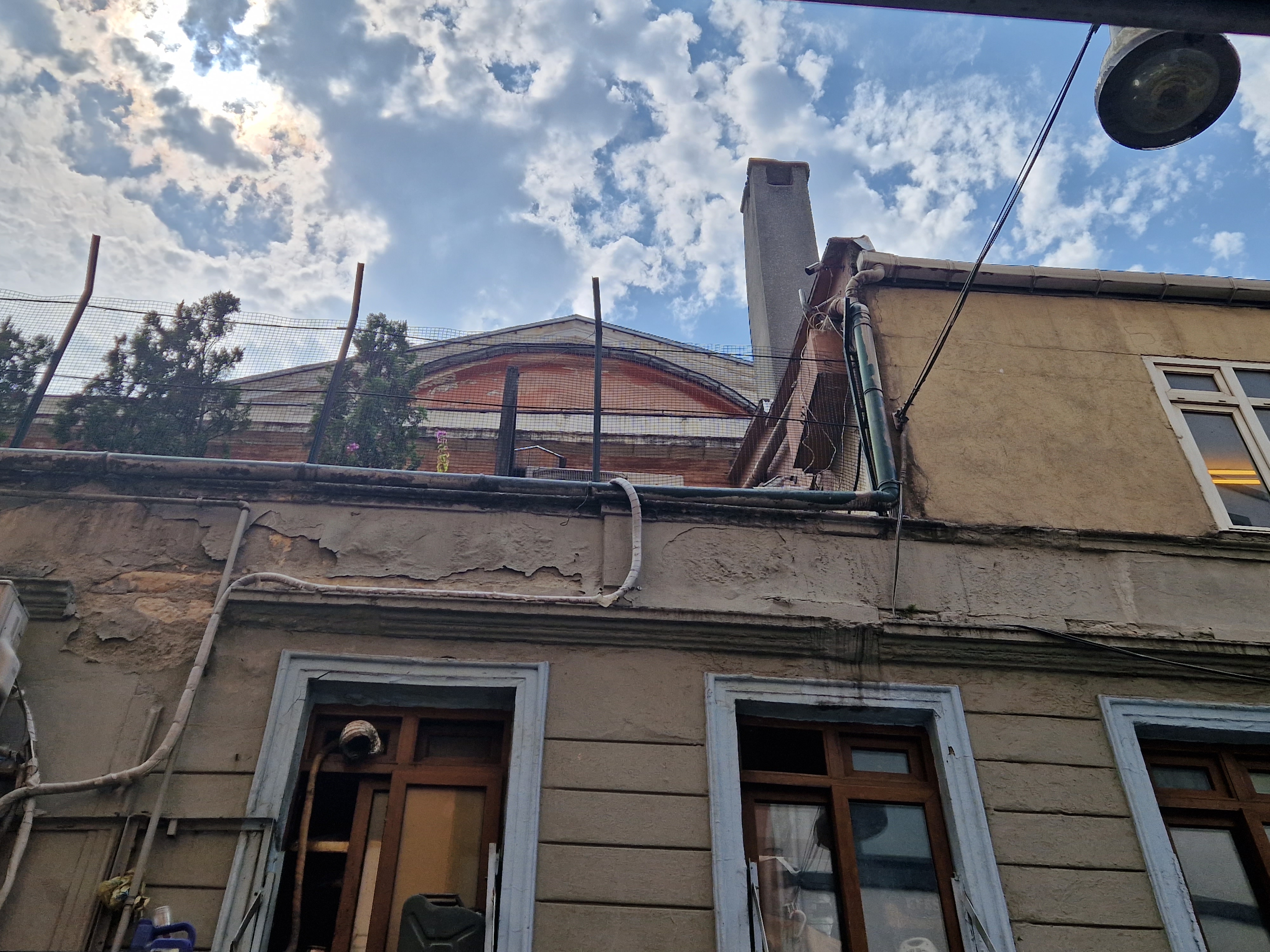

- Location of Surp Yerrortutyun Armenian Church in Istanbul.

Religion
- Affiliation: Armenian Catholic Church
- Year consecrated: 18 June 1838; 188 years ago
- Status: Active

Location
- Location: Beyoğlu, Istanbul, Turkey
- Interactive map of Surp Yerrortutyun Armenian Church; Սուրբ Երրորդութիւն Եկեղեցի; Beyoğlu Üç Horan Ermeni Kilisesi
- Coordinates: 41.03451°N 28.97796°E

Architecture
- Architect: Garabet Balyan
- Type: Armenian

Surp Yerrortutyun Armenian Church (Armenian: Սուրբ Երրորդութիւն Եկեղեցի, Turkish: Beyoğlu Üç Horan Ermeni Kilisesi) is a 19th-century Armenian church located in Istanbul, Turkey.

== Location ==
Located in Beyoğlu district of Istanbul in Turkey, Surp Yerrortutyun Church borders to Sahne sokak (formerly: Tiyatro sokak) in the west, to Nevizade sokak (formerly: Ermeni kilisesi sokak) in the north, to Solakzade sokak (formerly: Sol sokak) in the east and to buildings and Tokatlıyan Han on İstiklal Avenue in the south.

== History ==
The church building was initially constructed in wood by Europeans in early 16th century on the uphill of Galata in Constantinopleto be used by the servants of the diplomatic missions in Pera. According to a handwritten document bearing the seal of the Ottoman Sultan, the wooden church and its real estate were purchased in 1515 by the Armenian community from Greeks in 1515. The church was named "Surp Yerrortutyun" ("Üç Horan" Turkish for Holy Trinity). The Church of Galata served the community ten years long until it was closed down by the priests and the trustees. Several fires caused that no information between the 16th and the 19th century remained. According to a document preserved in the Galata Church, the real estate of the Surp Yerrortutyun Church was extended by purchasing of neighboring grounds through notables of the community initiated by the trustee Krikor Amira Kevorkyan-Çerazyan. On the site of the Surp Yerrortutyun Churchü, an infant school was built named "Surp Echmiadzin". During the reign of Sultan Mahmud II (r. 1808–1839), the building was converted into a church. The wooden church, which was consecrated in the name "Surp Yerrortutyun" during the Pentecost in 1807, burnt down in 1810. The church service continued with a temporary altar. The destroyed building was demolished with an imperial order in 1836. The current church was built with the financial support of the Armenian community. It was designed and constructed by Garabet Balyan, Hamamcıbaşı Minas Agha and Hovhannes Serveryan. The building had annexes for the clergy, priests and the trustees. The church was opened on 18 June 1838 following its consecration.

From 1838 on, the church was administrated by an independent board of trustees and clergy. With an imperial order dated 16 December 1845, the church building was restored. In 1846, a coeducational school building, named Naregyan School, and some other annexes were constructed inside the courtyard of the church. The additional buildings were restored in 1867. However, they were destroyed during the 1870 Beyoğlu Fire. A three-store masonry building was constructed replacing the old one. The church's title deed was registered on 14 November 1889. The church building was restored with an imperial order of 13 February 1890. The latest restoration took place in 1989. The poorhouse in the northeastern corner of the courtyard was converted into a dispensary in 1897.

In October 2018, the real estate of the church, which was confiscated earlier, was returned to the church's foundation.

== Architecture ==
The architecture and decoration of the Surp Yerrortutyun Church, which is shaped by western forms and has almost no traces of the Armenian architecture, is completely based on symmetry and harmony. Architect Balyan applied classical style of Ancient Greek and Ancient Roman architecture designing the exterior of the building in Doric order and the interior in Corinthian order.

The church building is a basilical structure with one nave. It occupies 1,042 m^{2} (11,220 sq ft) in the middle of a big courtyard. There are two rooms in the west, which are symmetrical to the chapels situated in the east. The southwestern rppm is a chapel is dedicated to Surp Minas, while. The northwestern room is used as a morgue. A staircase in this room leads to the bell tower. The masonry church's facade is covered with stone slabs. The northern, southern and eastern facades have an alternating bicolor texture. The western facade and all the corners and windows are accentuated with marble ornaments giving a rustic architecture appearance. The western facade with three-story appearance has gablets. External decorations are doorposts, rectangular windows with stone frame, metallic black painted doors of the church and the annexes enriched with gold color, marble inscriptions, half-round-arched and oval windows with metallic radial ornaments as well as sharp-profiled moldings between the stories.

A metallic mausoleum in the form of a church belonging to Patriarch Hagopos IV of Jolfa (died 1680) is found north of the church in the courtyard, which was initially situated at the Pangaltı Armenian Cemetery until the cemetery was demolished in the 1930s. In the south, the sarcophagus of Patriarch Ignatios I of Constantinople (died 1869) is located.

A four-wing iron door gives entry to the church in the west side. The narthex at the western entrance is divided symmetrically by inline-standing three fluted columns with Corinthian capital, which bear the gallery atop.

The two aisles are raised by two step, and separated by the nave by iron railings. The church's inner space, surrounded by partly more than 130 cm (51 in) thick walls, is around 342 m^{2} (3,680 sq ft). The interior of the church is dusky despite the rectangular windows lined up symmetrically on the northern and southern sides. The inner walls are decorated with plasters of fluted Corinth column, arches on windows, keystones with crucifix motifs, cornices, cantilevers with acanthus reliefs under the vaults, alternate lined rosette decorations as well as the ornaments in Ancient Greek and Ancient Roman architectural style on the half-round ceiling of the apse.

Oil painting portraits of the apostles and the four Evangelists are found inside rectangular frames as part of a vault in the form of a large-sized elliptical arc. The gilded altar and the choir is separated from the nave by a latticework wooden railing with star motifa. The northern semitransept holds an altar attributed to a composition of "Appearance of Jesus" above a gilded wooden altar devoted to Holy Trinity, and the southern semitransept holds an altar attributed to a composition of Mother Mary. Two chapels with barrel vault are accessible from the choir through doors. The northern chapel is dedicated to Surp Dznunt-Vaftizhane while the southern one is devoted to Surp Krikor Lusavoriç.

== Activities ==
With the initiative of the "Union of Ottoman Constitution" and the "Armenian Club", a ceremony titled "Liberty" was held on 31 July 1908 in honor of Muslims, who died during the 31 March Incident.

In 1926, a church choir with 84 female and male singers was established by Nerses Hüdaverdiyan.
