= Assassination of Hrant Dink =

2007 murder of Turkish-Armenian journalist

Coordinates: 41°03′09.6″N 28°59′15.2″E

- Part of Anti-Armenian sentiment in Turkey
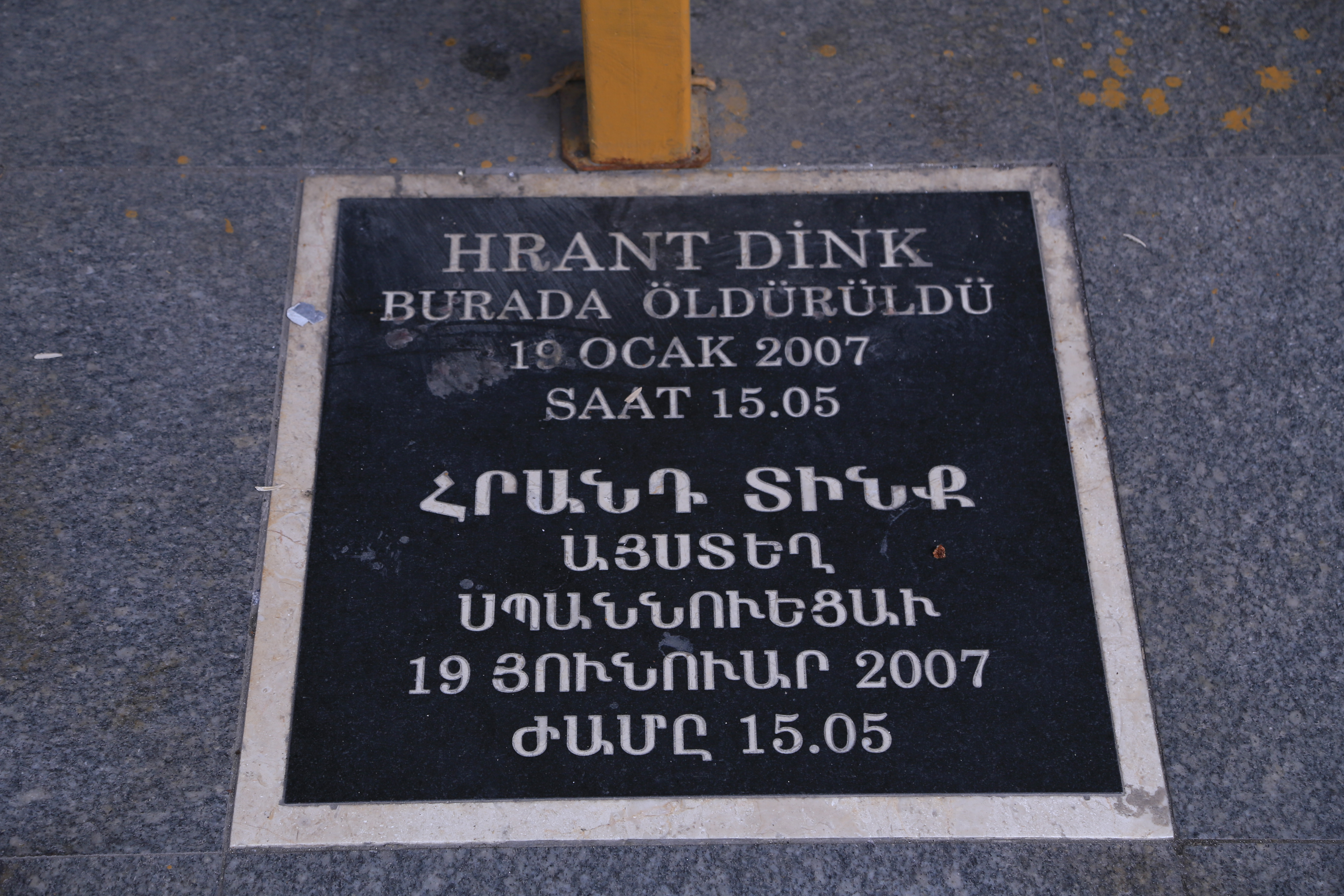
- Commemorative plaque for Hrant Dink
- Location: Istanbul
- Date: January 19, 2007; 19 years ago 12:00 GMT, 15:00 TRT
- Target: Hrant Dink X
- Perpetrator: Ogün Samast
- Charges: Various (Note: Destroying or forging official documents, being a member of an armed terrorist organization, killing by using an other person or deliberate killing with negligent act, and others. See Trial for more information.)
- Convicted: Ogün Samast, Erhan Tuncel, and 24 others

The prominent Turkish-Armenian journalist Hrant Dink was assassinated in Istanbul on 19 January 2007. Dink was a newspaper editor who had written and spoken about the Armenian genocide and was well known for his efforts for reconciliation between Turks and Armenians and his advocacy of human and minority rights in Turkey. At the time of his death, he was on trial for violating Article 301 of the Turkish Penal Code and "denigrating Turkishness". His murder sparked both massive national protests in Turkey itself as well as widespread international outrage.

Dink was assassinated by Ogün Samast who was sentenced to at least 25 years in prison. Erhan Tuncel, who orchestrated the assassination, received 99 1/2 years in prison.

== Death threats ==
Dink had long endured threats by extreme Turkish nationalists for his statements on Armenian identity and the Armenian Genocide. He regularly received emails threatening his life, responding in one instance by comparing himself to a dove, "equally obsessed by what goes on on my left and right, front and back. My head is just as mobile and fast".

In his final Agos column on 10 January 2007, Dink noted that propaganda targeting him led many Turkish citizens to consider him an enemy of Turkey:

"It is obvious that those wishing to alienate me and make me weak and defenseless reached their goal. Right now they have brought about a significant circle of people who are not low in number and who regard me as someone "insulting Turkish identity" due to dirty and false information."

He also complained of the indifference of Turkish authorities to his security:

"My diary and the memory of my computer are full of messages from citizens of this circle full of rage and threats. (Let me note that I regarded one among them posted from Bursa as an imminent threat and submitted it to Public Prosecutor’s office in Şişli but got no result.)"

Despite his complaints, Dink never formally requested protection from the authorities because he did not want to lead a sheltered life. His lawyer, Erdal Doğan, confirmed this feeling of Dink. A week before his assassination, Dink wrote that he felt "nervous and afraid" owing to the intensity of the hate mail he had been receiving: "I see myself as frightened, the way a dove might be, but I know that the people in this country would never harm a dove." He also stated: "This is an operation of the depth of the state to make me know my place".

== Assassination ==
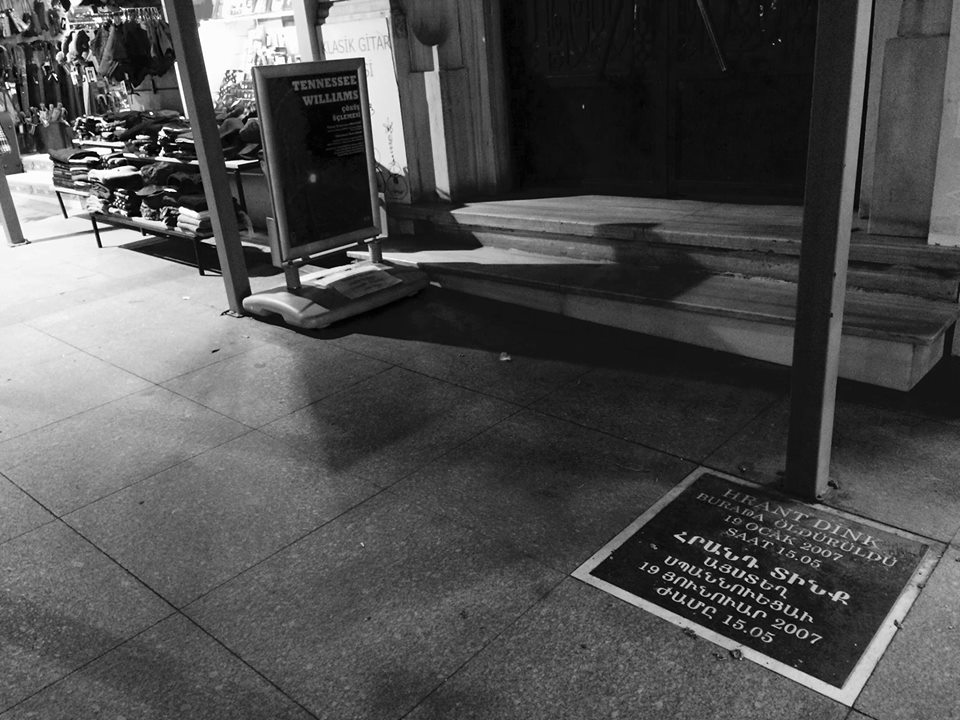
Hrant Dink was assassinated in Istanbul around 12:00 GMT on 19 January 2007, as he returned to the offices of Agos

Dink was shot dead in Şişli, Istanbul at around 12:00 GMT on 19 January 2007 as he returned to the offices of Agos. The killer was reported to have introduced himself as an Ankara University student who wanted to meet with Mr. Dink. When his request was rejected, he waited in front of a nearby bank for a while. According to eyewitnesses, Dink was shot by a man of 25 to 30 years of age, who fired three shots at Dink's head from the back at point blank range before fleeing the scene on foot. According to the police, the assassin was a man of 18 to 19 years of age. Two men had been taken into custody in the first hours of the police investigation, but were later released. Another witness, the owner of a restaurant near the Agos office, said the assassin looked about 20, wore jeans and a cap and shouted "I shot the infidel" as he left the scene. Dink's friend Orhan Alkaya suggested that the three-shot assassination technique was a signature mark of the Kurdish Hezbollah. Dink's wife and daughter collapsed when they heard the news, and were taken to the hospital.

=== Capture of the suspected shooter ===
One day after the assassination, the police announced that the shooter had been identified in video footage collected through both the Istanbul MOBESE electronic surveillance network (4,000+ cameras throughout the city) and local security cameras. They later released photos to the public while urging every citizen to aid with the investigation. On the same evening, Istanbul Governor Muammer Güler addressed the press to state that special investigation committees were pursuing nearly two dozen leads and that the police were analyzing ten thousand phone calls made from the vicinity of the crime scene.

News agencies reported on Saturday, 18:22 GMT, that the shooter had been identified as "Ogün Samast", a teenager born in 1990 and registered as residing in Trabzon, the same city where, a year before Dink's assassination, the Catholic priest Andrea Santoro was shot dead by a 16-year-old native of the city, in front of the church of Santa Maria of Trabzon, which is a nationalist gathering center. In recent years, Trabzon has become an important recruiting place for ultra-nationalist movements. Samast's father identified him from the publicly released photos and alerted the authorities. Six people, including Samast's friend Yasin Hayal, who had been involved in a bombing of a McDonald's restaurant in Trabzon in 2004, were taken into custody and brought to Istanbul.

== Funeral ==
Dink's funeral service was held on 23 January 2007 in the Surp Asdvadzadzin Patriarchal Church in the Kumkapı neighborhood of Istanbul. Dink's funeral ceremony developed into a demonstration at which a hundred thousand citizens marched in protest of the killing.

The service was attended by members of the Turkish government and representatives from the Armenian diaspora, as well as religious leaders. Although Turkey had no official diplomatic relations with Armenia at that time, by invitation of the Turkish Minister of Foreign Affairs Abdullah Gül, the Armenian Deputy Foreign Minister Arman Kirakosian was present at the funeral. Prime Minister Erdoğan was not present at the funeral, because he had to attend the scheduled inauguration of the Mount Bolu Tunnel.

After the church services, the hearse made a final tour for the thousands of marchers still gathered at Yenikapı, before proceeding to Balıklı Armenian Cemetery in Istanbul's Zeytinburnu neighborhood, where Dink's body was laid to rest. At the cemetery Rev. Krikor Agabaloglu (Pastor of the Armenian Evangelical Church of Gedikpaşa) and Rev. Rene Levonian (Armenian Evangelical World Council's representative) delivered short speeches in Turkish and in Armenian.

The funeral astonished and changed the thoughts of some diaspora Armenians about Turkey. For example, Isabelle Kortian, an important diaspora (French) Armenian who came to Turkey for the funeral of Hrant Dink, wrote an article for a Turkish newspaper Zaman on 25 January 2007 saying "The Turks' embracing Dink made an effect of an earthquake on us".

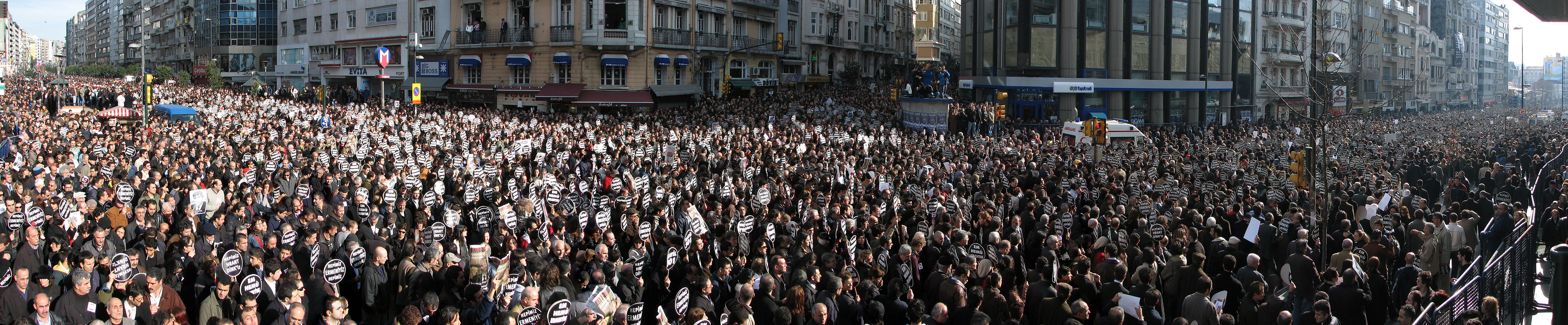
A panorama from Halaskargazi Boulevard in the Şişli district of Istanbul. One hundred thousand mourners marched in Dink's funeral, protesting his assassination. The office of the Agos newspaper, where Dink was gunned down, is near the right edge of the image; it is the first building to the right of the one with the large black banner.

== Investigation ==
The Istanbul Criminology Department stated that from the empty shells, they were able to determine that the assassination weapon used 7.65 millimeter ammunition and had never been used in another crime.

Ahmet Çokçınar, a prosecutor in the city of Samsun told the Anatolia news agency that Samast has confessed to killing Hrant Dink. According to this preliminary news, Samast said the killing was a personal act and did not have any organizational agenda. Samast's uncle Faik Samast has told private NTV television that he didn't think his nephew was capable of acting alone – "He didn't even know his way around Istanbul," "This kid was used." Samast said that he killed Dink for "insulting Turks", and that he doesn't regret it. According to media reports, Samast is a high school dropout and a possible drug addict. Later news reports stated that Samast had had no idea of the significance of his act until watching TV coverage, and that he had ended his written confession with an expression of remorse.

Three people were taken into custody regarding the murder on the day of the killing. However, movements tied to the ultra-nationalist movement are currently suspected of carrying out the murder, in particular after the arrest of Yasin Hayal, a militant who spent 11 months in prison for having taken part in the bombing of a McDonald's in Trabzon in 2004, and of Karadeniz Technical University student Erhan Tuncel, who was close to the Alperen organization, a youth organization associated with the far-right ultra-nationalist Islamist Great Union Party (BBP), created by former members of the Nationalist Movement Party (MHP). Yasin Hayal confessed to telling Samast to kill Dink and supplying the murder weapon, while Erhan Tuncel has been charged as a main instigator of the killing, and allegedly directed both Samast and Hayal. The BBP has denied any involvement in the assassination. Hrant Dink was described as a "traitor" by the Turkish far right, and had received up to 2,600 death threats from ultra-nationalist circles. According to rumors reported by Turkish newspapers in late January 2007, Erhan Tuncel was actually a police informer for the Trabzon Police. The rumors also suggested that he warned Trabzon police office before the murder, but that the warnings were ignored.

Investigations concerning the nationalist underground Ergenekon network have led to suspicions concerning Ergenekon's involvement in Dink's assassination. Folder 441 of the Ergenekon indictment's annex contains evidence that Dink's entire family was targeted. Staff colonel Ferhat Özsoy allegedly pressured chief master sergeant Murat Şahan into carrying out the assassination, offering him 300,000 Lira in reward. Şahan, who was undergoing psychiatric treatment as a result of being 70,000 Lira in debt, resisted and filed a complaint from a military hospital, where he was forced to undergo an examination.

=== Concerns over a possible cover-up ===
On 3 October 2007, the TV station NTV reported that the police file on Erhan Tuncel, a prime suspect in the murder case, had been destroyed on the grounds that the file was a "state secret" before the court had a chance to see the document.

The lawyer for the Dink family, Erdal Doğan, repeated the concern that much evidence was destroyed and lost that might reveal relationships between the suspects and members of the security forces, including a tape from a security camera outside a bank near the Agos offices where Dink was killed. Doğan said that the chief of police intelligence (Turkish: Emniyet Genel Müdürlüğü İstihbarat Daire Başkanı), Ramazan Akyürek, ordered the expungement of a suspect's 48-page testimony.

When the lawyers of the Dink family investigated the security camera records which were screening the street where the assassination took place, they identified four suspects speaking with their cellphones. Thereupon they requested the GSM call operation logs of the Şişli region Turkish Telecommunication Authorities around the time when the murder happened and the time where they identified the cell phone usage from the security cameras. Two major GSM providers reported that they do not have any GSM base station in that region, hence they cannot identify anything. The other major GSM operator in Turkey stated that there was no single call operation during the reported times. The lawyers stated that it is almost impossible that there cannot have been any calls during these hours or that the companies cannot have any base station, because Şişli is one of the most crowded regions in Istanbul at those times. In addition the security camera recordings shows that there was GSM communication indeed during that times.

Yakup Kurtan, a police officer who took a celebratory photo with Samast 2 days after his killing of Dink, was promoted to deputy chief of the Malatya police.

In 2013 a secret witness told prosecutors of JITEM and Gendarmerie involvement in Dink's murder.

On 12 January 2015, arrest warrants were issued for two police officers, making them the first public servants arrested in the investigation.

On 12 March 2020, retired intelligence sergeant Şeref Ateş, an alleged witness in the assassination was assassinated while driving his vehicle in the town of Düzce by gunman from another car. 3 suspects were subsequently arrested for assassinating Ateş, yet their motive remains unknown.

=== Gülen movement ===
Since 2014, allegations about the role of Gülen movement in the assassination have been brought to public attention. Four prosecutors in the trial have been dismissed from their posts due to their ties with the movement, and for failing to make progress with the case. Furthermore police commissioners Ramazan Akyürek and Ali Fuat Yılmazer were accused of not sharing their foreknowledge of the attack with the prosecutors, gendarmarie, or the intelligence services despite being briefed of a planned assassination several times. In 2020 Ramazan Akyürek and Ali Fuat Yılmazer were sentenced to 45 and 7 and a half years of prison respectively for illegal audio recordings of senior government officials.

A Turkish court also said that 18 suspects in the case, among them 13 government officials were using the application ByLock on their phones, which Turkish Government claims are the communication tool of Gülen movement followers.

== Reactions ==
After the news of his assassination spread, condemnations came instantly from virtually all major political parties, government officials and NGOs in Turkey, as well as from many international observers.

=== Turkey ===
==== Condemnations ====
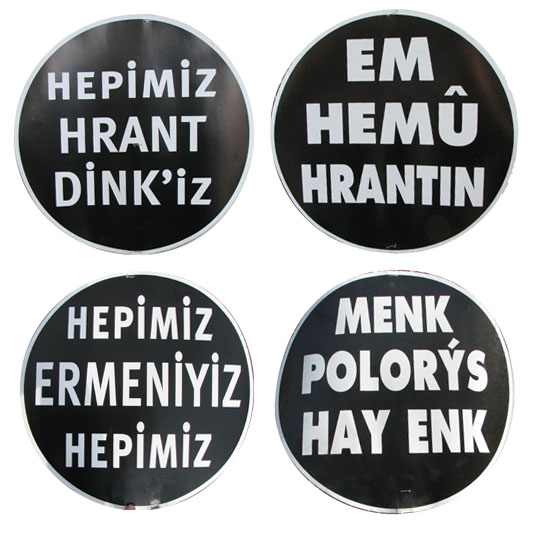
Placards held in Dink's funeral reading "We are all Hrant Dink" and "We are all Armenian" in Turkish, Kurdish and Armenian. These placards were later protested by MHP, a major Turkish political party of the far right.

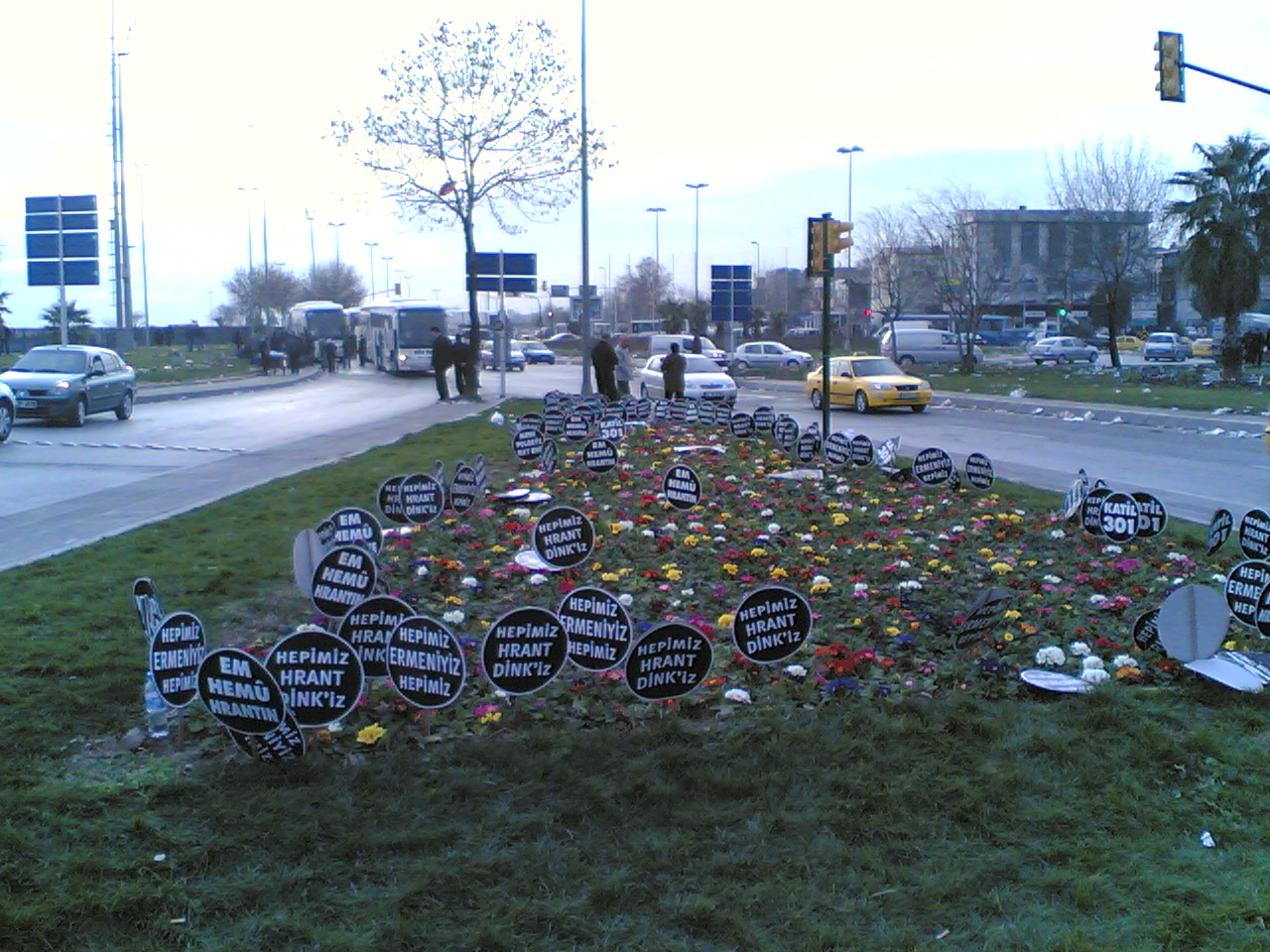
Placards planted in flower beds after the funeral

- Hundreds of thousands of people marched in Istanbul from the Agos newspaper's office to the Taksim Square in a protest against the assassination. According to the BBC, protesters chanted "We are all Armenian, we are all Hrant Dink. People marched in other cities (including Ankara, Antalya, Bursa, İzmir, Tunceli, and Trabzon) as well to protest the assassination. They also blamed the Turkish state for the assassination, chanting, "The killer state will be held accountable".
- Many press outlets expressed outrage over the killing. Some headlines: "The Murderer Is a Traitor" (Hürriyet), "Same Bloody Scenario" (referring to assassination of prominent journalists in the past) (Akşam), "It Was Turkey That Was Shot Dead" (Milliyet), "Nothing could harm Turkey more than this" (Vatan) and "They Killed Our Brother" (BirGün). Some newspapers blamed the media that supported nationalist points of view around Hrant Dink's trial for denigrating Turkishness, up to the point of declaring him a traitor. One of those headlines was "Be Proud of Your Work" (Radikal)
- Columns in Turkish newspapers included Armenian in transliteration: Ahparik, Ahparik! [Armenian for "brother, brother!"] by Hadi Uluengin in Hürriyet, and Tsidesutyun Paregamis! [Farewell My Friend!] by Can Dundar in Milliyet.
- President Ahmet Necdet Sezer: "I am deeply saddened by the assassination of Hrant Dink in front of the Agos newspaper. I strongly condemn this ugly and shameful act.
- Prime Minister Recep Tayyip Erdoğan: "The dark hands that killed him will be found and punished."
- Armenian Patriarch of Turkey, Mesrob Mutafyan, declared 15 days of mourning for the Armenian community in Turkey.
- Speaker of the Grand National Assembly of Turkey Bülent Arınç,
- Chief of General Staff Yaşar Büyükanıt condemned the assassination.
- Ecumenical Patriarch of Constantinople, Bartholomew I: "We are deeply saddened by the heinous assassination of Hrant Dink, one of our country's prominent journalists".
- Over one hundred thousand people marched in Dink's Funeral to protest against his assassination, holding placards that said "We are all Armenian" and "We are Hrant Dink" in both Turkish, Kurdish and Armenian.(See funeral above.) Later, these placards were protested by the far-right MHP. The leader of MHP described the placards saying "We are all Armenian" as "a freak show organized by those who do not participate in martyr funerals". On the other hand, a party council member of the main-opposition CHP, a member of Socialist International, said "We became ashamed of being Turkish. I am Turkish and I protest the assassination. Maybe we should have carried the placards saying 'We are all Human' instead of 'We are all Armenians'. The placards that say "assassin 301" are also wrong. As long as we do not want to denigrate Turkishness, we cannot call 301 an assassin."
- Nobel Prize-winning Turkish novelist, Orhan Pamuk visited Dink's family in Istanbul on 21 January. "In a sense, we are all responsible for his death," he said. "However, at the very forefront of this responsibility are those who still defend Article 301 of the Turkish Penal Code. Those who campaigned against him, those who portrayed this sibling of ours as an enemy of Turkey, those who painted him as a target, they are the most responsible in this. And then, in the end, we are all responsible."
- Although condemning the murder, columnist Murat Bardakçı in the newspaper Sabah, and, in his footsteps, Sedat Laçiner in an editorial in Journal of Turkish Weekly, pointed out similarities with the assassination of Talaat Pasha in Berlin in 1921 by Soghomon Tehlirian, and more generally drew attention to politically motivated killings of Turks by Armenians.
- Author Taner Akçam also criticised the murder and stated that it was similar to Talaat's death.

==== Subsequent actions ====
- Hüseyin Yavuzdemir, governor of Trabzon and Reşat Altay, chief of police of Trabzon were removed from duty and a special investigation team was sent from Ankara to Trabzon to investigate the situation in the city.
- A ferryboat on the Gelibolu–Lapseki line was hijacked by Nihat Acar (36), who protested the slogan "We are all Armenian". The hijacker made the ferryboat return to Gelibolu where passengers were allowed to disembark. The hijacker, who worked at a convenience shop in Gelibolu, surrendered after holding the ferry captain hostage for 2 hours.
- On the 7th day after Hrant Dink's murder, a dance troupe organized a protest in front of Agos, where they asked passersby to lie in front of Agos in the same position as the murdered journalist, with a newspaper over their bodies. About 50 people took part, despite heavy rain. The organizers said that they were asking people to lie on the sidewalk for ten minutes and to die symbolically for a rebirth.
- Agos, whose normal circulation was about 6,000, was printed 30,000 copies, distributed nationally, and was getting ready for a re-print of its first issue since the murder of its editor-in-chief. A group of intellectuals and journalists took part in selling Agos on the streets of Istanbul.
- Turkish Minister of Foreign Affairs, Abdullah Gül declared in Davos on 28 January that a change in Article 301 was imminent as it was hindering the reform process in Turkey.
- On 1 February 2007, the private Turkish television channel TGRT, which was bought by Rupert Murdoch, broadcast video footage of the man accused of shooting Hrant Dink posing proudly behind a Turkish flag, flanked by police officers of both military and security police, allegedly filmed in the police bureau of Samsun where he was taken after his arrest. The video caused shock and consternation as commentators warned it was another sign of the growing power of Turkish ultranationalism, as the nation geared up for parliamentary and presidential elections later that year. Ismet Berkan, editor of the liberal newspaper Radikal, said that the release of the video was akin to killing Dink a second time. It proved, he claimed, "that the murderer and his associates are not alone, that their supporters ... have penetrated all segments of the state." A police spokesperson said an investigation into the video footage and its leaking was underway. Rumors of the existence of such footage had been circulating for days, but were officially denied. In an apparent act of retaliation to the broadcasting of the footage, the Turkish General Staff canceled the accreditation of Rupert Murdoch's TGRT, required for attending press events at the staff headquarters. The general director of TGRT, Murat Akgiray, and the director responsible for the broadcasting, Bahattin Apak, have resigned.
- On 4 February 2007, one hundred nationalist Turks of the National Struggle Association demonstrated on İstiklâl Avenue in Istanbul. The demonstration was seen as a reaction to the people who attended the funeral ceremony of Hrant Dink, many of whom carried banners that read "We all are Armenians", "We are all Hrant Dink." The protesters marched with Turkish flags, portraits of Mustafa Kemal Atatürk, and carried placards reading, "We all are Mustafa Kemal. We all are Turks." Among the demonstrators were children wrapped in Turkish flags, chanting nationalistic slogans.

=== Armenia and the Armenian diaspora ===
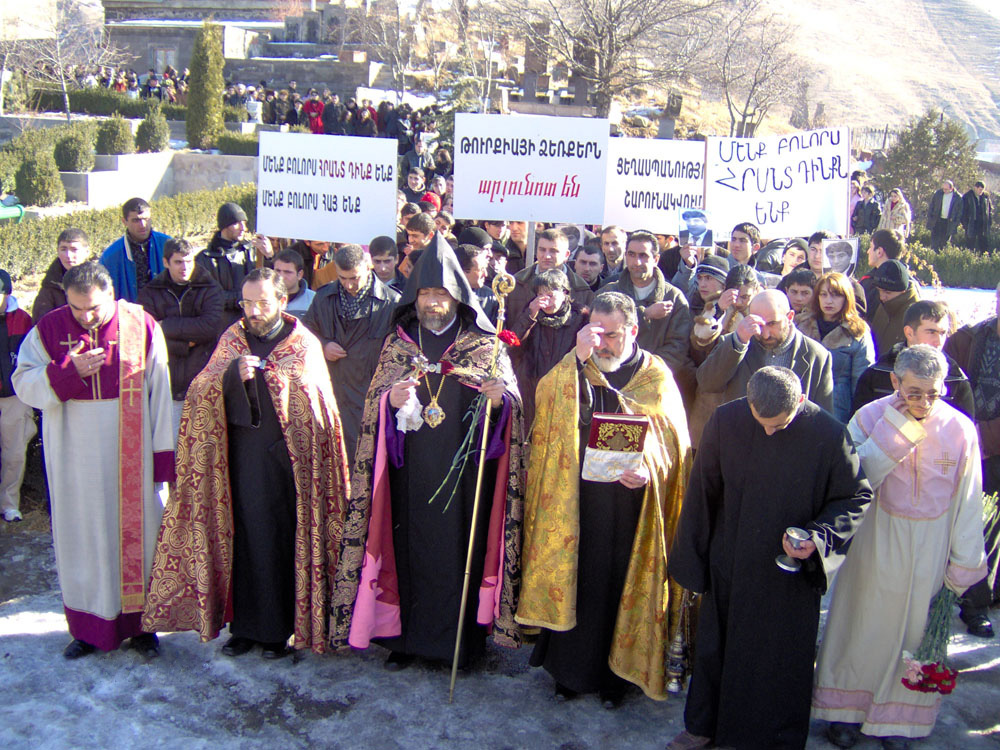
Demonstration for Hrant Dink in Vanadzor during his commemoration service led by Bishop Sebouh Chouldjian.

- Former Armenian President Robert Kocharyan: "The killing of this well-known Armenian journalist in Turkey raises numerous questions and deserves the strongest condemnation. We hope that the Turkish authorities will do everything possible to find and punish the culprit strictly in accordance with the law."
- Former Foreign Minister Vardan Oskanyan: "We are deeply shocked by the news of the assassination of Turkish Armenian journalist Hrant Dink, a man who lived his life in the belief that there can be understanding, dialogue, and peace amongst peoples. We categorically condemn this act, regardless of the circumstances, and call on the Turkish authorities indeed to do everything to identify those responsible."
- Armenian Evangelical churches worldwide held a special service of remembrance.
- There were demonstrations in cities all throughout Armenia in the aftermath of the assassination (among them Yerevan). During a demonstration in Vanadzor, residents pledged to continue Dink's work. There were demonstrations in the Armenian diaspora as well.
- Armenian Revolutionary Federation's Political Party in Armenia: "This killing once again proves the atmosphere of intolerance in Turkey even against the protection of state interests.
- Armenian Assembly of America: "The [Armenian] Assembly [...] remains deeply troubled by Ankara’s refusal to heed international calls to abolish Article 301 of the Turkish Penal Code, which stifles freedom of speech and criminalizes public discussion of the Armenian genocide. Hrant Dink himself stood trial several times for his public comments on the genocide and was convicted in October 2006 for "insulting Turkishness" under the much-criticized law. He received a six-month suspended sentence and was set to appear in court again in March 2007 for telling a foreign journalist that the events of 1915 constituted genocide."

=== International ===
==== States ====
- European Union: EU Enlargement Commissioner Olli Rehn: "I am shocked and saddened by this brutal act of violence," he said in a statement. "Hrant Dink was a respected intellectual who defended his views with conviction and contributed to an open public debate. He was a campaigner for freedom of expression in Turkey," he said.

Vice President of the Barroso Commission Günther Verheugen said in a statement to reporters during his visit in Bursa, Turkey: "I severely condemn this act. I congratulate the Turkish government for their behaviour in this issue. Because I believe that all these misdeeds intended against Turkey will ultimately fail. It is my sincere belief that Turkey will do whatever is necessary to shed light on the issue."

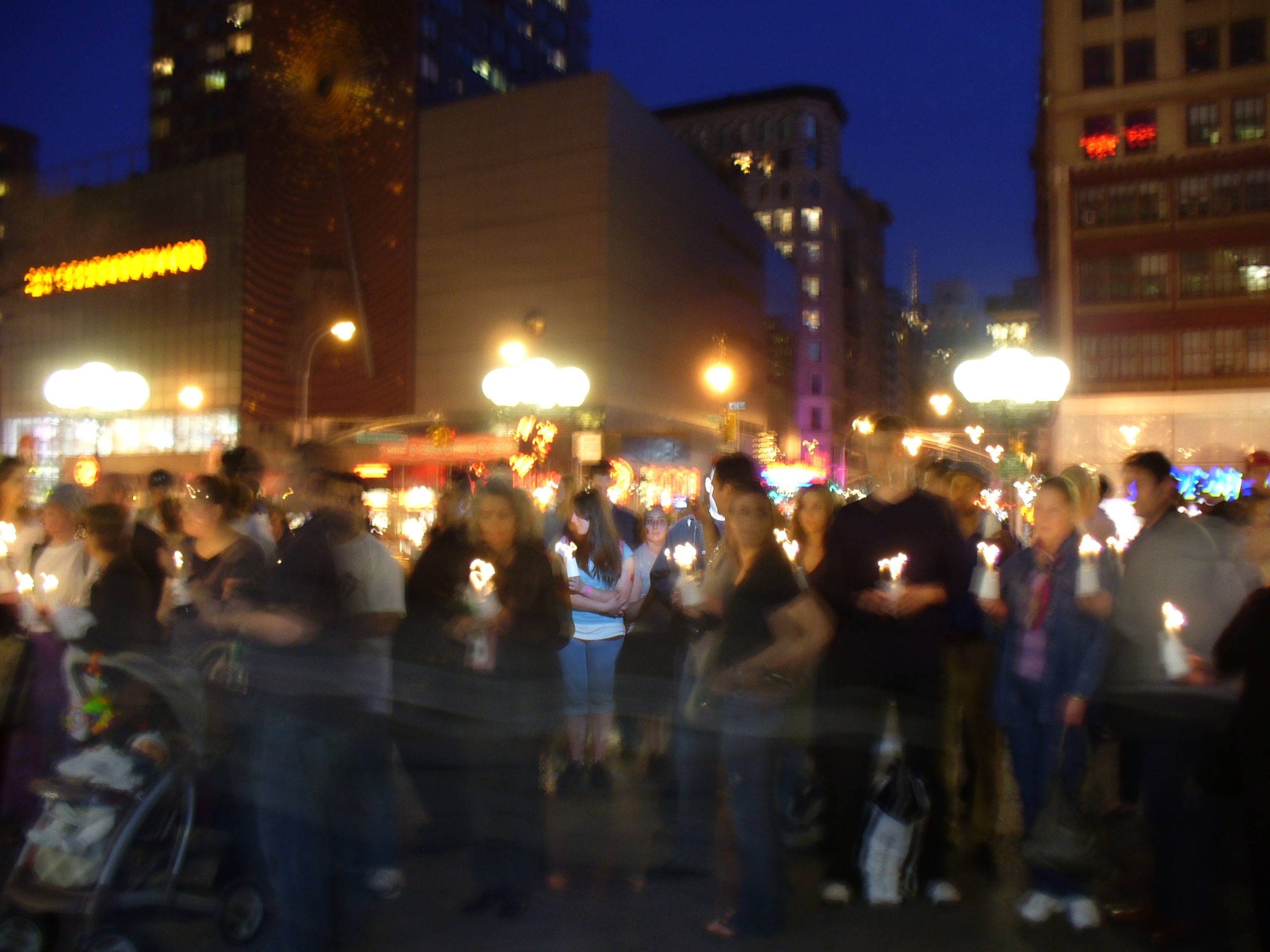
Candle Lit Vigil at Union Square, New York

- United States: The United States embassy in Ankara also offered condolences to Dink's family, saying that "we are shocked and deeply troubled to hear that Hrant Dink was killed in an armed attack today in Istanbul."
- France: French president, Jacques Chirac sent a letter to Dink's widow which said: "I can't express strongly enough how I condemn this abominable act, which deprives Turkey of one of its most courageous and free voices."
- Germany: Germany, as the EU President for 2007, condemned the murder in its official statement. "The Presidency is appalled by this abominable killing and would like to express its deepest sympathy to the victim's family and friends." reads the statement. "The Presidency is convinced that the Turkish authorities will solve this case as quickly as possible and has no doubt that Turkey will steadfastly continue along the path towards fully realizing freedom of expression," the statement says.
- Italy: Italian Premier Romano Prodi condemned the killing in Istanbul of Hrant Dink when he met his Turkish counterpart on Monday, 22 January. "It is a very serious episode on which I hope full light will be shed," Prodi said in an interview with Turkish newspaper Sabah.

==== Human rights bodies ====
- Amnesty International USA: "This horrifying assassination silences one of Turkey's bravest human rights defenders. [...] legitimate debate about ideas must be protected. The Turkish government must redouble its efforts to protect human rights defenders and open its political climate to a range of views. Recent legal reforms have brought many areas of Turkish law in line with international human rights standards, but existing limitations on free speech such as Article 301 must be repealed."
- Amnesty International (UK): "Amnesty International calls on the Turkish authorities to condemn all forms of intolerance, to uphold the rights of all citizens of the Turkish Republic and to investigate the murder of Hrant Dink thoroughly and impartially, to make the findings of the investigation public – and to bring suspected perpetrators to justice in accordance with international fair trial standards."
- Human Rights Watch: "We are deeply saddened by Hrant Dink's murder. Dink's killing robs Turkey of an important voice of conscience on the need for Turkey to come to terms with its past," said Holly Cartner, Europe and Central Asia director for Human Rights Watch.
- ARTICLE 19: "The Turkish authorities must also take a very hard look at their own role: their failure to repeal Article 301 of the Turkish Penal Code, the continuing use of this and other provisions to prosecute writers, journalists and others that dare speak out on taboo topics, and the authorities' public criticism of these voices: all of these contribute to creating an environment that legitimizes attacks on freedom of expression, including attacks of a most violent and deadly nature", said Dr. Agnès Callamard, ARTICLE 19's Executive Director.

==== Journalism organizations ====
- Reporters Without Borders: "This murder will distress and disturb all those who defend the freedom of thought and expression in Turkey and elsewhere," the press freedom organization said. "The Turkish government must weigh the extreme gravity of this crime and ensure that a thorough investigation identifies those responsible as quickly as possible."
- International Federation of Journalists: "This man has been the target of abuse and threats ever since he dared to express an opinion that challenges an established orthodoxy", said Aidan White, IFJ General Secretary. "It is scandalous that he appears to have become the victim of a culture of intolerance that remains deeply rooted in parts of society".
- International Press Institute: "This is a terrible event for Turkish press freedom. It sends the inevitable signal to all Turkish media that, if you discuss the Armenian massacre in the same terms as Dink, you face not only constant harassment from the authorities, but the possibility of assassination. [...] I think the time has now come for the government to realize that such laws have no place in a modern society. I would also hope that, following Dink’s murder, there is an open discussion about these issues leading to an agreement by all sides to consign such laws to Turkish history," said IPI Director Johann P. Fritz.
- Committee to Protect Journalists: "Through his journalism, Hrant Dink sought to shed light on Turkey’s troubled past and create a better future for Turks and Armenians. This earned him many enemies, but he vowed to continue writing despite receiving many threats," said CPJ Executive Director Joel Simon. "An assassin has now silenced one of Turkey’s most courageous voices. We are profoundly shocked and saddened by this crime, and send our deepest condolences to Hrant Dink’s family, colleagues, and friends."
- PEN American Center: "We are horrified," said Larry Siems, Director of Freedom to Write and International Programs at PEN American Center. "Hrant Dink was one of the heroes of the nonviolent movement for freedom of expression in Turkey—a movement in which writers, editors, and publishers have practiced civil disobedience by defying laws that censored or suppressed important truths in that country. Theirs is one of the most significant human rights movements of our time. Hrant Dink’s countrymen can help cement some of the gains he helped win for them by sending a strong, unified message that those responsible must be brought to justice for his murder."

== Trial ==
The Dink murder trial opened in Istanbul on 2 July 2007. 18 people were charged at Istanbul Heavy Penal Court No 14 in connection with the journalist's assassination. Since the main suspect, Ogün Samast, was younger than 18, the hearing was not public. Reportedly the defendants Yasin Hayal and Erhan Tuncel repeated their testimonies given to the security forces and prosecutor. The court decided to release the defendants Osman Altay, Irfan Özkan, Salih Hacisalihoglu and Veysel Toprak to be tried without remand and adjourned the hearing to 1 October.

The indictment demanded aggravated life imprisonment for Erhan Tuncel and Yasin Hayal for "inciting the killing of Hrant Dink". Since the alleged killer, Ogün Samast, who was younger than 18 at the time of the murder, was served a sentence between 18 and 24 years imprisonment. Yasin Hayal's brother was charged as an accessory to the crime and has to serve a sentence between 22.5 years and 35 years imprisonment. The other defendants were charged as "members or supporter of a terrorist organisation".

In January 2009 the 8th hearing was held. Seven of eight defendants under arrest attended the hearing. At the end three defendants were released and the hearing was adjourned to 20 April 2009. According to Human Rights Watch, Dink's murder trial is "a critical test of the Turkish judiciary's independence."

== Verdict of courts ==
On 25 July 2011, Ogün Samast was convicted of murder and being in illegal possession of a firearm by Istanbul's Heavy Juvenile Criminal Court. He was sentenced to 22 years and 10 months in prison, which was commuted from life sentence under Turkish juvenile law. After serving two-thirds of it, Samast will be eligible for parole in 2021 or 2022. But according to Hürryet, he won't be released as he attacked prison guards with a knife during his imprisonment and has to serve more than 4 additional years in prison.

On 16 January 2012, Istanbul's 14. Heavy Criminal Court reached a verdict with the remaining defendants. The court ruled there was no conspiracy behind the assassination, and stated that the assassination was an ordinary killing. Yasin Hayal was found guilty of murder and sentenced to life imprisonment. Hayals lawyers appealed the verdict, which later was annulled as special authority courts formerly active in the trial were dissolved by a new law which came into effect in March 2014. Hayal was condemned to 7 years and 6 months in July 2019. Two other men were convicted of assisting him and they were each sentenced to 12 years and 6 months in prison. Erhan Tuncel was initially found not guilty of Dink's murder but later captured in 2013 and subsequently condemned to 99 years imprisonment in July 2019.

Following about fourteen years of juridical proceedings, the Court in Istanbul read out a verdict on the 26 March 2021. Twenty-six defendants were sentenced due to their involvement in the environment of the assassination. Either for destroying or a forgery of an official document, being a member of an armed terrorist organization, killing by using an other person or deliberate killing with negligent act amongst other crimes. Several of the sentenced were officers from the Turkish Police Intelligence and the Turkish Ministry of the Interior. Four were sentenced to life imprisonment while two to an aggravated life imprisonment. Of all the prosecuted in the trial, thirty-seven were found not guilty.

=== ECtHR proceedings ===
In September 2010, the European Court of Human Rights found that Turkish authorities violated Dink's right to life (Article 2 ECHR) by not acting to prevent the murder and by not punishing the police for inaction.

== See also ==
- Agos
- Anti-Armenian sentiment in Turkey
- List of journalists killed in Turkey
- Attempted assassination of Pope John Paul II
- Human rights in Turkey
