= Garegin =

Garegin (Armenian: Գարեգին), also pronounced Karekin (in Western Armenian), may refer to:

== Religious figures ==
Armenian Catholicoi

- Garegin I or Karekin I (1932–1999), a Catholicos of the Armenian Apostolic Church, first as Catholicos Garegin II of the Holy See of Cilicia (1983–1994) and then as Catholicos of All Armenians Garegin I of the Mother See of Holy Etchmiadzin of the Armenian Apostolic Church (1995–1999)
- Garegin II or Karekin II (born 1951), Catholicos of All Armenians at the Mother See of Holy Etchmiadzin of the Armenian Apostolic Church
- Garegin I (Cilicia) or Karekin I (Cilicia) (1867–1952), a Catholicos of Cilicia of the Armenian Apostolic Church from 1943 to 1952

Armenian Patriarchs

- Karekin I Khachadourian of Constantinople (1880–1961), the 81st Armenian Patriarch of Constantinople
- Karekin II Kazanjian of Constantinople (1927–1998), the 83rd Armenian Patriarch of Constantinople

== Given name ==
=== Garegin ===
(Mostly used in Eastern Armenian)

- Garegin Apresov (1890–1941), Soviet Armenian diplomat, intelligence officer and Comintern worker
- Garegin Khachatryan (1975–1995), Armenian sculptor, artist and freedom fighter
- Garegin Nzhdeh (1886–1955), Armenian statesman, fedayee, political thinker, revolutionary militant leader
- Garegin Poghosyan, Armenian general
- Garegin Srvandztiants (1840–1892), Armenian philologist, folklorist, ethnographer and ecclesiastic

=== Karekin ===
(Mostly used in Western Armenian)

- Karekin Arutyunov (born 1964), Ukrainian politician
- Karekin Deveciyan (1868–1964), Turkish-Armenian zoologist
- Karekin Khajag (born 1867–1915), Armenian journalist
- Karekin Pastermadjian (1872–1923), Armenian politician
- Karekin Simonian (born 1932), Australian referee of Armenian origin
- Karekin Yarian, author and social activist from San Francisco

== See also ==
- Karekin I (disambiguation)
- Karekin II (disambiguation)
