= Hovhannes XII Arsharuni =

Armenian Patriarch of Constantinople from 1911 to 1913

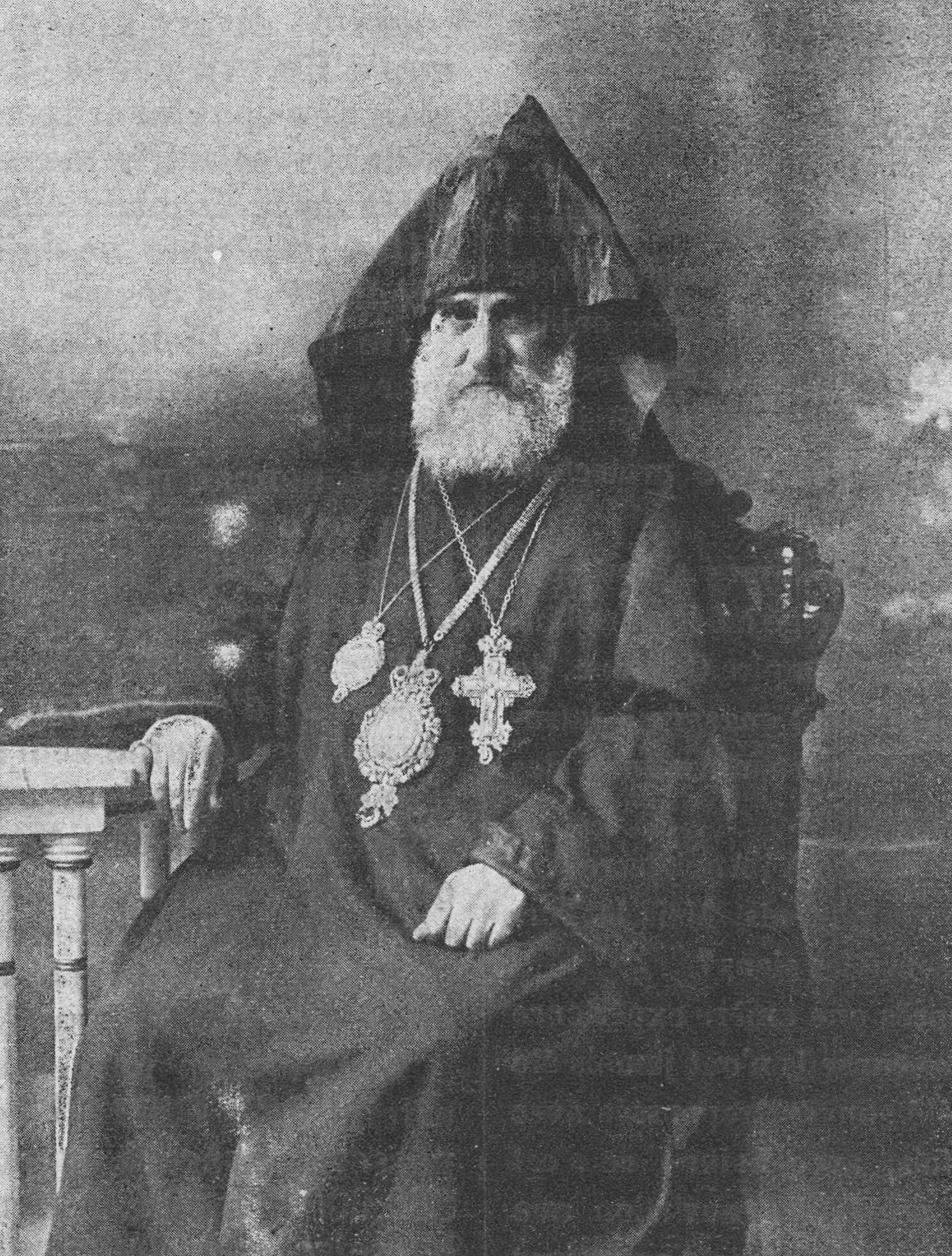

Hovhannes XII Arsharuni (Armenian: Յովհաննես Արշարունի; Istanbul, 1854 – Istanbul, 21 January 1929) was an Armenian Patriarch of Constantinople.

Born in Constantinople, Hovhannes Arsharuni attended the Galatasaray High School. He taught at the local Armenian schools and was ordained as a cleric of the Armenian church in 1879. He was ordained archbishop in 1899. He became Patriarch of Constantinople in 1911 and was forced to resign in 1913.

He died on January 21, 1929, and is buried at the Şişli Armenian Cemetery.

Religious titles
| Preceded by Yeghishe Tourian | Armenian Patriarch of Constantinople; 1911–1913 | Succeeded by Zaven Der Yeghiayan |
