= Mesrob II Mutafyan =

Armenian Patriarch of Constantinople from 1998 to 2016

His Beatitude Patriarch Mesrob II Mutafyan
- Armenian Patriarch of Constantinople
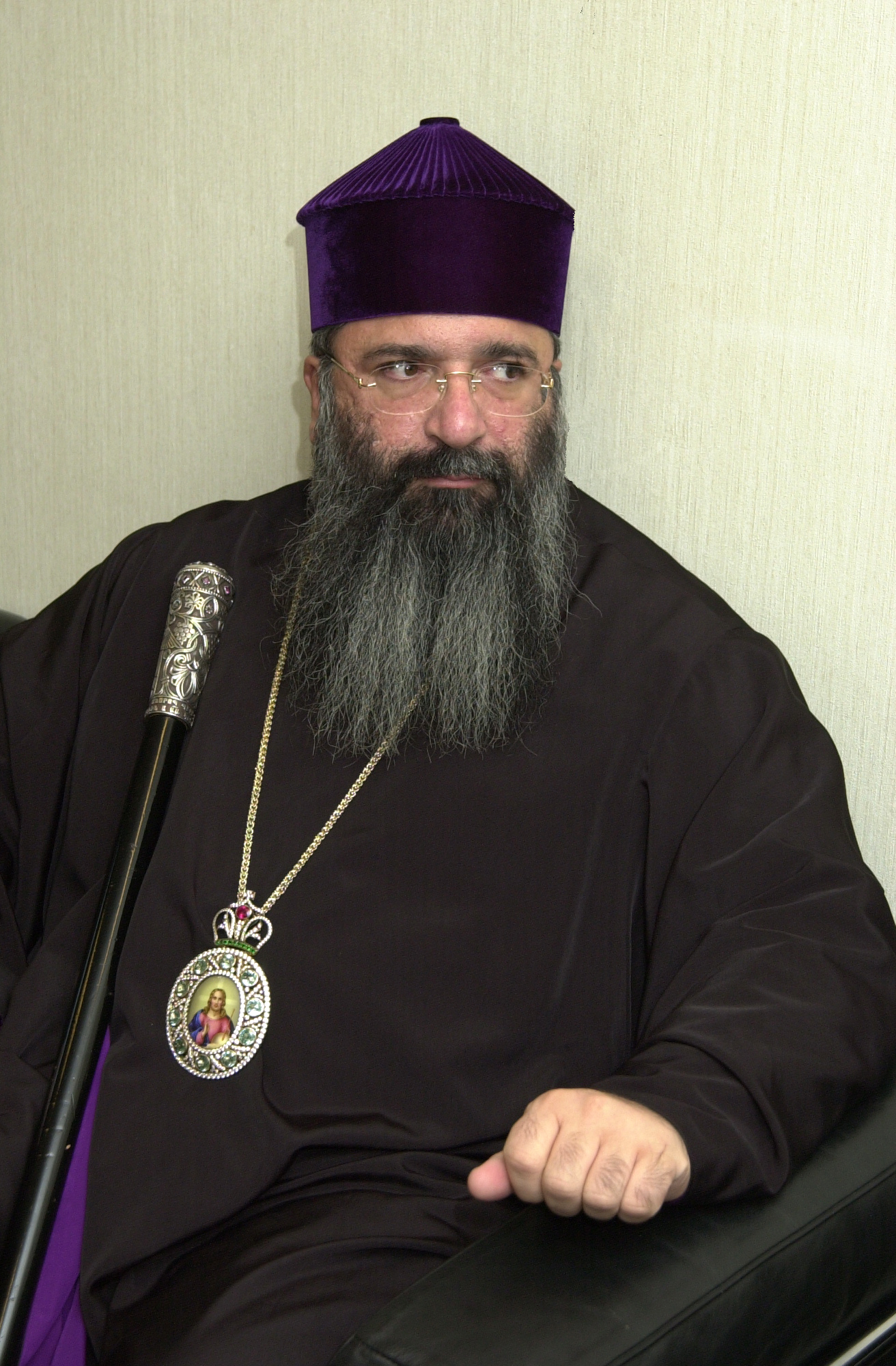
- Mesrob II Mutafyan in 2002
- Native name: Մեսրոպ Բ Մութաֆեան
- Church: Armenian Apostolic Church
- See: Armenian Patriarchate of Constantinople
- Appointed: 16 March 1998
- Term ended: 26 October 2016
- Predecessor: Karekin II Kazanjian
- Successor: Sahak II Mashalian

Personal details
- Born: 16 June 1956 Istanbul, Turkey
- Died: 8 March 2019 (aged 62) Istanbul
- Denomination: Armenian Apostolic

Archbishop Mesrob II Mutafyan (in Armenian Մեսրոպ Բ Մութաֆեան), or Mutafian, also known as Mesrop Mutafyan in Eastern Armenian transliteration (16 June 1956 – 8 March 2019), was the 84th Armenian Patriarch of Constantinople. The Armenian Patriarchate of Constantinople is one of the four Sees of Armenian Apostolic Church (the other three being Mother See of Holy Etchmiadzin, the Holy See of Cilicia and the Armenian Patriarchate of Jerusalem) and has an autocephalous status, accepting, on the other hand, spiritual supremacy of the Catholicos of Armenia and of all Armenians in Holy Echmiadzin.

== Early life ==
Mesrob Mutafyan was born Minas Mutafian in Istanbul. He graduated from the American High School in Kornwestheim near Stuttgart, Germany. From 1974 to 1979, he studied philosophy and sociology in Memphis, Tennessee, United States.

On 13 May 1979, he was ordained to priesthood taking the name Mesrob and was commissioned pastor of Kınalıada, one of the Princes' Islands in the Sea of Marmara in Istanbul with a small Armenian community. Between 1979 and 1981, he continued his theological studies in Jerusalem.

On 21 September 1986, Mesrob Mutafyan was elevated to the rank of a bishop in Echmiadzin, Armenia. From 1982 to 1990, he coordinated the ecumenical relationships of the Patriarchate. He attended the Pontifical University of St. Thomas Aquinas (Angelicum) in Rome, Italy in 1988/1989.

In 1993, he was elevated to the rank of archbishop to serve the diocese of Princes' Islands. From 1997, Mutafyan acted as the vicar general of the Armenian Patriarchate of Constantinople.

Following the death of Patriarch Karekin II Kazanjian of Constantinople, Mesrob Mutafyan was elected locum tenens on 16 March 1998 to serve as the temporary leader of the Church until an election was held. Even though the Turkish local authorities demanded Archbishop of Üsküdar Şahan Sıvaciyan, the retired longest-serving archbishop, should succeed, Mesrob Mutafyan was finally elected the 84th Armenian Patriarch of Constantinople on 14 October, 1998 and could take office. During his apostolic journey to Turkey, Pope Benedict XVI visited also the Surp Asdvadzadzin Patriarchal Church in Kumkapı, İstanbul, where he attended a religious ceremony and held later talks with Patriarch Mesrob II on 30 November 2006.

He was also a member of the Elijah Interfaith Institute Board of World Religious Leaders.

== Illness and elections for locum tenens ==
In July 2008, it was announced that Mesrob Mutafyan was suffering from Alzheimer's disease and he withdrew from all his duties and from public life; however he still officially remained patriarch and archbishop. Archbishop Aram Ateşyan ran the day-to-day affairs of the Patriarchate after being appointed Patriarchal Vicar of Constantinople with 25 of the 26 members of the synod of the patriarchate voting for him.

Archbishop Aram Ateşyan had been the Locum tenens (Pokhanort in Armenian) since 2010 because of the ill health of the patriarch. On 26 October 2016, Mesrob Mutafyan was retired by the synod of the patriarchate because of his illness which had continued for more than 7 years.

As tensions escalated leading to the resignation of the head of the synod of the patriarchate Bishop Sahak Mashalian, Karekin II, Catholicos of All Armenians summoned the lead clerics including Ateşyan, Mashalian and Bekdjian from Istanbul to Etchmiadzin for a mediated solution in February 2017. The decision was taken to hold elections for a Locum Tenens on 15 March, followed by a patriarchal election within six months.

On 15 March 2017, the synod elected Archbishop Karekin Bekdjian, the Primate of the Armenian Church Diocese of Germany as Locum tenens or Patriarchal alternate (Deghabah). But Archbishop Ateşyan refused to step down after the election of Bekdjian.

== Death ==
He died on 8 March 2019 at the Surp Pirgic hospital in Istanbul, from Pick’s disease. Bishop Sahak Mashalian was elected as his successor.

As a sign of respect Patriarch Abba Seraphim directed the British Orthodox Church to observe forty days of mourning.

Oriental Orthodox titles
Preceded by Karekin II Kazanjian	Armenian Patriarch of Constantinople; 1998–2016	Succeeded by Sahak II Mashalian
