= Karekin I (disambiguation) =

Karekin I may refer to:

- Karekin I (Cilicia) (1867–1952), of the Holy See of Cilicia (1943–1952)
- Karekin I Khachadourian of Constantinople, 81st Armenian Patriarch of Constantinople in 1951–1961
- Karekin I (Karekin I Sarkissian) (1932–1999), Supreme Patriarch and Catholicos of All Armenians of Mother See of Holy Etchmiadzin (1995–1999), earlier Karekin II Catholicos of the Holy See of Cilicia (1983–1994)

== See also ==
- Garegin (disambiguation) / Karekin (disambiguation)
- Karekin II (disambiguation)
