= Karekin II (disambiguation) =

Karekin II may refer to:

- Karekin II Kazanjian of Constantinople (1927–1998), the 83rd Armenian Patriarch of Constantinople
- Karekin II (Karekin I Sarkissian) (1932–1999), Catholicos of Cilicia and later, as Karekin I, Patriarch and Catholicos of All Armenians
- Karekin II (Karekin II Nersessian) (born 1951), current Patriarch and Catholicos of All Armenians

== See also ==
- Garegin (disambiguation) / Karekin (disambiguation)
- Karekin I (disambiguation)
