= Mesrob I Naroyan =

Armenian Patriarch of Constantinople from 1927 to 1944

Archbishop Mesrob I Naroyan (in Armenian Մեսրոպ Նարոյեան) (1875 – 30 May 1944) was the 80th Armenian Patriarch of Constantinople under the authority of the Catholicos of Armenia and of all Armenians. He was elected to the position in 1927 and served for 16 years as Patriarch until his death. He was the first clergyman elected Armenian patriarch in the independent Republic of Turkey.

Religious titles
Preceded by Zaven I Der Yeghiayan	Armenian Patriarch of Constantinople; 1927–1944	Succeeded by Karekin I Khachadourian
