= Shenork I Kaloustian =

Armenian Patriarch of Constantinople from 1961 to 1990

Archbishop Shenork I Kaloustian (in Armenian Շնորհք Գալուստեան) (27 September 1913, Yozgat, Turkey – 7 March 1990, Armenia) was the 82nd Armenian Patriarch of Constantinople under the authority of the Catholicos of Armenia and of all Armenians.

Arshak Kaloustian was sent to attend school at the American missionary orphanage after he lost his father due to the Armenian genocide when he was two years old. His mother was forced to remarry an ethnic Turk and convert to Islam. He became a deacon of the Armenian apostolic church in 1932, was ordained a priest (taking the name Shenork) in 1936 and bishop in October 1955. He was elected as the Patriarch of Constantinople in 1961.

Because of his personal family history he had extensive relations to the Crypto-Armenians (Armenian converts to Islam) and at the reunion of Armenians in Jerusalem in 1980, he claimed that there live about 1 million Crypto Armenians in Turkey. During his lifetime, he attended many seminaries in several countries and was a pastor in the United States as well as in the United Kingdom.

He died in Nork Hospital in Yerevan in Soviet Armenia in 1990 after a fall during a visit to the church headquarters at Echmiadzin.

Religious titles
Preceded by Karekin I Khachadourian	Armenian Patriarch of Constantinople; 1961–1990	Succeeded by Karekin II Kazanjian
