= Karekin II Kazanjian =

Armenian Patriarch of Constantinople from 1990 to 1998

Archbishop Karekin II Kazanjian, (Armenian: Գարեգին Բ Գազանճյան; May 18, 1927, Istanbul, Turkey – March 10, 1998 Istanbul) was the 83rd Armenian Patriarch of Constantinople under the authority of the Catholicos of Armenia and of all Armenians.

== Life ==
Archbishop Karekin was born Petros Kazancıyan in 1927 in Istanbul. Young Petros attended Levon Vartuhiyan School in Topkapı, İstanbul and then the Bezaziyan and Getronagan schools. In October 1940 he was accepted as a seminarian in the Patriarchal Seminary of the St. James Brotherhood in Jerusalem.

In 1945 he was ordained a deacon and on January 22, 1950, he was elevated to the priesthood by Archbishop Mampre Sirounian, the Primate of Egypt.

From 1946 to 1949, Father Karekin was the Assistant Dean of the Seminary of Jerusalem; he also taught at the Seminary as well as at the Tarkmançats School until 1951. For two years, he was the Chancellor of the Holy See of Jerusalem, the second Chairman of the General Assembly of the Brotherhood, and also a member of the Executive Council.

Responding to an invitation by Archbishop Karekin Khachadourian, Patriarch of the Armenians in Turkey, Father Karekin returned to Istanbul in December 1951 to accept the position of Dean of the planned Holy Cross Seminary. Until the formal opening of the Seminary, which took place in January 1954, he taught at the Getronagan and Bezjian secondary schools and served as the Dean of classes for the preparation of priests at the Patriarchate. On the day of the opening of the Holy Cross Seminary, he received the rank of Dzayrakuyn Vartabed, supreme doctorate of Christian dogma, from Patriarch Karekin I. At this institution, he continued to teach classical and modern Armenian literature and served as Dean until July 1959.

In December 1959, he went to the United States and accepted the position of pastor of St. Mary Church in Washington, D.C.

On October 24, 1966 he was ordained Bishop by Catholicos Vazken I, Supreme Patriarch and Catholicos of All Armenians.

From the Washington, DC parish he went to Australia as the first primate of that newly established diocese, where he presided until March 1981, when he was elected to the position of Grand Sacristan of the Brotherhood of St. James in Jerusalem.

Bishop Karekin's thesis for the rank of Vartabedutyun was "Four Minor Prophets", which was published in the 1950–1951 issues of the monthly Sion, the official newsletter of the Armenian Patriarchate of Jerusalem. His thesis for the rank of Dzayrakooyn Vartabed, was "The Encyclicals of St. Nersess Shnorhali", which he translated into modern Armenian with commentary. Bishop Karekin published religious and literary articles in several journals such as Dziadzan, Sion, Hayasdanyayts Yegeghetsi, Nor Ashkharh, and Marmara.

Through his efforts, an Armenian church was built in Washington, D.C. in 1962.

Bishop Karekin was also instrumental in the construction of a new church in Sydney, Australia in 1972 and in Melbourne in 1976. During his tenure of office, a building was purchased in Sydney to serve as headquarters of the Diocese of Australia. He exerted much effort to alleviate the mortgage on these buildings.

From 1981 to September 5, 1990, he was the Grand Sacristan of the Holy See of Jerusalem. Since 1981 he was elected to serve on a committee that audited the finances of the Monastery and with three other people he was in charge of the possessions of the Monastery. During that time he also taught the senior students of the Seminary.

Archbishop Karekin Kazancıyan was elevated to the position of Armenian Patriarch of Constantinople in September 1990.

== Death ==
On March 10, 1998, Archbishop Karekin Kazancıyan died at the Surp Pırgıç (Holy Saviour) Armenian hospital in Istanbul. He was 70 years of age.

Oriental Orthodox titles
Preceded by Shenork I Kaloustian	Armenian Patriarch of Constantinople; 1990–1998	Succeeded by Mesrob II Mutafyan
