= Zaven I Der Yeghiayan =

Armenian Patriarch of Constantinople from 1913 to 1922

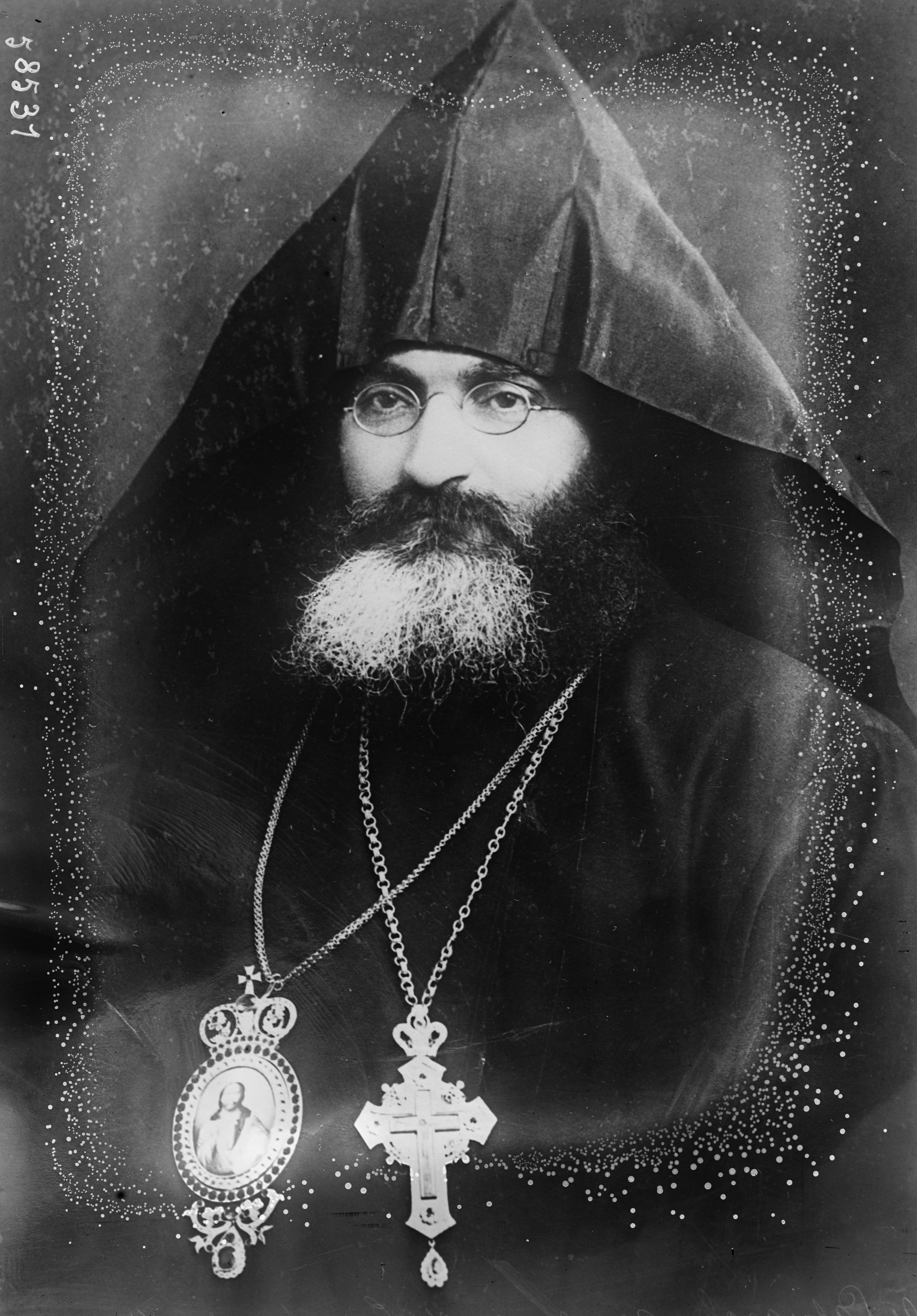
Zaven Der Yeghiayan (1920).

Zaven Der Yeghiayan (Զաւէն Տէր Եղիայեան; 8 September 1868 in Mosul, Ottoman Iraq – 4 June 1947 in Baghdad, Iraq) was Armenian Patriarch of Constantinople in 1913–22. He was deported to Mosul during the Armenian genocide.

== Life ==
Zaven Der-Yeghiayan received his primary education in Baghdad and continued his studies at the Armash Theological Seminary. He became bishop and then prelate for Diyarbakir. He became patriarch of Constantinople in 1913. The Ottoman government exiled him to Baghdad in 1916. In 1926, Zaven became director plenipotentiary of the Melkonian Institute in Cyprus. In 1927, he moved back to Baghdad. He is the author of My Patriarchal Memoirs. This memoir gives readers a detailed eyewitness account of the Armenian genocide and attempts by the Patriarch himself to stop it.

== See also ==
- Witnesses and testimonies of the Armenian genocide

Religious titles
Preceded by Hovhannes Arsharouni	Armenian Patriarch of Constantinople; 1913–1922	Succeeded by Mesrob I Naroyan
