= Yasin Hayal =

Turkish criminal (born 1980)

Yasin Hayal (born 1981) is a Turkish criminal who was sentenced to a life sentence for inciting the assassination of Turkish Armenian journalist Hrant Dink. He has served a ten-month prison term for bombing a McDonald's restaurant in the city of Trabzon, Turkey. He has been on trial for inciting Ogün Samast to assassinate Turkish Armenian journalist Hrant Dink. On January 16, 2012, Hayal was found guilty of soliciting Dink's murder by a Turkish court and sentenced to life imprisonment. The ruling was later abolished, and in a new trial Hayal was sentenced to 7 and a half years imprisonment in July 2019, this time for being in charge of an armed group.

Yasin Hayal is a former member of the Turkish ultra-nationalist Great Union Party (BBP), of which he was expelled before the assassination of Dink.

== Murder of Hrant Dink ==
Hayal is connected to the murder of journalist Hrant Dink on January 19, 2007, by giving the murderer, Ogün Samast, the idea and supplying him with a weapon and money. Hrant Dink, the editor-in-chief of the bilingual Turkish-Armenian newspaper Agos, was killed on January 19, 2007, in front of the Agos office in Istanbul by gunshots, fired from behind in broad daylight.

Another instigator of the murder, Erhan Tuncel, allegedly informed police officer Muhittin Zenit of the attack in advance. Zenit could not have apprehended Hayal due to orders from the Trabzon police department.

Initially, Hayal claimed innocence, citing absence; however, telephone records proved that he was in Istanbul on the day of the assassination. His attorney was Fuat Turgut, who is suspected of membership in a militant organization called Ergenekon. The Great Union Party financed his court expenses; however, its leader, Muhsin Yazıcıoğlu, adamantly denied any connection between his party and Ergenekon.

Orhan Pamuk, watch your step! Watch your step!

— Hayal's departing advice to Orhan Pamuk, before being taken into police custody.

During his last trial, Hayal harassed Dink's wife, Rakel.

In August 2008, his brother, Osman Hayal, was taken into custody for incitement. In October, Osman was indicted by prosecutors Selim Berna Altay and Fikret Seçen for abetment, because he was allegedly in Istanbul when the crime took place. The charge carries a penalty of 22.5–35 years.

== McDonald's incident ==
Hayal bombed a McDonald's branch in Trabzon on 24 October 2004. He left the scene without his jacket, his leg injured. His mother, Huri, said that Yasin left home on 24 October after the noon prayer and returned at night. The next day, he left around the same time at noon, once again returning in the evening to break the Ramadan fast. However, he left home after dinner, telling his parents he would spend the night with a friend in college. The police did not question Hayal's family for some time.

He was sentenced to 6 years and 8 months in prison.

He was retried on 23 September 2008, after a higher court decided that the penalty for his six victims should be cumulative. He did not attend his trial, so his written statement will be obtained from his residence in Tekirdağ prison.

== Other incidents ==
He assaulted a missionary priest on March 18, 2002, in Trabzon.

== See also ==
- Mehmet Ali Ağca
