= Sahak II Mashalian =

Armenian Patriarch of Constantinople since 2019

His Beatitude Patriarch Sahak II Mashalian
- Armenian Patriarch of Constantinople
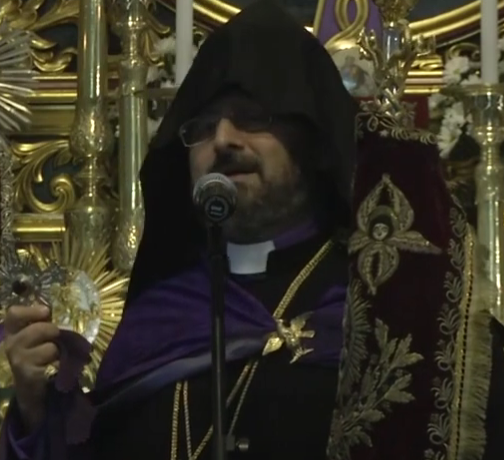
- Native name: Սահակ Բ. Մաշալեան; II. Sahag Maşalyan
- Church: Armenian Apostolic Church
- See: Armenian Patriarchate of Constantinople
- Elected: 11 December 2019
- Predecessor: Mesrob II Mutafyan

Personal details
- Born: 17 March 1962 (age 64) Istanbul, Turkey
- Denomination: Oriental Orthodox

Archbishop Sahag II Mashalian (Western Armenian: Սահակ Բ․ Մաշալեան, Turkish: II. Sahag Maşalyan), also known as Sahak Mashalyan in Eastern Armenian transliteration (born 17 March 1962) became the 85th Armenian Patriarch of Constantinople in 2019. The Armenian Patriarchate of Constantinople is one of the four Sees of Armenian Apostolic Church (the other three being the Mother See of Holy Etchmiadzin, the Holy See of Cilicia and the Armenian Patriarchate of Jerusalem) and has an autocephalous status, accepting, on the other hand, spiritual supremacy of the Catholicos of Armenia and of all Armenians in Holy Echmiadzin.

Patriarch Sahak II was born as Shahan Mashalian in Istanbul, Turkey on 17 March 1962, to a family from the Armenian Highlands in today's Eastern Anatolia from which only a part survived the Armenian Genocide beginning in 1915.

During the patriarchal election, the Turkish government banned candidates from abroad. Therefore, only two candidates participated in the elections (Mashalian and Archbishop Aram Ateshyan) both of whom were considered close to the Turkish government. The new Armenian Patriarch of Istanbul criticized the US Senate recognition of the Armenian Genocide although he himself hails from a family of Armenian Genocide survivors.

Oriental Orthodox titles
Preceded by Mesrob II Mutafyan	Armenian Patriarch of Constantinople; 2019–present	Incumbent
