= List of Armenian patriarchs of Constantinople =

The list of Armenian patriarchs of Constantinople presents the holders of the office of Armenian Patriarch of Constantinople, the head of the Armenian Patriarchate of Constantinople from its establishment in 1461 to the present day.

- Hovakim I of Constantinople (1461–1478) -- Յովակիմ Պրուսացի
- Nigoghayos I of Constantinople (1478–1489) -- Նիկողայոս
- Garabed I of Constantinople (1489–1509) -- Կարապետ
- Mardiros I of Constantinople (1509–1526) -- Մարտիրոս
- Krikor I of Constantinople (1526–1537) -- Գրիգոր Ա
- Astvadzadur I of Constantinople (1537–1550) -- Աստուածատուր Ա
- Stepanos I of Constantinople (1550–1560) -- Ստեփանոս Ա
- Diradur I of Constantinople (1561–1563) -- Տիրատուր Ա Սսեցի
- Hagop I of Constantinople (1563–1573) -- Յակոբ Ա
- Hovhannes I of Constantinople (1573–1581) -- Յովհաննէս Ա Տիարպեքիրցի
- Tovmas I of Constantinople (1581–1587) -- Թովմաս Գաղատիոյ
- Sarkis I of Constantinople (1587–1590) -- Սարգիս Ա Ուլնիոյ
- Hovhannes II of Constantinople (1590–1591) -- Յովհաննէս Բ
- Azaria I of Constantinople (1591–1592) -- Ազարիա Ա Ջուղայեցի
- Sarkis II of Constantinople (1592–1596) -- Սարգիս Բ Պարոն-Տեր Զեթունցի
  - Diradur I of Constantinople (1596–1599), restored -- Տիրատուր Ա Սսեցի
- Melkisetek I of Constantinople (1599–1600) -- Մելքիսեդեք Ա Գառնեցի
- Hovhannes III of Constantinople (1600–1601) -- Յովհաննէս Գ Խուլ Կոստանդնուպոլսեցի
- Krikor II of Constantinople (1601–1608) -- Գրիգոր Բ Կեսարացի
  - vacant (1608–1611)
  - Krikor II of Constantinople (1611–1621), restored 1st time -- Գրիգոր Բ Կեսարացի
  - Hovhannes III (1621–1623), restored 1st time -- Յովհաննէս Գ Խուլ Կոստանդնուպոլսեցի
  - Krikor II (1623–1626), restored 2nd time -- Գրիգոր Բ Կեսարացի
- Zakaria I of Constantinople (1636–1639) -- Զաքարիա Ա Վանեցի
  - Hovhannes III (1631–1636), restored 2nd time -- Հովհաննես Գ Խուլ Կոստանդնուպոլսեցի
  - Zakaria I (1636–1639), restored -- Զաքարիա Ա Վանեցի
- Tavit I of Constantinople (1639–1641) -- Դաւիթ Ա Արևելցի
- Giragos I of Constantinople (1641–1642) -- Կիրակոս Ա Երեւանցի
- Khachatur I of Constantinople (1642–1643) -- Խաչատուր Ա Սեբաստացի
  - Tavit I (1643–1644), restored 1st time -- Դաւիթ Ա Արեւելցի
- Tovmas II of Constantinople (1644) -- Թովմաս Բ Բերիացի
  - Tavit I (1644–1649), restored 2nd time -- Դաւիթ Ա Արեւելցի
  - Tavit I (1650–1651), restored 3rd time -- Դաւիթ Ա Արեւելցի
- Yegiazar I of Constantinople (1651–1652) -- Եղիազար Ա Այնթապցի
- Hovhannes IV of Constantinople (1652–1655) -- Յովհաննէս Դ Մուղնեցի
  - vacant (1655–1657)
  - Tovmas II (1657–1659), restored -- Թովմաս Բ Բերիացի
- Mardiros II of Constantinople (1659–1660) -- Մարտիրոս Բ Քեֆեցի
- Ghazar I of Constantinople (1660–1663) -- Ղազար Ա Սեբաստացի
- Hovhannes V of Constantinople (1663–1664) -- Հովհաննես Ե Թութունճի
- Sarkis III of Constantinople (1664–1665) -- Սարգիս Գ Թեքիրտաղցի
  - Hovhannes V (1665–1667), restored -- Յովհաննէս Ե Թութունճի
  - Sarkis III (1667–1670), restored -- Սարգիս Գ Թեքիրտաղցի
- Stepanos II of Constantinople (1670–1674) -- Ստեփանոս Բ Մեղրեցի
- Hovhannes VI of Constantinople (1674–1675) -- Հովհաննես Զ Ամասիացի
- Andreas I of Constantinople (1673–1676) -- Անդրէաս Ստամպոլցի
- Garabed II of Constantinople (1676–1679) -- Կարապետ Բ Կեսարացի
- Sarkis IV of Constantinople (1679–1680) -- Սարգիս Դ Էքմեքճի
  - Garabed II (1680–1681), restored first time -- Կարապետ Բ Կեսարացի
- Toros I of Constantinople (1681) -- Թորոս Ա Ստամպոլցի
  - Garabed II (1681–1684), restored second time -- Կարապետ Բ Կեսարացի
- Yeprem I of Constantinople (1684–1686) -- Եփրեմ Ա Ղափանցի
  - Garabed II (1686–1687), restored third time -- Կարապետ Բ Կեսարացի
  - Toros I (1687–1688), restored -- Թորոս Ա Ստամպոլցի
- Khachatur II of Constantinople (1688) -- Խաչատուր Բ Ճլեցի
  - Garabed II (1688–1689), restored fourth time -- Կարապետ Բ Կեսարացի
  - vacant (1689–1692)
- Matteos I of Constantinople (1692–1694) -- Մատթէոս Ա Կեսարացի
  - Yeprem I (1694–1698), restored first time -- Եփրեմ Ա Ղափանցի
- Melkisetek II of Constantinople (1698–1699) -- Մելքիսեդեկ Բ Սուպհի
- Mkhitar I of Constantinople (1699–1700) -- Մխիթար Ա Քիւրտիստանցի
  - Melkisetek II (1700–1701), restored -- Մելքիսեդեկ Բ Սուպհի
  - Yeprem I (1701–1702), restored second time -- Եփրեմ Ա Ղափանցի
- Avedik I of Constantinople (1702–1703) -- Աւետիք Եվդոկիացի
- Kalust Gaydzag I (1703–1704) -- Գալուստ Կայծակն Ա Ամասիացի
- Nerses I of Constantinople (1704) -- Ներսէս Ա Պալաթցի
  - Avedik I (1704–1706), restored -- Աւետիք Եվդոկիացի
- Mardiros III of Constantinople (1706) -- Մարտիրոս Գ Երզնկացի
- Mickael I of Constantinople (1706–1707) -- Միքայել Խարբերդցի
- Sahag I of Constantinople (1707) -- Սահակ Ապուչեխցի
- Hovhannes VII of Constantinople (1707–1708) -- Յովհաննէս Է Իզմիրցի
  - Sahag I (1708–1714), restored -- Սահակ Ապուչեխցի
- Hovhannes VIII of Constantinople (1714–1715) -- Յովհաննէս Ը Գանձակեցի
- Hovhannes IX of Constantinople (1715–1741) -- Յովհաննէս Թ Կոլոտ Բաղիշեցի
- Hagop II of Constantinople (1741–1749) -- Յակոբ Բ Նալեան Զմմարացի
- Brokhoron I of Constantinople (1749) -- Պրոխորոն Սիլիստրեցի
- Minas I of Constantinople (1749–1751) -- Մինաս Ա Ակներցի
- Kevork I of Constantinople (1751–1752) -- Գևորգ Ա Ղափանցի
  - Hagop II (1752–1764), restored -- Յակոբ Բ Նալեան Զմմարացի
- Krikor III of Constantinople (1764–1773) -- Գրիգոր Գ Պասմաճեան Կոստանդնուպոլսեցի
- Zakaria II of Constantinople (1773–1781) -- Զաքարիա Բ Փոքուզեան Կաղզվանցի
- Hovhannes X of Constantinople (1781–1782) -- Յովհաննէս Ժ Համատանցի
  - Zakaria II (1782–1799), restored -- Զաքարիա Բ Փոքուզյան Կաղզվանցի
- Taniel I of Constantinople (1799–1800) -- Դանիել Սուրմառեցի
- Hovhannes XI of Constantinople (1800–1801) -- Յովհաննէս ԺԱ Չամաշըրճեան Բաբերդցի
- Krikor IV of Constantinople (1801–1802) -- Գրիգոր Դ Խամսեցի
  - Hovhannes XI (1802–1813), restored -- Յովհաննէս ԺԱ Չամաշըրճյան Բաբերդցի
- Abraham I of Constantinople (1813–1815) -- Աբրահամ Ա Գոլյան Տաթևացի
- Boghos I of Constantinople (1815–1823) -- Պօղոս Ա Գրիգորյան Ադրիանուպոլսեցի
- Garabet III of Constantinople (1823–1831) -- Կարապետ Գ Պալաթցի
- Stepanos III of Constantinople (1831–1839) -- Ստեփանոս Բ Աղավնի Զաքարեան
- Hagopos III of Constantinople (1839–1840) -- Յակոբոս Գ Սերոբեան
  - Stepanos III (1840–1841), restored -- Ստեփանոս Բ Աղավնի Զաքարեան
- Astvadzadur II of Constantinople (1841–1844) -- Աստուածատուր Բ Կոստանդնուպոլսեցի
- Matteos II of Constantinople (1844–1848) -- Մատթէոս Բ Չուխաճեան Կոստանդնուպոլսեցի
  - Hagopos III (1848–1856), restored -- Յակոբոս Գ Սերոբեան
- Kevork II of Constantinople (1856–1860) -- Գէորգ Բ Քերեսթեճեան Կոստանդնուպոլսեցի
- Sarkis V of Constantinople (1860–1861) -- Սարգիս Ե Գույումճեան Ադրիանուպոլսեցի
  - Vacant (1861-1863) with Stepan Maghakyan as locum tenens Ստեփան Մաղաքեան (տեղապահ)
- Boghos II of Brusa (1863–1869) -- Պօղոս Բ Թագթագեան Պրուսացի
- Ignadios I of Constantinople (1869) -- Իգնատիոս Ա Գագմաճեան Կոստանդնուպոլսեցի
- Mkrtich I Khrimian of Van (1869–1873) -- Մկրտիչ Վանեցի Խրիմեան - (later Mkrtich I Khrimian, Catholicos of All Armenians (1892–1907)
- Nerses II of Constantinople (1874–1884) -- Ներսէս Բ Վարժապետեան Կոստանդնուպոլսեցի
- Harootiun I (1885–1888) -- Յարութիւն Ա Վեհապետեան
- Khoren I of Constantinople (1888–1894) -- Խորեն Ա Աշըգեան
- Matteos III of Constantinople (1894–1896) -- Մատթէոս Գ Իզմիրլեան Կոստանդնուպոլսեցի - dethroned in 1896 by the Ottoman authorities and exiled to Jerusalem
- Maghakia Ormanian (1896–1908) -- Մաղաքիա Օրմանեան Կոստանդնուպոլսեցի
  - Matteos III of Constantinople (1908–1908) -- Մատթէոս Գ Իզմիրլեան Կոստանդնուպոլսեցի - returned from exile and restored as Patriarch - same year elected as Matthew II, Catholicos of All Armenians (1908–1910)
- Yeghische Tourian (1909–1910) -- Եղիշէ Դուրեան Կոստանդնուպոլսեցի
- Hovhannes Arscharouni (1911–1913) -- Յովհաննէս Արշարունի Իսթանպուլցի
- Zaven I Der Yeghiayan (1913–1915) for first time -- Զաւէն Եղիաեան Պաղտատցի
  - vacant (1915–1919) (period of delegation of powers) փոխանորդության շրջան
  - Zaven I Der Yeghiayan (1919–1922) for second time -- Զաւէն Եղիաեան Պաղտատցի
  - vacant (1922–1927) Locum tenens period - Տեղապահության շրջան
- Mesrob I Naroyan (1927–1944) -- Մեսրոպ Ա Նարոեան Մշեցի
  - vacant (1944–1951) Locum tenens period - Տեղապահության շրջան
- Karekin I Khachadourian (1951–1961) -- Գարեգին Ա Խաչատուրեան Տրապիզոնցի
  - vacant (1961–1963) Locum tenens period - Տեղապահության շրջան
- Shenork I Kaloustian (1963–1990) -- Շնորհք Ա Գալուստեան Եոզկատցի
- Karekin II Kazanjian (1990–1998) -- Գարեգին Բ Գազանճեան
- Mesrob II Mutafian (1998–2016) -- Մեսրոպ Բ Մութաֆեան
  - vacant (2016-2019)
  - Archbishop Aram Ateşyan, Locum tenens (2010-2017) because of the Patriarch's state of health. Patriarch Mutafian was retired by the synod in 2016.
  - Archbishop Karekin Bekdjian, Locum tenens (starting March 15, 2017)
  - Bishop Sahak Mashalian, Locum tenens (starting 4 July 2019 until 11 December 2019)
- Sahak II Mashalian (11 December 2019–present) -- Սահակ Բ Մաշալեան

== See also ==
- Catholicoi of Armenia
- Armenian Catholicoi of Cilicia
- Armenian Patriarchs of Jerusalem
- Armenian Catholic Patriarchs
- Catholicos of Armenia
