= Karekin Simonian =

Iraqi-born Australian referee (1932–2019)

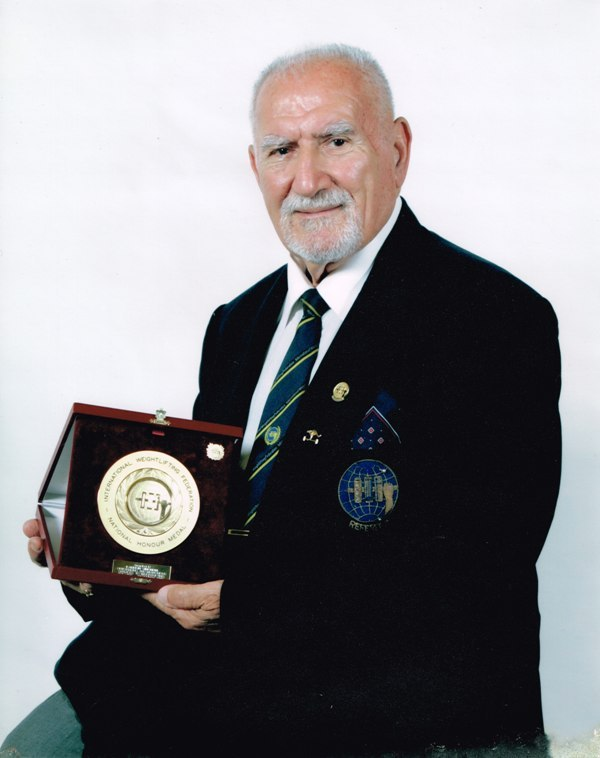

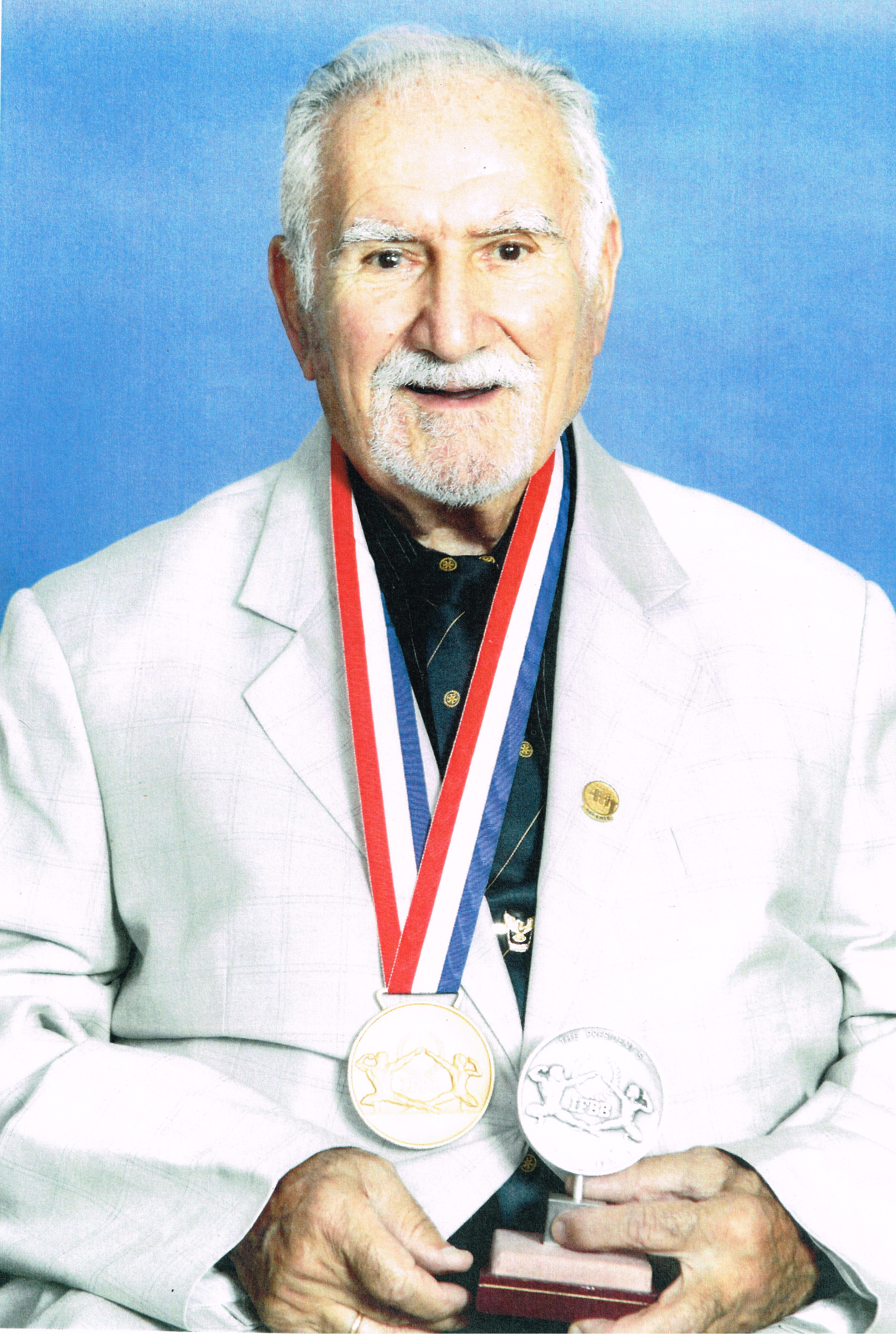

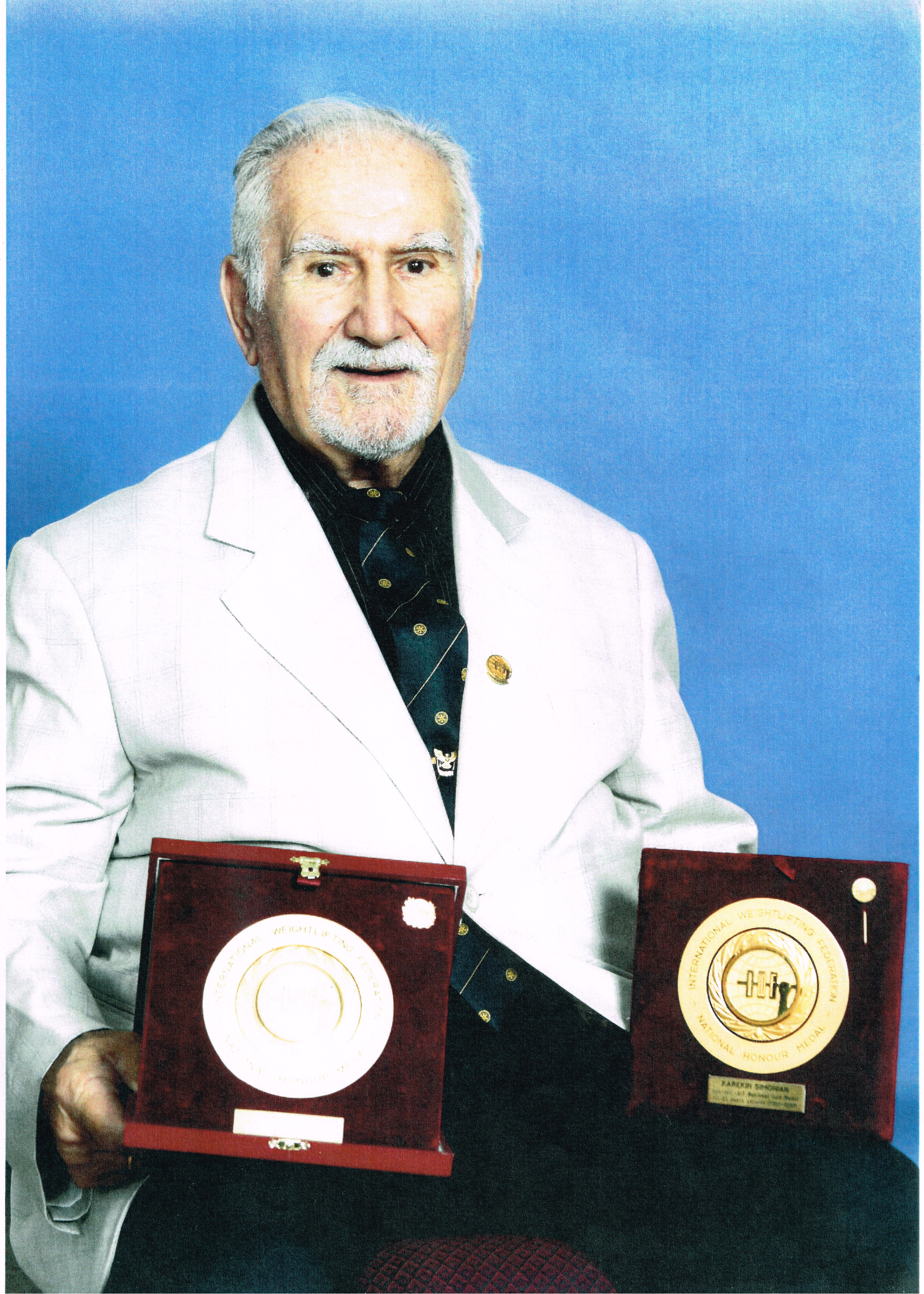

Karekin Simonian (Armenian: Գարեգին Սիմոնյան; 13 July 1932 – 17 April 2019) was Iraqi-born Armenian- Australian internationally recognised referee in Olympic weightlifting and bodybuilding. He was an I.F.B.B. reporter for 50 years.

== Life and career ==
Simonian was born in Kirkuk, Iraq on 13 July 1932 to an Armenian family.

He was a Recognized International Olympic and Paralympics Committee Referee, and a Sponsor to NSW Weightlifting Team (Australia), as well as a Committee Member of the Australian and NSW Weightlifting Federation/Association (AWF, NSWWA). He coached a team of young athletes in Sydney, and refereed in many Australian national and international games from 2000 until 2012, after which he moved to the United States, but kept his ties with the Australian AWF and NSWWA community. He also supported and worked as a committee member of the PCYC (Police Citizens Youth Club) in Burwood, Sydney-Australia, which aimed to develop skills, character and leadership in young people, and introduced them to sports and other activities

For more than 50 years, Simonian dedicated his time and expertise to the betterment of sports in Iraq (where he was considered the godfather of bodybuilding and weightlifting), the Middle East, Australia, Armenia, the United States of America and Canada, and volunteered at the Sydney Olympics 2000 on the weight lifting team.

In 2000, The Australian Olympic Committee (AOC) invited Simonian, to participate and support the 2000 Olympic Games, for the sport of weightlifting. There he refereed, and assisted the athletes, coaches and managers from around the world during the Olympic and Paralympics Games. He was also on the Paralympics Committee.

Beside his career in sports, he held a mechanical engineering degree from the London College of Mechanical Engineering by correspondence, and completed a technical mechanical course from Mercedes-Benz Schulung (Germany) and Renault (France). He practiced mechanical engineering until his retirement.

Simonian was also one of the founding members of "Homenetmen Հ.Մ.Ը.Մ", an Armenian general athletic union, in Baghdad, Iraq, in 1961.

== Personal life and death ==
He held a dual Australian and American citizenship, as well as having a residence in Armenia. He was married to Zvart Vartanian, an educator and Armenian socialite, who was involved in many humanitarian, social and educational organizations such as the Armenian Relief Society. Together they had three children, (Dr. Margaret, Sarkis and Andy) Simonian, as well as two grandchildren (Leo and Henry) Simonian. He died on 17 April 2019, at the age of 86.

== Awards ==
Simonian was granted the International Federation of Bodybuilding and Fitness (I.F.B.B.) Gold Medal in 1992 for his outstanding support of bodybuilding and fitness in Iraq, and the International Weightlifting Federation (I.W.F.) Gold Medal in 1981 for 25 years of service. He was also awarded the I.W.F. Golden Plaque in 2007 for 50 Years of Outstanding and Meritorious Service as International Referee in Body Building & Weightlifting, as well as the I.F.B.B. Gold Medal for his contribution towards the development of bodybuilding in Armenia in 2000. That same year, he was granted the Key to the Historic City of Melaka, by the Chief Minister of Melaka, Malaysia. In 2011, Simonian was nominated for Australian Citizen of The Year by the City of Ryde.

He was one of five people in the world, and the only Armenian, who was awarded with a 50 Years Golden Plaque.
