= Garegin Poghosyan =

Armenian military officer

- Military career
- Allegiance: Armenia; Artsakh
- Rank: Colonel
- Conflicts: 2020 Nagorno-Karabakh war
- Awards: National Hero of Armenia (2020)

Garegin Poghosyan (Armenian: Գարեգին Սամվելի Պողոսյան) is an Armenian military officer, Colonel of the Armed Forces of Armenia, Commander of the N military unit of the Ministry of Defence of Armenia, National Hero of Armenia (2020).

== Awards and honours ==
On October 22, 2020, by the decree of the President of Armenia Armen Sarkissian, Colonel Poghosyan Garegin Samveli was awarded the highest title of the National Hero of Armenia.
