= Karekin I Khachadourian =

Armenian Patriarch of Constantinople from 1951 to 1961

Archbishop Karekin I Khachadourian (in Armenian Գարեգին Ա Խաչատուրյան) (6 November 1880, Trebizond – 22 July 1961, Istanbul) was the 81st Armenian Patriarch of Constantinople under the authority of the Catholicos of Armenia and of all Armenians.

He was born Khachik Khachadourian in Trabzon, taking the name Karekin on ordination.

He assumed his duties as Patriarch on 16 March 1951, after he returned from serving in Argentina. He established the Tbrevank school in 1953, a boarding school which also provided education for the future Armenian priests. He encouraged the Armenians to send their children to the Tbrevank school, the only school that was able to provide education in Armenian in Turkey at the time, as all Armenian schools in the Turkish countryside were closed and the law prohibited the establishment of new Armenian schools.

Religious titles
Preceded by Mesrob I Naroyan	Armenian Patriarch of Constantinople; 1951–1961	Succeeded by Shenork I Kaloustian
