= Kumkapı =

Coordinates: 41°00′N 28°58′E

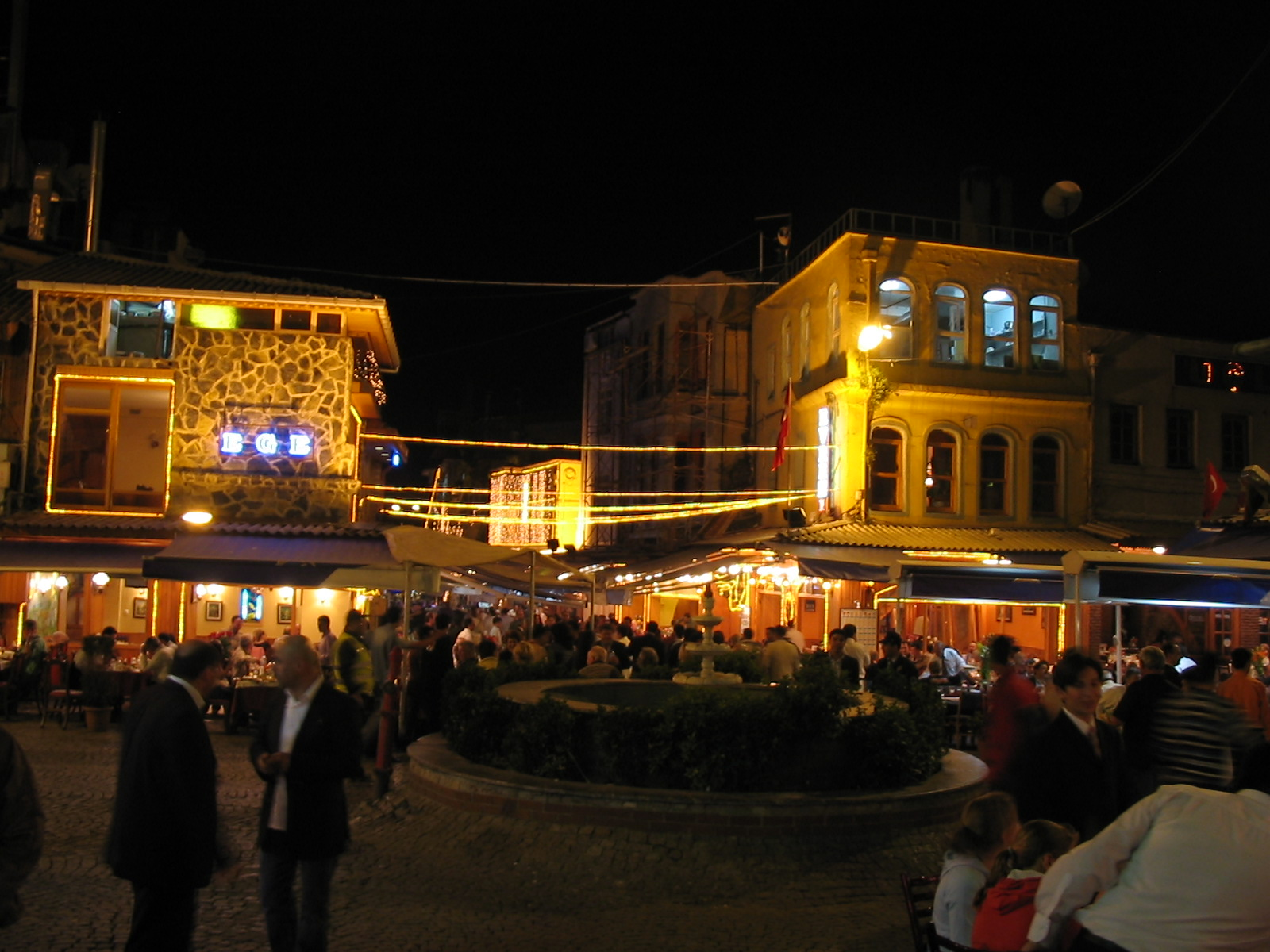
- Seafood restaurants in Kumkapı at night

- Location of Fatih in Istanbul
- Country: Turkey
- Province: Istanbul
- District: Fatih
- Time zone: GMT +2
- Area code: (+90) 212

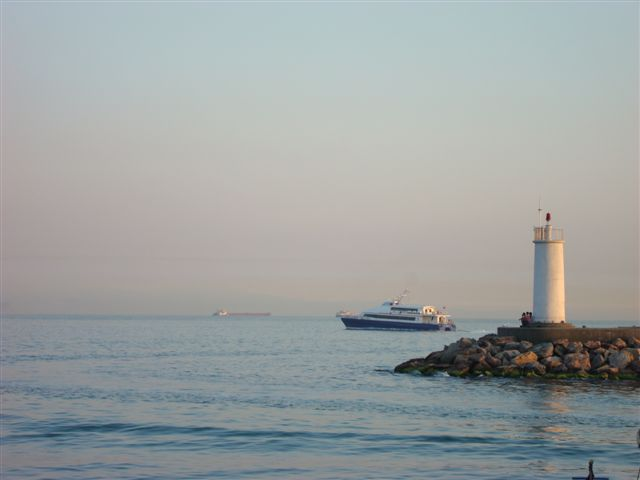
View of the Marmara Sea from Kumkapı.

Kumkapı (lit. 'Sand Gate') is a quarter in Fatih district of Istanbul. It is located along the northern shore of Marmara Sea. Up to recent times, Kumkapı is the center of the Armenian community of the city, boasting a school and several churches. It is also where the seat of the Armenian Patriarchate of Constantinople is located. The quarter is famous for its many fish restaurants; therefore attracting many local and foreign tourists round the year.

== History ==
In the Byzantine period, the area was known in Greek as Kontoskàlion.

During the British bombing of İstanbul, the area was damaged in 18 October 1918.

== Notable buildings in Kumkapı ==
- Surp Asdvadzadzin Patriarchal Church
- Surp Harutyun Church
- Church of St Kyriaki
- Panayia Elpida Greek Orthodox Church

== Transportation ==
Kumkapı used to be served by a station on the Sirkeci suburban until 2013, when the station was indefinitely closed as a part of the Marmaray project. The Kumkapı station is now served by the T6 line inaugurated in February 2024. Kumkapı is also easily accessible by sea.

== See also ==
- Kum Kapu demonstration
- List of restaurant districts and streets
- Armenians in Turkey
- List of Armenian ethnic enclaves
