= Surp Asdvadzadzin Patriarchal Church =

Church building in istanbul, Turkey

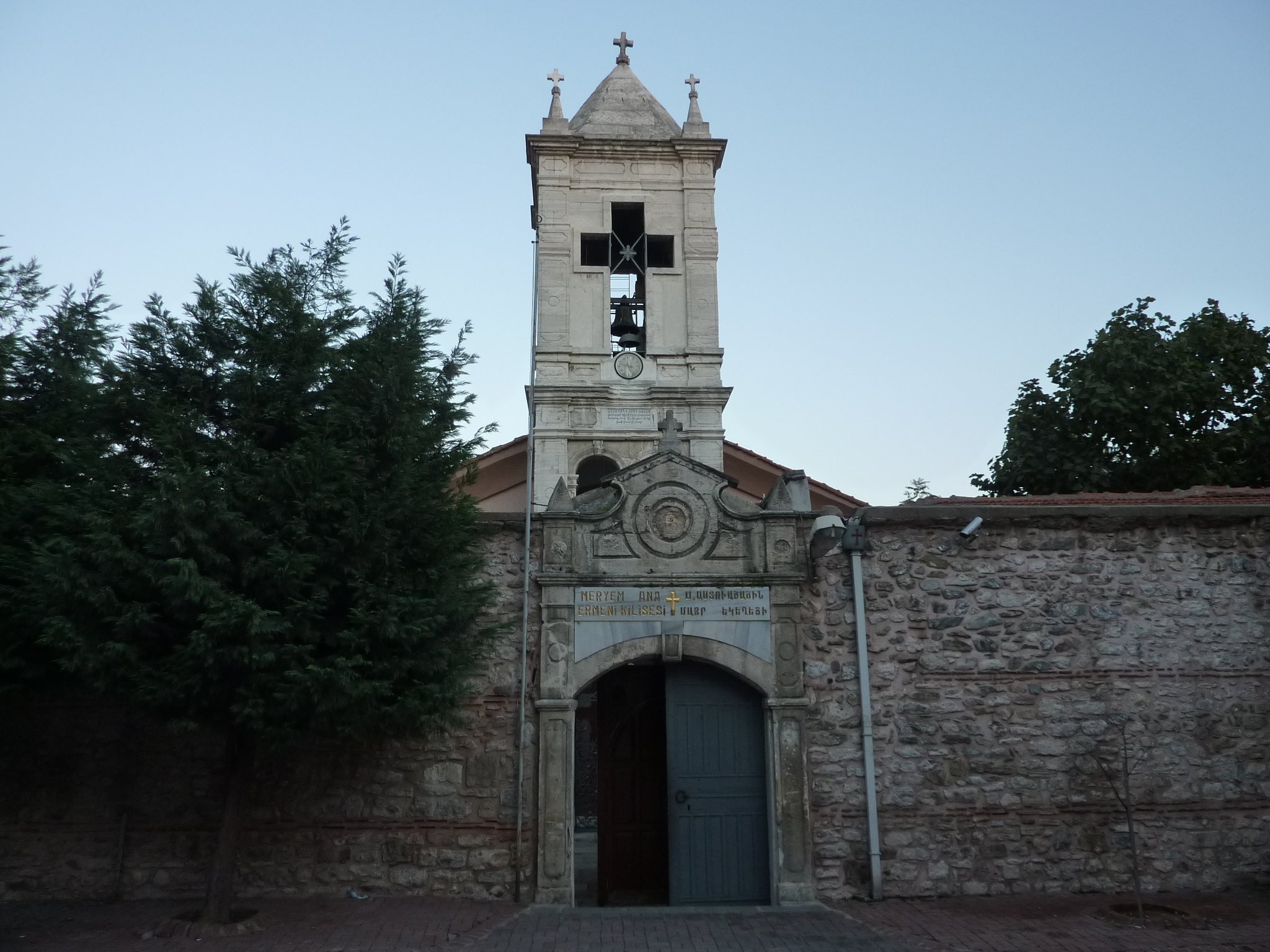
- Street view of the Surp Asdvadzadzin Patriarchal Church in Kumkapı, Istanbul, Turkey

- Shown within Fatih, Istanbul

Religion
- Affiliation: Armenian Apostolic Church
- District: Fatih
- Province: Istanbul
- Region: 1st (Old Istanbul)
- Rite: Armenian Rite
- Ownership: Armenian Patriarchate of Constantinople
- Status: active

Location
- Country: Turkey
- Interactive map of Surp Asdvadzadzin Patriarchal Church
- Coordinates: 41°00′17″N 28°57′39″E

Surp Asdvadzadzin Patriarchal Church, also known as the Holy Mother of God Patriarchal Church, (Armenian: Սուրբ Աստուածածին Աթոռանիստ Մայր Տաճար, Turkish: Aziz Meryem Ana Patriklik Kilisesi) is an Armenian Apostolic church located in Kumkapı quarter of Fatih district in old Istanbul, Turkey. It is the church of the Armenian Patriarchate of Constantinople, which has its offices directly across the church in the same street.

== See also ==
- Armenians in Turkey
