= Armenian Patriarchate of Constantinople =

Autonomous See

Coordinates: 41.0045°N 28.9612°E

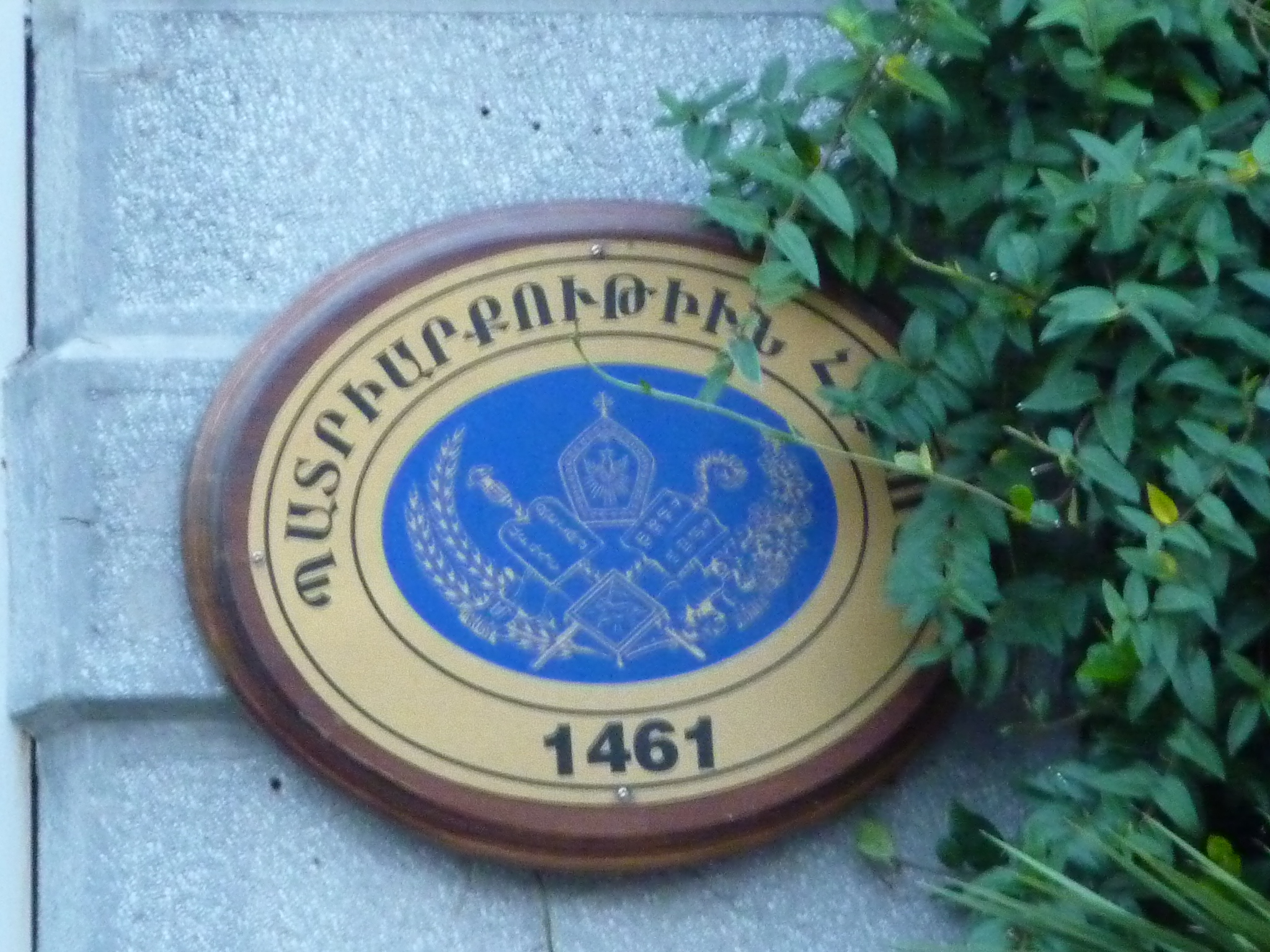
- Coat-of-arms of the Armenian Patriarchate of Constantinople
- Classification: Oriental Orthodox
- Primate: Sahak II Mashalian
- Language: Western Armenian
- Headquarters: Istanbul, Turkey
- Territory: Turkey
- Recognition: by Armenian Apostolic Church as their autonomous church
- Separations: Armenian Evangelical Church (1846)
- Members: 95,000

The Armenian Patriarchate of Constantinople (Turkish: İstanbul Ermeni Patrikhanesi; Western Armenian: Պատրիարքութիւն Հայոց Կոստանդնուպոլսոյ, Badriark'ut'iun Hayots' Gosdantnubolsoy) is an autonomous see of the Armenian Apostolic Church. The seat of the Armenian Patriarch of Constantinople (French: Patriarche de Constantinople, Turkish: Konstantinopolis Ermeni Patriği (Note: In languages of other ethnic minorities of the Ottoman Empire: Bulgarian: патриарх Patriark; Greek: πατριάρχης patriarkis; Ladino: patriarkas)), also known as Armenian Patriarch of Istanbul, is the Surp Asdvadzadzin Patriarchal Church (Holy Mother of God Patriarchal Church) in the Kumkapı neighborhood of Istanbul.

The patriarchate is one of the smallest of the Oriental Orthodox Churches but one that has exerted a very significant political role and today still exercises a spiritual authority. The Armenian Patriarchate of Constantinople recognizes the primacy of the Catholicos of All Armenians, in the spiritual and administrative headquarters of the Armenian Church, the Etchmiadzin, Armenia, in matters that pertain to the worldwide Armenian Apostolic Church. In local matters, the patriarchal see is autonomous.

== History ==
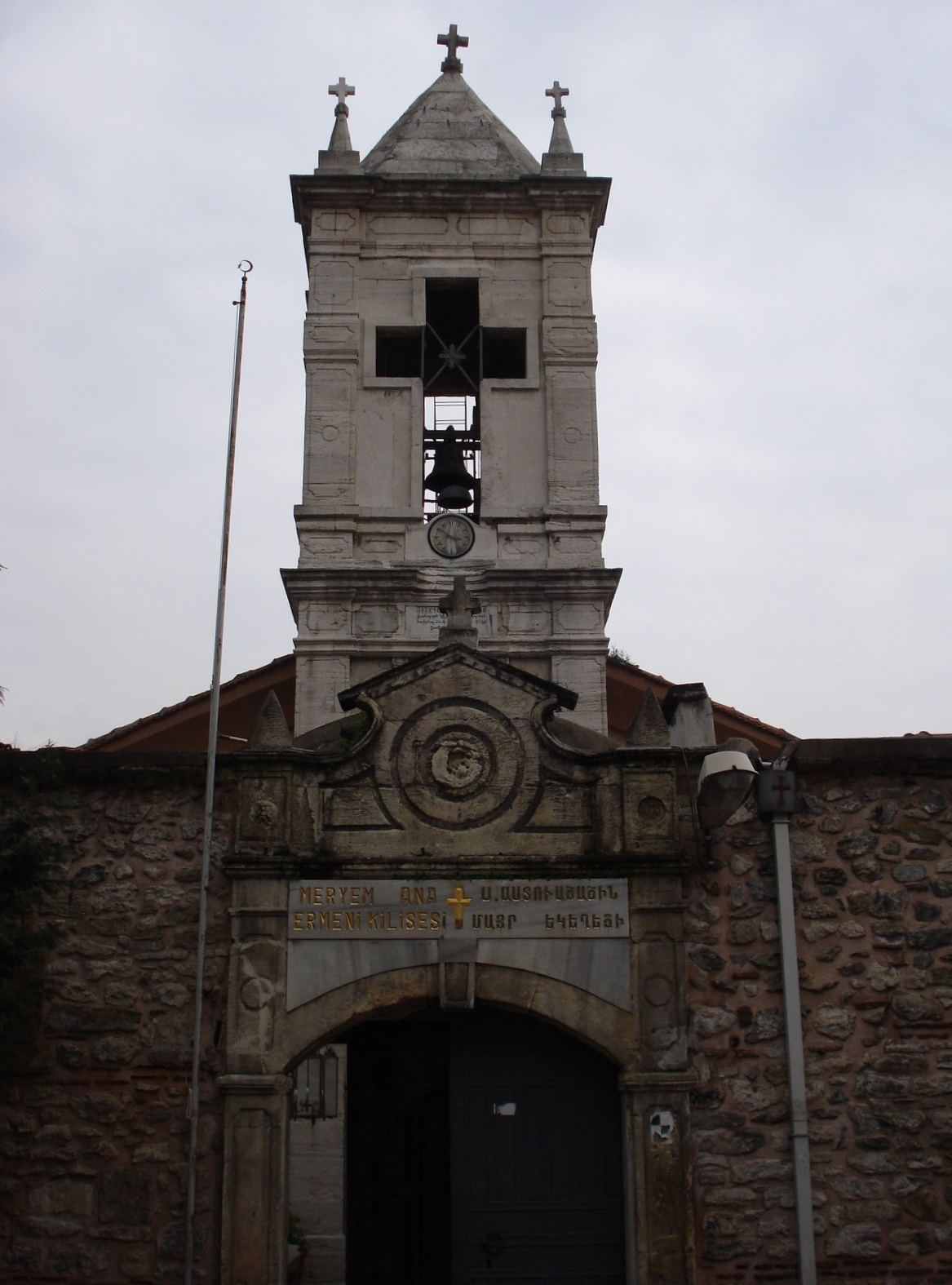
Armenian Church adjacent to the patriarchal residence in Istanbul

=== Establishment in 1461 ===
During the Byzantine period, the Armenian Apostolic Church had not been allowed to operate in Constantinople because the two churches (Armenian Church and Orthodox Church) mutually regarded each other as heretical. The schism was rooted in the rejection of the Council of Chalcedon by the Oriental Orthodox Churches, of which the Armenian Church is a part, while the Byzantine Church and the rest of Eastern Orthodoxy had accepted it.

After conquering Constantinople, the Ottoman Empire allowed the Greek Orthodox Patriarchate of Constantinople to stay in the city. But Sultan Mehmed II asked the Armenians to establish their own church in the new Ottoman capital, as part of the Millet system. From then on the Armenian Patriarchate of Constantinople acted as a superior administrative institution in the Ottoman Empire, even standing over the Armenian Catholicos. The Syriac Orthodox community in the Ottoman Empire was also under the Armenian Millet until 1882.

The first Armenian patriarch of Constantinople was Hovakim I, who was at the time the metropolitan of Bursa. In 1461, he was brought to Constantinople by Sultan Mehmed II and established as the Armenian patriarch of Constantinople. Hovakim I was recognized as the religious and secular leader of all Armenians in the Ottoman Empire, and carried the title of milletbaşı or ethnarch as well as patriarch.

=== Ottoman period, 1461–1908 ===
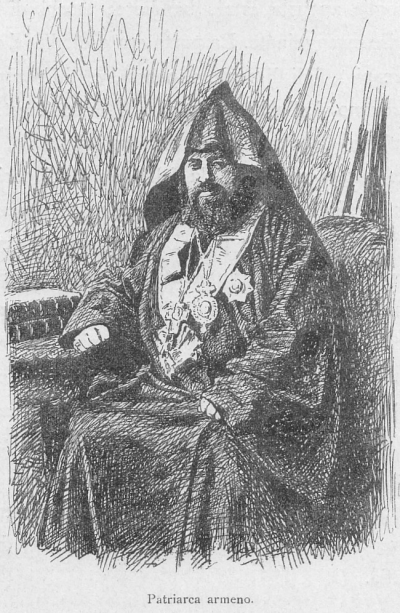
Patriarch Nerses II Varjabedyan in 1878.

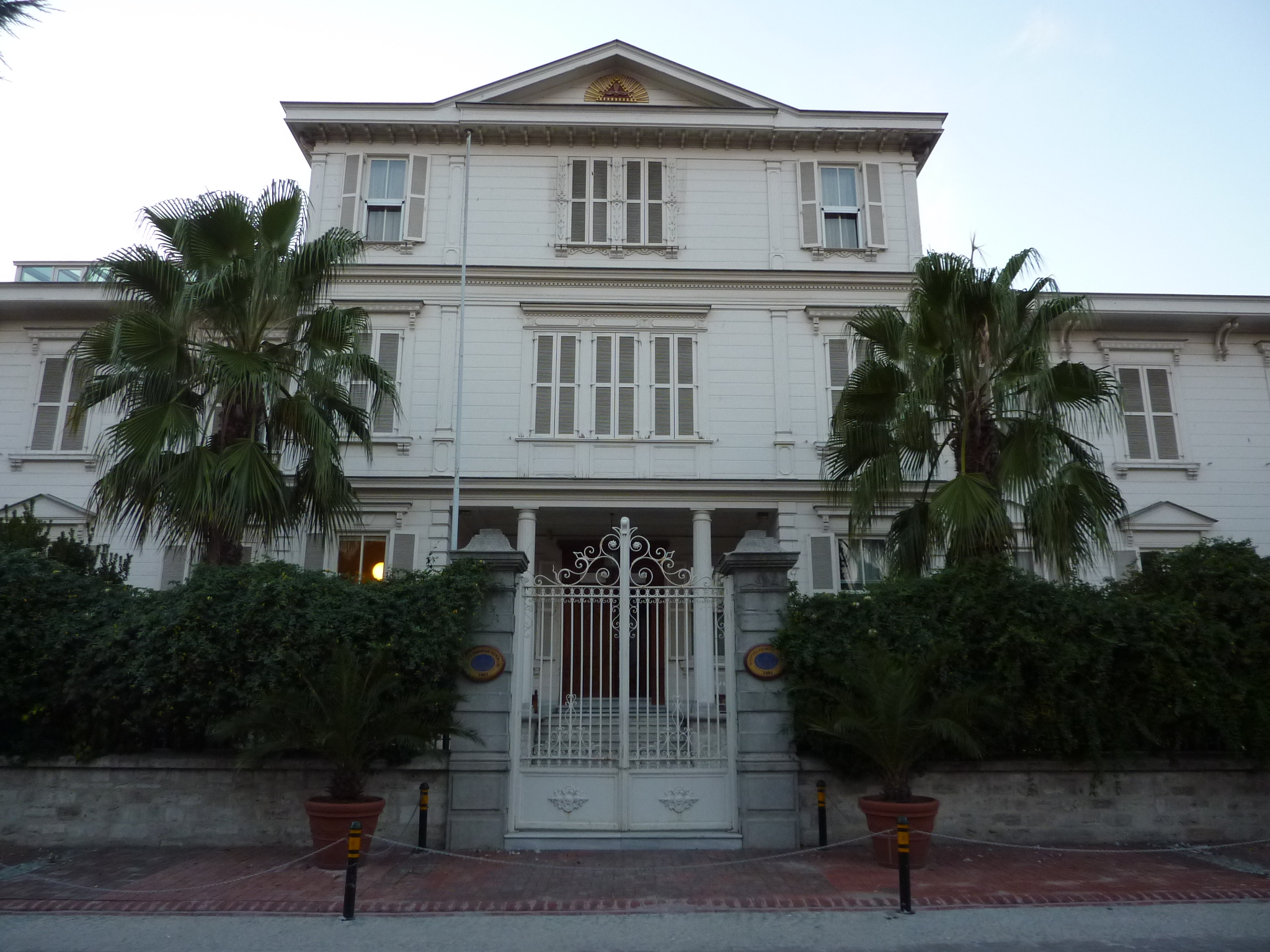
The building of the patriarchate in Istanbul

The Armenian Patriarchate served the Armenians in the Ottoman Empire with a line of patriarchs in Constantinople. However, like the Greek Patriarchate, the Armenians suffered severely from intervention by the state in their internal affairs. Although there have been 115 pontificates since 1461, there have only been 84 individual patriarchs. In 1861, a national constitution (Sahmanadrootiun in Armenian) was granted to Armenians living in the Ottoman Empire by Sultan Abdülaziz. In 1896 Patriarch Madteos III (Izmirlian) was deposed and exiled to Jerusalem by Sultan Abdülhamid II for boldly denouncing the 1896 massacre. The constitution governing the Armenians was suspended by the Sultan.

=== Young Turks period, 1908–1922 ===
The Armenian patriarch of Constantinople Madteos III (Izmirlian) was permitted to return to Istanbul in 1908 when Sultan Abdulhamid II was deposed by the Young Turks.

The new Turkish administration also restored the constitution. In the initial period of the reign of the Young Turks, the Armenians enjoyed a brief period of restoration of civil liberties between 1908 and 1915.

However, in 1915 the Armenians suffered great hardship under the Young Turk administration owing to the desire of the Turkish government for its peoples to be religiously homogeneous (i.e., Muslim), motivated perhaps by an imagined threat of Armenians from Russian influences with whom Turkey was at war. The Armenian community of Turkey in 1915 was accordingly decimated by mass deportations and killings. The events surrounding this ethnic cleansing of Armenians from Turkey have become known as the Armenian genocide. The inability of Turkey to acknowledge these events has been a source of significant angst among Armenians worldwide for the past hundred years. Prior to 1915, almost two million Armenians lived in Turkey; today (2015) less than 100,000 reside there.

With this backdrop of turmoil for Armenians, the post of the patriarch remained vacant from 1915 to 1919. The office was abolished by the Council of Ministers on July 28, 1916. It was restored for a brief period from 1919 to 1922 with Patriarch Zaven I Der Yeghiayan residing. To alleviate the fate of the survivors of the Armenian genocide the patriarchate founded a Committee for Orphan Relief, a Central Committee for Deportees and was also involved in the establishment of the National Relief Mission.

=== Republic of Turkey, 1923–present ===
Despite a huge diminution in the number of its faithful during the Armenian genocide, the patriarchate remains the spiritual head of the largest Christian community presently living in Turkey.

Today, the Armenian patriarchs are recognized as the head of the Armenian Apostolic Church in Turkey and he is invited to state ceremonies.

Five Armenian patriarchs have served after the establishment of the Republic of Turkey. The synod of the Patriarchate has designated, with the votes of 25 of its 26 members, Aram Ateşyan as Patrik Genel Vekili (Turkish for acting patriarch) in 2010 because of the illness of the Patriarch Mesrob II Mutafyan. Some members of the Armenian community of Turkey criticised this move and asked for the election of a new patriarch by universal suffrage instead. (It is estimated that some 20 thousand members of the community are eligible to vote in such an election.) At last, the synod decided to retire the Patriarch Mesrob II Mutafyan on October 26, 2016, and to organize an election for a new patriarch. Following the death of Patriarch Mesrob II, Abp. Sahak II Mashalian was elected Patriarch of İstanbul in 2019.

== See also ==
- List of Armenian Patriarchs of Constantinople
- Armenians in the Ottoman Empire
- Armenians in Turkey
- Armenian Apostolic Church
