= Selman Nacar =

Turkish film director (born 1990)

- Pronunciation: He/him
- Born: October 10, 1990 (age 36); Uşak, Turkey
- Citizenship: Turkey
- Education: Istanbul Bilgi University; Columbia University (MFA)
- Occupations: Film director, film producer

Selman Nacar (born October 10, 1990) is a Turkish filmmaker and film producer.

== Early life and education ==
Nacar was raised in Uşak. He graduated from the Istanbul Bilgi University Faculty of Law in 2015 and earned a degree from the Faculty of Film in 2016. He later received a Master of Fine Arts degree in film directing from Columbia University.

== Career ==
In 2018, Nacar founded the production company Kuyu Film, which produced the Burak Çevik films The Pillar of Salt (2018) and Belonging (2019).

Nacar's directorial debut, Between Two Dawns, premiered at the 2021 San Sebastián International Film Festival. The drama thriller went on to win the top prize at that year's Torino Film Festival.

Hesitation Wound, Nacar's 2023 courtroom drama film starring Tülin Özen, premiered in the Orizzonti section of the 80th Venice International Film Festival. Presenting a critique of the Turkish judicial system, the film was recognized as the Best International Feature at the Zurich Film Festival and garnered Nacar the Best Director award at the Arras Film Festival.

== Filmography ==
| Year | English title | Original title | Director | Producer | Ref. |
|---|---|---|---|---|---|
| 2018 | The Pillar of Salt | Tuzdan Kaide | No | Yes | |
| 2019 | Belonging | Aidiyet | No | Yes | |
| 2021 | Between Two Dawns | İki Şafak Arasında | Yes | Yes | |
| 2023 | Hesitation Wound | Tereddüt Çizgisi | Yes | Yes | |

== Awards and nominations ==
| Year | Award | Category | Nominated work | Result | Ref. |
|---|---|---|---|---|---|
| 2021 | San Sebastián International Film Festival | New Directors Award | Between Two Dawns | Nominated | |
| 2021 | Torino Film Festival | Best Feature Film | Between Two Dawns | Won | |
| 2023 | Venice Film Festival | Orizzonti | Hesitation Wound | Nominated | |
| 2023 | Zurich Film Festival | Best International Feature | Hesitation Wound | Won | |
| 2023 | Arras Film Festival | Best Director | Hesitation Wound | Won | |
