= Etyen Mahçupyan =

Turkish author and journalist

Etyen Mahcupyan
- Etyen Mahçupyan in 2014 at a panel for Insight Turkey

Personal details
- Born: 9 March 1950 Istanbul, Turkey
- Education: Robert College
- Alma mater: Boğaziçi University (BS, MS); Ankara University (MS)
- Occupation: Author; Columnist

Etyen Mahçupyan (born 9 March 1950) is a Turkish journalist, writer, columnist and politician of Armenian descent who served as the senior adviser to Prime Minister of Turkey Ahmet Davutoğlu from 2014 to 2015. He is one of the executive members of the founders' committee of the Future Party.

== Early life and education ==
Mahçupyan was born in 1950 in Istanbul as a son of a Catholic Armenian family. His surname derives from his great-grandfather's nickname, "Mahcup", meaning shy, embarrassed, or reticent. He learned the Armenian language in elementary school; however Turkish was the main language spoken at his household.

He graduated from Robert College in 1968. In 1972, he received his bachelor of science degree in chemical engineering from the Boğaziçi University in Istanbul. Realizing that earning a living would entail working under a manager, he studied business management, and finance. He completed his Master of Science degree at Business management in 1974 at Boğaziçi University. He received his second Master of Science degree in the area of international economics from the Faculty of Political Sciences at Ankara University in 1977.

He received his MS degree from Prof. Yahya Sezel in the Department of Economics at Ankara university during 1977–1980. Simultaneously, he also worked as a writer and an editor at the journal of Toplumcu Düşün (English: "Societist Idea", which published sixteen issues between June 1978 and May 1980) with Tezel.

Following the coup of 1980, Mahçupyan left graduate school moving into business. To support himself, he worked as a manager at several companies including Eczacıbaşı Group as well as his own bakery business. After 1989, he started working for a consultancy firm, learning to work on “productivity-enhancing cultural and psychological change in companies.” As a result of the kind of consultancy work he was doing, he studied social psychology.

== Journalism ==
In mid 90s, he transferred his own businesses to his partner and moved into journalism. During 1995–1996, he was briefly involved in New Democracy Movement that was established under the leadership of Cem Boyner. Between 1997 and 2000 he wrote as a columnist at Radikal newspaper and in 2000 at Yeni Binyıl newspaper. On 17 May 2001 he started writing at Zaman and stayed there until 2014. Upon the assassination of his close friend Hrant Dink in 2007, he became the editor-in-chief of Agos, the Armenian community's weekly newspaper and stayed at that position until his leave in 2010. Between 2014 and 2018, he kept writing his columns in Akşam. and Daily Sabah and Karar newspaper that is known to share political views in line with Ahmet Davutoğlu.

== Political career ==
In October 2014, Mahçupyan was appointed as the senior advisor to prime minister of Turkey Ahmet Davutoğlu. It was the first time in modern Turkish history that an Armenian descent was appointed to such a critical position and his appointment drew praise as a sign of Turkey's commitment to minority rights. He technically retired from this position on 9 March 2015. The announcement came a day after he openly acknowledged the Armenian genocide. However he stated that his departure had nothing to do with the row. He said he retired in March due to the mandatory retirement age for civil servants, and has kept advising Davutoğlu afterwards informally.

As a part of his senior advisory duty to former prime minister Ahmet Davutoğlu, he traveled and met with journalists, politicians and bureaucrats for better communication purposes that would lead to solutions to regional problems in which Turkey clearly plays a crucial role. Some of his past appearances include the Hrant Dink Memorial Peace and Justice Lecture: Minorities and Human Rights in Turkey , the Centre for Turkey Studies (CEFTUS) roundtable entitled Understanding the Transformation; AK Party Era in Turkey, and The New Turkey conference at the Italian Parliament.

He was a member of TESEV advisory board and also the director at TESEV until late 2014. Afterwards, he and his colleagues at TESEV resigned from their positions and all together established a new NGO named PODEM. PODEM is a Public Policy and Democracy Studies foundation which describes itself as:

"The Center for Public Policy and Democracy Studies (PODEM) is an Istanbul-based independent think tank founded in February 2015. PODEM seeks to contribute to the efforts towards the creation of a Turkey where democracy is fully institutionalized, and where a democratic mindset, social peace and justice prevail. It further envisions a Turkey that is increasingly influential in the establishment of peace and justice on regional and global levels."

As of 2019, Mahçupyan has been working with Davutoğlu as one of the founders of the Future Party.

== Movies and television ==
Mahçupyan was the screenplay writer of the movies Pains of Autumn and Mrs. Salkım's Diamonds. and he also hosted several TV programs.

== Publications ==
=== Books ===
- Tımarhane Günlerim (2016)
- İçimizdeki Öteki (2015)
- 1915-2015 Yüzyıllık Sorun (2014)
- Bir Zamanlar Ermeniler Vardı (2008)
- Batı'yı Anlamak (2008)
- Türkiye'yi Anlamak (2008)
- Liberallik Demokratlık Tartışması (2008)
- Bir Demokratın Gündemi (2007)
- Bir Zümre, Bir Parti: Türkiye'de Ordu (2004)
- İkinci Tanzimat (2003)
- Batı'dan Doğu'ya, Dünden Bugüne Zihniyet Yapıları ve Değişim (2000)
- Radikal Yazılar 4 : Büyük Travmanın Eşiğinde (2000)
- Radikal Yazılar 3 : Yönetemeyen Cumhuriyet (2000)
- Radikal Yazılar 2 (2000)
- Radikal Yazılar 1 (1998)
- Türkiye'de Merkeziyetçilik: Devlet ve Din (1998)
- İdeolojiler ve Modernite (1997)
- Beyin Fırtınası : Demokrasi, Batılılaşma, Laiklik, Devlet, Yeni Dünya Düzeni (1997)
- Osmanlı'dan Postmoderniteye (1996)

== Movies ==
- Pains of Autumn (2009)
- Mrs. Salkım's Diamonds (1999)
