= Hesitation Wound =

2023 drama film

- Directed by: Selman Nacar
- Written by: Selman Nacar
- Starring: Tülin Özen
- Cinematography: Tudor Vladimir Panduru
- Edited by: Melik Kuru; Selman Nacar
- Release date: September 5, 2023 (Venice)
- Language: Turkish

Hesitation Wound (Turkish: Tereddüt Çizgisi) is a 2023 legal drama film written and directed by Selman Nacar. A co-production between Turkey, Spain, Romania and France, it premiered in the Orizzonti section at the 80th Venice International Film Festival.

== Cast ==
- Tülin Özen as Canan
- Ogulcan Arman Uslu as Musa
- Gulcin Kultur Sahin as Belgin
- Vedat Erincin as Hakim
- Okan Avcı as Osman

== Reception ==
=== Critical response ===
On the review aggregator website Rotten Tomatoes, 83% of 12 critics' reviews are positive, with an average rating of 8.0/10.

=== Awards and nominations ===
Awards and nominations for Holly
Award	Date of ceremony	Category	Recipient(s)	Result	Ref.
Arras Film Festival	12 November 2023	Silver Atlas	Hesitation Wound	Won	
Brussels Mediterranean Film Festival	8 December 2023	Grand Prix	Hesitation Wound	Won	
