= Hrant Dink =

Turkish-Armenian journalist (1954–2007)

- Born: 15 September 1954; Malatya, Turkey
- Died: 19 January 2007 (aged 52); Istanbul, Turkey
- Cause of death: Assassination by a Hitman
- Education: Istanbul University
- Occupation: journalist
- Notable credit(s): Founder and editor-in-chief of Agos
- Spouse: Rakel Yağbasan (m. 1976)
- Children: 3, including Arat

Hrant Dink (Armenian: Հրանդ Տինք; Western Armenian pronunciation: [ˈhɾantʰ ˈdiŋkʰ]; 15 September 1954 – 19 January 2007) was a Turkish-Armenian journalist, human rights activist, founder and editor-in-chief of Agos. As editor-in-chief of the bilingual Turkish-Armenian newspaper Agos, Dink was a prominent member of the Armenian minority in Turkey best known for advocating Turkish–Armenian reconciliation and human and minority rights in Turkey. He was often critical of both Turkey's denial of the Armenian genocide and of the Armenian diaspora's campaign for its international recognition. Dink was prosecuted three times for "insulting Turkishness", while receiving numerous death threats from Turkish nationalists.

Dink was assassinated in Istanbul on 19 January 2007 by Ogün Samast, a 17-year-old Turkish nationalist. Dink was shot three times in the head dying instantly. Photographs of the assassin flanked by smiling Turkish police and gendarmerie, posing with the killer side by side in front of the Turkish flag, surfaced. The photos sparked a scandal in Turkey, prompting a spate of investigations and the removal from office of those involved. Samast was later sentenced to 22 years in prison by a Turkish court. He was released on parole for "good behaviour" on 15 November 2023, after spending 16 years and 10 months in prison. At Dink's funeral, over one hundred thousand mourners marched in protest of the assassination, chanting, "We are all Armenians" and "We are all Hrant Dink". Criticism of Article 301 of the Turkish Penal Code became increasingly vocal after his death, leading to parliamentary proposals for repeal. The 2007–2008 academic year at the College of Europe was named in his honour.

== Early life ==
Hrant Dink was born in Malatya on 15 September 1954, the eldest of three sons to Sarkis Dink (known as Haşim Kalfa), a tailor from Gürün, Sivas, and Gülvart Dink, from Kangal, Sivas. His father's gambling debts led to the family's move to Istanbul in 1960, where they sought a new beginning. Sarkis Dink's gambling continued in İstanbul, however, and one year after their move, Dink's parents separated, leaving the seven-year-old Dink and his brothers without a place to live. Dink's grandmother enrolled the boys at the Gedikpaşa Armenian Orphanage; Dink often noted his grandfather, who spoke seven languages and read constantly, as the role model and father figure who inspired his love of letters.

The Gedikpaşa Armenian Orphanage, an institution run by the Armenian Evangelical Community, was to be home to Hrant Dink for the next ten years. The orphanage children spent their summers at the Tuzla Armenian Children's Camp, on the Marmara beachfront in a suburb of İstanbul, building and improving the summer camp during their stay. The Tuzla Armenian Children's Camp played a significant role in Hrant Dink's life, both personally, as he met his future wife as a child and later married her at the camp, and professionally, as the government-led closing of the Camp in 1984 was one of the factors that raised Dink's awareness of the issues of the Armenian community and eventually led to his becoming an activist.

Dink received his primary education at the Hay Avedaranagan İncirdibi Protestant Armenian Primary School and Bezciyan School and his secondary education at the Üsküdar Surp Haç Armenian High School, working as a tutor at the same time.

During his senior year, he was expelled from the Üsküdar Surp Haç, and completed his high school degree at the Şişli Public High School. Hrant Dink continued his education at Istanbul University, where he studied zoology and became a sympathizer of TİKKO, the armed faction of the Maoist TKP-ML. Around this time, in 1972, he legally changed his name (to Fırat Dink), along with two Armenian friends, Armanek and İstepan, to disassociate their factional activities from the Armenian community. His friend Armanek Bakırcıyan, who changed his name to Orhan Bakır, later rose in TİKKO to membership of the central committee, took part in armed struggle in Eastern Turkey and was killed during fighting in 1978. Having fallen in love, Hrant Dink parted ways with his friends and remained at the sympathizer level, completing his bachelor's degree in zoology and enrolling in the Philosophy Department for a second bachelor's degree, which he did not complete.

=== Rakel Yağbasan, childhood friend, future wife ===
Dink met his future wife, Rakel Yağbasan, when she came to the Tuzla Armenian Children's Camp at age nine in 1968. Born in 1959 in Silopi, Cizre, Rakel was one of 13 children of Siyament Yağbasan, head of the Varto clan and Delal Yağbasan who died when Rakel was a child.

In 1915, the Varto clan had received orders to relocate along with the rest of the Armenian population in the region, but they were attacked during the journey. Five families from the clan escaped to nearby Mount Cudi and settled there, remaining without any contact to the outside world for 25 years. Eventually they re-established contact and largely assimilated into the nearby Kurdish population, speaking Kurdish exclusively, although they retained knowledge of their Armenian origin and Christian beliefs. Armenian Protestant lay preacher Hrant Güzelyan (also known as Küçükgüzelyan), who was running a program for relocating Anatolian Armenians to İstanbul, visited the clan and brought back around 20 children to the Tuzla Camp, including Rakel and two of her brothers.

Staying at the Tuzla Camp during summers and at the Gedikpaşa Orphanage during winters, Rakel learned Turkish and Armenian, and finished primary school. Because Rakel was registered as a Turk, not as an Armenian, she was not allowed to enroll at Armenian community schools and her father did not give permission for her to attend a Turkish school past then-compulsory 5th grade. Not able to obtain further formal schooling, Rakel was privately tutored by instructors at the Gedikpaşa Orphanage.

Rakel's father, Siyament Yağbasan, at first opposed Hrant Dink's marriage proposal since the Varto clan traditionally practiced endogamy, but eventually relented when elders of the Armenian community, including Patriarch Kalustyan, applied pressure and Rakel declared that she would marry no one else. Hrant Dink and Rakel Yağbasan got married in a civil ceremony at the Tuzla Camp on 19 April 1976 when they were 22 and 17, respectively. One year later, at Rakel Dink's insistence, the couple conducted a church wedding ceremony on 23 April 1977. Hrant and Rakel Dink had three children: Delal, Arat, and Sera.

=== Religious beliefs ===
Dink was baptized and married within the Armenian Apostolic Church, but was educated and sheltered at Armenian Protestant institutions and received his introduction to religion within the Protestant sphere. Dink was a member of the Armenian Evangelical Church of Gedikpaşa, Istanbul, as well as a member by birth in the Armenian Apostolic Church. He regarded both churches as part of his culture and said that he was not someone who dealt heavily with religious rituals. Keeping the duality to the end, his funeral service was held in the Apostolic Church, by Patriarch Mutafyan, with Protestant ministers delivering eulogies at the burial.

=== After university ===
Having graduated from the university, Hrant Dink completed his military service in Denizli; not being promoted to sergeant despite his full marks on the examination caused him to weep. Whether his not being promoted was due to his association with TİKKO or his Armenian heritage, the discrimination he felt was one of the turning points on his way to activism. Returning to İstanbul, Dink established "Beyaz Adam" (literally "White Man"), a bookstore in the Bakırköy district with his brothers Hosrop and Yervant in 1979. Encouraging students to browse and borrow needed books, the store gained recognition by word of mouth and gradually expanded into a multi-location bookstore and publishing house that specialized in textbooks, children's books, atlases and dictionaries.

After the 1980 coup d'état, when it became difficult for Turkish citizens to obtain passports for travel abroad, Dink's brother Hosrop started traveling to Beirut and then to Europe by using falsified identification papers, and when he was caught in the act, Hrant Dink was also taken into custody as an associate. Soon afterwards, Dink was questioned twice again by the police, once when a former resident of the Tuzla Camp was investigated for possible connections to ASALA, an Armenian terrorist organization, and again when Hrant Güzelyan, who ran the Tuzla Camp, was arrested and charged with anti-Turkish propaganda, and had ASALA demand his release when they occupied the Turkish Consulate General in Paris and took hostages.

Dink played professional football with Taksim SK, the principal team for the Armenian community of Istanbul, in the 1982–83 season.

Alongside Mıgırdiç Margosyan and Yetvart Tomasyan, Dink founded Aras Publishing in 1993, which remains the only publishing house in Turkey publishing books in Western Armenian. Dink left Aras Publishing three years later to pursue his dream of founding Agos.

=== Tuzla Armenian Children's Camp ===
Dink, together with his wife Rakel, took over the management of the Tuzla Armenian Children's Camp at the time of Güzelyan's arrest, while continuing in the bookstore business with his brothers. In 1979, the General Directorate of Foundations started a court action to annul Gedikpaşa Armenian Protestant Church's ownership of the camp, based on a 1974 ruling by the Court of Appeals that made it impossible for minority foundations to own real estate beyond what they possessed in 1936. After a five-year legal battle, the court ruled that the land should be returned to its previous owner and in 1984 the camp was closed down. The closure of the camp, where over 22 years around 1,500 children stayed affected Dink deeply and over the years he wrote about the camp often:

"I went to Tuzla when I was 8. I poured my labour in there for 20 years. I met my wife Rakel there. We grew up together. We were married in the camp. Our children were born there... After the September 12 coup, our camp manager was arrested on the claim that he was raising Armenian militants. A wrongful claim. None of us was brought up to be a militant. My friends and I, each of us old charges of the camp, rushed to fill the job to save the camp and the orphanage from shutting down. But then, one day they handed us a paper from a court... 'We just found out that your minority institutions don't have a right to buy real estate. We never should have given you that permission way back then. This place will now revert to its old owner.' We fought for five years and we lost... Little chance we had with the state as the contester. Hear my plea, brothers, sisters!.."

The Tuzla Armenian Children's Camp was the subject of an exhibit by the Turkish Human Rights Organization in 1996, the materials from which was published in book form in 2000, with a foreword by Orhan Pamuk and an afterword by Hrant Dink. In 2001 the camp grounds were sold to a local businessman who intended to build a house on the site until Dink contacted him and let him know that the land had belonged to an orphanage. The businessman offered to donate the land back, but the law at the time did not permit it. At the time of Dink's death in 2007, the camp grounds continued to stand empty, awaiting the new Foundation law that was passed at the end of 2006 but was vetoed and returned to parliament by President Sezer.

== Editor of Agos ==
Dink was one of the founders of Agos weekly, the only newspaper in Turkey published in Armenian and Turkish, serving as its editor-in-chief from its founding in 1996 until his death in 2007. The first issue appeared on 5 April 1996 and was hailed by Patriarch Karekin II as a զատիկ (Easter) gift.

Agos was born out of a meeting called by Patriarch Karekin II when mainstream media started linking Armenians of Turkey with the illegal Kurdistan Workers' Party (PKK). A picture of PKK's leader Abdullah Öcalan and an Assyrian priest appeared in a Turkish daily, with the caption "Here's proof of the Armenian-PKK cooperation". Patriarch Karekin II asked the attendees at the meeting what needed to be done and the opinion that emerged from the meeting was that the Armenians in Turkey needed to communicate with the society at large. The group held a widely covered press conference, followed by monthly press events and eventually formed Agos.

Dink had not been a professional journalist until founding Agos. Up to that point, he had contributed occasional articles and book reviews to local Armenian language newspapers and corrections and letters to the editor to the national dailies. He soon became well known for his editorials in Agos and also wrote columns in the national dailies Zaman and BirGün.

Up to the founding of Agos, the Armenian community had two main newspapers, Marmara and Jamanak, both published only in Armenian. By publishing in Turkish as well as Armenian, Hrant Dink opened up the channels of communication to the society at large for the Armenian community. After Agos started its publication, the participation of Armenians in the political-cultural life in Turkey increased greatly, and public awareness in Turkey of the issues of the Armenians started to increase. Always willing to speak on the issues faced by Armenians, Hrant Dink emerged as a leader in his community and became a well-known public figure in Turkey.

At its inception, Agos started with a circulation of 2,000, and at the time of Hrant Dink's death had reached a circulation of around 6,000. Influential beyond its circulation, often applauded greatly by some and criticized heavily by others, Agos became a paper whose editorial viewpoint was sought after.

=== Editorial policy ===
Dink's unique perspective has been described as a "four way mirror", simultaneously empathetic to people of the Armenian diaspora, citizens of Armenia, Turkish Armenians, and citizens of Turkey. Under Dink's editorship, Agos concentrated on five major topics: Speaking against any unfair treatment of the Armenian community in Turkey, covering human rights violations and problems of democratization in Turkey, carrying news of developments in Armenia, with special emphasis on the Turkey-Armenia relations, publishing articles and serials on the Armenian cultural heritage and its contributions to the Ottoman Empire and Turkey, criticizing malfunctions and non-transparency in the Armenian community institutions.

As a leftist activist, Dink often spoke and wrote about the problems of democratization in Turkey, defending other authors such as Nobel laureate Orhan Pamuk and novelist Perihan Mağden who came under criticism and prosecution for their opinions. In a speech Hrant Dink delivered on 19 May 2006, at a seminar jointly organized in Antalya by the Turkish Journalists' Association and the Konrad Adenauer Foundation, he said:

"I think the fundamental problems in Turkey exist for the majority as well . Therefore, ..., I will speak for the majority, including myself in it and dwell on where, we, as Turkey, are headed."

Acting as a voluntary spokesperson for the Armenian community in Turkey, Dink, through Agos, addressed the particular prejudices, injustices and problems the community faced in its interaction with the Turkish society and state. Agos, through Dink's pen, criticized discrimination against Armenians found in Turkish mainstream media, publicized the problems faced by Armenian foundations, and spoke against cases of destruction of the Armenian cultural heritage.

Dink, however, has been criticized for promoting antisemitic themes of blaming Dönme converts for the genocide.

=== Armenian issues ===
Dink hoped his questioning would pave the way for peace between the two peoples:

"If I write about the [Armenian] genocide it angers the Turkish generals. I want to write and ask how we can change this historical conflict into peace. They don't know how to solve the Armenian problem."

He defended his constant challenge of established notions:

"I challenge the accepted version of history because I do not write about things in black and white. People here are used to black and white; that's why they are astonished that there are other shades, too."

Dink was one of Turkey's most prominent Armenian voices and, despite threats on his life, he refused to remain silent. He always said his aim was to improve the difficult relationship between Turks and Armenians. Active in various democratic platforms and civil society organizations, Hrant Dink emphasized the need for democratization in Turkey and focused on the issues of free speech, minority rights, civic rights and issues pertaining to the Armenian community in Turkey. He was a very important peace activist. In his public speeches, which were often intensely emotional, he never refrained from using the word genocide when talking about the Armenian genocide, a term fiercely rejected by Turkey.

At the same time, he felt the term genocide had a political meaning, rather than a historical one, and he was critical of Armenian diaspora campaigning governments for official recognition of the genocide. In 2005, he accused Germany of using the genocide to block Turkey's entry to the European Union, stating that he was ashamed, as an Armenian, that such manner of drama and political maneuvering should continue into the present day, and stating that he shared from the heart the pain of the Turkish families and Muslim families as part of the process he called yüzleşme or Turkey's confronting its past.

Dink featured prominently in the 2006 genocide documentary film Screamers in which he explains:

"There are Turks who don't admit that their ancestors committed genocide. If you look at it though, they seem to be nice people... So why don't they admit it? Because they think that genocide is a bad thing which they would never want to commit, and because they can't believe their ancestors would do such a thing either."

Dink believed that diaspora Armenians should be able to live free of the weight of historical memory (the "residues of the past"), considering first and foremost the needs of the living majority (he said "eyes of the other side").

Indicating that a show of empathy would have nothing to do with accepting or refusing the genocide, Dink called for dialogue:

"Turkish-Armenian relations should be taken out of a 1915 meters-deep well."

By pointing out issues of rhetorical discourse that hampered Armenian-Turkish dialogue, he believed these obstacles could be overcome to the benefit of Turkish Armenians.

He was opposed to the French law that makes denial of Armenian genocide a crime. He was planning to go to France to commit this crime, when the law came into effect.

According to Dink, Agos helped the development of the Armenian community such that it helped triple the participation in the last Patriarchal elections, trained many journalists, became the community's face to Turkish society and cultivated many friends. He voiced his intention for an "Institute of Armenian Studies" in Istanbul. He tried to make it the democratic, opposition voice of Turkey, a voice used to inform the public of the injustices committed against the Armenian community. One of the major aims of the newspaper was to contribute to a dialogue between the Turkish and Armenian communities, as well as between Turkey and Armenia.

=== Policy view ===
Dink promoted a policy of wider integration of Turkish-Armenians into the wider Turkish society. Critical of state injustices, he often underlined the fact that a stronger Turkey would be achieved through the elimination of discrimination. Even after his conviction for speaking of the Armenian genocide, Dink continued to value his community, city, and country, noting often that his analysis and criticism was in the interest of strengthening the country. He concentrated on the mismanagement of community institutions, tried to promote obtaining rights through legal means, and was always open to compromise, once noting, "After all, Turkey is very reluctant to concede rights to its majority as well."

In his latest conference, held in Malatya Association of Entrepreneurs, Dink claimed that the Kurds were now falling in for the traps that the Armenians fell in the past. He stated that "English, Russian, German, and French are playing the same game again in this land. In the past, the Armenian people trusted them, thought they would rescue them from the cruelity [sic!] of the Ottoman. But they were wrong, because they finished their business and they left. And they left brothers of this land as enemies". He claimed that the US is now playing the same game, and this time Kurds are falling for it. He said "That is America. Comes, minds its own business, and when he is done, leaves. And then people here, scuffle within themselves".

== Prosecution for insulting Turkishness ==
Dink was prosecuted three times for "insulting Turkishness" under Article 301 of the Turkish Penal Code. He was acquitted the first time, convicted and received a suspended 6-month jail sentence the second time, which he had appealed at the European Court of Human Rights. At the time of his death, the prosecutor's office was preparing to press charges in a third case.

The first charge under the previous version of Article 301, then called Article 159, stemmed from a speech he delivered at a panel hosted by human rights NGO Mazlum-Der in Şanlıurfa on 14 February 2002. Speaking at the "Global Security, Terror and Human Rights, Multiculturalism, Minorities and Human Rights" panel, Dink and another speaker, lawyer Şehmus Ülek, faced charges for insulting Turkishness and the Republic. In the speech, Dink had stated:

"Since my childhood, I have been singing the national anthem along with you. Recently, there is a section where I cannot sing any longer and remain silent. You sing it, I join you later. It is: Smile at my heroic race... Where is the heroism of this race? We are trying to form the concept of citizenship on national unity and a heroic race. For example, if it were Smile at my hard-working people..., I would sing it louder than all of you, but it is not. Of the oath I am Turkish, honest and hard-working, I like the 'honest and hard-working' part and I shout it loudly. The I am Turkish part, I try to understand as I am from Turkey."

On 9 February 2006, Dink, and Şehmus Ülek, who stood trial for another speech at the same panel, were acquitted of all charges.

The second charge under 301 was pressed for Dink's article called "Getting to know Armenia" (13 February 2004), in which he suggested to diaspora Armenians that it was time to rid themselves of their enmity against Turks, a condition he considered himself free of, keeping himself emotionally healthy while at the same time knowing something of discrimination. His statement, "replace the poisoned blood associated with the Turk, with fresh blood associated with Armenia" resulted in a six-month suspended sentence.

Dink defended himself vigorously against the charges:

"This trial is based on a total misunderstanding," Dink told Reporters Without Borders. "I never meant to insult Turkish citizens. The term in question was taken out of context and is only symbolic. The real subject of the article is the Armenian diaspora who, once they have come to terms with the Turkish part of their identity, can seek new answers to their questions from independent Armenia.

In a February 2006 interview with the Committee to Protect Journalists (CPJ), Dink spoke about his 2005 conviction for insulting Turkishness in a criminal court:

"This is a political decision because I wrote about the Armenian genocide and they detest that, so they found a way to accuse me of insulting Turks."

In the same CPJ interview, he explained that while he had always been a target of Turkish nationalists, the past year had seen an increase in their efforts:

"The prosecutions are not a surprise for me. They want to teach me a lesson because I am Armenian. They try to keep me quiet."

His appeal of the ruling that found him guilty was rejected by a Turkish court in May 2006. Having exhausted internal appeal mechanisms, Dink appealed to the European Court of Human Rights for an overturn of the ruling on 15 January. The appeal suggests that Article 301 compromises freedom of expression and that Dink has been discriminated against because of his Armenian ethnicity. Dink's family has the right to decide whether or not to proceed with the appeal after his death.

In September 2006, another case was opened against Dink on charges of insulting Turkishness under Article 301, which Amnesty International considered to be "part of an emerging pattern of harassment against the journalist exercising his right to freedom of expression." The charge was brought against him by the Istanbul Prosecutor's Office after he referred to the 1915 massacre of Armenians in the Ottoman Empire as genocide during a 14 July 2006 interview with Reuters:

"Of course I'm saying it's a genocide, because its consequences show it to be true and label it so. We see that people who had lived on this soil for 4,000 years were exterminated by these events."

The charges were also leveled at Serkis Seropyan and Dink's son Arat Dink, as the holder of Agos's publishing license and executive editor, respectively. On 14 June 2007, the case against Hrant Dink was dropped due to his death, though proceedings for Serkis Seropyan and Arat Dink were scheduled for 18 July 2007.

In September 2010, the European Court of Human Rights found that Turkish authorities have violated Dink's freedom of speech (Article 10 ECHR) by criminal proceedings against him for allegedly insulting Turkishness and in reality, for criticizing the state institutions' denial of the view that the events of 1915 amounted to genocide.

== Assassination ==
Dink was assassinated in Istanbul around 12:00 GMT on 19 January 2007, as he returned to the offices of Agos. The killer was reported to have introduced himself as an Ankara University student who wanted to meet with Dink. When his request was rejected, he waited in front of a nearby bank for a while. According to eyewitnesses, Dink was shot by a man of 25 to 30 years of age, who fired three shots at Dink's head from the back at point blank range before fleeing the scene on foot. According to the police, the assassin was a man of 18 to 19 years of age. Two men had been taken into custody in the first hours of the police investigation, but were later released. Another witness, the owner of a restaurant near the Agos office, said the assassin looked about 20, wore jeans and a cap and shouted "I shot the infidel" as he left the scene. Hrant Dink's wife and daughter collapsed when they heard the news, and were taken to the hospital.

One week before his killing, Dink said, "This is an operation of the depth of the state to make me know my place".

=== Funeral ===
Dink's funeral service was held on 23 January 2007 in the Surp Asdvadzadzin Patriarchal Church in the Kumkapı neighborhood of Istanbul. Dink's funeral ceremony developed into a demonstration at which over 100,000 marched chanting "We are all Armenians". Along the way thousands of people leaned out of their office windows and threw flowers.

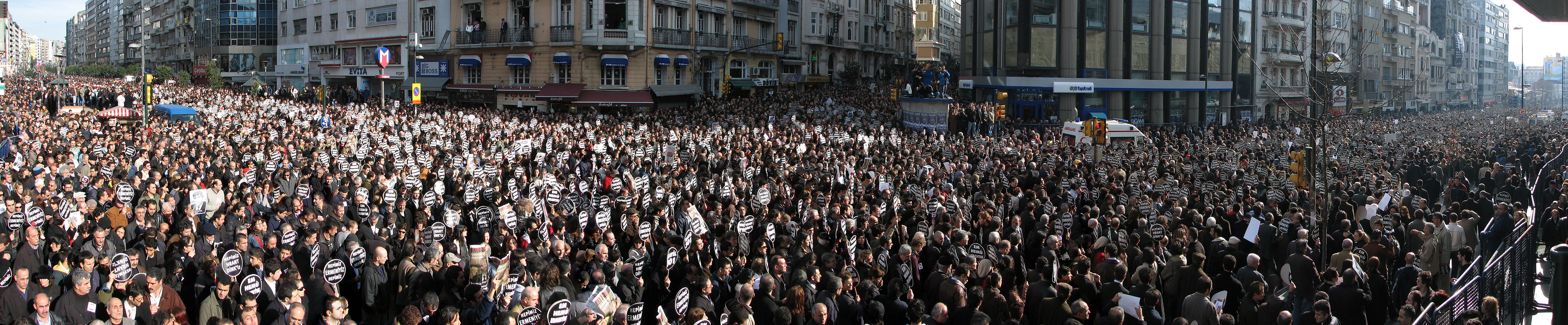
A panorama from Halaskargazi Boulevard in the Şişli district of Istanbul. Over 100,000 mourners marched in Dink's funeral, protesting his assassination. The office of the Agos newspaper, where Dink was gunned down, is near the right edge of the image; it is the first building to the right of the one with the large black banner.

=== Trial ===
The Dink murder trial opened in Istanbul on 2 July 2007. Eighteen people were charged at Istanbul Heavy Penal Court No 14 in connection with the journalist's assassination. Since the main suspect, Ogün Samast was younger than 18, the hearing was not public. Reportedly, the defendants Yasin Hayal and Erhan Tuncel repeated their testimonies given to the security forces and prosecutor. The court decided to release the defendants Osman Altay, Irfan Özkan, Salih Hacisalihoglu and Veysel Toprak to be tried without remand and adjourned the hearing to 1 October.

On 25 July 2011, Samast was convicted of premeditated murder and illegal possession of a firearm by Istanbul's Heavy Juvenile Criminal Court. He was sentenced to 22 years and 10 months in prison, and could be eligible for parole in 2021, after serving two thirds of his sentence. Another suspect, Yasin Hayal, was convicted of ordering the murder and was sentenced to life imprisonment.

In July 2014, the Turkish Supreme Court ruled that the investigation into the killing had been flawed, thus paving the way for trials of police officials and other public authorities. In the pursuit of this case hearings were held, and in January 2017 Ali Fuat Yılmazer, the former head of Turkey's police intelligence branch, gave testimony that the killing was "deliberately not prevented" and security authorities in Istanbul and Trabzon were responsible.

The trials, based on two indictments dated 2015 and 2017 charging a total of 78 defendants, lingered on for several years. The 14th Heavy Penal Court in Istanbul finally issued its verdict during the 130th hearing on 26 March 2021. Former police chiefs Yılmazer and Ramazan Akyürek were issued life sentences for premeditated murder. 26 defendants were sentenced to jail for various periods, while others were either acquitted or their judicial cases were separated from the murder trial. An appeals court upheld most of the rulings on 5 May 2022, as 11 defendants were still in prison as part of the judicial process.

The family of Dink released a statement on 26 March 2021, announcing that the verdicts "could be able to convince neither themselves nor the public," while their lawyer stressed that several public officials who took part in the murder were not even put on trial.

After serving 16 years and 10 months of his prison sentence of 22 years and 10 months, Samast was released on parole "for good behaviour" on 15 November 2023.

On the 6th of December, an Istanbul court imposed an international travel ban on Samast. The next week, on December 13, Samast applied for a name change, saying "At a young age, I got involved in a grave incident. As a result, I face difficulties within society. I cannot find peace; I want to be forgotten". His proposed name was widely circulated in the Turkish press.

=== Dink v. Turkey ===
In 2011 the European Court of Human Rights ruled that Turkey had failed to protect Hrant Dink's life and freedom of expression. He had received death threats from ultranationalists after writing articles concerning Turkish-Armenian identity, the Armenian origins of one of Atatürk's adopted daughters and the role of Turkey in the genocide of Armenians during World War I.

== Awards ==
- 2005 Ayşenur Zarakolu Award for Freedom of Thought and Expression, awarded by the Turkish Human Rights Association in Turkey
- 2006 Henri Nannen Prize for Freedom of the Press by Gruner + Jahr, publisher of Stern in Germany
- 2006 Oxfam/Novib PEN Award for Freedom of Expression by Oxfam Novib in Netherlands
- 2006 Bjørnson Prize by The Norwegian Academy of Literature and Freedom of Expression in Norway
- 2007 Armenian Presidential State Prize, citing Dink's contribution to "restoration of historical justice, mutual understanding between peoples, freedom of speech, and protection of human rights."
- 2007 (posthumous) Hermann Kesten Medal for outstanding efforts in support of persecuted writers
- 2007 International Press Institute World Press Freedom Hero

Taner Akçam's 2012 book The Young Turks' Crime Against Humanity is dedicated to Dink and to Vahakn Dadrian.

The Hrant Dink Foundation now hosts an annual Hrant Dink Award ceremony to recognize other human rights activists.

== Legacy ==
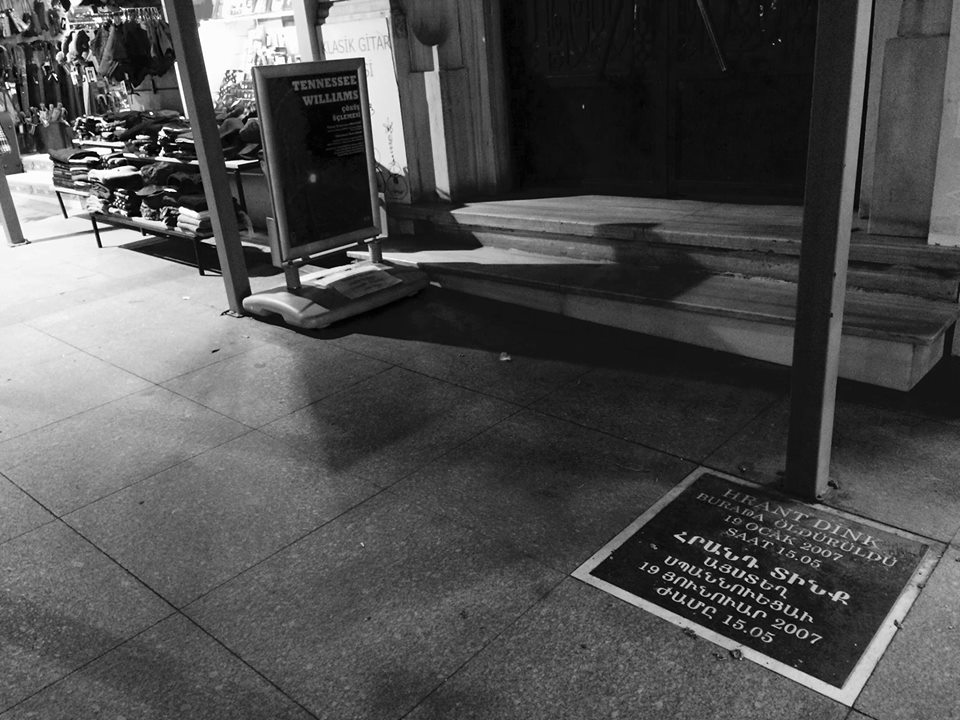
Plaque outside Agos' office in honor of Hrant Dink

According to Vicken Cheterian,

It was the courage of Hrant Dink that transformed this struggle [over the Armenian genocide] into an internal debate within Turkey. For a decade he engaged Turkish public opinion and the intellectual class, questioning their silence. He paid the highest price for his daring; he was threatened, harassed, and eventually murdered. Yet, he won. He succeeded in making the Armenian genocide a Turkish issue, a debate necessary for freedom of expression, of justice and democratisation inside Turkey.

== See also ==
- Agos
- Anti-Armenianism
- Armenian genocide
- Armenian genocide denial
- Armenian genocide recognition
- List of journalists killed in Turkey
- Attempted assassination of Pope John Paul II
- Ararat (film) 2002 film directed, written, and co-produced by Canadian Atom Egoyan about the Armenian genocide
- Conscience Films
- Recep Küpçü, Bulgarian poet and writer of Turkish origin
