= Conscience Films =

Short film competition

Conscience Films (also known as Vicdan Filmleri in Turkish, and Խղճմտանքի Ֆիլմեր in Armenian) is a short film competition organized by the Hrant Dink Foundation. The competition was founded in memory of Hrant Dink. According to Dença Kartun, the project coordinator at the Hrant Dink Foundation for the Films about Conscience project, words by the assassinated Armenian-Turkish journalist inspired the project. "The voice of conscience has been sentenced to silence. Now, that conscience is searching for a way out," said Dink, who was killed on Jan. 19, 2007. The participants are asked to make a short movie of at most five minutes on the topic of looking at the world through our conscience. The winning movies are determined by the votes of international jury members. Both professional and amateur filmmakers are invited to submit their short movies.

== 2010 Competition ==
The jury in 2010 consisted of Costa Gavras, Georges Moustaki, Harutyun Khachatryan, İbrahim Betil, Lale Mansur, Nebahat Akkoç, Ömer Madra, Rakel Dink, Rela Mazali, Serge Avedikian, Serra Yılmaz, Vaughan Pilikian, and Yıldırım Türker. The first edition of the project, attracted a total of 107 short films from various countries including Britain, France, Germany and USA as well as Turkey and Armenia. The movies were screened at the Istanbul, Tunceli, and Gaziantep film festivals. After those screenings, 19 of those movies elected by the jury met the audience in Yerevan, capital of Armenia. The short films were shown within the scope of Yerevan International Film Festival in July 2011.

=== 2010 Results ===
The 21 best movies as determined by the jury:

Rank	English Title	Original Title	Filmmaker
1	Duty	Görev	Cem Mansuroğlu
2	The Other	Öteki	Maral Kerovpyan
3	The Two Faces of Conscience	Vicdanın İki Yüzü	Özgür Oto
4	Why	İnçu/Neden	Sayat Dağlıyan
5	The Kids who Played Tambourine	Tef Çalan Çocukla	Melek Ulagay Taylan
6	Ancestral Memories		Eliano Rossi
7	Perpetrators and Unidentifieds	Failler ve Meçhulle	Burkay Doğan
8 (tie)	Constantly Tough Silent: F	Sürekli Sert Sessiz: F	Özlem İdil
8 (tie)	Wake up!		Jochen Menzel
8 (tie)	I live in Paris	Je vis à Paris	Armağan Uslu
8 (tie)	Hope	Umut	Selin Süar
9	We have seen this from our Mountains, Birds And Children!	Biz Dağlarımızdan, Kuşlarımızdan Ve Çocuklarımızdan Bunu Gördük!	Engin Yıldız
10 (tie)	Where The Rose Blooms	Gülün Bittiği Yer	Selman Pınarlı
10 (tie)	Outside	Dışarıda	Duygu Teser
11	The Tigris	Dicle	Seren Gel
12		Hêviyek Nû	Hasan Akgül
13 (tie)	Stain	Leke	Gökhan Evecen
13 (tie)	Inflamed!	Tutuşan!	Vedat Esen
14 (tie)	The Border	Sınır	Gizem Gen
14 (tie)	The Forgotten Monastery		Gagik Karagheuzian
14 (tie)	BalanCe	BalanSe	Serdar Koçak

== 2011 Competition ==
The jury for films about conscience 2011 has been appointed. The new jury consists of Arsinee Khanjian, Costa Gavras, Cüneyt Cebenoyan, Ferzan Özpetek, Hale Soygazi, Nadje Al-Ali, Rakel Dink, and Serge Avedikian. The deadline for film submission is October 15, 2011. A special DVD will include the top 20 movies selected by the jury, and the producer of the top film will be awarded with a scholarship by the Hrant Dink Foundation.
