= Mıgırdiç Margosyan =

Turkish writer (1938–2022)

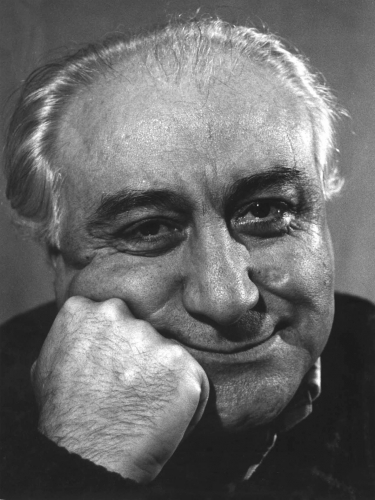
- Born: 23 December 1938; Diyarbakır, Turkey
- Died: 2 April 2022 (aged 83)
- Education: Getronagan Armenian High School; Istanbul University
- Occupations: Author, writer, novelist

Mıgırdiç Margosyan (23 December 1938 – 2 April 2022) was a Turkish-Armenian writer.

== Background ==
Margosyan was born on 23 December 1938 in the Hançepek district of Diyarbakır, Turkey. He received his primary education at the Süleyman Nazif Elementary School and the Ziya Gökalp Middle School in Diyarbakır, and continued his secondary education at the Armenian community schools in Istanbul, attending Bezciyan Middle School and Getronagan Armenian High School. Margosyan received his college degree from the Philosophy Department of the Faculty of Letters at Istanbul University.

Between 1966 and 1972, Margosyan worked as the school director of the Surp Haç Tıbrevank Armenian High School and also taught philosophy, psychology, Armenian language, and literature. Later, he left teaching and started commercial activities.

== Writing career ==
Margosyan published a number of short stories in Armenian at the Marmara newspaper. Some of these were later collected and published under the name Mer Ayt Goğmeri (Turkish: Bizim Oralar) (1984) by a small circle of intellectuals that included Margosyan and Yetvart Tomasyan. In 1988 Margosyan received the Eliz Kavukcuyan Literature Award for authors writing in Armenian in Paris, France. In 1993, Margosyan, Tomasyan, and Hrant Dink founded Aras Publishing, which became the only publishing house in Turkey that published books in Western Armenian. Margosyan published Gavur Mahallesi (1992), Söyle Margos Nerelisen? (1995) and Biletimiz İstanbul'a Kesildi (1998) in Turkish and in 1999 published his second book, Dikrisi Aperen in Armenian. His book Gavur Mahallesi was translated into Kurdish and published in 1999 with the title Li ba me, Li wan deran by Avesta Publishing in Istanbul. Margosyan's articles for the daily Evrensel were published under the name Çengelliiğne in 1999. Margosyan continued to write for Evrensel under the column Kirveme Mektuplar, which was published in a 2006 book of the same name. His last book, an autobiographical novel called Tespih Taneleri, was published in 2006.

== Death ==
Margosyan died on 4 April 2022. On 7 April, he was interred at Şişli Armenian Cemetery.
