= Camp Armen =

- Armenian: Արմէն ճամբար Turkish: Kamp Armen
- Alternative names: Tuzla Armenian Orphanage; Tuzla Armenian Children's Camp; Kamp Armen

General information
- Type: Orphanage
- Location: Tuzla, Istanbul, Turkey
- Coordinates: 40°49′26.6″N 29°16′55.9″E
- Year built: 1963-1968
- Groundbreaking: 1962 (First one); 2023 (Second one)
- Construction started: 1963
- Demolished: 2015 (partially); 2017 (fully, by land owners)
- Owner: Gedikpaşa Armenian Protestant Church

Technical details
- Floor count: First one: 2
- Grounds: 8.552 m²

Camp Armen or also known as Tuzla Armenian Orphanage (Armenian: Արմէն ճամբար, Turkish: Kamp Armen, Tuzla Ermeni Yetimhanesi) is an Armenian orphanage in the Tuzla district of Istanbul. It is owned by the Gedikpaşa Armenian Protestant Church.

== History ==
In the 1950s, Hrant Küçükgüzelyan, head of the Gedikpaşa Armenian Protestant Church Foundation, travelled across Anatolia to find Armenian children who lacked access to education in Armenian. He brought them to Istanbul, where they attended the İncirdibi Armenian Protestant School and lived on the ground floor of the Gedikpaşa Armenian Protestant Church, which had been converted into an orphanage. Known to the children as "Baron", Küçükgüzelyan covered their educational and living expenses. During the summer holidays, the children returned to their families. This was to enable them to keep up their use of the Armenian language, in which they had little chance of speaking during the school year. Among the children who grew up at the orphanage was Hrant Dink, who went on to found Turkish–Armenian newspaper Agos. He met his future wife, Rakel, at the camp, where they grew up together.

As the number of children increased, the church sought a larger site where they could stay during the summer holidays.

In 1958, Küçükgüzelyan proposed establishing a summer camp for Armenian children to the managing board of the Gedikpaşa Armenian Protestant Church Foundation. After the proposal was approved, several locations in Istanbul, including Kandilli, Beykoz and Tuzla, were considered. Tuzla was ultimately chosen because land there was more affordable. The foundation applied to the Istanbul Governor's Office and the General Directorate of Foundations for permission to purchase approximately one hectare of land. After a ten-month approval process, the land was purchased and registered in the foundation's name.

Construction of the camp began in January 1962. Initially, 13 children aged between 8 and 12 travelled from Gedikpaşa to Tuzla, where they lived in Red Crescent tents while helping to build the camp. Work continued over the following years. According to Garabet Orunöz, who arrived at the camp in 1967, the second floor had been completed by that time, although the site lacked electricity and water had to be pumped from a well. As the camp saw an increase in the number children, improvements were made to its water supply and grounds.

In 1974, properties belonging to minority foundations were seized by authorities due to Turkey's political atmosphere which was affected by political activities outside the country. The land of the camp was one of those properties.

Following the 1980 coup d'état, Küçükgüzelyan was tried on charges of training Armenian militants at the camp and spent eight and a half months in prison. After his release, he left Turkey for France, and did not return for 25 years. Dink managed the camp during its final three years of operation.

Over the course of its operation, Camp Armen housed approximately 1,500 children. The camp was closed in 1983 and the land of the orphanage was confiscated by the state before it was returned to its former owners. Legal remedies were tried for the return of the camp, and the lawsuits filed for the payment of compensation for the facilities built on the land were also inconclusive.

The camp was the subject of an exhibit by the Turkish Human Rights Association in 1996, the materials from which were published in book form in 2000, with a foreword by Orhan Pamuk and an afterword by Hrant Dink. In 2001 the camp grounds were sold to a local businessman who intended to build a house on the site until Dink contacted him and let him know that the land had belonged to an orphanage. The businessman offered to donate the land back, but the law at the time did not permit it.

In 2011, with the amendment made to the Law on Foundations, the process of returning the confiscated properties of minority foundations was initiated and applications were made again, but no compensation was paid.

Plans of the orphanage being demolished to make room for more luxury housing surfaced on the news in April 2015.

=== Demolition ===
Demolition works started on the camp on the morning of 6 May 2015, with reactions coming from Armenian foundations and activist groups based in Istanbul soon after. While the restitution negotiations were ongoing, Nor Zartonk and Kamp Arman Solidarity started a protest against the demolition of the camp. A Change.org campaign and a march were organized for the restitution, contributing heavily to the halt of demolition operations although the subcontracted workers who came to demolish the orphanage quit when they heard the story of the orphanage.

The protests also drew support from politicians, including HDP MP Erol Dora, who visited the site in May 2015, and Filiz Kerestecioğlu, Sezai Temelli and Garo Paylan, who took part in demonstrations calling for the property's return. Meanwhile, negotiations involving the land owner, representatives of Armenian civil society organisations and politicians continued. Following a request by AKP MP Markar Esayan, then prime minister Ahmet Davutoğlu intervened in the process.

On the 175th day of the protest, Fatih Ulusoy, who appeared as the owner of the land by law, donated the property to the Gedikpaşa Armenian Protestant Church Foundation. Ulusoy, who had also requested the orphanage to be demolished due to its risk of collapse later stated that he felt no remorse for it as he did not know the history of the camp. The rest of the camp, which was expropriated by Tuzla Municipality, was requested to be returned.

The first orphanage was completely demolished on 8 April 2017 for the construction of the new one.

=== Reconstruction plans ===
In December 2017, the Istanbul Metropolitan Municipality Parliament removed the "administrative facility" annotation on the land of the camp and declared it a "social and cultural facility area".

On 19 January 2021, in line with the unanimous decision of the Istanbul Metropolitan Municipality Parliament, the plan amendment regarding the area of the orphanage was approved and work began on the reconstruction of the camp. Preparatory work began in 2022, and the foundation stone for the new Camp Armen was laid in November 2023. The project was intended to include a dormitory that could accommodate 100 people, a cultural centre, a library, classrooms, multipurpose halls and an auditorium. A memorial centre was also planned to document the history of the orphanage.

Construction was halted in October 2025 due to lack of funding. Kirkor Ağabaloğlu, spiritual leader of the Gedikpaşa Armenian Protestant Church, attributed the funding problems to a decline in donations following the death of Zaven Khanjian, a major supporter of the project based in the United States. According to Ağabaloğlu, those who succeeded Khanjian did not provide the same level of support, resulting in a shortage of funds.

In July 2026, Ağabaloğlu called on Tuzla Municipality to provide financial assistance to enable construction to resume.
