= Boxer (magazine) =

Turkish men's magazine

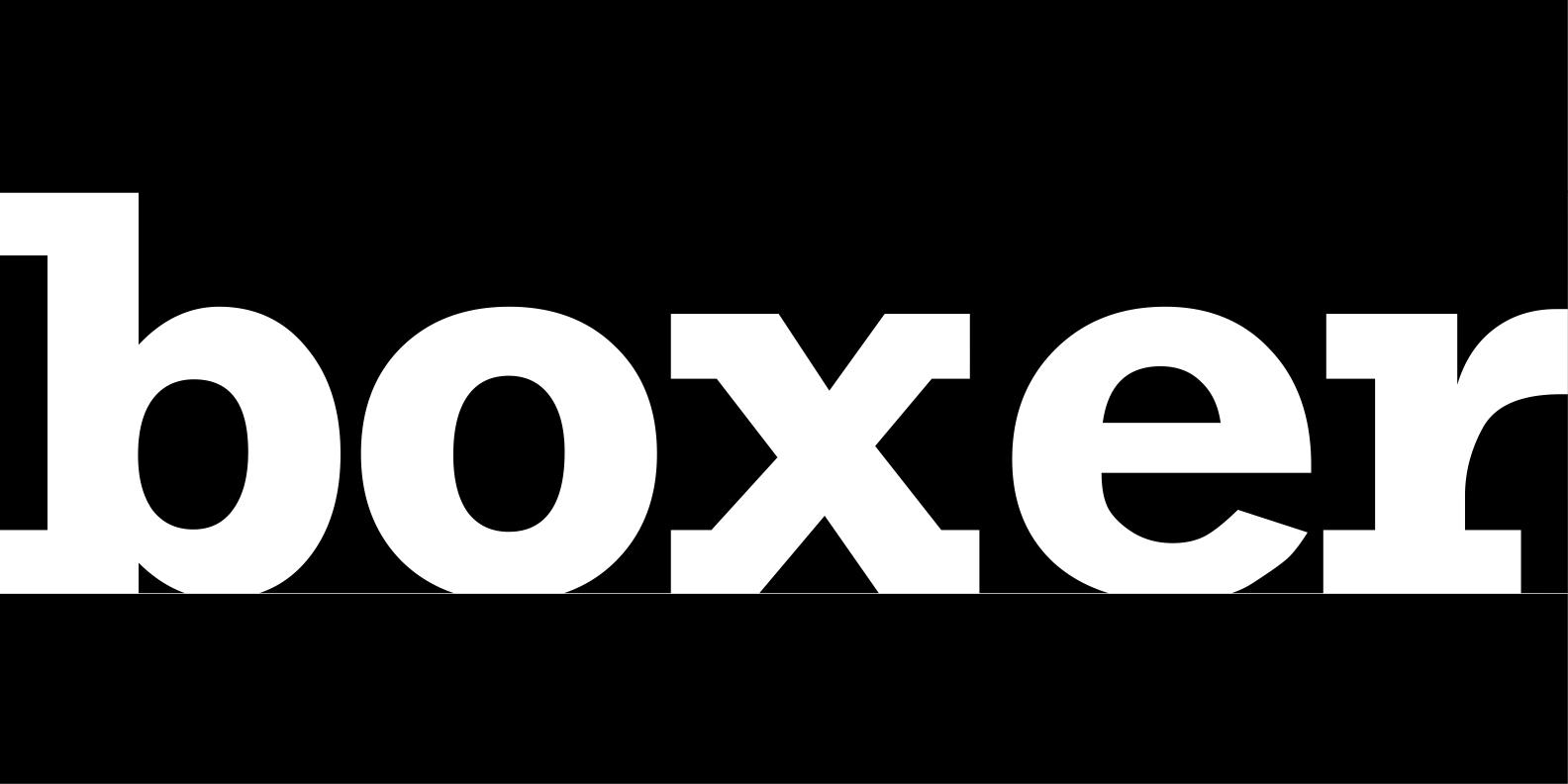
- Editor in Chief: Emir Ekşioğlu
- Categories: Men's
- First issue: July 2004
- Final issue: December 2013 (print)
- Country: Turkey
- Based in: Istanbul
- Language: Turkish
- Website: www.boxerdergisi.tv
- ISSN: 1304-9364

Boxer is a Turkish men's magazine published in print between July 2004 and December 2013. It was the highest selling and most respectable men's magazine in the country for a while followed by Turkish editions of FHM, GQ and Esquire magazines.

== History and profile ==
Boxer was established by Turkish journalist Zafer Mutlu in 2004. The magazine was part of the Vatan magazine group until 2012 when it was acquired by the Japanese media group The Nikkei. The last issue published in print was in December 2013.

The magazine was later bought by Emir Ekşioğlu, who used to write for the magazine for a brief period, from The Nikkei in January 2016. Ekşioğlu has also assumed the role of Editor in Chief. The magazine became digital only in September 2016 and it is a part of Boxer MG. The magazine is known for its interviews and photo shootings.
