= Salihe Aydeniz =

Kurdish politician (born 1973)

Salihe Aydeniz MP
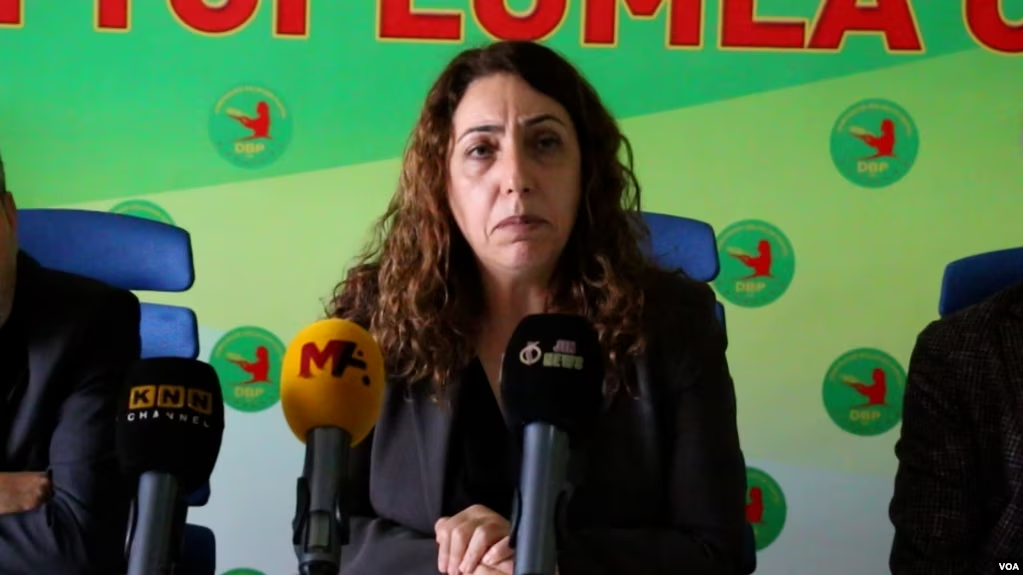

Member of the Grand National Assembly of Turkey
- Incumbent
- Assumed office 24 June 2018
- Constituency: Diyarbakır (2018); Mardin (2023)

Co-Chair of the Democratic Regions Party
- Incumbent
- Assumed office December 2019
- Preceded by: Sebahat Tuncel

Personal details
- Born: 1973 (age 52–53) Ergani, Diyarbakır
- Party: Peoples' Equality and Democracy Party (DBP)
- Other political affiliations: HDP

Salihe Aydeniz (born 1973, Ergani, Turkey) is a Kurdish politician of the Democratic Regions Party (DBP) and a current member of the Grand National Assembly of Turkey. Since November 2019, she is the co-chair of the DBP.

== Education and early life ==
Aydeniz received her primary education in Ergani, Diyarbakır and graduated as a nurse from the health institute in Diyarbakır, going on to work as a nurse in Dargeçit, Mardin. She has presided over the Trade Union of Public Employees in Health and Social Services and been a member of the Democratic Society Congress (DTK).

== Political career ==
Aydeniz was elected to the Grand National Assembly of Turkey representing the HDP for Diyarbakır in the Parliamentary Election in June 2018. On 30 November 2019, she assumed as a Co-Chair of HDPs sister-party, the DBP, following which she left the HDP. With her membership of the DBP, the party became the tenth party represented in the Turkish parliament. As an MP she is a proponent of a political solution to the Kurdish-Turkish conflict and has said that the Turkish opposition should take a more constructive approach to Kurdish demands in relation to Kurdish language and culture. She rarely goes to Ankara, saying that little can be achieved there: the questions on the human rights situation in Turkish Kurdistan that are submitted to parliament seldom meet with an answer.

In the 2023 Turkish parliamentary election she was elected in Mardin.

=== Legal prosecution ===
After a march in support of Abdullah Öcalan, the leader of the Kurdistan Workers' Party (PKK) in Kadıköy, she punched a police officer while the officer was only standing. After that she was accused of having pushed a police officer and taking part in a march without permission following which a motion was prepared to end her legislative immunity.

== Personal life ==
She is married and has two children.
