= Yolağzı, Silopi =

Village in Şırnak Province, Turkey

Yolağzı
- Village
- Location within Turkey
- Coordinates: 37.291°N 42.408°E
- Country: Turkey
- Province: Şırnak
- District: Silopi
- Population (2023): 59
- Time zone: UTC+3 (TRT)

Yolağzı (Kurdish: Girkûndan) is a village in the Silopi District of Şırnak Province in Turkey. The village had a population of 59 in 2023.

== Population ==
Historical population figures of the village:

Historical population
Year	Pop.	±%
1935	160	—
1965	534	+233.8%
1980	349	−34.6%
1990	385	+10.3%
2000	0	−100.0%
2010	0	0.00%
2019	29	—
2023	59	+103.4%

== Notable people ==
- Rakel Dink
