= Tülin Özen =

Turkish actress

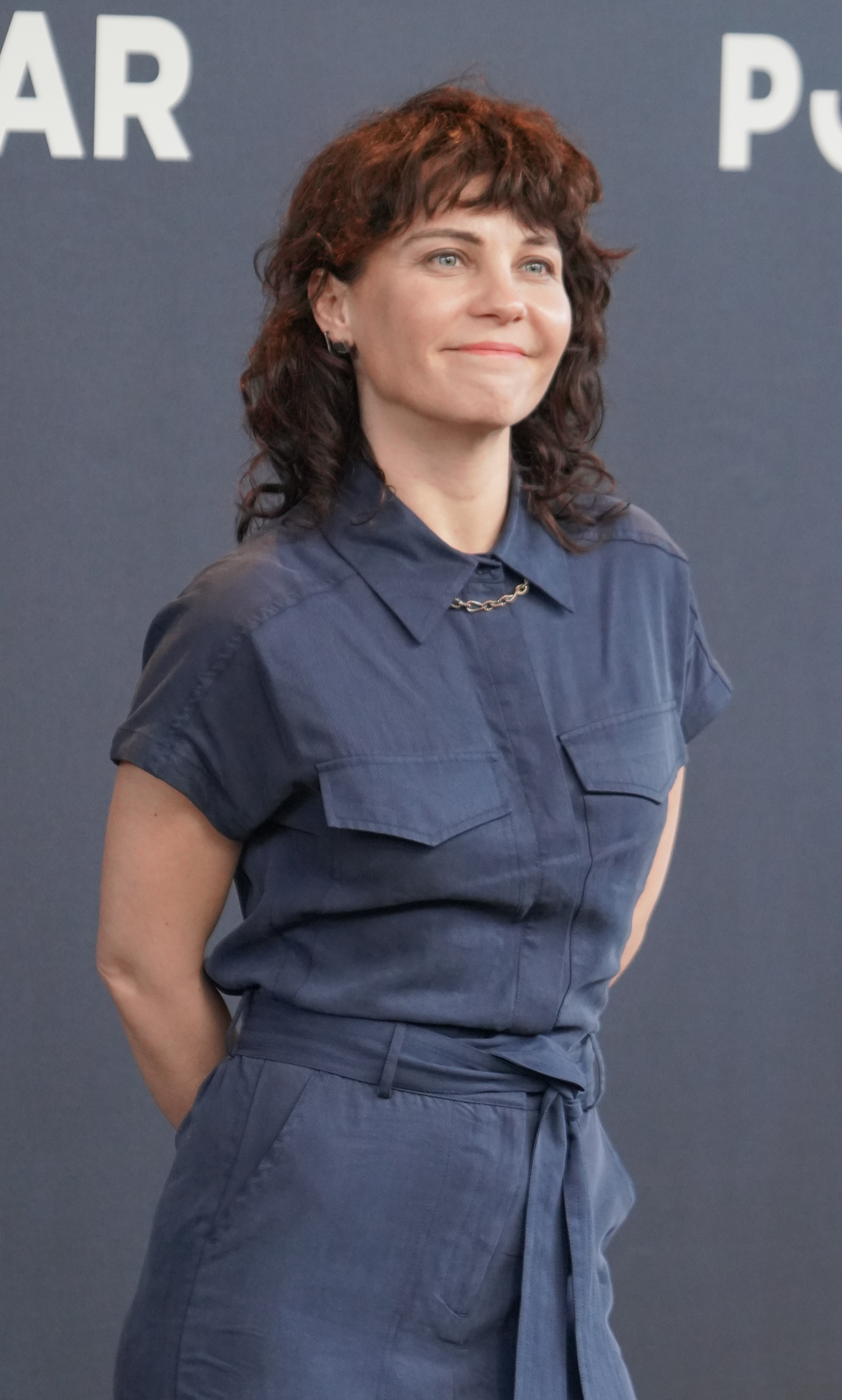
- 2024.
- Born: İskenderun, Turkey
- Education: Istanbul Technical University; Yeditepe University
- Occupation: Actress
- Years active: 2003–present

Tülin Özen is a Turkish actress. She has appeared in more than twenty films since 2003.

== Theatre ==
- Sersemler Evi
- Güzel Şeyler Bizim Tarafta
- Dil Kuşu
- Vahşet Tanrısı

== Filmography ==
Short Film
Year	Title	Role	Note
2007	Yarın geçti		
2008	Yapayalnız		
2018	Şiir Saklayan Çocuk	Anne	
2019	App	Nisan Dağdeviren	
Film
Year	Title	Role	Note
2003	Melek Oyunu		
2005	Meleğin Düşüşü		
2007	Yumurta	Sahaftaki Kadın	
2008	Süt	Peasant girl	
2008	Vicdan	Songül	
2010	Bal	Zehra	
2012	Yük	Zeynep	
2013	Mavi Dalga		
2013	Karnaval	Demet	
2014	Gülümse		
2014	Pek Yakında	Arzu	
2015	Abluka	Meral	
2017	Kötü Çocuk		
2020	Karakomik Filmler 2	Nuray	
2023	Hesitation Wound	Canan	
2025	Dump of Untitled Pieces	Sema	
Web Series
Year	Title	Role	Note
2017	Masum	Emel	BluTv original series
2020	Karanlık Bölge	Yaz Saymazoğlu	Podbee podcast series
2020	Bir Başkadır	Gülbin	Netflix original series
Tv Series
Year	Title	Role	Note
2004	En Son Babalar Duyar		
2004	Aynalar		
2005–2007	Beyaz Gelincik	Meryemce	
2006	Rüya Gibi		
2008	Cennetin Çocukları	Cennet	
2010	Kapalı Çarşı	Seher	
2011	Üsküdar'a Giderken	Ayşe	
2011	Bizim Yenge	Zeyno	
2012	Yalan Dünya	(guest role)	
2013	Aldırma Gönül	Gönül	
2015–2016	Muhteşem Yüzyıl: Kösem	Handan Sultan	
2017	Aşk ve Gurur		
2017–2018	Ufak Tefek Cinayetler	Arzu	
2020–2021	Kırmızı Oda	Doctor Piraye	

== Award ==
Awards and nominations
Year	Award	Category	Work	Result
2004	International Antalya Film Festival	Best Actress	Angel's Fall	Won
2005	Nürnberg Turkey/Germany Film Festival	Best Actress	Angel's Fall	Won
2005	Ankara Film Festival	Best Actress	Angel's Fall	Won
2008	Sadri Alışık Awards	Best Supporting Actress	Vicdan	Won
2009	Adana Altin Koza Film Festival	Best Supporting Actress	Vicdan	Won
2009	Siyad Awards	Best Supporting Actress	Vicdan	Won
2016	İstanbul Gelişim University Media Awards	Best Theater Actress	Abluka	Won
2016	6th Ayaklı Newspaper Awards	Best Supporting Actress in a Historical Series	Muhteşem Yüzyıl: Kösem	Nominated
