= Mardin (electoral district) =

Electoral district for the Grand National Assembly of Turkey

- electoral district for the Grand National Assembly of Turkey
- Mardin shown within Turkey
- Province: Mardin
- Electorate: 542.046

Current electoral district
- Created: 1920
- Seats: 6 Historical: 5 (1991-1995) 6 (1987-1991) 5 (1983-1987) 6 (1961-1983) 8 (1957-1961) 7 (1954-1957)
- MPs: List: Salihe Aydeniz DEM Party Kamuran Tanhan DEM Party Beri̇tan Güneş Altin DEM Party George Aslan DEM Party Faruk Kiliç AK Party Muhammed Adak AK Party
- Turnout at last election: 82.39%
- Representation
- DEM: 4 / 6
- AK Party: 2 / 6

Mardin is an electoral district of the Grand National Assembly of Turkey. It elects six members of parliament (deputies) to represent the province of the same name for a four-year term by the D'Hondt method, a party-list proportional representation system.

== Members ==
Population reviews of each electoral district are conducted before each general election, which can lead to certain districts being granted a smaller or greater number of parliamentary seats. Mardin's seat allocation has varied little over the last sixty years, keeping around the six seats it has today.

MPs for Mardin, 1999 onwards
Seat	1999 (21st parliament)	2002 (22nd parliament)	2007 (23rd parliament)	2011 (24th parliament)	June 2015 (25th parliament)	November 2015 (26th parliament)	2018 (27th parliament)
1	Fehim Adak; Virtue	Selahattin Cebeli; AK Party	Gönül Bekin Şahkulubey; AK Party		Orhan Miroğlu; AK Party	Mithat Sancar; HDP	Mithat Sancar; HDP
2	Metin Musaoğlu; DYP	Nihat Eri; AK Party	Cüneyt Yüksel; AK Party	Abdurrahim Akdağ; AK Party	Mithat Sancar; HDP	Erol Dora; HDP	Pero Dundar; HDP
3	Veysi Şahin; DYP	Mehmet Beşir Hamidi; AK Party	Mehmet Halit Demir; AK Party	Muammer Güler; AK Party	Mehmet Ali Aslan; HDP	Gülser Yıldırım; HDP	Ebru Günay; HDP
4	Süleyman Çelebi; Motherland	Mahmut Duyan; CHP	Süleyman Çelebi; AK Party	Erol Dora; Independent (BDP) / HDP		Ali Atalan; HDP	Tuma Çelik; HDP
5	Ömer Ertaş; Motherland	Muharrem Doğan; CHP	Ahmet Türk; DTP / Independent		Enise Güneyli; HDP	Orhan Miroğlu; AK Party	Şeyhmus Dinçel; AK Party
6	Mustafa Kemal Tuğmaner; DSP	Süleyman Bölünmez; Independent'	Emine Ayna; Independent (DTP)	Gülser Yıldırım; Independent (DTP/BDP) / HDP		Ceyda Bölünmez Çankırı; AK Party	Cengiz Demirkaya; AK Party

== General elections ==
=== 2011 ===
Unelected candidates in small text.

2011 Turkish general election: Mardin
Party	Candidate	Votes	%	±%
AK Party	Muammer Güler, Gönül Bekin Şahkulubey, Abdurrahim Akdağ	103,402	32.17	
Independent	Ahmet Türk	59,350	18.52	
Independent	Gülser Yıldırım	55,505	17.32	
Independent	Erol Dora	51,980	16.22	
Independent	Süleyman Bölünmez	28,746	8.97	
CHP	None elected	11,953	3.72	
Büyük Birlik	None elected	2842	0.88	
HAS Party	None elected	2097	0.65	N/A
MHP	None elected	2041	0.64	
SAADET	None elected	895	0.28	
DP	None elected	845	0.26	
DSP	None elected	658	0.20	'"`UNIQ−−ref−0000000E−QINU`"'
TKP	None elected	474	0.15	
Nationalist Conservative	None elected	240	0.07	
MP	None elected	234	0.07	
Liberal Democrat	None elected	129	0.04	
DYP	None elected	0		
HEPAR	None elected	0		
Labour	None elected	0		
Turnout		321,391	82.39	

=== June 2015 ===
Abbr.	Party	Votes	%
HDP	Peoples' Democratic Party	276,920	73.3%
AK Party	Justice and Development Party	72,645	19.2%
HÜDA-PAR	Free Cause Party	5,312	1.4%
MHP	Nationalist Movement Party	4,198	1.1%
CHP	Republican People's Party	3,736	1%
	Other	15,212	4%
Total		378.023	
Turnout		87.30%	
source: YSK

=== November 2015 ===
Abbr.	Party	Votes	%
HDP	Peoples' Democratic Party	258,384	68.4%
AK Party	Justice and Development Party	107,804	28.5%
CHP	Republican People's Party	5,087	1.3%
MHP	Nationalist Movement Party	2,959	0.8%
	Other	3,733	1%
Total		377,967	
Turnout		86.53%	
source: YSK

=== 2018 ===
Abbr.	Party	Votes	%
HDP	Peoples' Democratic Party	233,657	60.6%
AK Party	Justice and Development Party	113,634	29.5%
CHP	Republican People's Party	10,915	2.8%
MHP	Nationalist Movement Party	9,387	2.4%
HÜDA-PAR	Free Cause Party	8,253	2.1%
IYI	Good Party	3,952	1%
SP	Felicity Party	3,151	0.8%
	Other	2,232	0.6%
Total		385,281	
Turnout		84.10%	
source: YSK

=== 2023 ===
Abbr.	Party	Votes	%
YSGP	Party of Greens and the Left Future	244.036	54.4%
AK Party	Justice and Development Party	112.572	25.1%
CHP	Republican People's Party	31.993	7.1%
	Independent	22.340	5%
MHP	Nationalist Movement Party	15.572	3.5%
IYI	Good Party	5.362	1.2%
YRP	New Welfare Party	5.037	1.1%
	Other	10.243	2.3%
Total		448.603	
Turnout		82.76%	
source: YSK

== Presidential elections ==
=== 2014 ===
Presidential Election 2014: Mardin
Party	Candidate	Votes	%
HDP	Selahattin Demirtaş	198,542	60.90
AK Party	Recep Tayyip Erdoğan	119,362	36.61
Independent	Ekmeleddin İhsanoğlu	8,094	2.48
Total votes		325,998	100.00
Rejected ballots		3,845	1.17
Turnout		329,843	76.45
Selahattin Demirtaş win			
