= Angel's Fall =

2005 Turkish drama film

- Theatrical release poster
- Directed by: Semih Kaplanoğlu
- Produced by: Semih Kaplanoglu; Lilette Botassi
- Starring: Tülin Özen; Budak Akalin
- Edited by: Ayhan Ergursel; Kaplanoglu; Suzan Hande Guneri
- Release date: 4 February 2005
- Running time: 98 minutes
- Country: Turkey
- Language: Turkish

Angel's Fall (Turkish: Meleğin Düşüşü) is a 2005 Turkish-Greek drama film directed by Semih Kaplanoğlu.

== Cast ==
- Tülin Özen as Zeynep
- Budak Akalin as Selçuk
- Musa Karagöz as Müfit
- Engin Dogan as Mustafa
- Yeşim Ceren Bozoğlu as Funda
- Can Kolukisa
