= Ebru Günay =

Kurdish politician (born 1982)

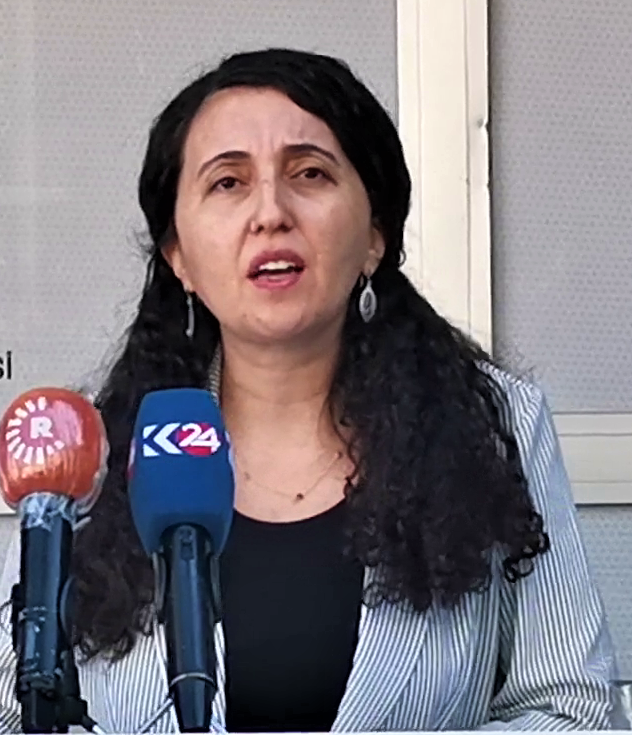

Member of the Grand National Assembly of Turkey
- Incumbent
- Assumed office June 2018

Personal details
- Born: 1 January 1982 (age 44) Bingöl, Bingöl Province, Turkey
- Citizenship: Turkish
- Party: HDP

Ebru Günay (born 1 January 1982, Bingöl, Turkey) is a Kurdish jurist and a politician of the Peoples' Democratic Party (HDP). She was elected a member of the Grand National Assembly of Turkey in 2018 and is currently the spokeswoman of the HDP.

== Education and professional career ==
Ebru Güney studied law at the Dicle University, from which she graduated in 2006. Following she worked at the Asrin Law Firm, and was involved in the defense of Abdullah Öcalan. She also obtained an MSc in human rights law from the Bilgi University in Istanbul.

=== Legal prosecution ===
Ebru Güney was arrested due to an investigation into the activities of the Kurdistan Communities Union (KCK) in 2009 and prosecuted during the KCK-trial in which the defendants were accused of supporting a terrorist organization. She was released pending trial after five years in April 2014. In September 2019, the Turkish Supreme Appeals court confirmed her acquittal in the KCK main case in which initially more than 150 people were prosecuted.

== Political career ==
Ebru Güney was elected to the Turkish Parliament representing the HDP for Mardin in the parliamentary elections of June 2018 and is the current spokeswoman for the HDP. She supports that Kurds can be educated in their native language if they wish and condemns the Turkish denial of Kurds.

=== Spokeswoman of the HDP ===
Ebru Güney declared the HDPs opposition to Recep Tayyip Erdoğan denial of Selahattin Demirtaş' release from prison or called for snap elections in October 2020. Following the widely perceived You Tube revelations by the Turkish mafia boss Sedat Peker in June 2021, she demanded an investigation into the depopulation policy against the Kurds in the 1990s.

=== Foreign politics ===
Ebru Güney and fellow HDP MP Garo Paylan toured several countries in South America in August 2019 and also met the president of the Mercosur Parliament. In September 2020, she took part in the negotiations with representatives of the European Union regarding the human rights situation in Turkey.
