= Arat Dink =

Turkish Armenian journalist

- Born: 1979 (age 46–47); Istanbul, Turkey
- Occupation: Journalist
- Relatives: Hrant Dink(father)
- Writing career
- Notable awards: The Guardian Journalism Award by Index on Censorship(2008)

Arat Dink (Armenian: Առատ Տինք; born 1979) is a Turkish Armenian journalist and the executive editor of Agos, a bilingual Turkish Armenian weekly newspaper published in Istanbul. He is the son of Rakel Dink and Hrant Dink, the former editor-in-chief of the same paper, who was murdered by Ogün Samast, a Turkish ultra-nationalist who was seventeen years old at the time.

== Trial on Hrant Dink's assassination ==
Arat Dink was brought to trial as a co-defendant as the executive editor of Agos along with Serkis Seropyan, holder of the weekly's publishing license in the third and last case that was opened against Hrant Dink on charges of 'denigrating Turkishness' under Article 301 of the Turkish Penal Code. The charge was pressed in September 2006 after Agos republished a 14 July 2006 interview of Hrant Dink by the Reuters news agency where Hrant Dink referred to the 1915 massacre of Armenians in the Ottoman Empire as genocide.

The charges against Hrant Dink were dropped in the first hearing of the case, originally scheduled for 22 March 2007 and rescheduled to 14 June 2007 due to his death and continued for Serkis Seropyan and Arat Dink, with the second hearing scheduled for 18 July 2007. At the court hearing, Arat Dink accused judges of contributing to his father's death by making him a target thanks to their high-profile judicial proceedings. "I think it is primitive, absurd and dangerous to consider as an insult to Turkish identity the recognition of a historic event as a genocide," he said, quoted by the Anatolia news agency.

== Trial of Arat Dink for insulting Turkey's identity ==
On 11 October 2007 Arat Dink was convicted of insulting Turkey's identity for republishing his father's remarks. He was given a one-year suspended sentence for "insulting Turkishness", like his father before him.

== Awards ==
He was awarded the Guardian Journalism Award by Index on Censorship on 21 April 2008.
