= Kösreli, Silopi =

Village in Şırnak Province, Turkey

Kösreli
- Village
- Location within Turkey
- Coordinates: 37.342°N 42.424°E
- Country: Turkey
- Province: Şırnak
- District: Silopi
- Population (2023): 43
- Time zone: UTC+3 (TRT)

Kösreli (Note: Also spelt as Kösrali.) (Syriac: Ḥaṣṣen) (Note: Alternatively transliterated as Hassan, Hassana, Hassane, Ḥassāné, Hesana, Hessana, Hessanna, or Hossana.) is a village in the Silopi District of Şırnak Province in Turkey. The village is populated by Assyrians and had a population of 43 in 2023. It is located atop Mount Judi in the Bohtan region.

Near the village, there are two Assyrian reliefs, a ruined castle, and the Monastery of Glale (or "John the Persian").

== History ==
Ḥaṣṣen (today called Kösreli) is attested as the residence of the Church of the East metropolitan Joseph of Gazarta in 1808 after he had been forced to abandon his normal residence at the Monastery of Mar Isaac of Nineveh due to war. In the same year, he copied a manuscript at the Church of Mār Mūshe at Ḥaṣṣen for a Christian woman called Alpō. Joseph's successor, also named Joseph, similarly resided at Ḥaṣṣen in the second half of the nineteenth century and was converted to Protestantism with some of the villagers by American missionaries. The village was populated by 25 Protestant families and 4 or 5 Church of the East families in 1881.

In 1914, it was inhabited by 300 Assyrians, as per the list presented to the Paris Peace Conference by the Assyro-Chaldean delegation. It was located in the kaza (district) of Djeziret-ibn-Oumar. The villagers were tenants of the aghas of Şırnak and Silopi. Amidst the Sayfo, most of the villagers were massacred, including the Presbyterian pastor and the Church of the East priest, whilst some survivors found refuge at the nearby Kurdish village of Gerçulaye. In 1918, the village was inhabited by 420 Assyrians. Ḥaṣṣen had two churches dedicated to Mart Shmūni and Mār Mīkhāʾīl respectively in the 1950s that may have been built prior to the First World War. The village was known for the production of textiles made from goat hair.

By 1980, the village was inhabited by 200 families, including Protestants and adherents of the Assyrian Church of the East, the Chaldean Catholic Church, the Syriac Catholic Church, and the Syriac Orthodox Church. Ḥaṣṣen was forcibly evacuated by the Turkish army on 20 November 1993, but 40 families remained, and some families temporarily moved to Midun, Azakh, Bnebil, and the Mor Hananyo Monastery. Many villagers emigrated to Germany and Belgium, particularly the city of Mechelen. The Turkish Ministry of National Defence authorised families to return to Ḥaṣṣen in 2010.

== Population ==
Population history from 2015 to 2023:

Population
Year	Pop.	±%
2015	26	—
2020	48	+84.6%
2023	43	−10.4%

== Notable people ==
- Erol Dora (b. 1964), Syriac politician

== Bibliography ==
- Andrews, Peter Alford; Benninghaus, Rüdiger (1989). Ethnic Groups in the Republic of Turkey. Reichert.
- Atto, Naures (2011). Hostages in the Homeland, Orphans in the Diaspora: Identity Discourses Among the Assyrian/Syriac Elites in the European Diaspora (PDF). Leiden University Press.
- Courtois, Sébastien de (2013). "Tur Abdin : Réflexions sur l'état présent descommunautés syriaques du Sud-Est de la Turquie,mémoire, exils, retours". Cahier du Gremmamo (in French). 21: 113–150.
- Fiey, Jean Maurice (1975). Assyrie Chrétienne (in French). Vol. 2. Imprimerie Catholique de Beyrouth.
- Gaunt, David (2006). Massacres, Resistance, Protectors: Muslim-Christian Relations in Eastern Anatolia during World War I. Gorgias Press.
- Hollerweger, Hans; Palmer, Andrew (1999). Turabdin: Living Cultural Heritage (in English, German, and Turkish) (2nd ed.). Friends of Tur Abdin.
- Jongerden, Joost; Verheij, Jelle, eds. (2012). Social Relations in Ottoman Diyarbekir, 1870-1915. Brill.
- Sinclair, T.A. (1989). Eastern Turkey: An Architectural & Archaeological Survey. Vol. III. Pindar Press.
- Wilmshurst, David (2000). The Ecclesiastical Organisation of the Church of the East, 1318–1913 (PDF). Peeters Publishers.
- Yacoub, Joseph (2016). Year of the Sword: The Assyrian Christian Genocide, A History. Translated by James Ferguson. Oxford University Press.
