= Emir Ekşioğlu =

Turkish journalist (born 1994)

- Born: Istanbul, Turkey
- Occupations: Journalist, lobbyist, businessman

Emir Ekşioğlu (born 1994) is a Turkish journalist and entrepreneur.

== Biography ==
Emir Ekşioğlu was born in Istanbul whose family is from Rize. He published articles in important news sites such as HuffPost, Independent, Times of India, Economic Times, Times of Israel, Jerusalem Post, U.S. News, GQ, and Tehran Times and he has been a guest of media outlets such as Sputnik (news agency), FOX, Arte, Westdeutscher Rundfunk, Radio France, Voice of America.

He hosted an award-winning radio show on TRT. He was introduced as the youngest media boss thanks to some of his investments in Turkey. In 2016, he acquired the magazine group he had previously worked for from Nikkei. He also worked as a columnist for Karar (newspaper) for a period.

Eksioglu, also works as an Advisor for Switzerland-based Horasis think-tank.

=== Interview with the Taliban ===
On 15 August 2021, during the invasion of Kabul, he spoke to Mullah Yaqoob, one of the important commanders of the Taliban, for The Independent, and this news was published by many media outlets.

=== Lobbying allegations ===
In 2023 his lobbying and agent of influence on behalf of the Turkish government has come to the fore and he has remained silent on allegations. Following these allegations, many of his articles in international news websites were removed from publication.
