= Dump of Untitled Pieces =

- Turkish: İsimsiz Eserler Mezarlığı
- Directed by: Melik Kuru
- Written by: Melik Kuru
- Produced by: Hilal Şenel; Fahriye Ismayilova
- Starring: Manolya Maya; Ekremcan Aslandağ; Tülin Özen; Tuğrul Tülek
- Cinematography: Barış Aygen
- Edited by: Serhad Mutlu
- Music by: Efe Demiral
- Production companies: Hafif Film; Parda Film; Zest Film
- Release date: 14 November 2025 (Tallinn Black Nights Film Festival)
- Running time: 105 minutes
- Country: Turkey
- Language: Turkish

Dump of Untitled Pieces (Turkish: İsimsiz Eserler Mezarlığı) is a 2025 black-and-white comedy drama film written and directed by Melik Kuru, depicting the adventures of two young adults as they try to navigate Istanbul's art world. The movie had its world premiere at 29th Tallinn Black Nights Film Festival in November 2025. It was also selected for the 2026 editions of Slamdance Film Festival, Sofia International Film Festival and International Istanbul Film Festival, Antalya Film Festival.

== Synopsis ==
Facing imminent eviction, Aslı, an idealistic young photographer and her hapless roommate, Murat, attempt to sell her work to galleries for the first time, embarking on a bumpy journey through the collapsing art market of Istanbul.

== Cast ==
- Manolya Maya as Aslı
- Ekremcan Aslandağ as Murat
- Tülin Özen as Sema
- Tuğrul Tülek as Mete
- Ceylan Özgün Özçelik as Nurdan
- Okan Avcı as Kerem
- Emrah Özdemir as Arda

== Production ==
Filming started a week before the 2023 Turkish presidential and parliamentary elections, and some exterior scenes were shot before the election blackout started. Then the production continued a year later and took three weeks to complete, this time, a week after the 2024 Turkish local elections. The movie has been financed independently.

== Accolades ==
At the International Istanbul Film Festival, Dump of Untitled Pieces won Best Original Music (Efe Demiral) and Best Art Direction (Elif Öner) in the New Visions competition, as well as the Best Film Award from the jury of the Turkish Film Critics Association (SİYAD). At the 37th Ankara Film Festival, it won the Best Debut Film award.
