= Rakel Dink =

Turkish-Armenian activist (born 1959)

- Born: 1959 (age 65–66); Silopi, Şırnak, Turkey
- Spouse: Hrant Dink (m. 1976; died 2007)
- Children: 3, including Arat

Rakel Dink (born 1959) is a Turkish Armenian human rights activist, and head of the Hrant Dink Foundation.

She is the last member of the Armenian Varto Tribe who had settled in Cizre. She is the widow of Hrant Dink, a Turkish journalist and human rights activist of Armenian origin who was assassinated on 19 January 2007.

She grew up in the Armenian orphanage, Kamp Armen, in Tuzla and served as the camp's manager for many years. She later became known for her speech at her husband's funeral. Her famous quote – "Nothing can be done without questioning the darkness that creates a killer from a baby." – was well-received by the public and published in the media. Following Hrant Dink's assassination, she became involved in human rights activities and has served as the head of Hrant Dink Foundation since 2007.

== Life ==
She was born in 1959 in Yolağzı, Silopi. She is the second child of Varto tribe's chief Siyament Yağbasan (Vartanyan) and his wife Delal.

The Armenian Varto tribe received an order for exile in 1915, but when they were attacked during the voyage, they took refuge in Mount Judi with the help of an Arab Muslim tribe called Tayanlar and lived there for 25 years. After 25 years and following World War II, the tribe moved to Cizre and was assimilated by Turkey to the Kurdish population there and began to speak mostly in Kurdish, and to carry out Christian worship in Kurdish. After living a migrant life in bristle tents for a while, the tribe settled in the village of Varto, today called Yolağzı. Members of the tribe moved to Istanbul in 1978 and later to Belgium and France in the 1980s, and Dink's father Siyament died in Brussels in 2004. Rakel Dink is the last member of the tribe in Turkey.

Growing up in the village of Varto, Rakel Dink lost her mother in 1967, when she was 8 years old. Her father was taken to Istanbul with 12 children during his visit to the Armenian Protestant preacher Hrant Guzelyan (also known as Kucukguzelyan), a program for the placement of Anatolian Armenians in Istanbul. Rakel Dink was in the second group sent to Istanbul. In 1968, she went to Istanbul with her two brothers, and was placed in the Armenian Orphanage in Tuzla, called Kamp Armen. In summers, she stayed in Tuzla and in winters she was moved to Gedikpaşa Orphanage. Rakel Dink, who did not speak any languages other than Kurdish at the time, learned Turkish and Armenian in Istanbul. She graduated from Gedikpaşa İncirdibi Armenian Elementary School. Since she was officially registered as a Turkish citizen, it was not possible for her to attend the Armenian school anymore. When her father did not allow her to attend a Turkish school after fifth grade, she was left out of the formal education system. She received a special education at the Gedikpaşa Orphanage.

She later met Hrant Dink at the Tuzla Armenian Children's Camp and married him on 19 April 1976. The religious ceremony was conducted at a church on 23 April 1977. The couple had three children: Delal (1978), Arat (1979) and Sera (1986).

After the arrest of Güzelyan, the director of the Tuzla camp, in 1979 Rakel Dink, together with her husband, served as the director of the Tuzla Armenian Children's Camp.

Her husband, Hrant Dink, was assassinated on 19 January 2007 as he returned to the offices of Agos. A funeral was organized for Hrant Dink on 23 January 2007, which was attended by a large number of people. Rakel Dink also delivered a speech at the ceremony.

Rakel Dink is the president of the Hrant Dink Foundation, which was established in 2007 in order to develop a culture of dialogue, peace and empathy in order to keep Hrant Dink's dreams, language and heart alive for a more fair and free world.
