= Erol Dora =

Turkish politician

Member of the Turkish Grand National Assembly for Mardin
- Incumbent
- Assumed office 2012

Personal details
- Born: 2 February 1964 (age 62) Hassana near Silopi, Turkey
- Citizenship: Turkey
- Party: People's Democratic Party (HDP)
- Children: three
- Education: Ankara University
- Profession: Lawyer

Erol Dora (born 2 February 1964, in Hassana near Silopi) is a lawyer and a politician of the Peoples' Democratic Party (HDP). A member of the Assyrian people community in Turkey, he is a well-known advocate for minority rights, Assyrian particularly the human rights situation of Turkey's Christian minorities.

In the 2011 general election Dora became the first ethnic Assyrian member of the Turkish Parliament, and the first Christian MP since 1960. Since 2014 a member of the HDP, he was re-elected in the consecutive June and November 2015 elections.

== Early life and education ==
Dora was born 1964 to Enver and Kespu Dora, a Syriac Orthodox family in the small, all-Christian village of Hesena in the Şırnak Province. In the 1980s and 1990s, almost all of them however fled to Istanbul or Western Europe, after the Turkish military forcibly "evacuated" and effectively depopulated thousands of villages. Hassana, where Dora spent his early childhood, was one of these villages abandoned in the 1990s.

Aged nine, Dora moved to Istanbul, where he attended the Armenian boarding school and orphanage Kamp Armen. Following his studies of law at Ankara University, he was drafted to attend his military service in Malatya, but was released early after paying the Bedelli askerlik.

== Professional and political career ==
Following his studies, Dora returned to Istanbul practising as a lawyer, often defending Christians in trials. In 2004, he became a founding member and vice president of the first civic association of Assyrians/Syriacs since the 1980 military coup, the Mesopotamia Culture and Solidarity Association (Mezopotamya Kültür ve Dayanışma Derneği, or MEZODER).

In the 2011 general election, Dora became an independent candidate for the Labour, Democracy and Freedom Bloc. He was elected in the Mardin constituency to become the first Assyrian member of the Grand National Assembly ever, and the first Christian MP since 1960. Though affiliated with the pro-minority Peace and Democracy Party (BDP), he told the Vatican Insider that he joined Parliament "as a free man" and wouldn't answer to any party. In late 2013, Dora however became one of the forerunner MPs to support the formation of the new Peoples' Democratic Party (HDP), which he later joined.

He was reelected in the consecutive Parliamentary Elections of June and November 2015 as a Member of the Grand National Assembly of Turkey representing Mardin for the HDP. In November 2015, Dora and Mithat Sancar joined fellow MPs Gülser Yıldırım and Ali Atalan in their hunger strike to protest the ongoing state of exception curfew in the border town of Nusaybin, where since November 13 and under the pretext of operating against militant YDG-H members, 70% of the neighborhoods have been cut from electricity, 30% from water supply. On the 17 March 2021, the Turkish state prosecutor before the Court of Cassation Bekir Şahin filed a lawsuit before the Constitutional Court demanding for Dora and 686 other HDP politicians a five-year ban for political activities. The lawsuit was filed jointly with the request for a closure of the HDP.

== Positions ==
=== State expropriation of Christian minorities ===
In the long-standing dispute on the Turkish state's confiscation of Assyrian property, Dora, along with various Assyrian diaspora organizations, demands a reversal of the expropriations and a return to the status quo ante. In June 2014, Dora sponsored a parliamentary motion demanding a parliamentary inquiry into the issue, which is also controversial within the Kurdish communities.

Stating that there was still "no rule of law in the region, only the rule of force," he proposed a scholarly commission to settle the land-claims of Syriac and Yezidi minorities. Most of them had emigrated when during the late 1980s "low-density war" thousands of Kurdish and Assyrian villages were forcibly "evacuated" and effectively depopulated, leaving the villagers as refugees in their own land.

=== Current situation of Christian minorities ===
During the PKK's unilateral cease-fire, Dora appreciated what in 2003 he called an "atmosphere of peace" that had played a significant role in encouraging Assyrians to consider a return to their Southern Anatolian homeland. In 2011, Dora still said: "Europe has the impression that Turkey is moving towards Islam and that it is a country that is becoming less secular. But as far as I am concerned, there isn't much of a difference between the past and the present, the situation is more or less the same and one of the things that has changed for the better is in fact the situation for Christians."

In the issue of history school books denigrating Armenians and Aramaic Christians, Dora however acknowledged that hostile phrasings appeared there only relatively recently. The textbooks were found to distort historical information portraiting the Christian minorities as traitors, supposedly to help justify the genocides against Christians in the outgoing Ottoman Empire. To discuss the issue originally raised by fourteen Syriac civil and religious organizations, Dora met education minister Ömer Dinçer on 15 December 2011 and raised the issue in parliament. Eventually the ministry promised the revision of a particularly problematic textbook, which however turned into the opposite, as the revised version of the textbook doesn't only portray Assyrians as traitors in the past, but now also claims that even today's Assyrians continued their betrayal of Turkey.

Lately, Dora supported the – ultimately successful – months of protest against destruction of the historic Armenian community property Kamp Armen in Istanbul, where he himself was once raised and educated. Visiting the site in May 2015, he stated that "Kamp Armen will be a significant symbol that provides an answer to that question."

Regarding the mass exodus of Christians from Iraq, Dora asked the United Nations and the USA to "intervene to defend them but without creating a civil conflict."
