= Agos =

Armenian newspaper published in Turkey

Agos Ակօս
- Cover of Agos on 18 January 2013 carrying the photo of its assassinated editor in chief Hrant Dink
- Type: Weekly newspaper
- Format: Berliner
- Founder: Hrant Dink
- Editor-in-chief: Hrant Dink (1996–2007); Etyen Mahçupyan (2007–2010); Rober Koptaş (2010–2015); Yetvart Danzikyan (2015–present)
- Founded: 1996
- Political alignment: Neutral
- Language: Turkish and Armenian (print and online edition); English (online edition)
- Headquarters: Istanbul, Turkey
- Website: www.agos.com.tr

Agos (in Armenian: Ակօս, "furrow") is a bilingual weekly newspaper published in Istanbul, Turkey, established on 25 February 1996 by Hrant Dink, Luiz Bakar, Harutyun Şeşetyan, and Anna Turay.

Agos has both Armenian and Turkish pages as well as an online English edition and sells about 3.000 physical copies every week. The newspaper is financially fully independent and aims to tackle problems regarding the Armenian community within Turkey, but also Turkey's internal matters regarding politics, society, culture, minority rights, human rights, and more.

== History ==
=== Historical background, pre-1996 ===
Before Agos introduced themselves in public life in Turkey, the 50.000-80.000 Armenians living within the Turkish borders were severely underrepresented; The only media outlets presenting this group were fully written in Armenian, even though only an estimated amount of 20% could understand the language. The community was in a precarious position as the minority group got hit by the Wealth Tax of 1942, the September riots of 1955, and the unrest for innocent Armenians after terror actions by ASALA. This was in addition to the events of 1915, generally referred to as the Armenian genocide.

In the nineties, Turkey shifted its internal politics, paving the way for social movements demanding cultural representation for minorities with a growing demand for fair representation. Hrant Dink, an Armenian writer and intellectual living in Turkey, established a commission with the goal of solving three problems for the Armenian community.

- The first aiming to improve the status of the Armenian community through the lens of Turkish politicians and within media coverage;
- The second focusing on creating equality by preserving Armenian heritage, improving education, and linguistically supporting Armenians;
- And finally, thirdly, allowing Armenians to work through the generational and cultural trauma built up due to a suppressive culture.

Hrant Dink and Mesrob Mutafyan developed a project to find a daily newspaper to reflect the Armenian minority within Turkey. This evolved into what we now know as Agos. The founders Luiz Bakar, Hrant Dink, Harutyun Şeşetyan, Anna Turay launched the first publication on 25 february 1996 with the first printed edition on the 8th of April.

=== Founding years, 1996 to 2007 ===
The establishments of Agos allowed for a cultural impact by engaging in politics, politicing the Armenian diaspora and creating bridges between ethnic Turks and Armenians. In a series of articles on the tenth anniversary in 2006, Hrant Dink reflects:

"We have not only introduced the Armenian community's problems to the Turkish society, but we also presented the Turkish society's problems to the Armenian community. ... Agos became a reference point for international press, international political circles, and intellectuals."

In the founding years, one of Agos main concerns was the ever decreasing population of the Armenian community and the weakening of civil institutions in Turkey. Furthermore Agos paid significant attention to the effect of globalization and gave space to ideas about cultural identity and nation-state building. Many authors, including Hrant Dink, criticised the Armenians in Turkey for being a closed community; They suggested that the community should embrace the idea of living together with the rest of the population.

Agos, as a newspaper, created several controversies regarding the existence and meaning of an Armenian identity. In 2003, the newspaper changed its policy regarding the understanding of Armenian identity. At this time, Dink wrote on this issue in a serial called 'On the Armenian identity'. In this serial, Dink discussed:

- The importance of the fourth generation of the Armenian diaspora;
- The relevance of publicly discussing the Genocide;
- The relationship between the Church and Armenian identity;
- The concept of "double identity";
- Diaspora and dissolution of nation based identity;

Dink proposed solutions according to his own vision. After publishing this serial the public labelled him as enemy of the Turks. A trial followed and Dink was convicted for insulting Turkey, the Turkish nation, and Turkish government institutions based on article 301 of the Turkish Penal Code.

=== After assassination, 2007 to present ===
Following Dink's assassination on the 19th of January in 2007, close to 100.000 people filled the streets of Istanbul speaking out as minorities to the system. Costing him his own life and becoming a martyr, Dink's death kick-started a transformative moment, allowing Armenians to speak out more boldly on the affairs of 1915. Ethnic-Turks being sympathetic to Agos' cause and showing solidarity allowed Agos to spread their message; Aris Nalci, an Agos journalist, said in 2010:

"I lost my fear in 2007. If I speak I can be killed, if I don't speak, I can be killed, so why would I not speak?"

After the assassination, in 2007, Etyen Mahçupyan was named editor-in-chief. Hrant Dink's son, Arat Dink, who served as the executive editor of the weekly and fellow editor Sarkis Saropyan, would be condemned to one year in prison after speaking out against the Turkish Republic.

In 2010, Mahçupyan was succeeded by Rober Koptaş as editor-in-chief. Arat Dink re-continued to serve as executive editor after his one-year absence. Furthermore, in 2010, it was notable that the Armenian part of the newspaper was significantly smaller than the Turkish part. This showcases the Armenian struggle for their language to stay alive within the Turkish Republic. Agos's role in this however, is one of the few positive effects as they are embedded within civil society processes; Facilitating new dialogue and functioning as a bridge between cultures.

In 2012, a plan made by the Atsız Youth to attack the Agos headquarters was exposed. Furthermore, this year was significant for Agos due to a few of their long-desired plans being realised; An Armenian radio channel with the name of 'Nor Radyo' was founded, and more importantly, the newspaper would finally have an online version.

In 2015, Yetvart Danzikyan became editor-in-chief of the newspaper and Aris Nalcı executive editor.

In 2025, Yetvart Danzikyan is still the editor-in-chief. Miran Manukyan has taken on the role of executive editor.

== Governance ==
=== Editors-In-Chief ===
Name	Time period
Hrant Dink	1996 to 2007
Etyen Mahçupyan	2007 to 2010
Rober Koptaş	2010 to 2015
Yetvart Danzikyan	2015 to present

== Finances & Reach ==
=== Financially Independent ===
The newspaper, which is also a non-profit organisation, stands on its own feet with the revenues of memberships, sales, and advertisements. The mindset behind this being that funding from any foundation or institution should be refused because it would restrict the freedom of expression and independency. In an interview with Pakrat Estukyan, one of Agos' most vocal speakers since Hrant Dink's death, he would proudly say:

"Agos does not belong to a particular capitalist enterprise defending mostly its owners’ interests, as is the case for most of the newspapers in Turkey. Agos belongs to the workers of the newspaper. It does not represent the interests of the capital; it only represents the interests and the stance of its workers."

In 2018, editor-in-chief Yetvart Danzikyan underlined that the economic sustainability of the newspaper is not painless since the culture of access to newspapers for free is common in Turkey.

=== Foundation Process ===
To ensure their autonomy, the founders of Agos declined the idea of sponsorships and instead would internally find the necessary money. 18.000-20.000 dollars were collected by the founders and employees. An extra 20.000 dollars would come from a loan at a non-disclosed bank. Adding to that Sarkis Seropyan, Agos' first ever employee, says about the foundation process:

"The ones who founded the newspaper or started working from the first day on, financially contributed to its foundation process. We did not get any money or financial support from any other resources ... It was Hrant Dink who contributed the most, as he was already a small-scale businessman. ... During its foundation process, everybody got a share from the newspaper in proportion to what he/she financially had contributed."

=== Reached Numbers ===
In 1996, the first year of the newspaper, they would print and sell 1.800 copies per week.

In 2001, after a steady increase, the physical version of the newspaper sold 3.000 copies per week.

In a sample from June 2003, Agos would print and sell 5.324 copies per week.

In 2006, Agos would print and sell 6.000 copies per week; 3.000 would be sold to Armenians within Türkiye, 2.000 would go to foreign countries, and 1.000 to non-Armenians within Turkey.

In 2007, in the weeks after the assassination of Hrant Dink, the sales would reach 50.000 copies per week.

In 2015, the physical version of the newspaper sells 4.000-5.000 copies per week plus an extra 500 subscribers abroad.

In 2023, the physical version of the newspaper sold 3.000 copies per week, this is purely from subscribers within Turkey.

== Discourse of the Newspaper ==
=== Main Subjects ===
Agos has a dissenting and independent position both within the Armenian community and its relations with the State. The newspaper focuses on the topics regarding human rights infringements and democratic progress in Turkey; Accusations against the Community; the Turkish-Armenian dialogue; the Armenian cultural legacy; And defects within the Armenian community, such as non-transparency within the Turkish administration.

Furthermore, approximately 80 percent of the diaspora could not understand Armenian texts; The newspaper aimed to increase the language skills of the community as well. Introducing new perspectives in the public dialogue and showing the cultural identity was initially due to the precarious positions of Armenians in Turkey. At the time, many of those negative connotations came to life by claims regarding the ASALA organisation. In a commission led by Hrant Dink and other Armenian intellectuals, Agos would set out to focus on:

- Improving the status of the Armenians in public life by changing the treatment from politicians and by changing the mainstream media coverage (or at the very least providing an alternative in Agos).
- Creating more equality between citizens of the Turkish Republic by preserving Armenian architectural heritage, historical heritage, improving quality of textbooks within education, and protecting the Armenian language;
- Normalising public discussion about generational and cultural trauma builds up after a suppressive history.

=== Cultural Significance ===
As a minority newspaper, Agos politicised the Armenian community and reinforced their appearance in Turkish public discourse.

Before Agos, the emphasis on the collective trauma of the 1915 events (the Armenian Genocide) was hidden within Turkey. Agos and specifically Hrant Dink reconciled and confronted the public domain with the minorities' struggle and traumas in a proactive manner, instead of waiting for Turkish governmental approval. Agos operated highly sensitively by using the term "genocide"

Furthermore, Agos called for the limitation of power for the Armenian Patriarchate and its representation of the community in general.

The Lausanne Treaty and, therefore, the Turkification of all citizens within the Turkish borders led to the hiding of the Armenian community as a minority. The religious terms, the separation of the public and private sphere of the community, were substantially ignored. Agos would present these issues to the Turkish public and create a public debate within the Armenian community.

After Hrant Dink's assassination, Agos's status became widely known and re-embraced Armenian groups spread across the world.

Out of the 24 pages published on a weekly basis, twenty of those are in Turkish, whereas only four of them appear in the Armenian language. The importance here is that it allows Turks to be reached as well, as well as playing into the big parts of the Armenian diaspora, who cannot understand the Armenian language.

== Contemporary Discussion ==
After reaching a certain number of readers, Agos changed its supportive methodology regarding the Church and claimed that the Armenian community should follow a more secular approach. This change is considered one of the radical shifts in the newspaper's publishing policy.

In 2025, Agos comprehensively covered the Turkish protests that took place after the detention and arrest of Ekrem Imamoğlu and many opposition members. The online editor, Nazan Özcan, underlined about this:

"(...) there is no one left to speak out for them—no one except for those, like at Agos, whose understanding of the past tells them that no group in a polity is guaranteed civil rights when another’s rights are under attack."
