= Hrant Dink Foundation =

Organization succeeding the works of Hrant Dink

Hrant Dink Foundation is an organization established following the 2007 assassination of Hrant Dink, a prominent Turkish-Armenian journalist, in order to "carry on Hrant’s dreams, Hrant’s struggle, Hrant’s language and Hrant’s heart". Among the organization's specific goals are to monitor hate speech in Turkey, to study history from a non-nationalist perspective especially using oral history, build relationships between Turkey, Armenia and Europe, and improve democratization and human rights in Turkey.

The organization operates a "Turkey-Armenia Fellowship Scheme" enabling Turkish and Armenian professionals to visit the other country with the aim of improving relations, and also participates in the European Union-funded reconciliation initiative, "Support to the Armenia-Turkey Normalisation Process Programme". In 2010, the organization helped organize an exhibition on "Armenian Architects of Istanbul". In 2012, the Platform "I Demand Hate Crime Legislation" was established, supported by the Hrant Dink Foundation as well as dozens of other civil society organizations in Turkey. In 2017, Hrant Dink's widow, Rakel Dink, accepted the Chirac Foundation's Chirac Prize for Conflict Prevention, which was handed to her by French president Emmanuel Macron. On 23 April 2019, the organization unveiled Hrant Dink’s Site of Memory at their headquarters in Istanbul. In 2020, a suspect was arrested for sending death threats to the organization and Rakel Dink.

The foundation has organized several academic conferences, including the 2015 conference "A Civilization Destroyed: The Wealth of Non-Muslims in the Late Ottoman Period and the Early Republican Era", in cooperation with Boğaziçi University, Istanbul Bilgi University, and Sabancı University. The organization has also promoted research into actions of rescue during the genocide through its History and Memory Research Fund. Another focus for the organization is oral history research, which has involved the publication of a series of books "Sounds of Silence" detailing oral histories of Armenians from various parts of Turkey. The organization also sponsored a historical study into the seizure of Armenian foundations during the republican era. In October 2019, a Turkish court banned the organization's conference titled "Social, Cultural and Economic History of Kayseri and the Region". No reason was given. The present director of the Foundation is Rakel Dink.
