= Yetvart Tomasyan =

Turkish-Armenian publisher (born 1949)

Yetvart Tomasyan (born 1949 in Istanbul) is a Turkish-Armenian publisher who founded Aras Publishing in 1993.

== Sources ==
- Galip, Özlem Belçim (2020). New Social Movements and the Armenian Question in Turkey: Civil Society vs. the State. Springer International Publishing. ISBN 978-3-030-59400-8.
