= Arras Film Festival =

Film festival

- Location: Arras, France
- Founded: 2000
- Awards: Atlas d'or
- Directors: Nadia Paschetto
- Website: www.arrasfilmfestival.com

The Arras Film Festival is a film festival devoted to French and European cinema, held in early November in Arras, Pas-de-Calais department.

== Description ==
The Arras Film Festival was founded in 2000 by Plan-Séquence. The event is dedicated to the promotion of French and European cinema with a focus on young and emerging filmmakers. Every year 125 films are selected for the festival. Apart from the main competition, awards are given in Visions of the East and Discoveries sections along with assistance grants. The festival also hosts additional events — ArrasDays, a co-production and funding platform, and Rencontres du Nord for distributors and exhibitors.

== Editions ==
The 20th anniversary edition of the festival took place from 8 to 17 November 2019, with Nicole Garcia as the guest of honour. Film-opening — Valérie Donzelli's Our Dame, the closing film — Julie Manoukian's Vetos.

In 2022, the festival had 45,000 visitors, exceeding the 43,000 population of Arras. The 23d edition took place from 4 to 13 November, offering its visitors 120 feature films and 80 premieres.

The 24th edition of the festival went from 3 to 12 November 2023. That edition showcased 110 films and had Agnieszka Holland and Matteo Garrone as guests of honour who delivered masterclasses. The 24th edition of the fest attracted an audience of 50,000. In 2025, the festival boasted a program of 122 feature films.
