= Karar (newspaper) =

Daily newspaper in Turkey

Karar (English: Decision) is a daily newspaper published in Turkey since 7 March 2016.

The newspaper, of which editor-in-chief is İbrahim Kiras, was first published as an e-newspaper on 28 April 2015, by a group of journalists who left Akşam and Star newspapers. Its editorial line is conservative and liberal.
