= Harutyunyan =

Harutyunyan (Armenian: Հարությունյան, Western Armenian: Յարութիւնեան), also transliterated as Harutyunian, Haroutunian, Harutiunyan, or Arutyunyan is an Armenian patronymic surname derived from the given name Harutyun. The Russified version is Arutyunov. Notable people with the surname include:

== Arutiunian ==
- Alexander Arutiunian (1920–2012), Armenian Soviet classical composer and pianist

== Arutyunian ==
- Vladimir Arutyunian (born 1978), Georgian attempted assassin of George W. Bush

== Arutyunyan ==
- Georgy Arutyunyan (born 2004), Russian-born Armenian football player
- Gevorg Arutyunyan (born 1997), Russian-Armenian former footballer
- Rafael Arutyunyan (born 1957), American figure skating coach of Armenian descent

== Haroutunian ==
- Arto Der Haroutunian (1940–1987), British Armenian cook, artist, translator and writer
- Joseph Haroutunian (1904–1968), American Presbyterian theologian
- Sophie Haroutunian-Gordon, American Armenian education writers

== Harutiunian ==
- Ardashes Harutiunian (1873–1915), Ottoman Armenian poet, translator and literary critic. Used pen-names Manishak, Ban, Shahen-Garo and Garo
- Hovhannes Harutiunian (1860–1915), Ottoman Armenian writer and teacher known by his pen name Tlgadintsi

== Harutiunyan ==
- Vagharshak Harutiunyan (born 1956), Armenian politician and Defence Minister of Armenia from June 1999 until May 2000

== Harutyunyan ==
- Ara Harutyunyan (1928–1999), Armenian monumental sculptor and graphic artist
- Ararat Harutyunyan (born 1975), Armenian footballer
- Arayik Harutyunyan (born 1973), Prime Minister of Nagorno-Karabakh and President of Artsakh
- Armen Harutyunyan (born 1964), Armenian lawyer and Judge at the European Court of Human Rights (ECHR)
- Armen A. Harutyunyan, Armenian economist
- Arsen Harutyunyan, multiple people
- Artak Harutyunyan (born 1983), Armenian greco-roman wrestler
- Artem Harutyunyan (born 1945), Armenian writer, translator and critic
- Artem Harutyunyan (born 1990), Armenian-born German professional boxer
- Artsvik Harutyunyan (born 1984), Armenian singer and songwriter
- Artur Harutyunyan (born 1979), Armenian politician
- Davit Harutyunyan (born 1963), Armenian politician
- Gagik Harutyunyan (born 1948), Armenian politician and Prime Minister of Armenia
- Gegham Harutyunyan (born 1990), Armenian footballer
- Gevorg Harutyunyan, Armenian artist, singer-songwriter and dancer
- Gohar Harutyunyan (model) (born 1979), Armenian model, Miss Armenia
- Gohar Harutyunyan (born 2002), Armenian sports shooter
- Hasmik Harutyunyan (born 1960), Armenian folk singer
- Hayk Harutyunyan (born 1974), Armenian retired football midfielder
- Hovhannes Harutyunyan (born 1999), Armenian footballer
- Hrachya Harutyunyan (born 1961), Armenian actor and artistic director
- Jalal Harutyunyan (born 1974), Armenian general
- Khosrov Harutyunyan (born 1948), Armenian politician and Prime Minister of Armenia
- Kristine Harutyunyan (born 1991), Armenian javelin thrower
- Lernik Harutyunyan (born 1981), Armenian actor
- Levon Harutyunyan (1927–2007), Armenian biologist, professor, writer and journalist
- Levon Harutyunyan (born 1967), Armenian actor
- Lilit Harutyunyan (born 1993), Armenian track and field athlete
- Mihran Harutyunyan (born 1989), Armenian-Russian Greco-Roman wrestler and mixed martial artist
- Mikael Harutyunyan (born 1946), Armenian general and politician
- Samson Harutyunyan (1861–1941), Armenian politician
- Shant Harutyunyan (born 1965), Armenian political and public activist
- Siranush Harutyunyan (born 1987), Armenian singer and songwriter, known professionally as Sirusho
- Susanna Harutyunyan (born 1963), Armenian writer and novelist
- Tigran Harutyunyan (born 1997), Armenian chess player
- Varazdat Harutyunyan (1909–2008), Armenian academic, architect and writer
- Vladimir Harutyunyan (born 1998), Armenian diver
- Zhora Harutyunyan (1928–2002), Armenian writer and playwright
