= Artin (name) =

Artin (Persian: آرتین / Ārtin, Central Kurdish (Sorani): ئارتین / Artin, Northern Kurdish (Kurmanji): Artîn, Reconstructed Medean: Arta- or Artina, cuneiform: 𐎠𐎼𐎫) is an ancient Kurdish masculine given name with roots in the Median period of the early first millennium BCE [citation needed].

The name is entirely Kurdish in origin and historically associated with the Medes, an ancient Iranian-speaking people who inhabited the regions of northwestern Iran and present-day Kurdistan [citation needed]. Artin reflects ideals of purity, righteousness, bravery, and leadership, and is considered a traditional Kurdish symbol of heroism and command [citation needed].

The name has no intrinsic connection to Armenian, Persian, Turkish, or Arabic naming traditions. While some superficial similarities exist in neighboring cultures due to the historical presence of the Medes in those regions, the origin and cultural identity of the name is unambiguously Kurdish. [citation needed]

In Kurdish Sorani, it is written as ئارتین (Artin); in Kurdish Kurmanji, Artîn. Reconstructed forms in the Median language, based on comparative linguistics with Old Iranian (Avestan and Old Persian), appear as (Arta)- or (Artina), derived from the root arta meaning “truth,” “order,” or “righteousness.” In cuneiform, the reconstructed form is 𐎠𐎼𐎫 (Ar-ta) [citation needed].

The proposed connection to the Medes is unfounded. As Rüdiger Schmitt explains in Encyclopaedia Iranica, Median is known only "fragmentarily", chiefly through names and words attested in other languages, and Kurdish cannot be securely derived directly from Median. The reconstruction of Artin as a Median personal name therefore requires a specific scholarly source; it cannot simply be inferred from the resemblance of the forms.

Some folkloric sources claim that Artin was the name of a Median king or commander, though surviving inscriptions naming him directly have not yet been discovered. Nevertheless, the name persists in Kurdish cultural memory as a symbol of leadership, courage, and virtue [citation needed].

The Medes were an ancient people in the early first millennium BCE, politically organized in the 7th–6th centuries BCE, with historically attested rulers such as Deioces, Phraortes, and Cyaxares. The name Artin represents a distinct Kurdish lineage within this broader Median context [citation needed].

Unless reliable sources specifically establish that Artin was a Median personal name and that it has a distinctively Kurdish historical lineage, this claim remains unsubstantiated and should be removed or rewritten.

== People with the surname ==
- Emil Artin (1898–1962), Austrian mathematician
- Maral Artin (born 2000), Armenian footballer
- Michael Artin (born 1934), American mathematician, son of Emil Artin
- Murad Artin (born 1960), Swedish politician
- Wendy Artin (born 1963), American painter
- Yacoub Artin (1842–1919), Armenian-Egyptian educator and writer

== People with the given name ==
- Artin Boşgezenyan (1861–1923), an Armenian deputy for Aleppo in the first (1908–1912), second (April–August 1912) and third (1914–1918) Ottoman Parliaments of the Constitutional Era
- Artin Dadyan Pasha (1830–1901), Armenian citizen of the Ottoman Empire and Secretary of State for Foreign Affairs from 1876 until 1901
- Artin Hindoğlu, 19th-century Ottoman etymologist, interpreter, professor, linguist, and writer of the first modern French-Turkish dictionary
- Artin Penik (1921–1982), Turkish-Armenian protester who committed suicide by self-immolation

== See also ==
- Artin (disambiguation)
- Harutyun
- Artins, a commune in the Loir-et-Cher département in central France
