= Buckingham Browne & Nichols School =

Private school in Cambridge, Massachusetts, US

Coordinates: 42.3791°N 71.1296°W

Location
- 80 Gerry's Landing Road; Cambridge, Massachusetts 02138; United States

Information
- Type: Private, Independent
- Motto: Honestas, Litterae, Comitas (Honor, Scholarship, and Kindness)
- Religious affiliation: None
- Established: 1883 – Browne & Nichols; 1889 – Buckingham School
- CEEB code: 220475
- Dean: Rory Morton
- Head of school: Jennifer Price
- Grades: Pre-K–12
- Enrollment: 1,003
- Student to teacher ratio: 6:1
- Campuses: 3
- Colors: Blue & Gold
- Song: Jerusalem
- Athletics conference: Independent School League
- Mascot: Knight
- Nickname: BB&N
- Accreditation: NEASC
- Newspaper: The Vanguard, The Mouthguard, The Point of View, CHASM, The Benchwarmer
- Yearbook: The Perspective
- Budget: $43,998,280
- Annual tuition: $60,650 (grades 7-12)
- Website: bbns.org

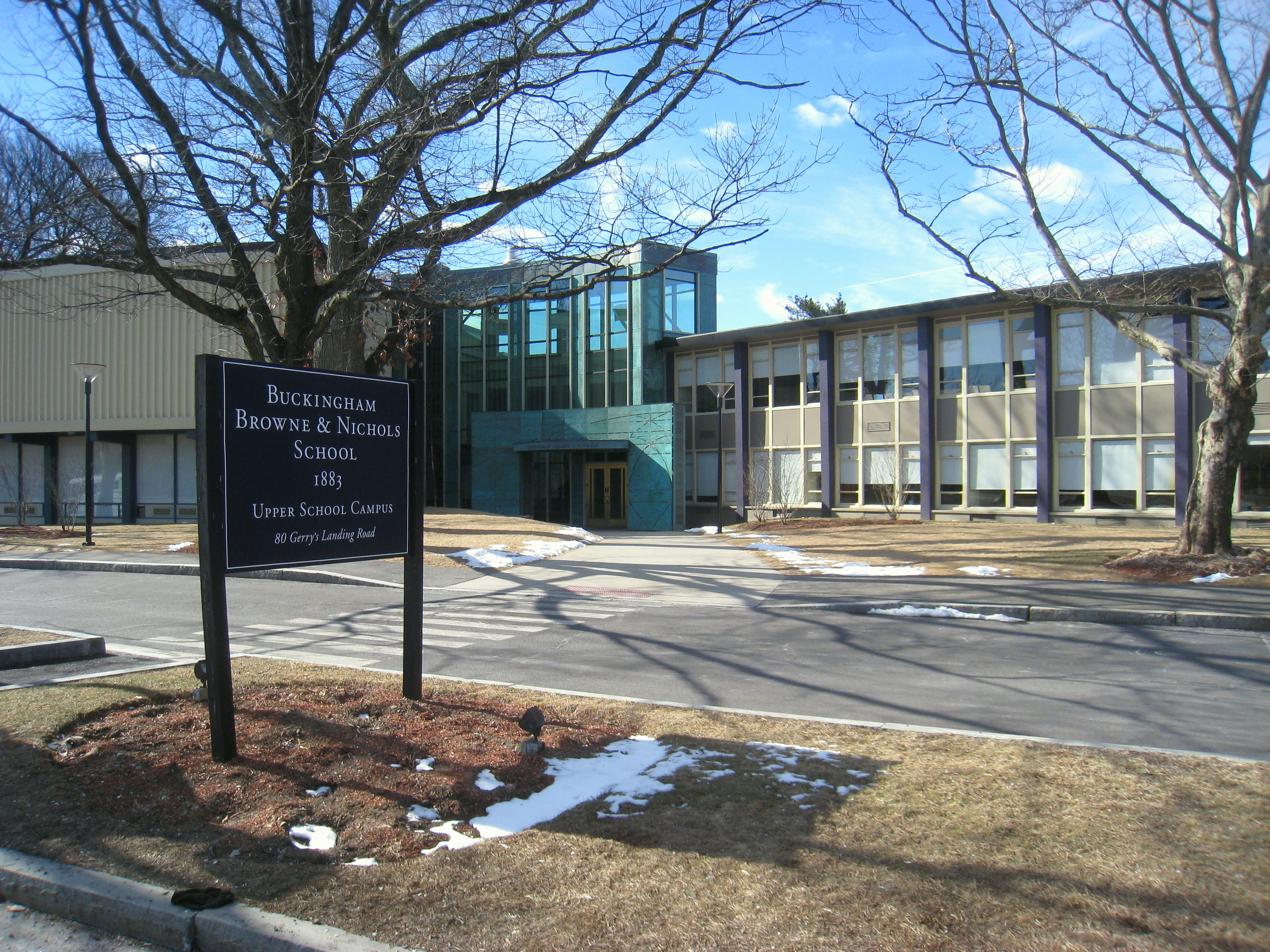
Upper School

Buckingham Browne & Nichols School, often referred to as BB&N, is an independent co-educational day school in Cambridge, Massachusetts, educating students from pre-kindergarten (called Beginners) through twelfth grade. Graduates of the school include three of the 27 Presidential Scholars from Massachusetts since the inception of the program in 1964; the school is a member of the G30 Schools group and the Round Square global education association.

== Origins ==
1883, George Henry Browne's School

During the year 1882–1883, before Browne & Nichols came into formal existence, founder George H. Browne taught his small group of students in two rooms in Harvard's Felton Hall. Browne & Nichols School (B&N) was founded in 1883 by George Henry Browne, a 25-year-old Harvard graduate who, having embarked on a career as a teacher of Latin and English literature, attracted the attention of his former professors Francis J. Child and Charles Eliot Norton. Seeking an alternative to the Cambridge public schools, Child and Norton recruited Browne to teach their three sons and two other boys. At the end of that year, Browne enlisted his Harvard classmate Edgar H. Nichols to join him as the co-head of a new college preparatory school, which opened in the fall with an enrollment of 17, a number that quickly expanded.

With the formation of the school in 1883, instruction took place at 11 Appian Way, with the addition of another building at 8 Garden Street. Radcliffe College, which now occupies this land, wished to expand here, and so it made an exchange with B&N, which relocated in 1897 to a new brick building at 20 Garden Street. That building was designed by Edgar Nichols's sister-in-law, Minerva Parker Nichols, and is said to be "the first important building by a woman architect."

1889, Jeanette Markham's School

The Buckingham School was named and incorporated in 1902, but the first schoolhouse was opened in 1892, known as Miss Markham's School after its founding headmistress. Because Jeanette Markham had been conducting classes for small children in a private school since at least 1889, that is the year from which Buckingham dates its beginning.

Markham came to Cambridge from Atchison, Kansas to pursue an education at the recently founded women's college later named Radcliffe. Upon arriving in Cambridge, she found a home with Colonel Thomas Wentworth Higginson on Buckingham Street, to whom she is said to have become "virtually an elder daughter" (59). After she began teaching in a neighbor's home, another neighbor, Mrs. Richard H. Dana, offered to build a schoolhouse and living quarters nearby, where the school began with 12 students. That schoolhouse continues to be part of BB&N's Lower School campus to this day.

== Athletics ==
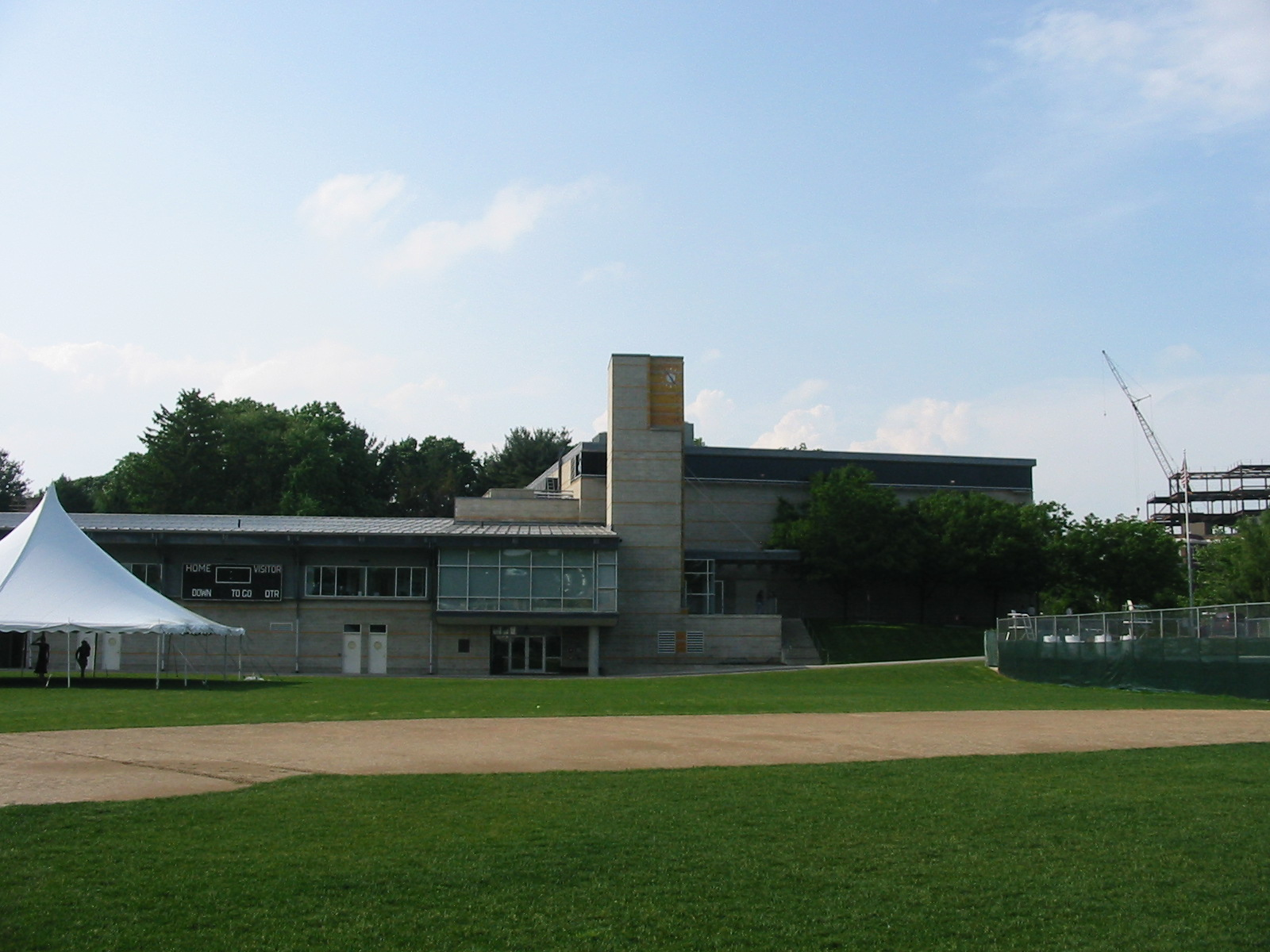
BB&N's Nicholas Athletic Center from the side.

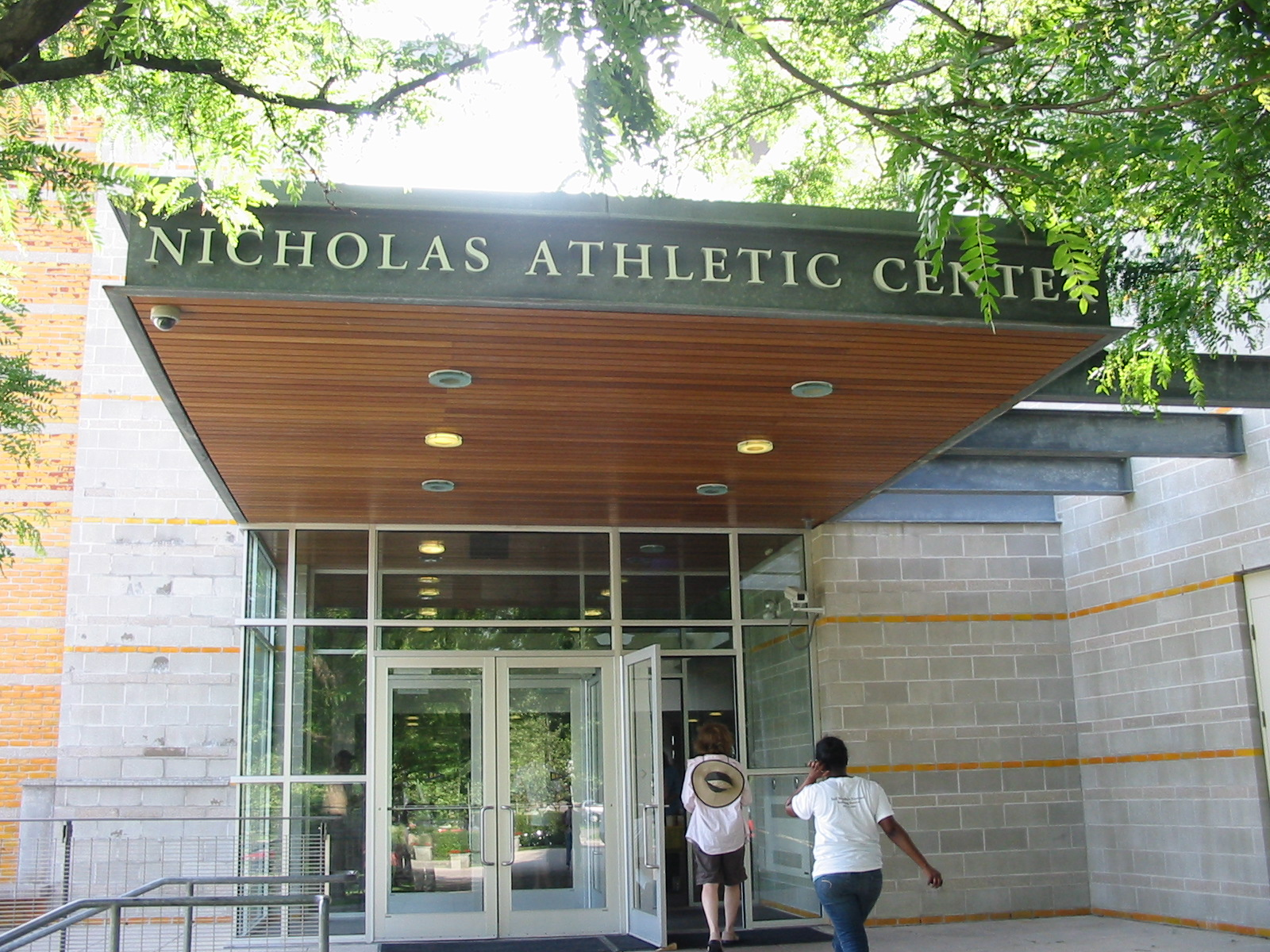
The entrance to the Nicholas Athletic Center.

=== Rowing ===
The name of the school's athletic teams, "the Knights", has its origins in a 1920s Boston Globe article which referred to the rowing team in particular, undefeated against the likes of Harvard, MIT and Kent School, as "the Black Knights of the Charles", itself a reference to the Army Black Knights. In addition to taking the team name, Browne & Nichols also took black and white as its colors after the article. The Buckingham School's colors, blue and gold, were made the combined school's colors after the merger. The school was the first American schoolboy crew to win the Henley Royal Regatta in Henley-on-Thames, England, winning the Thames Challenge Cup in 1929. The Washington Post commented:

"The Thames Challenge Cup, prize of England's famous rowing tournament, was captured today by eight young oarsmen from the Browne and Nichols School...The American boys, after each victory, gave a fine display of school spirit and overflowing "pep" which added to their already great popularity on the river...Their success was the more impressive when it is considered that the average age of the oarsmen is younger than the average of their defeated rivals. The boys will be received by the American Ambassador at London Monday and then will begin an educational tour of England."

=== Tennis ===
In 2004, the girls varsity tennis team became ISL Champions for the first time in school history. The boys varsity tennis team won the New England Class B Tournament in 2004, the 2005 ISL Championship, and finished second in the 2007 New England Class B Tournament.

=== Other sports ===
BB&N also has both girls' and boys' hockey teams.

== Notable alumni ==
=== Browne & Nichols ===
- Edward Burlingame Hill, class of 1888, American composer
- Langdon Warner, class of 1898, archaeologist, art historian, and member of World War II Monuments Men
- Richard Norton, archaeologist, professor, director of the Archaeological Institute of America
- Arthur L. Conger, class of 1899, noted theosophist and writer
- Alfred V. Kidder, class of 1903, preeminent early twentieth century archaeologist of the American Southwest and Mesoamerica
- Thomas Dudley Cabot, class of 1913, American businessman and philanthropist
- William Bosworth Castle, class of 1914, American physician and pioneer in field of hematology
- Tadeusz Adamowski, class of 1918, hockey player on Polish Olympic Team (1928), coach of national team
- Sherwin Badger, class of 1918, national figure skating champion and Silver Medal Olympian
- John Moors Cabot, class of 1919, U.S. Ambassador to five nations, Georgetown University professor
- Robert Bradford, class of 1920, Governor of Massachusetts
- Thomas Hopkinson Eliot, class of 1924, congressman from Massachusetts and chancellor of Washington University in St. Louis, politician and major figure behind the Social Security Act
- Eliot Noyes, class of 1927, architect and industrial designer
- John Caskey, class of 1927, American archaeologist and excavator of Troy
- George C. Homans, class of 1927, American sociologist and founder of behavioral sociology
- C. Conrad Wright, class of 1933, scholar and American religious historian
- Charles Pence Slichter, class of 1941, nuclear physicist and winner of the National Medal of Science
- Robert Brink, class of 1942, violinist, conductor, professor, who premiered works by Walter Piston, Henry Cowell, Alan Hovhaness, and Daniel Pinkham
- Richard A. Smith, class of 1942, president of General Cinemas, later CEO of Harcourt General
- Roger Longrigg, class of 1945, Scottish-born author of 55 popular novels
- Giles Constable, class of 1946, educator and historian of the Middle Ages
- Kirk Bryan, class of 1947, oceanographer regarded as founder of numerical ocean modeling
- Charles Colson, class of 1949, chief counsel to President Richard Nixon, Watergate indictee
- Anthony Perkins, class of 1950, actor most famous for Psycho, Equus, and Friendly Persuasion
- Jonathan Moore, class of 1950, government official specializing in foreign affairs
- Allan Rosenfield, class of 1951, physician and advocate for women's health
- Anton Kuerti, class of 1952, pianist
- Robert M. O'Neil, class of 1952, college president and founder of the Thomas Jefferson Center for the Protection of Free Expression
- Peter Haskell, class of 1953, film and television actor
- Nam Pyo Suh, class of 1955, president of KAIST
- Truman Bewley, class of 1959, economist, authority on sticky wages and namesake of Bewley models
- Deirdre McCloskey, class of 1960, economist, historian, and rhetorician
- Paul Michael Glaser, class of 1961 (did not graduate), actor
- Chris Burden, class of 1964, performance/conceptual artist
- Paul Williams, class of 1965, founder of Crawdaddy magazine
- Ben Bradlee Jr., class of 1966, The Boston Globe journalist and author
- Dave Hynes, class of 1969, former professional hockey player for the Boston Bruins
- Jeffrey Lurie, class of 1969, owner of Philadelphia Eagles
- Andy Pratt (singer-songwriter), class of 1969, rock music singer-songwriter and multi-instrumentalist
- Alexander Vershbow, class of 1970, former Ambassador to the Republic of Korea, former Ambassador to Russia, former Ambassador to NATO
- Dennis Choi, class of 1970, educator and neuroscientist
- Patrick Sullivan, class of 1971, former general manager of New England Patriots
- Jere Burns, class of 1973, actor

=== Buckingham ===
- Katharine Sergeant Angell White, class of 1910, writer and fiction editor for The New Yorker magazine, 1925–1960
- Helen B. Taussig, class of 1912, cardiologist and founder of field of pediatric cardiology
- Helenka Pantaleoni, class of 1914, silent film actress and humanitarian
- Eleanor Sayre, class of 1934, museum curator and authority on prints of Francisco Goya
- Joanne Simpson, class of 1940, NASA's lead weather researcher and first woman to earn a Ph.D. in meteorology
- Eleanor Sanger, class of 1946, Emmy Award-winning TV sports producer
- Margaret Bryan Davis, class of 1949, distinguished ecologist specializing in palynology and paleoecology
- Svetlana Alpers, class of 1953, noted art historian and author of The Art of Describing
- Susan Howe, class of 1955, poet, scholar, essayist, and critic
- Jane Holtz Kay, class of 1956, urban design and architecture critic
- Fanny Howe, class of 1958, poet, short story writer, and novelist
- Toby Lerner Ansin, Class of 1959, Founder, Miami City Ballet
- Ellen Goodman, class of 1959, Pulitzer Prize-winning journalist
- Margaret Atherton, Class of 1961, historian and philosopher
- Annalena Tonelli, Class of 1962, social activist known as "Mother Teresa of Somalia"
- Sylvia Poggioli, Class of 1964, NPR European Correspondent
- Mary Lord, Class of 1971, journalist
- Susan Butcher, Class of 1972, dog musher and four-time winner of the Iditarod Trail Sled Dog Race

=== BB&N ===
- John Grayken, class of 1974, founder and chairman of Lone Star funds
- André Balazs, class of 1975, hotelier and residential developer
- Hilary Bok, class of 1976, Henry R. Luce Professor of Bioethics and Moral & Political Theory at the Johns Hopkins University
- Charles Bailyn, class of 1977, the A. Bartlett Giamatti Professor of Astronomy and Physics at Yale University and inaugural dean of faculty at Yale-NUS College
- David Fialkow, class of 1977, venture capitalist
- James E. Baker, class of 1978, former Chief Judge of the United States Court of Appeals for the Armed Forces
- Kate Davis, class of 1978, documentary filmmaker
- Reed Hastings, class of 1978, founder and CEO of Netflix
- Jonathan Collier, class of 1979, television writer for The Simpsons and others
- Abigail Johnson, class of 1980, Fidelity Investments
- Wendy Artin, class of 1980, internationally exhibited painter
- David Cohen, class of 1981, attorney and Deputy Director of the Central Intelligence Agency from 2015–17
- Melinda McGraw, class of 1981, film and television actress
- Michael Sloan, class of 1981, Pulitzer Prize-winning illustrator and co-creator of comic Welcome to the New World
- David Kris, class of 1984, lawyer and national security expert
- Peter Ocko, class of 1984, television writer and producer
- David Sze, class of 1984, Greylock Partners, investor in Facebook and LinkedIn
- Michael Moynihan, class of 1987 (did not graduate), journalist, publisher and musician
- Nicole Cherubini, class of 1988, sculptor and visual artist
- Peter Beinart, class of 1989, editor of New Republic and Rhodes Scholar
- Agata Passent, class of 1991, Polish journalist and writer
- Alison Folland, class of 1997, award-winning film actress
- Mindy Kaling, class of 1997, actress and writer on NBC's The Office; creator and star of Fox's The Mindy Project
- Courtney Kennedy, class of 1997, US National Hockey Team player
- Scott Belsky, class of 1998, entrepreneur, author, co-creator of online portfolio platform Behance
- Joseph P. Kennedy III, class of 1999, Representative for Massachusetts' 4th Congressional District
- Rachel Platten, class of 1999, singer and songwriter of "Fight Song"
- Ari Graynor, class of 2001, Broadway and Hollywood actress
- Josh Zakim, class of 2001, Boston City Councilor
- Zeke Faux, class of 2003, journalist and author
- Loren Galler-Rabinowitz, class of 2004, noted figure skater; Miss Massachusetts 2010
- Jack Carlson, class of 2005, U.S. national team rower, World Championships bronze medalist, author
- Sarah Bullard, class of 2007, professional women's lacrosse player
- Jeremy Lewin, class of 2007, American bureaucrat who helped facilitate the disbanding of USAID
- Jake Rosenzweig, class of 2007, racing driver
- Marina Keegan, class of 2008, author of The Opposite of Loneliness
- Addie Doyle, class of 2009, Columbia Business School Cluster H president
- Stephanie McCaffrey, class of 2011, professional soccer player
- Andrew Chin, class of 2011, baseball player
- Rhett Wiseman, class of 2012, professional baseball player
- Zak Zinter, class of 2020, offensive guard for the Cleveland Browns
- Jack Panayotou, class of 2022, professional soccer player
- Ronan Hanafin, class of 2023, safety for the Clemson Tigers
