= Harutyun =

- Pronunciation: hɑɾuˈtʰi̯un
- Gender: Male

Origin
- Origin: Armenian
- Meaning: Resurrection
- Region of origin: Armenia

Other names
- Related names: Harut

Harutyun (Armenian: Հարություն and in Western Armenian Յարութիւն) also spelled Haroutioun, Harutiun and its variants Harout, Harut and Artin is a common male Armenian name; it means "resurrection" in Armenian.

== People with the name ==
=== Harutyun/Harutiun ===
- Harutyun Abrahamyan (born 1969), Armenian goalkeeper
- Harutyun Alamdaryan (1795–1834), Armenian poet and teacher
- Harutiun Alpiar (1864–1919), Ottoman Armenian journalist and humorist
- Harutyun Babayan (born 1975), Armenian politician and parliamentarian ‘
- Harutiun Bezjian (1771–1834), Ottoman Armenian merchant, financier and philanthropist
- Harutyun Chmshkyan, 20th-century Armenian politician
- Harutiun Dellalian (1937–1990), Armenian contemporary composer
- Harutyun Gharmandarian (1910–1967), Armenian painter
- Harutyun Hanesyan (1911–1987), Turkish Armenian violinist and composer
- Harutyun Hovhannisyan (born 1981), Armenian wrestler
- Harutiun Jangülian (1855–1915), Ottoman Armenian historian, politician and parliamentarian
- Harutyun Karapetyan (born 1972), Armenian football (soccer) player
- Harutyun Khachatryan (born 1955), Armenian film director, producer and screenwriter
- Harutyun Merdinyan (born 1984), Armenian artistic gymnast
- Harutyun Shmavonyan (1750–1824), Armenian priest and founder of Armenian journalism
- Harutyun Sayatyan (1712–1795), Armenian musician and composer, more widely known as Sayat Nova
- Harutiun Shahrigian (1860–1915), Ottoman Armenian politician, soldier, lawyer and author
- Harutiun Svadjian (1831–1874), Ottoman Armenian writer, politician, teacher and humorist
- Harutyun Vardanyan (born 1970), Armenian footballer
- Harutyun Varpurciyan, 20th-century Turkish Armenian architect
- Harutyun Yenokyan (born 1985), Armenian wrestler

=== Haroutioun ===
- Haroutioun Hovanes Chakmakjian (1878–1973), Armenian American published scientist, chemistry professor and scholar
- Haroutiun Galentz (1910–1967), Armenian painter

=== Harout ===
- DerHova (born Harout Der-Hovagimian in 1974), Canadian-Armenian composer, songwriter and record producer
- Harout Chitilian (born 1980), Canadian city councillor from Montreal, Quebec of Lebanese Armenian origin
- Harout Pamboukjian (born 1950), Armenian American pop singer, also known as Dzakh Harut
- Magda Harout (1926–2021), American actress of Armenian origin
- Harout O. Sanasarian (born 1929), Armenian American teacher and politician

=== Harut ===
- Harut Grigorian (born 1989), Armenian-Belgian kickboxer
- Harut Sassounian (born 1950), Armenian-American writer, public activist and publisher of The California Courier

=== Artin ===
- Artin Boşgezenyan, an Armenian deputy for Aleppo in the first (1908–1912), second (April–August 1912) and third (1914–1918) Ottoman Parliaments of the Constitutional Era
- Artin Hindoğlu, 19th-century Ottoman etymologist, interpreter, professor, linguist, and writer of the first modern French-Turkish dictionary
- Artin Penik (1921–1982), Turkish-Armenian protester who committed suicide by self-immolation

== See also ==
- Artin (name)
- Harut (disambiguation)
- Harutyunyan
- Surp Harutyun (disambiguation)
