= Mary Lord =

Mary Lord may refer to:

- Mary Dimmick Harrison (1858–1948), born Mary Scott Lord, second wife of U.S. president Benjamin Harrison
- Mary Lord (correspondent) (born c. 1954), correspondent for U.S. News & World Report
- Mary Lou Lord (born 1965), indie folk musician
- Mary Pillsbury Lord (1904–1978), U.S. delegate to the United Nations General Assembly
- Mary Lord (painter) (born 1931), English landscape painter
- Mary G. Lord (born 1955), American author and journalist
