= Nishan Yaubyan =

Nişan Yaubyan or Nishan Yaubyan (born Istanbul, Turkey) is a prominent Turkish-Armenian architect and lecturer.

== Life ==
Of Armenian descent, Yaubyan graduated from the Getronagan Armenian High School in the Karaköy district of Istanbul. After studying architecture at Istanbul Technical University, he continued his studies at the University of Michigan. After returning to Istanbul, he became an instructor and lecturer at the Yeditepe University in Istanbul. Together with architects Güntekin Aydoğan and Osep Sarafoğlu, he designed the SSK Hospital in Beyoğlu. One of his most important projects was the Sakarya Hükümet Konağı (or the local government building of Sakarya), completed in 1956. Yaubyan worked alongside architects such as Rum architect Avyerinos Andonyadis, Turkish Armenian architect Harutyun Varpurciyan, Osep Sarafian and Enis Kortan.

He died on August 8, 2022.

== Awards ==
- 1958 Brussels Exposition Turkish Pavilion Competition, Honorable Mention Award (along with Avyerinos Andonyadis and Enis Kortan)
- Sakarya Government House Competition, First Prize (Avyerinos Andonyadis, with Enis Kortan and Harutyun Vapurciyan)
- Kocatepe Mosque Competition, 1957, Third Prize (together with Sarafoğlu Osep)
- On May 24, 2003 the Association of Independent Architects of Turkey honored him for his successful architectural contributions.
