= Christopher Atamian =

New York-based critic, writer, curator, filmmaker and translator

- Born: New York City, United States
- Occupation: Critic, writer, curator, filmmaker and translator
- Language: English Armenian French
- Education: Harvard University (magna cum laude in literature); The Swiss Federal Institute of Technology Zurich; USC Film School; Columbia Business School (MBA)

Christopher Peter Atamian (/əˈteɪmɪən/) is a New York-based literary critic, writer, translator, curator and filmmaker who was the recipient of the 2015 Ellis Island Medal of Honor. He has translated works from French and Armenian into English including; The Bois de Vincennes (2013), The Rosy Future of War (1999), Fifty Years of Armenian Literature in France (2016), and Trashland (2023).

Born to immigrants, he grew up and studied in the United States where he received his BA in literature from Harvard University and the Swiss Federal Institute of Technology Zurich as a Fulbright fellow. He then studied at USC School of Cinematic Arts and Columbia Business School, where he received an MBA in international media. In 2013, he was awarded the Tölölyan Literary Prize for translating Nigoghos Sarafian's The Bois de Vincennes and Austin in 2017 for his debut poetry collection A Poet in Washington Heights (2018).

== Biography ==
=== Early life: background and education ===
Atamian was born in New York City to immigrant Swiss-Italian and Lebanese-Armenian parents. He studied at the Lycée Français de New York and graduated from Collegiate School in 1985. Atamian earned his BA in Literature at Harvard University (1985–1989). He later proceeded to the Swiss National Polytechnic in Zürich on a Fulbright Fellowship. He is also an alumnus of USC Film School and Columbia Business School, where he earned his MBA in International Media.

=== Career breakthrough: curation and filmmaking ===
Atamian is the co-founder and curator of Atamian Hovsepian Curatorial Practice, a gallery and cultural center located in New York City. AHCP seeks to exhibit the full spectrum of creators including women, LGBTQ+, BIPOC, SWANA and other artists and practices whose methods, forms and expressions have been unrecognized or marginalized. Atamian has directed and produced short videos and films including Sarafian's Desire, a short video based on his translation of Nigoghos Sarafian's The Bois de Vincennes. His work has also been screened at the 2009 Venice Art Biennale as part of Voulu/Obligé Armenian Diaspora Pavilion as part of Berlin's Underconstruction Artist collective.

Atamian co-produced the OBIE Award-winning play Trouble in Paradise(2006), Dear Armen (2014), MTV music videos, the dance film Psychic Data Mining and an experimental film For You, My Beloved Grandparents, which screened at the 2005 Yerevan International Film Festival (now called Golden Apricot International Film Festival).

Atamian has authored several screenplays, including The Plagiarist, Resurrection Myth/Harnoomi Arasbel which was screened at the 2021 ARPA International Film Festival (Arpa IFF), 2021 Tokyo International Short Film Festival and received Gulbenkian Foundation’s 2020 Be Heard! Prize.

== Publications ==
=== Translations: from French to English ===
- The Rosy Future of War, by Philippe Delmas, Free Press, 1999
- Fifty Years of Armenian Literature in France, by Krikor Beledian, 2016, Fresno State University Press
- Trashland, by Denis Donikian, Nauset Press, 2023
- A History of the Armenian Language, by Marc Nichanian, Fresno State University press, forthcoming in 2024
- Literature and Catastrophe, by Marc Nichanian, Fresno State University Press, forthcoming in 2024

=== Translations: from Armenian to English ===
- The Bois de Vincennes, by Nigoghos Sarafian, Michigan State University Press, 2013
- Ararat by Davit Hakobyan, AGBU Books, 2022
- The Anointment, by Vahe Oshagan, forthcoming, 2025

== Writing career ==
=== Creative writing ===
Atamian's first book of poetry A Poet in Washington Heights received the 2017 Tölölyan Literary Prize. His essays have appeared in; The New Criterion, The Hye-Phen Magazine, Rusted Radishes: Beirut Literary and Art Journal, The Los Angeles Review of Books, The Harpy Hybrid Review and Yerevan Magazine. His essay As I Lay Dying: AIDS and Perec's Endotic was awarded second prize in the Question Your Teaspoons international essay competition, co-sponsored by IALA and Oxford University.

=== Journalism and criticism ===
Atamian co-published and edited KGB Magazine. He is the former dance critic for the New York Press and has written for The New York Times Book Review, Vogue, New York, Dance Magazine, The Brooklyn Rail, HuffPost, Scenes Media, The Armenian Mirror-Spectator, and the non-profit online weekly magazine EVN Report.

== View ==
=== Armenian and LGBTQ ===
Atamian had been a supporter of the LGBTQ community serving as the president of AGLA NY (an organization which fights to help bridge the understanding gap between the LGBTQ communities in Armenia and the Armenian Diaspora and its respective societies-at-large) for two consecutive terms. He was profiled in the Aurora Prize's 100 Lives as one of the most prominent members of Armenian diaspora.

== Awards and grants ==
Atamian was awarded the 2015 Ellis Island Medal of Honor. He has also received two Calouste Gulbenkian Foundation grants for translation. In 2013, he was awarded the Tölölyan Literary Prize for his translation of Nigoghos Sarafian's The Bois de Vincennes.
