= Artin =

Artin may refer to:

- Artin (name), a surname and given name, including a list of people with the name
  - Artin, a variant of Harutyun, an Armenian given name
- 15378 Artin, a main-belt asteroid
