= Vazken Andréassian =

Armenian-born French engineer and writer

- Վազգէն Անդրէասեան
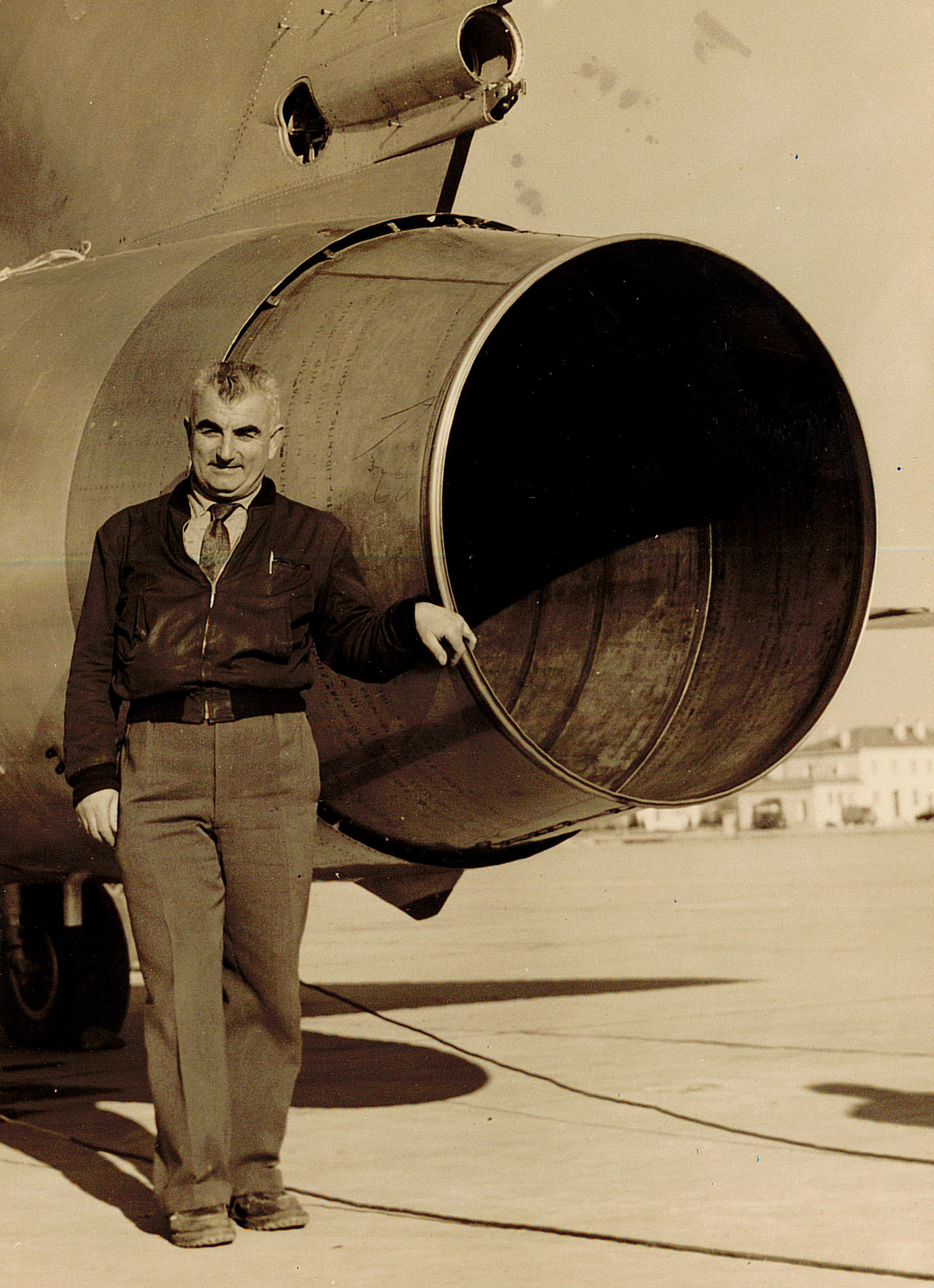
- Born: 10 April 1903; Hazari, Ottoman Empire
- Died: 30 November 1995 (aged 92)
- Occupations: Engineer, author

Vazken Andréassian (Armenian: Վազգէն Անդրէասեան; 10 April 1903 – 30 November 1995) was a French engineer and author of Armenian descent.

== Childhood ==
Vazken Andréassian was born in the village of Hazari (now Anıl), Çemişgezek in the Ottoman Empire. He lived there until the destruction of the village in 1915. He later related his experiences in a three-volume book titled Hazariabadoum. After the village's destruction, he entered Tchimichgadzak Armenian school under the direction of Boghos Zenneyan.

== Deportation and exile ==
Following the beginning of the Armenian genocide on 13 June 1915, Turkish gendarmes came to Hazari under the pretext of protecting the Armenian population. However, much of the local population was deported, exiled from Turkey to Syria, or exterminated.

Those villagers who escaped, including the Andréassians, took refuge in Kurdish villages where they were protected from the Turkish gendarmes who were hunting them. After spending the winter under the protection of the Kurds in Akrag village, hunger drove the family to the Russian lines in Erznga. Andréassian moved to Tiflis where he was housed in a refugee camp. There he met Vahan Totovents, with whom he worked at the editorial office of the Hayasdan newspaper, founded by General Andranik Ozanian. He studied briefly at the Edchmiadzine seminary, which was later closed because of the Russian Revolution. After this he moved to Vladicaucase. Upon hearing of the armistice ending World War I, Andréassian left for Constantinople. In Constantinople, he studied at the Central Armenian School and was mentored by its director Kegham Kavafyan. He graduated in 1923.

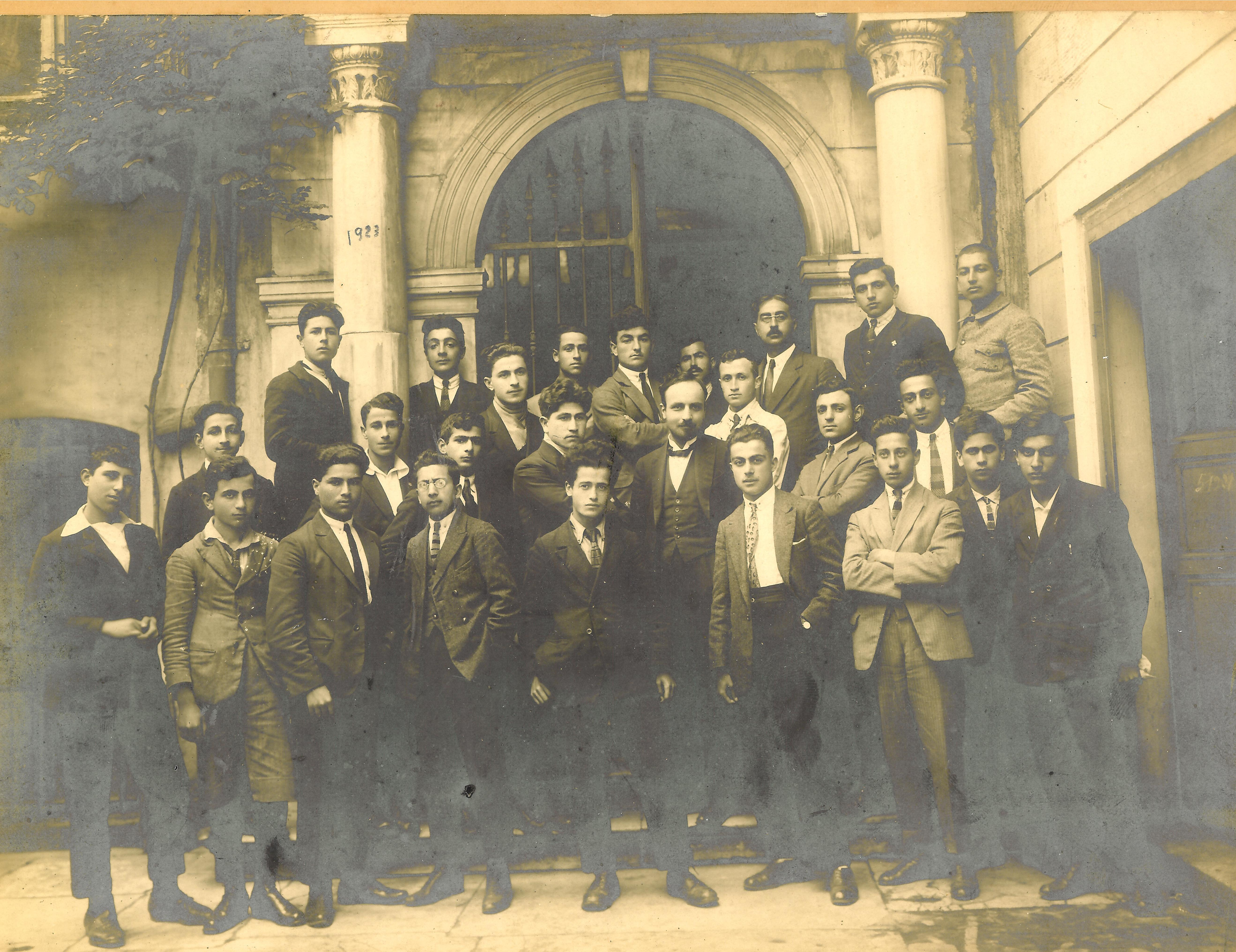
The 1923 class of the Central Armenian School, with the director, Kegham Kavafyan, at center.

== Exile in France ==
Under pressure from Turkish nationalists, Allied forces, which had occupied Constantinople since the end of World War I, evacuated the town in 1923. This resulted in the departure of many Christians, who felt unsafe. Vazken Andréassian left Constantinople for Marseille, France. With the help and financial support of Commandant Zadig Khanzadian, he entered the École nationale des arts et métiers, in Aix-en-Provence and graduated in 1927.

== Work in the aeronautical industry ==
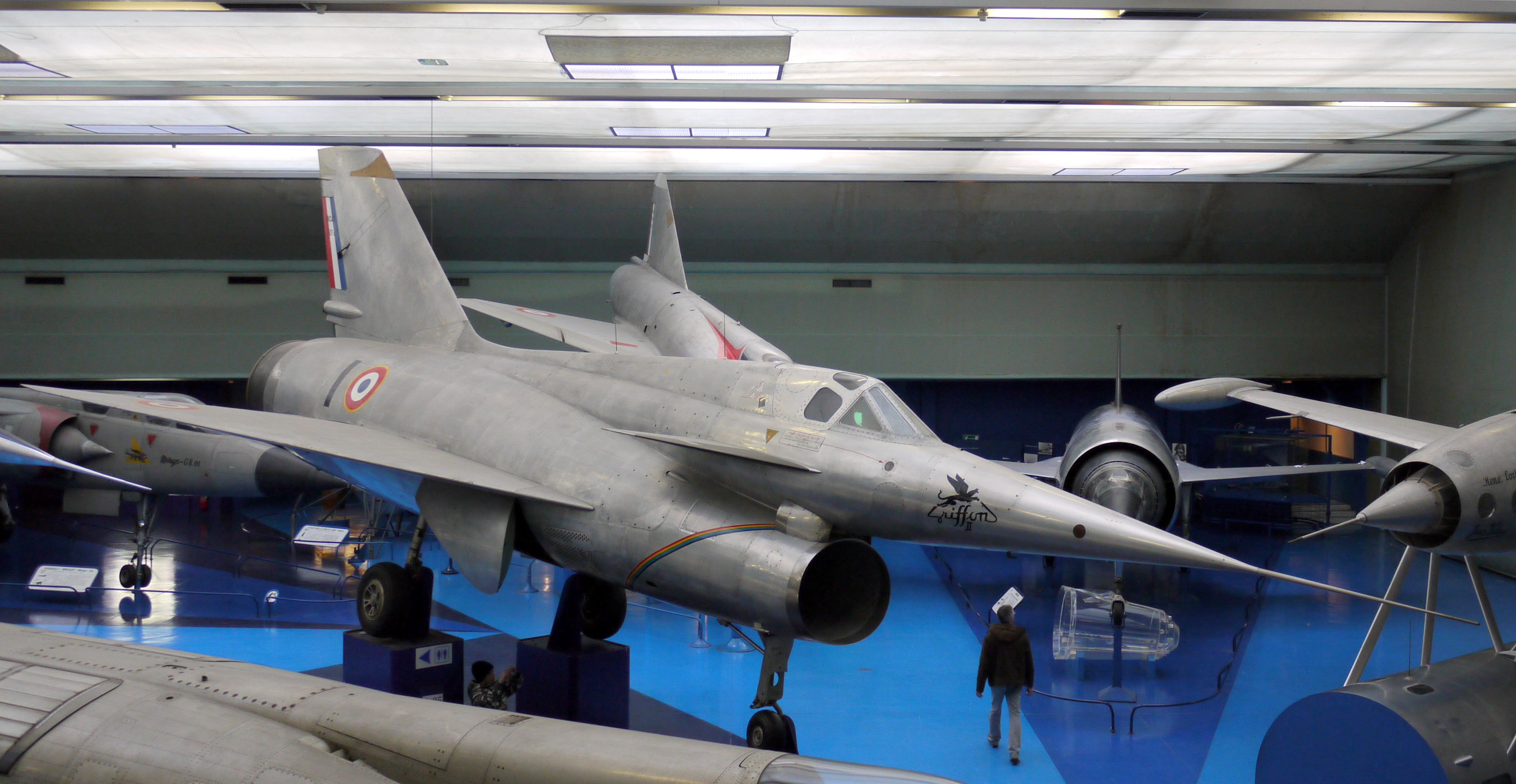
Griffon in the Bourget aeronautical museum

Andréassian worked for the Arsenal de l'Aéronautique, which later became Nord-Aviation. He took part in the design study for the Arsenal VG-70. He then worked on the construction of the prototype Arsenal VG-70, the prototype Gerfaut, and the prototype Griffon.

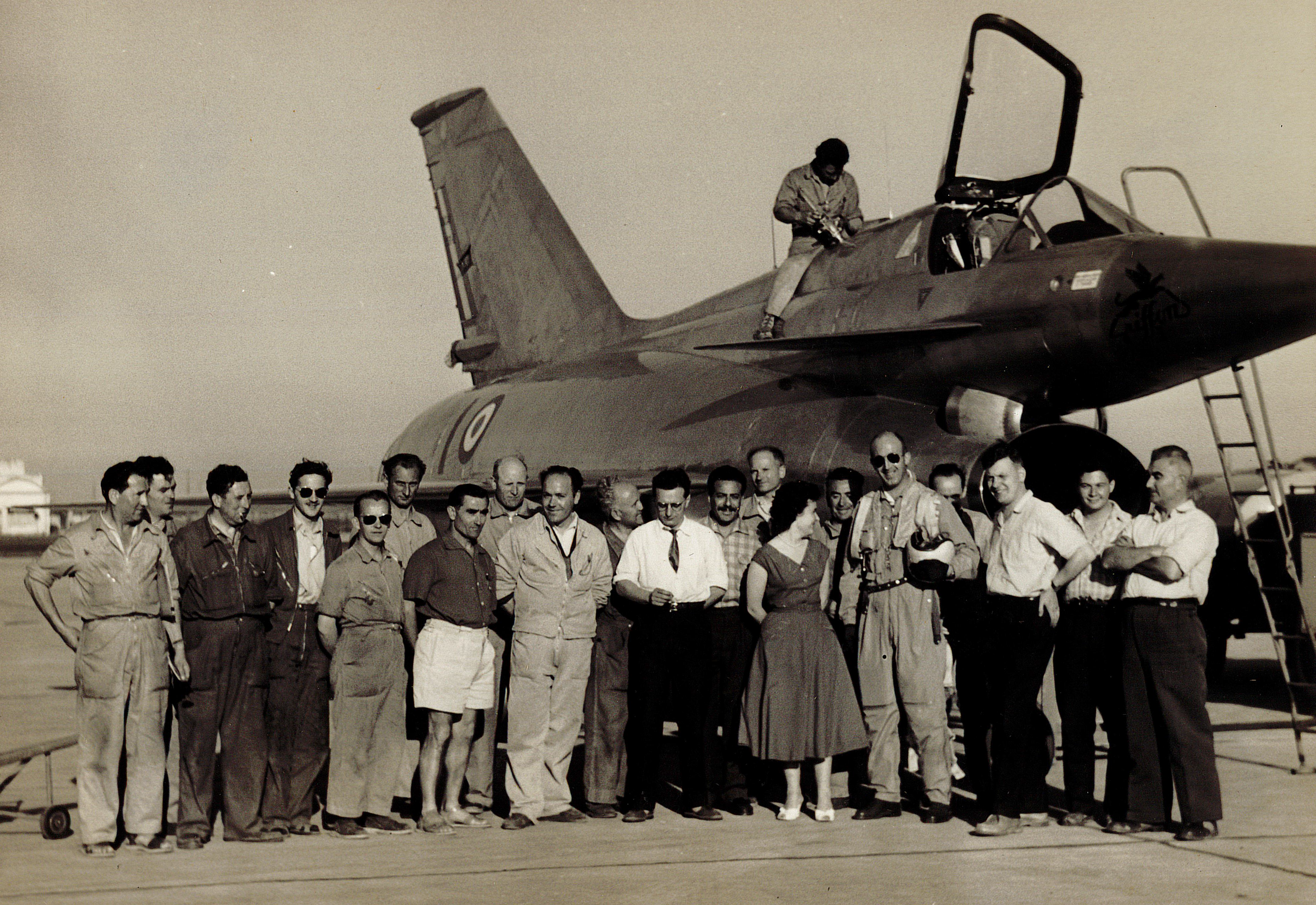
The conception team surrounding André Turcat: Andréassian is standing at the extreme right

== Contributions to Scouting ==
Andréassian was a member of the Scouting movement from 1913 onwards, first as a member of the Tchmchgadzak troop, then as a member of the Homenetmen movement after 1918.

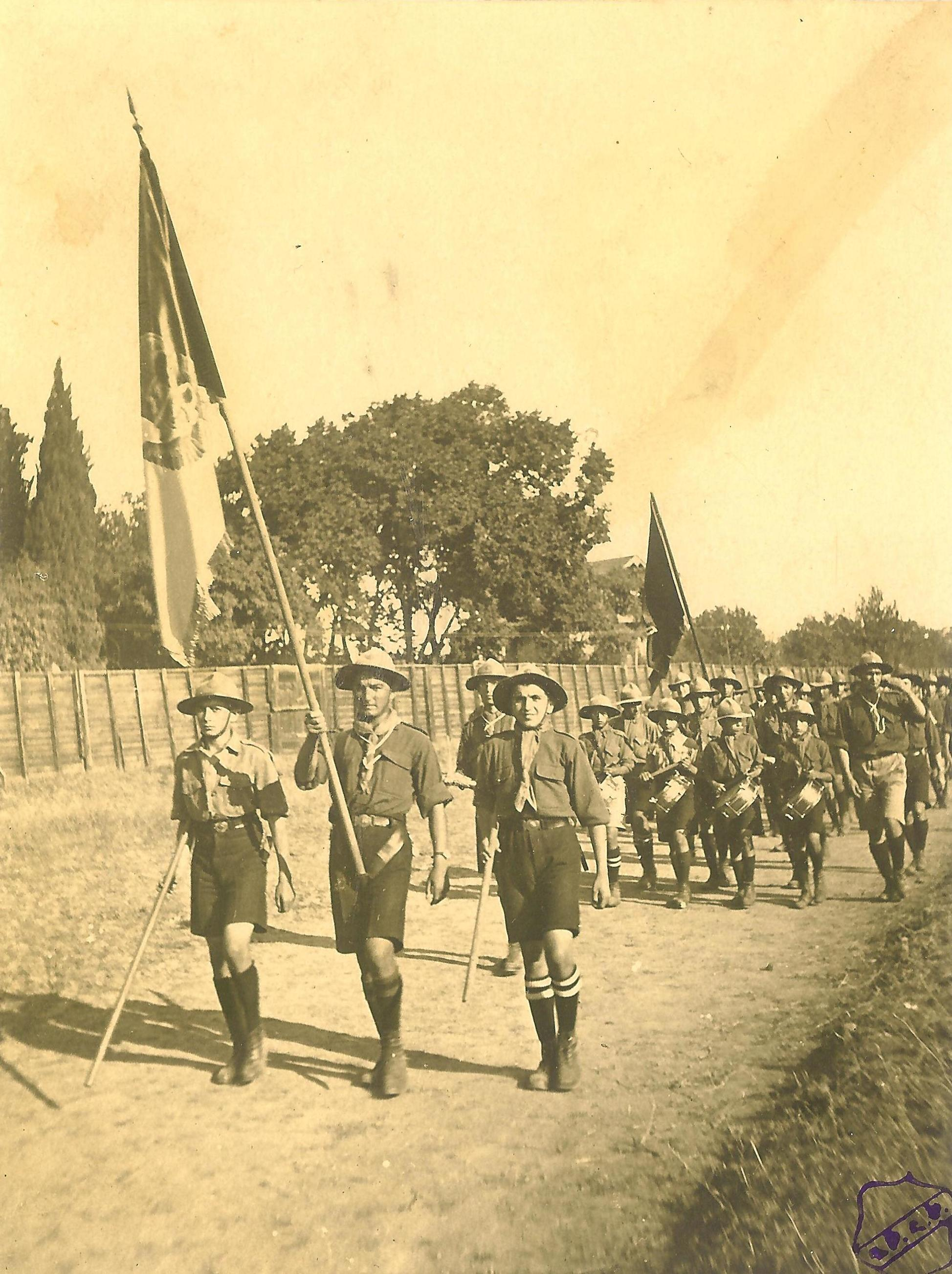
Parade of the Homenetmen Armenian Scouts in Constantinople in 1918; V. Andréassian carries the flag

In July 1924, he founded the Marseille branch of Homenetmen, and the first troop of Armenian Scouts in France. He became the commissioner of the Armenian Scouts in France after World War II.

== Personal life ==
Vazken Andréassian was the brother-in-law of Vahan Cheraz and the cousin of the Armenian-American writers, Jack (Ardavazt) Antreassian and Antranig Antreassian. He was the grandfather of the hydrologist of the same name.

== Books ==
- Հայ սկաուտին առաջնորդը - The guide of the Armenian Scout: Der Hagopian printing office, Paris, 1947, 312 pages. electronic book here
- Վահան Չերազ և իր երգն Հայաստանի - Vahan Cheraz: Sevan printing office, Beyrouth, 1977, 544 pages.
- Անդրանիկ – Պետրոս Մարզպանեան - Antranig, followed by Bedros Marzbanian: Doniguian printing office, Beyrouth, 1982, 326 p.
- Հազարիապատում - Hazariabadoum – Tome I. Doniguian printing office, Beyrouth, 1985, 316 p. electronic book here
- Հազարիապատում – հատոր Բ. Hazariabadoum, Tome II. Doniguian printing office, Beyrouth, 1984, 299 p. electronic book here
- Հազարիապատում – հատոր Գ. Hazariabadoum, Tome III. Doniguian printing office, Beyrouth, 1994, 650 p.
- Hazari : vie et survie d'un village arménien après juin 1915 (in French), 1995. electronic book here
