= Getronagan Armenian High School =

Coordinates: 41°01′32″N 28°58′42″E

- Getronagan Ermeni Lisesi; Ազգային Կեդրոնական Վարժարան
- Karaköy, Istanbul, Turkey

Information
- Type: Private
- Established: 1886
- Principal: Silva Kuyumciyan
- Enrollment: 182 (2001)
- Website: www.getronagan.k12.tr

Getronagan is an Armenian minority high school in the Karaköy district of Istanbul, Turkey, The school is attached to the Saint Gregory the Illuminator Church.

== Establishment ==
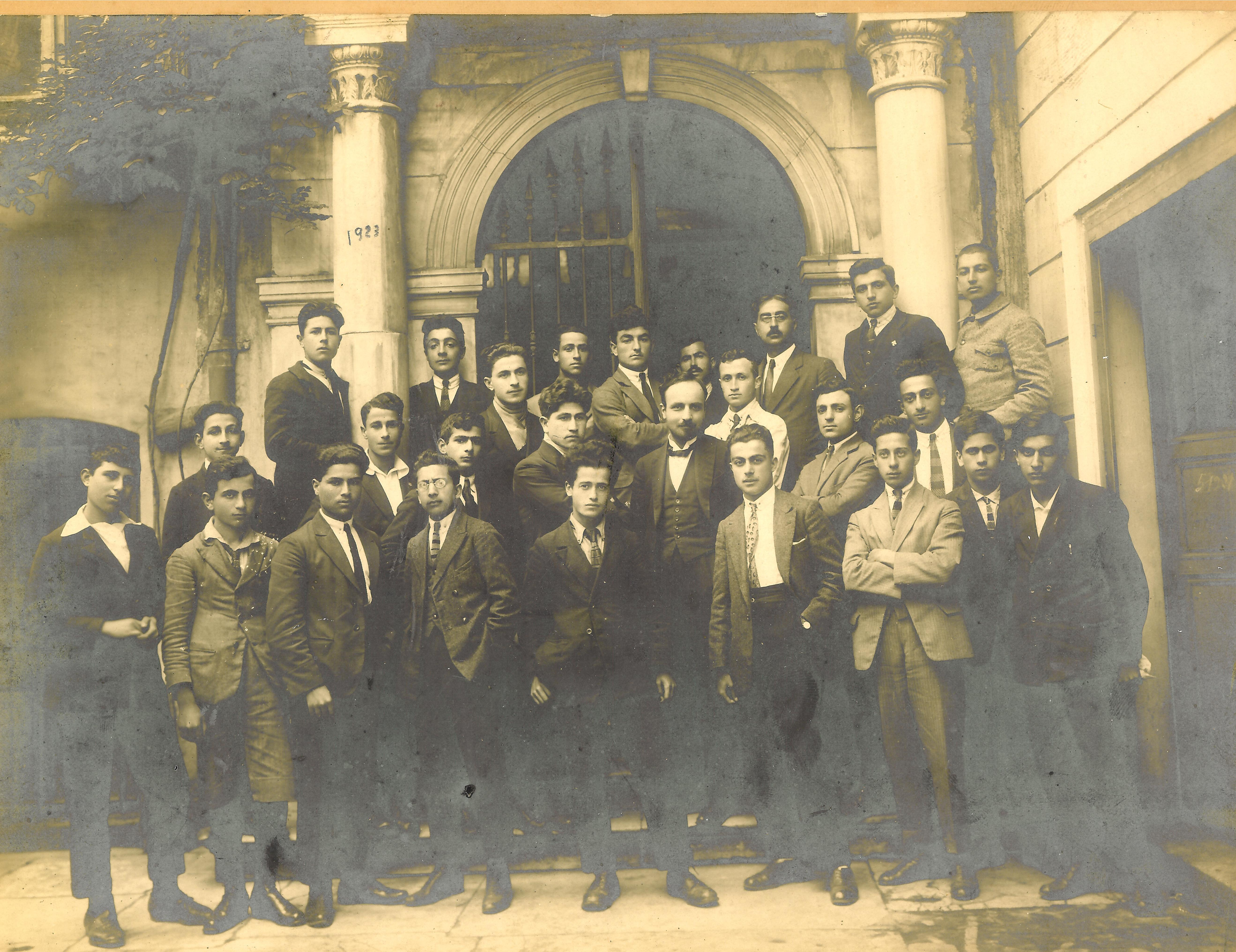
Class of 1923 with principal Kegham Kavafyan; Nigoghos Sarafian is on his left)

Getronagan High School opened its doors on September 1, 1886. The Catholicos (the leader of the Armenian Apostolic Church) and the Armenian Patriarch of İstanbul helped lead the opening commencement. Minas Cheraz was its first principal.

== 21st century ==
As of 2014 Getronagan teaches both genders. In 2001 the school had 182 students. The school teaches mainly in Turkish and also has classes in Armenian language, literature and religion. English (compulsory), French and Spanish are taught as foreign languages.

== Notable alumni ==
- Hrachia Adjarian - linguist
- Vazken Andréassian - engineer
- Şahan Arzruni - pianist
- Hayko Cepkin - singer
- Arshag Chobanian - writer
- Ara Güler - photographer
- Aram Haigaz - writer
- Karekin II Kazanjian - patriarch
- Mıgırdiç Margosyan - writer, Principal of Surp Haç
- Misak Metsarents - poet
- Sarkis Minassian - journalist
- Kegham Parseghian - writer
- Nigoghos Sarafian - writer, poet
- Levon Shant - writer, poet
- Soghomon Tehlirian - assassin of Talaat Pasha
- Léon Arthur Tutundjian - painter
- Harutyun Varpurciyan - architect
- Nishan Yaubyan - architect
- Yerukhan - writer

== Notable teachers and faculty ==
- Melkon Giurdjian - writer
- Hovhannes Hintliyan - educator (principal)
- Zareh Kalfayan - painter
- Kegham Kavafyan - architect (principal)
- Vahan Tekeyan - writer, poet (principal)
- Tovmas Terzian - writer, playwright

== See also ==
- Armenians in Istanbul
- Education in the Ottoman Empire
