= Arutyunov =

Arutyunov or Arutiunov (feminine: Arutyunova, Arutiunova) is a Russian-language Armenian patronymic surname derived from the Russified Armenian given name Arutyun (Harutyun) with the Russian Patronymic suffix -ov. The native Armenian patronymic is Harutyunyan (various transliterations). Notable people with the surname include:

- Albert Arutiunov
- Aram Arutyunov
- Georges Arutyunov
- Grigory Arutyunov
- Karekin Arutyunov
- Valery Arutyunov
