= Süreyya Opera House =

Opera house and former cinema in Istanbul, Turkey

Süreyya Operası
- Süreyya Opereti; Süreyya Sineması
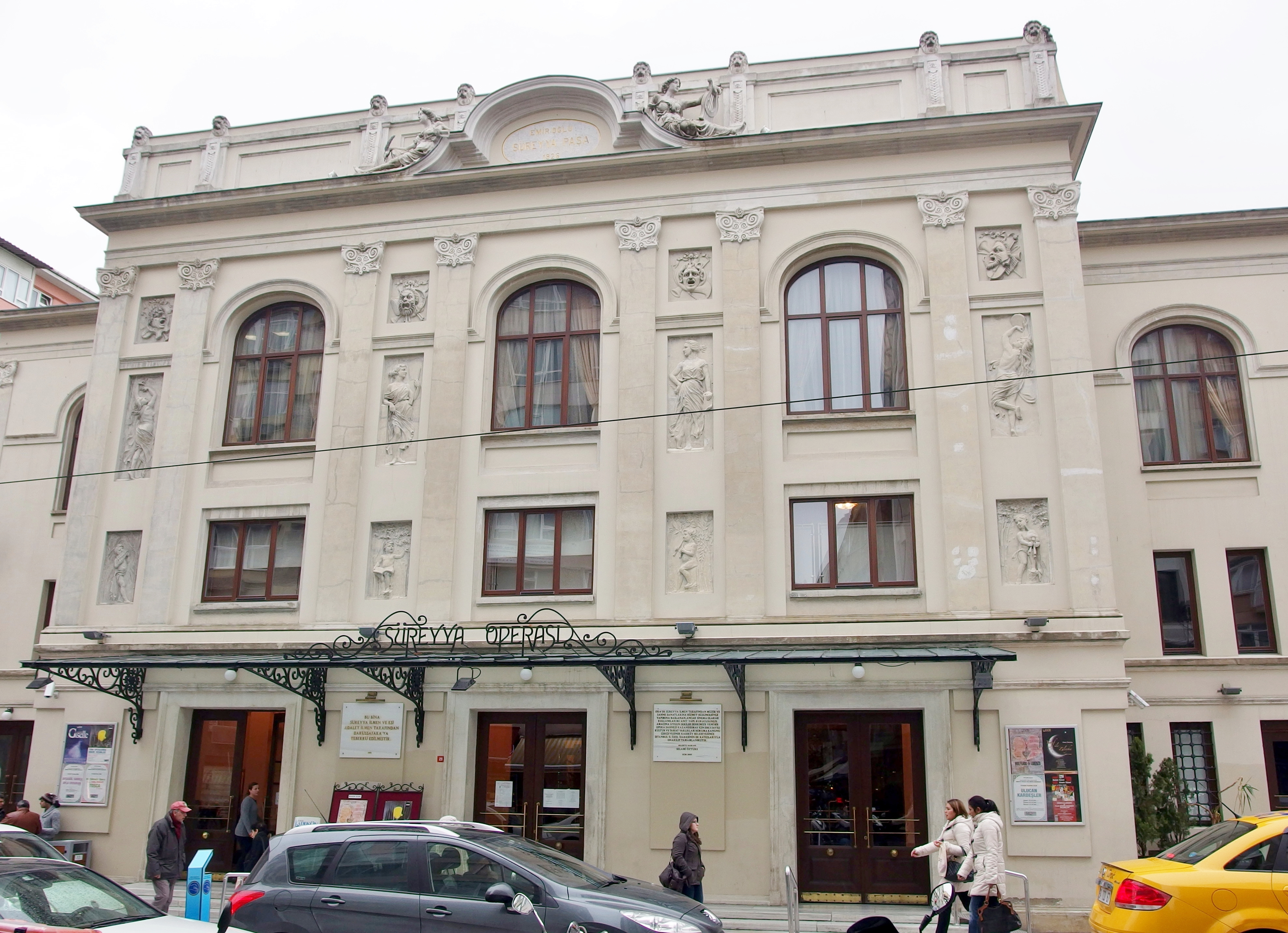
- Süreyya Opera House
- Interactive map of Süreyya Operası
- Address: Gen. Asım Gündüz Cad. 29; 34710 Kadıköy, Istanbul; Turkey
- Coordinates: 40.98805°N 29.02864°E
- Owner: Darüşşafaka Association
- Operator: Istanbul State Opera and Ballet
- Capacity: 570
- Type: Opera and ballet theatre, concert hall
- Current use: Opera house

Construction
- Opened: March 6, 1927
- Reopened: December 14, 2007
- Rebuilt: 2006–2007
- Years active: 1927–1930 theatre 1930–2005 movie theatre 2007–present opera house
- Architect: Kegham Kavafyan

Tenant
- Municipality of Kadıköy

Website
- https://sureyyaoperasi.kadikoy.bel.tr/en/about-us

Süreyya Opera House, also called Süreyya Cultural Center (Turkish: Süreyya Operası or Süreyya Kültür Merkezi), is an opera hall located at Gen. Asım Gündüz Avenue No: 29, in the Bahariye quarter of the Kadıköy district in Istanbul, Turkey. The building was designed by Ottoman Armenian architect Kegham Kavafyan by the order of a Deputy for Istanbul, Süreyya İlmen. It was originally established in 1927 as the first musical theatre on the Anatolian part of Istanbul. However, due to the lack of appropriate facilities and equipment at the theatre, operettas weren't staged until 2007. The venue was rather used as a movie theatre until the building underwent a functional restoration and reopened as an opera house on December 14, 2007.

== History ==
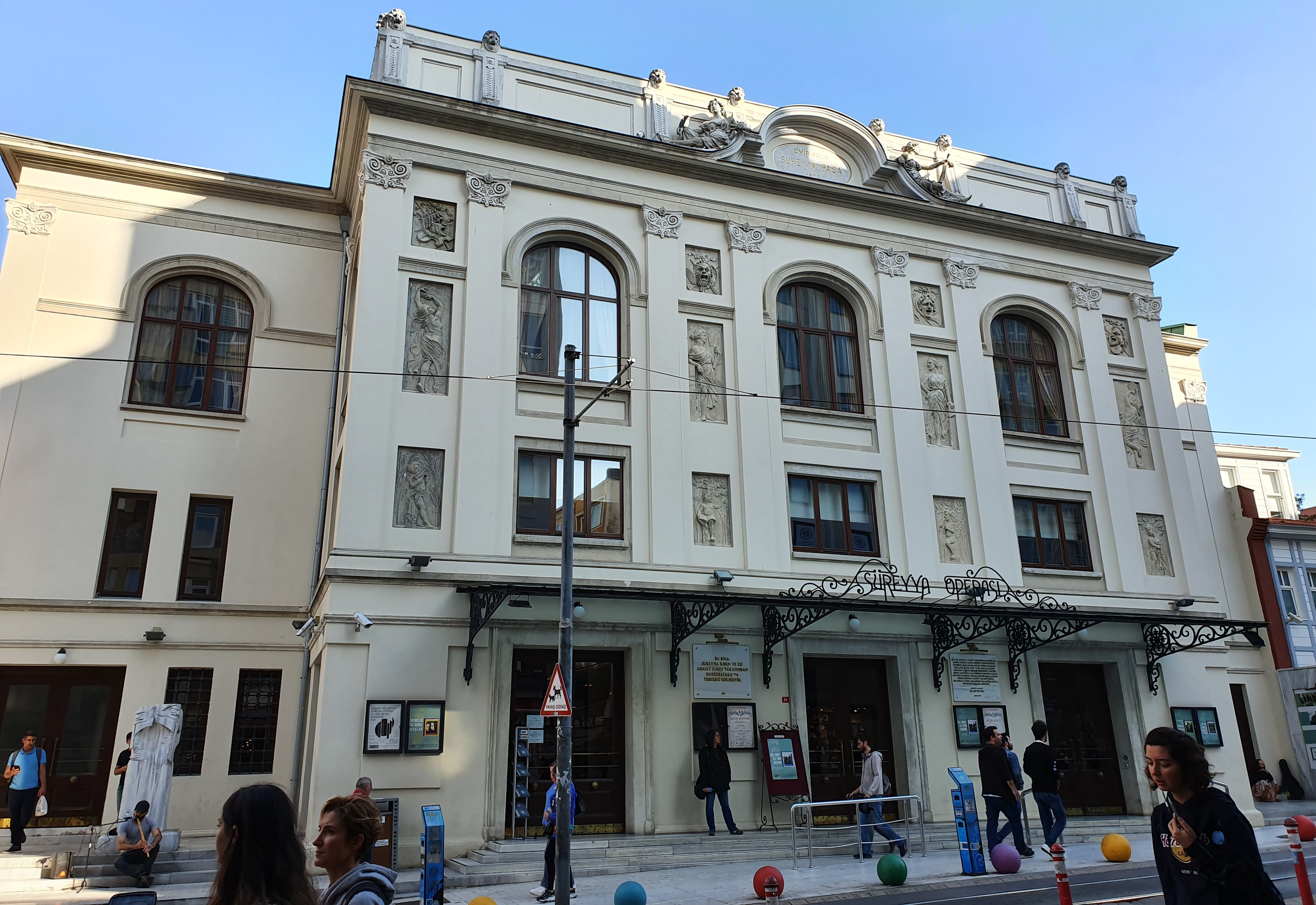
A view of the front facade on General Asım Gündüz Avenue in Bahariye, Kadıköy, Istanbul

Süreyya Pasha (later Süreyya İlmen) started the construction of the building in 1924 to meet the need of a venue for cultural and social events, which was lacking in Kadıköy. He was impressed by the glamour of famous theatres in Europe during his visits. The aesthetic and functional influences in the architectural design of the building are reflected in the foyer, an example of Art Deco inspired by the Champs-Elysées Theatre in Paris, and in the interior, which displays stylistical characteristics of German architecture. By the order of the Deputy of Istanbul, Süreyya İlmen, Kegham Kavafyan was appointed as the architect who would design the Süreyya Opera House, which was completed in 1927. Called the Süreyya Opereti (English: Süreyya Operetta) and opened on March 6, 1927, the theatre was the first venue for opera in the Asian side of Istanbul and the sixth in the entire city.

Since the stage of the musical theatre was not wholly completed and no artists' rooms were provided, operetta performances did not take place at all. Only theatre plays were performed some days a week. In 1930, technical equipment needed to screen sound films were installed and henceforth the venue was renamed as Süreyya Sineması (English: Süreyya Cinema). Hikmet Nâzım, father of the renowned poet Nâzım Hikmet, was the movie theatre's first manager.

The ballroom at the second floor served for many years as a wedding hall. It hosted the theater group Kadıköy Sahnesi (English: Kadıköy Stage) for five years starting from 1959. Later, the space was used as an apparel workshop.

Süreyya İlmen donated the theatre in 1950 to Darüşşafaka Cemiyeti, a charitable organization for the advancement of the education of orphan children in poverty, with the condition to receive the revenues during his or his wife's lifetime. He died in 1955 and his wife Adalet İlmen died in 1966. The cinema, taken over by the charity society, was then run first by their daughter and then by the grandsons of Süreyya İlmen.

The audience hall of the Süreyya Cinema was renovated in 1996, and state of the art technical equipment were acquired in 2003. Also, the exterior of the building underwent a reconditioning in accordance with the original design. However, all these efforts and the investments made for modernization did not bring the expected result to increase the audience.

== Redevelopment ==
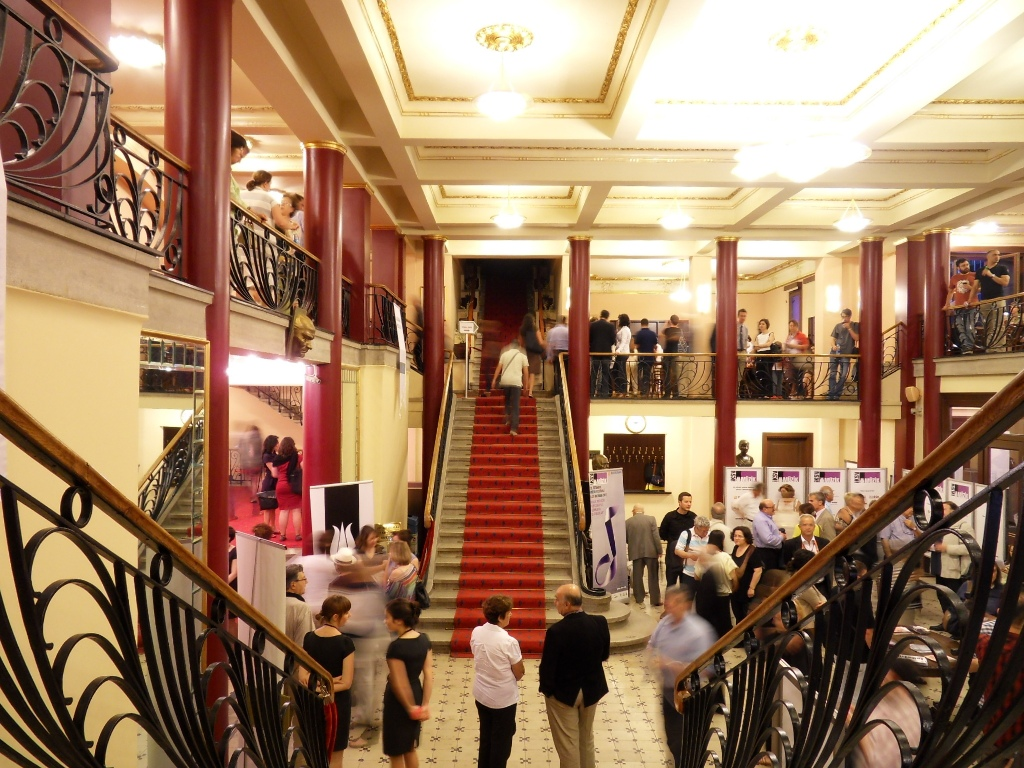
Foyer of Süreyya Opera House

By the beginning of 2006, Kadıköy Municipality under Mayor Selami Öztürk launched a redevelopment project after leasing the building in August 2005 from the Darüşşafaka Association for a term of 40 years. The restoration included the frescos at the ceiling and on the walls, and the sculptures on the facade. The construction works lasted almost two years and the cost amounted to around 14 million YTL (approx. $9m).

Süreyya Opera House reopened on December 14, 2007, performing the oratorio Yunus Emre (Opus 26) by Ahmet Adnan Saygun. Thus, Süreyya Pasha's dream of an opera house came true after 80 years.

The theatre stage has a width of 14 metres, depth of 10 metres and height of 4.90 metres, with an orchestra pit added newly. There are 14 dressing rooms that were built without changing the architecture of the building. The audience capacity of the opera house is 570 seats. The ballroom on the second floor can accommodate 500 guests.

The opera house is home to the Istanbul State Opera and Ballet. Opera and ballet performances are staged three days a week at the venue. The venue also hosts events such as art exhibitions, festivities and celebrations like the Republic Day Ball.

== See also ==
- Atatürk Cultural Center - main opera house of Istanbul
- Naum Theatre - main opera house of Istanbul in the 19th century
- Zorlu PSM - largest performing arts theatre and concert hall in Istanbul
- Kadıköy Haldun Taner Stage
