= Melkon Giurdjian =

Armenian writer, professor, and civic activist

- Մելքոն Հրանդ Կիւրճեան
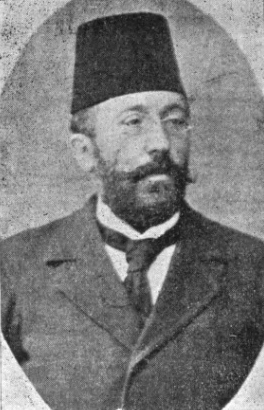
- Melkon Guirdjian
- Born: 1859; Palu, Ottoman Empire
- Died: 1915 (aged 55–56); Ankara, Ottoman Empire
- Occupations: Writer, professor

Melkon Hrand Guirdjian (Armenian: Մելքոն Հրանդ Կիւրճեան, 1859 in Palu, Ottoman Empire – 1915 in Ankara, Ottoman Empire) was an Armenian writer, professor, and civic activist.

== Biography ==
Melkon Guirdjian was born in the Havav village in the Palu region that is now considered Elazığ. Guirdjian attended the local Armenian school. He then moved to Constantinople at age 11 where he attended the prestigious Jemaran Armenian School of Üsküdar. After completing his studies at Jemaran and later Surp Hac Tbrevank, he became a teacher from 1878 to 1896. He taught Armenian history, language, and culture in many Armenian schools such as the prestigious Getronagan Armenian High School.

In 1893 he was imprisoned for alleged political activity. Due to the political instability, he fled to Varna, Bulgaria. In Varna, he founded the Armenian school Artzrunian, which served as a haven for Armenian refugees. During his absence from Constantinople, his house was searched by local police and many of his manuscripts and writings were burned. He felt the need to return in 1898 and was immediately arrested once again upon return. After spending 6 months in prison, Guirdjian escaped to Kastamonu, where he remained for 10 years. During his stay in Kastamonu, he gave Armenian literature and history lessons covertly. In 1906, on the basis of a secret agent's reports, his literary pieces were once again destroyed.

When the Young Turk Revolution succeeded in 1908, Guirdjian returned to Constantinople and began participating in civic and literary activities once again.

== Death ==
On April 24, 1915, Melkon Guirdjian along with other prominent intellectuals and figures of the Constantinople's Armenian community were deported to unknown destinations within the interior provinces of Ottoman Turkey as part of the Armenian genocide. Melkon Guirdjian found himself in the outskirts of Ankara and was ultimately killed by Turkish gendarmes.
