= Zareh Kalfayan =

Ottoman painter of Armenian descent

- Զարեհ Գալֆաեան
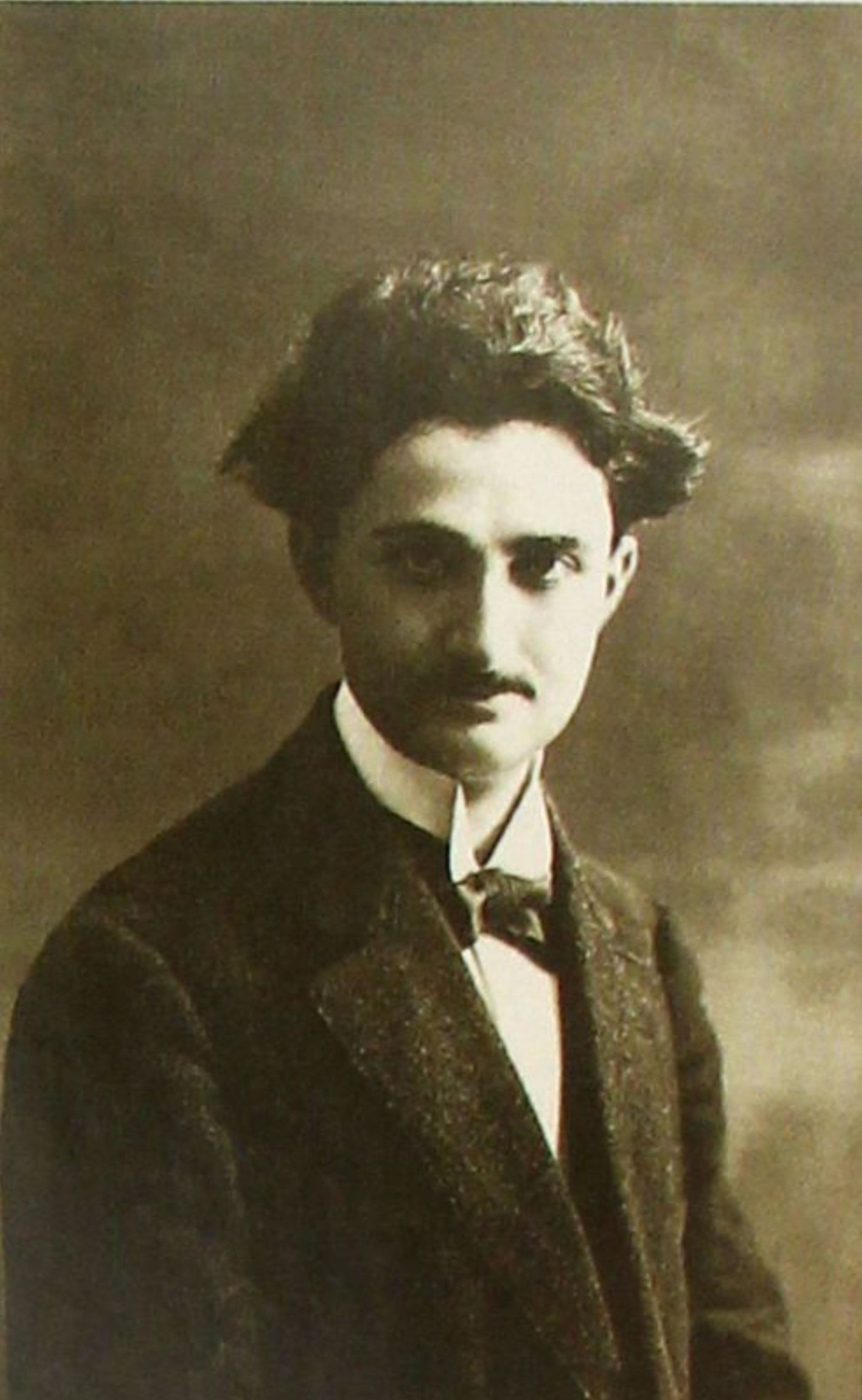
- Born: 1887; Constantinople, Constantinople vilayet, Ottoman Empire
- Died: 1939 (aged 51–52); Paris, French Third Republic

Zareh Kalfayan (Armenian: Զարեհ Գալֆաեան; 1887 – 1939) was an Ottoman painter of Armenian descent.

== Life ==
Zareh Kalfayan was born in Constantinople to Armenian parents. He attended the local art school. He began to teach art at the Getronagan Armenian Lyceum. His paintings were first exhibited in Istanbul. His notable works include Evening at Dolmabahce, Misty Morning at Tophane, and Sunrise and Rumelihisari.
