= Surp Harutyun =

Surp Harutyun (Armenian: Սուրբ Հարություն, Western Armenian: Սուրբ Յարութիւն, 'Holy Resurrection') may refer to:

- Taksim Surp Harutyun Church, an Armenian Church in Istanbul, Turkey
- Sourp Haroutiun Chapel, Nicosia, Cyprus
- The church of Surp Harutyun, Kecharis Monastery, Armenia
- Church of the Holy Resurrection, an Armenian church in Moscow, Russia
- Church of the Holy Resurrection, an Armenian church in Saint Petersburg, Russia
- Church of the Holy Resurrection, an Armenian church in Rostov-on-Don, Russia

== See also ==
- Church of the Holy Sepulchre, Jerusalem
