= Harut =

Harut may refer to:

- A variant of Harutyun, a given Armenian name. Also written Harout
- Harut and Marut, one of two angels mentioned in the second Surah of the Qur'an.
- Harut River (or Ardaskan River), a river of Afghanistan
  - Adraskan (or Harut), a town in western Afghanistan
