= Nigoghos Sarafian =

Armenian author and journalist

- Նիկողոս Սարաֆեան
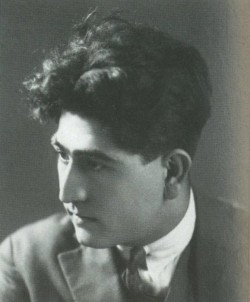
- Sarafian in 1926
- Born: April 14, 1902; Varna, Principality of Bulgaria
- Died: December 16, 1972 (aged 70); Paris, France
- Occupations: writer, poet, editor, and journalist

Nigoghos Sarafian (Armenian: Նիկողոս Սարաֆեան, April 14, 1902 in Varna, Principality of Bulgaria - December 16, 1972 in Paris, France), was an Armenian writer, poet, editor, and journalist.

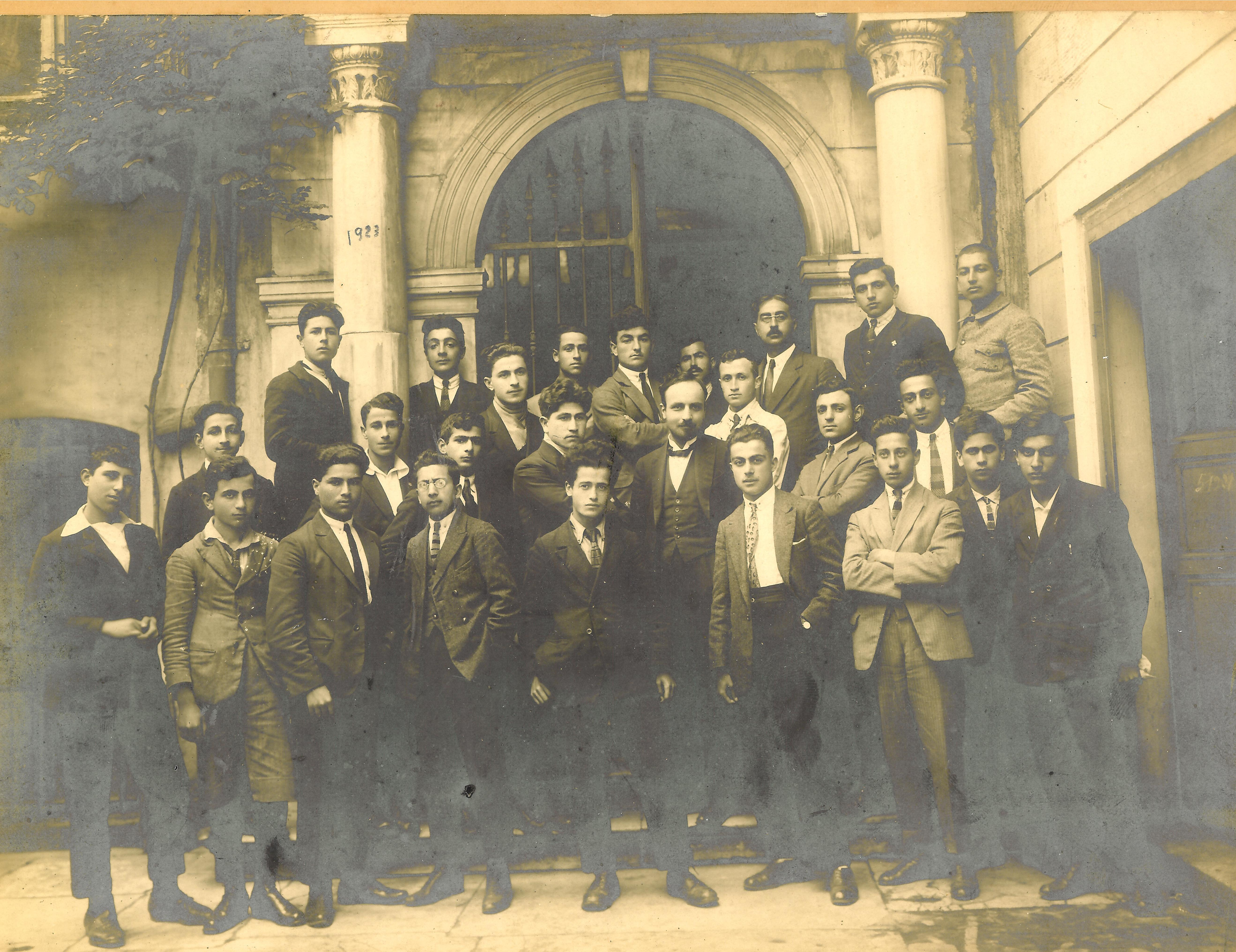
Class of 1923 Getronagan (Nigoghos Sarafian is in the middle and to the right of the principal)

== Biography ==
Nigoghos Sarafian was born on a boat that was leaving Constantinople on the way to Varna. He received his education in Armenian and French schools in Romania and Bulgaria. During the troublesome period of World War I, Sarafian along with his family fled back to Varna following the Armenian genocide where they would remain until the Armistice of Mudros and move to Istanbul. He attended the prestigious Getronagan Armenian High School. After the promulgation of the Turkish Republic in 1923 he moved to Paris. He wrote prolifically in French and Armenian.

== Bibliography ==
- The Conquest of a Space, Paris, 1928
- 14, Paris, 1933
- Ebb and Flow, Paris, 1939
- The Princess (novel), Paris, 1934, 108 pages
- Citadel (1940–1946), Paris, 1946, 198 pages
- Mediterranean, Beirut, 1971, 39 pages
- The Pain of Light, Paris-Antelias, 2000, 191 pages
- The Bois de Vincennes, 2011
