= Harutiun Alpiar =

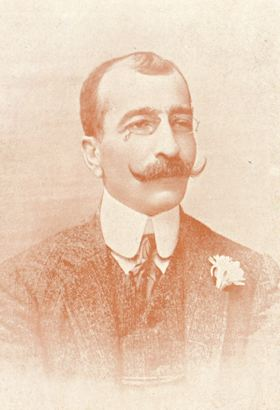
- Born: July 12, 1864; Smyrna, Ottoman Empire
- Died: April 5, 1919
- Occupation: Journalist

Harutiun Alpiar (Armenian: Յարութիւն Ալբիար; July 12, 1864 in Smyrna, Ottoman Empire - April 5, 1919) was an Ottoman Armenian journalist and humorous writer.

He used the pseudonyms Chrysanthemum and Radames. He received his education in Constantinople. He lived in Italy, France, and Egypt, where he edited the magazine Paros. He has written satirical novels and was the author of "Fantazio"(1913) which was a collection of his works. A large part of his work is still scattered in magazines.
