= Church of the Resurrection, Rostov-on-Don =

Church in Rostov Oblast, Russia

Church of the Resurrection
- Церковь Сурб Арутюн (Սբ Հարություն եկեղեցի)
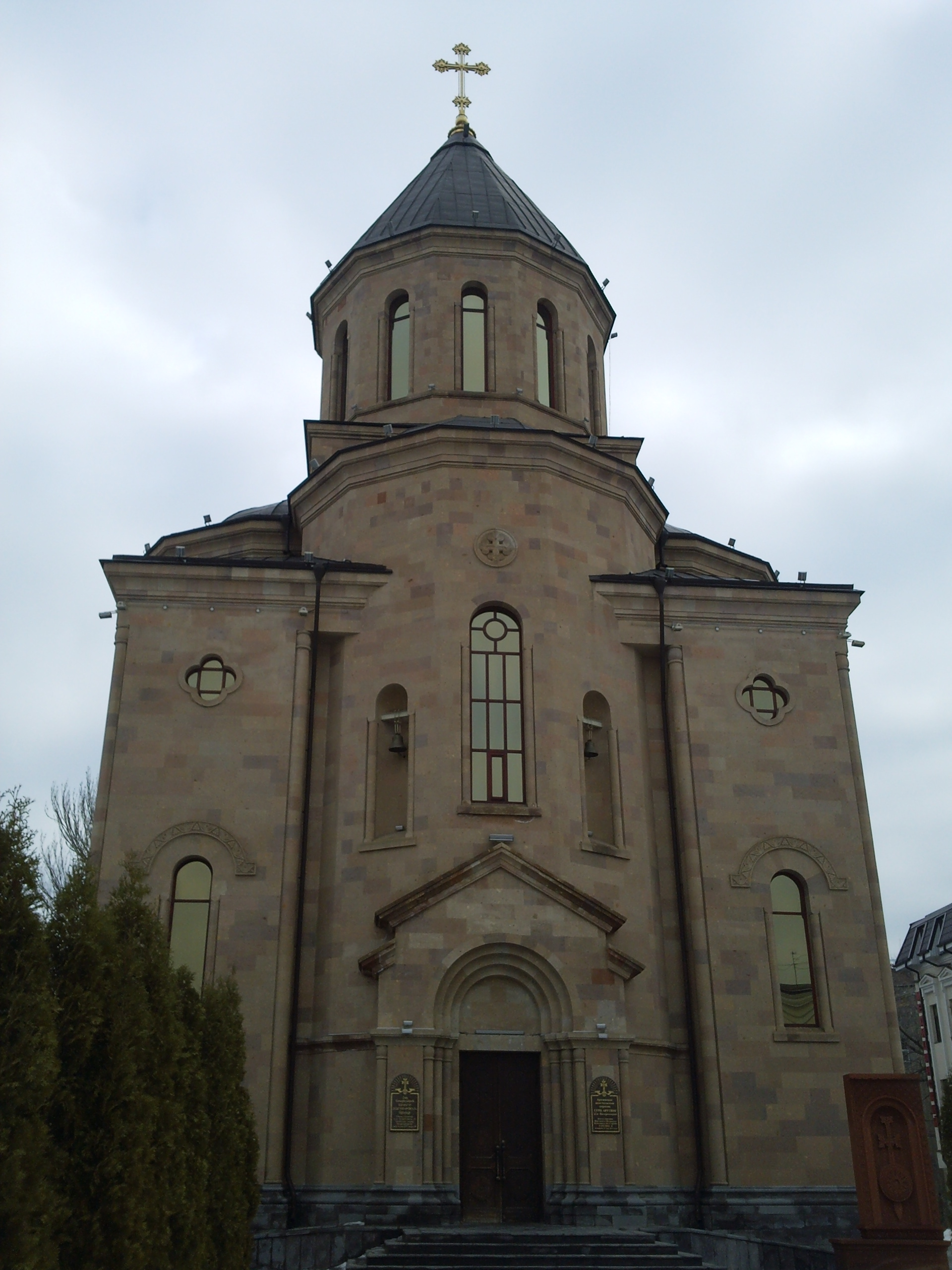
- Church of the Resurrection
- Location: Rostov-on-Don, Rostov Oblast, Russia
- Country: Russia
- Denomination: Armenian Apostolic Church

History
- Status: Parish church
- Dedication: Resurrection of Jesus

Architecture
- Completed: 2011

The Church of the Resurrection (Russian: Церковь Святого Воскресения, Armenian: Հայ Առաքելական Եկեղեցի) is an Armenian Apostolic church in the city of Rostov-on-Don, Russia.

== Description ==
According to 2010 census data, Rostov-on-Don has a population of 41 550 Armenians, which is 3.4% of total city's population.

The construction of the Church of the Resurrection began in October 2005. In 2011 it was finished and the church was consecrated on May 29, 2011.

The church was built in the traditions of Armenian religious architecture. Its total height with the dome is about 40 meters. The building can accommodate about 300 parishioners. Walls inside and outside were stuffed with pink tuff which was specially brought from Armenia.

In front of the church there are two khachkar stones on both sides of the front door. Khachkars were made of pink tuff and were installed in honor of friendship between Russian and Armenian peoples.
