= Mary Lord (painter) =

Mary Lord (born 1931) is a landscape painter in oil and watercolours. Leeds Art Gallery holds six of her works in its permanent collection.

== Biography ==
Lord was born in Birstall, West Yorkshire in 1931, studying at Dewsbury and Batley College of Art before attending Leeds College of Art (1950-1953) where she was taught by Richard Mcdonald and Tom Watts. Lord continues her art practice in Birstall where she has a studio.

=== Painting style ===
The changing seasons, times of day navigate her expressionist style of the Yorkshire landscapes she depicts.

'All these paintings were inspired by my deep feelings for the landscape of the North of England, especially West Yorkshire and the Yorkshire Dales, which I have known all my life'.

Lords artworks tend to focus on the months, weather or view points with such titles such as; 'March Valley', 'Summer Morning', 'Excitement of the first snow' and 'Misty Morning'. Oils and watercolours on paper or card in varying size, usually between 21x20cm (8x8) to 141x80cm (56x31) incorporate her deep brushstrokes in vivid colours or muted tones depending on the ambient scenery, stating 'that few of my landscapes are specific views but are personal interpretations of a particular stretch of countryside.

=== Exhibitions ===
Exhibiting since her first show at Batley Art Gallery in 1957, Lord has shown at Bretton Hall, Leighton House London, Wakefield Art Gallery and Leeds Art Gallery in 2001 amongst many others.

=== Collections ===
Much of her work is publicly or privately owned. Many universities and art galleries have her work within their collection including University of Manchester and The Hepworth, with Leeds Art Gallery housing six within their collection including; 'Morning in Leeds from the Hilton Hotel', Sunset', 'Island in the sun', 'Summer Dawn', The Valley' and 'Winter Sunrise'.
