= Tigran Harutyunyan =

Armenian chess grandmaster (born 1997)

Tigran K. Harutyunyan
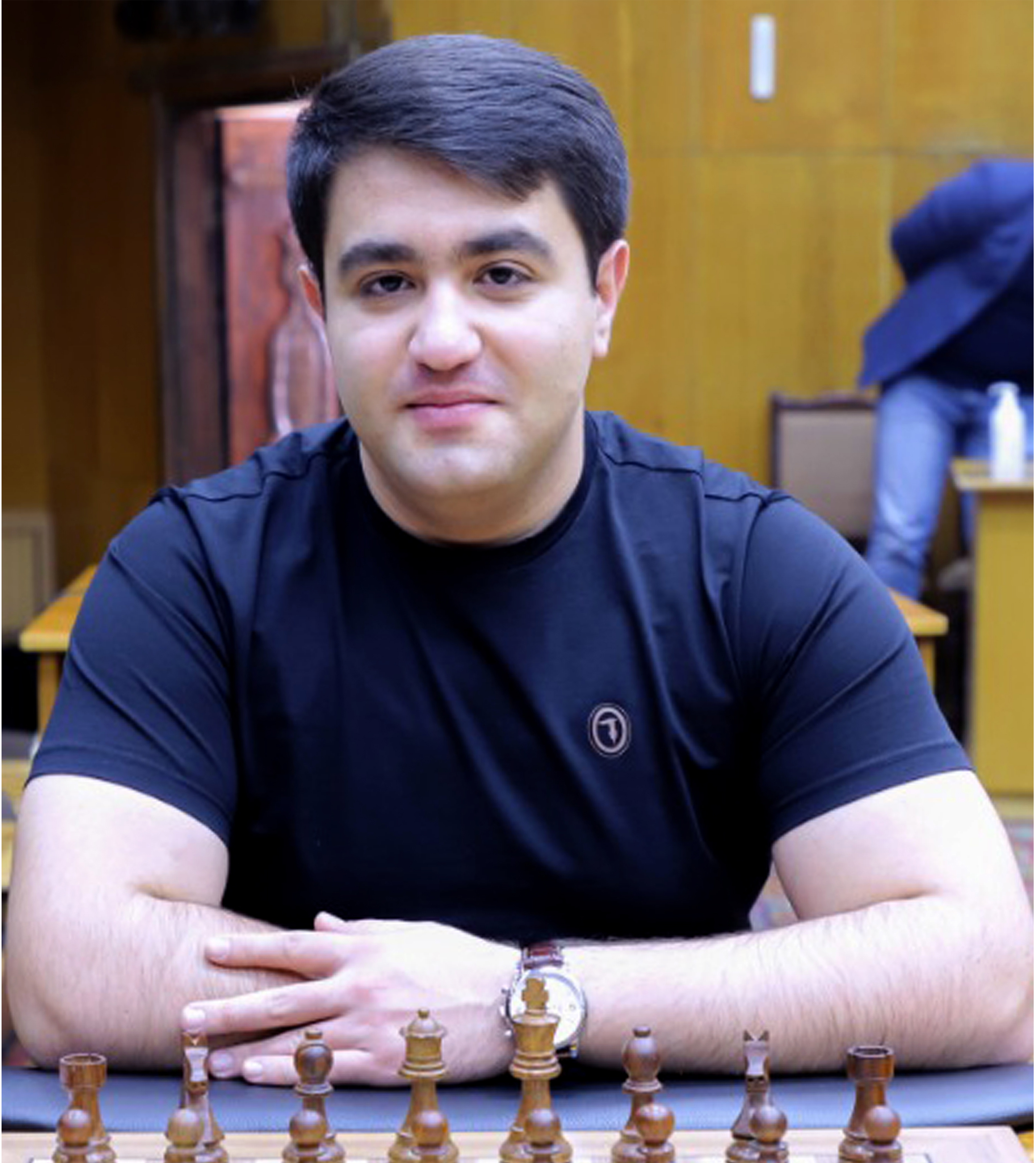

Personal information
- Born: 15 January 1997 (age 29) Yerevan, Armenia

Chess career
- Country: Armenia
- Title: Grandmaster (2019)
- FIDE rating: 2505 (July 2026)
- Peak rating: 2573 (September 2021)

Tigran K. Harutyunyan (Armenian: Տիգրան Հարությունյան; born January 15, 1997) is an Armenian chess player. He was awarded the Grandmaster title by FIDE in March 2019.

== Chess career ==
Harutyunyan earned his FIDE master title in 2012, followed by the international master title in 2014. He earned his third grandmaster norm in March 2019, becoming the 43rd GM from Armenia.

== Achievements ==
- Eight time Armenian Youth champion (at 2006, 2008, 2009, 2010, 2011, 2012, 2013, 2015)
- 2011: Vice-champion of the World Youth U16 Chess Olympiad
- 2012: 4th in European Youth U16 Chess Championships
- 2012:4th in World U16 Chess Championships.
- 2013: 5th prize holder of the European Youth U16 Chess Championship
- 2014: 5th place in the European Youth U18 Chess Championship
- 2014: 6th place in the World Youth U18 Chess Championships
- 2014: Bronze medalist of Karen Asrian Memorial International Chess Tournament
- 2014: Winner of the World's Youth Stars International Chess Tournament
- 2015: Winner of the Nona Gaprindashvili Cup
- 2016: Winner of the Georgian Club Championship
- 2017: Winner of the ALAIN Juniors Championship
- 2018: Vice-champion of the 40 R.G.Nezhmetdinov Memorial
- 2019: Vice-champion of the Aeroflot open B
- 2019: Winner of the 10eme LUC Open - Tournoi International d'echecs de Lille.
- 2019: Third place in XLII Open Int Escacs Barbera del Valles 2019 Grup A.
- 2019: Vice-champion of the XXI Obert Internacional Sant Marti 2019 Grup A
- 2019: Winner of the Nona Gaprindashvili Cup (Open A) 2019
- 2019: Vice-champion of the in Almaty Open 2019 A
- 2019: Winner of the European Universities Chess Championship
- 2020: Third place in XXXI International Chess Open Roquetas de Mar
- 2020: Winner of the Aeroflot Open 2020 B
