= Kegham Kavafyan =

Ottoman Armenian architect

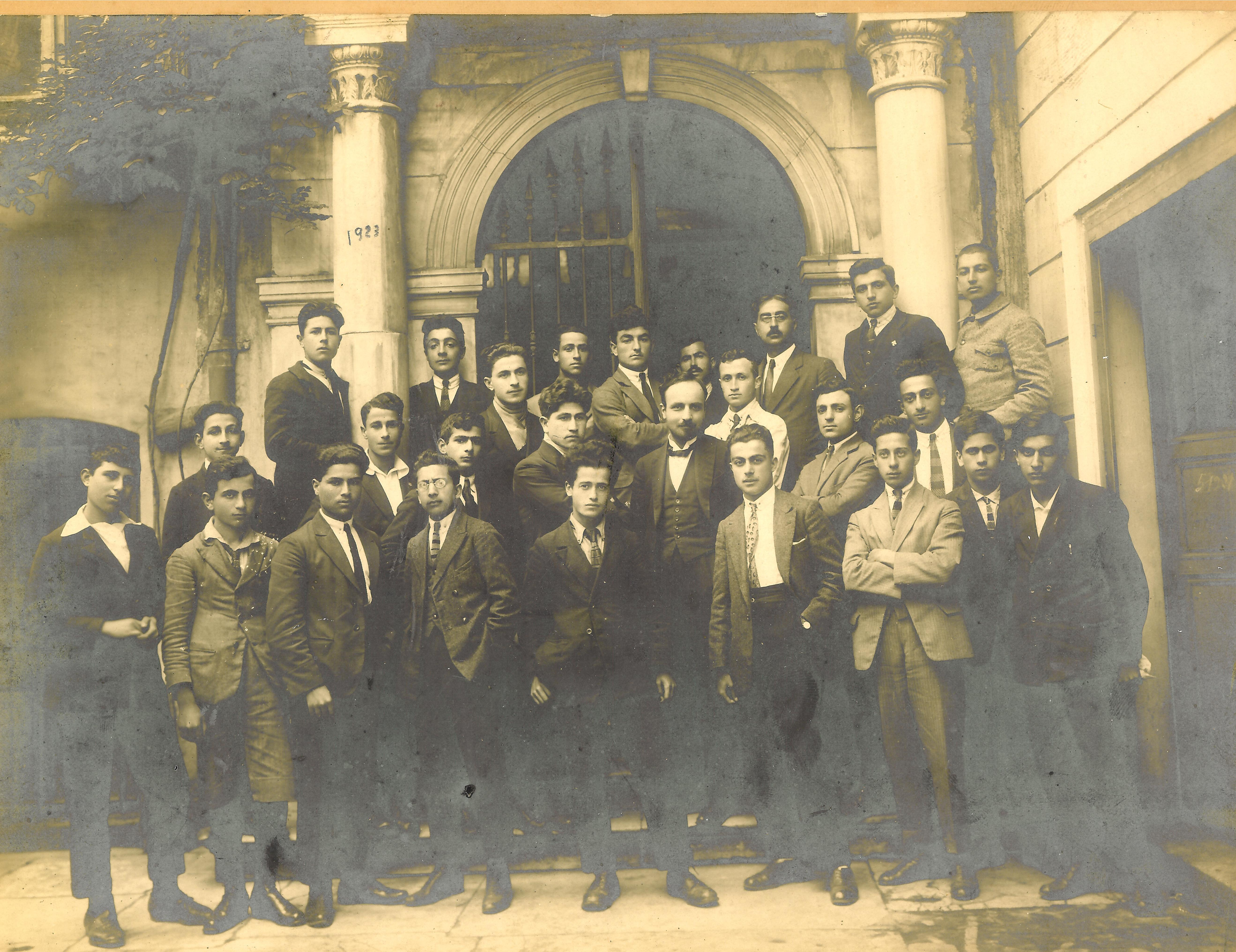
Kavafyan as the principal of Getronagan High School (center) in 1923

Kegham Kavafyan (Գեղամ Գաւաֆեան, born 1888 Constantinople, Ottoman Turkey – November 30, 1959 Switzerland) was an Ottoman Armenian architect. He is noted for his construction plans for the Süreyya Opera House in the Kadıköy district of Istanbul, Turkey.

== Biography ==
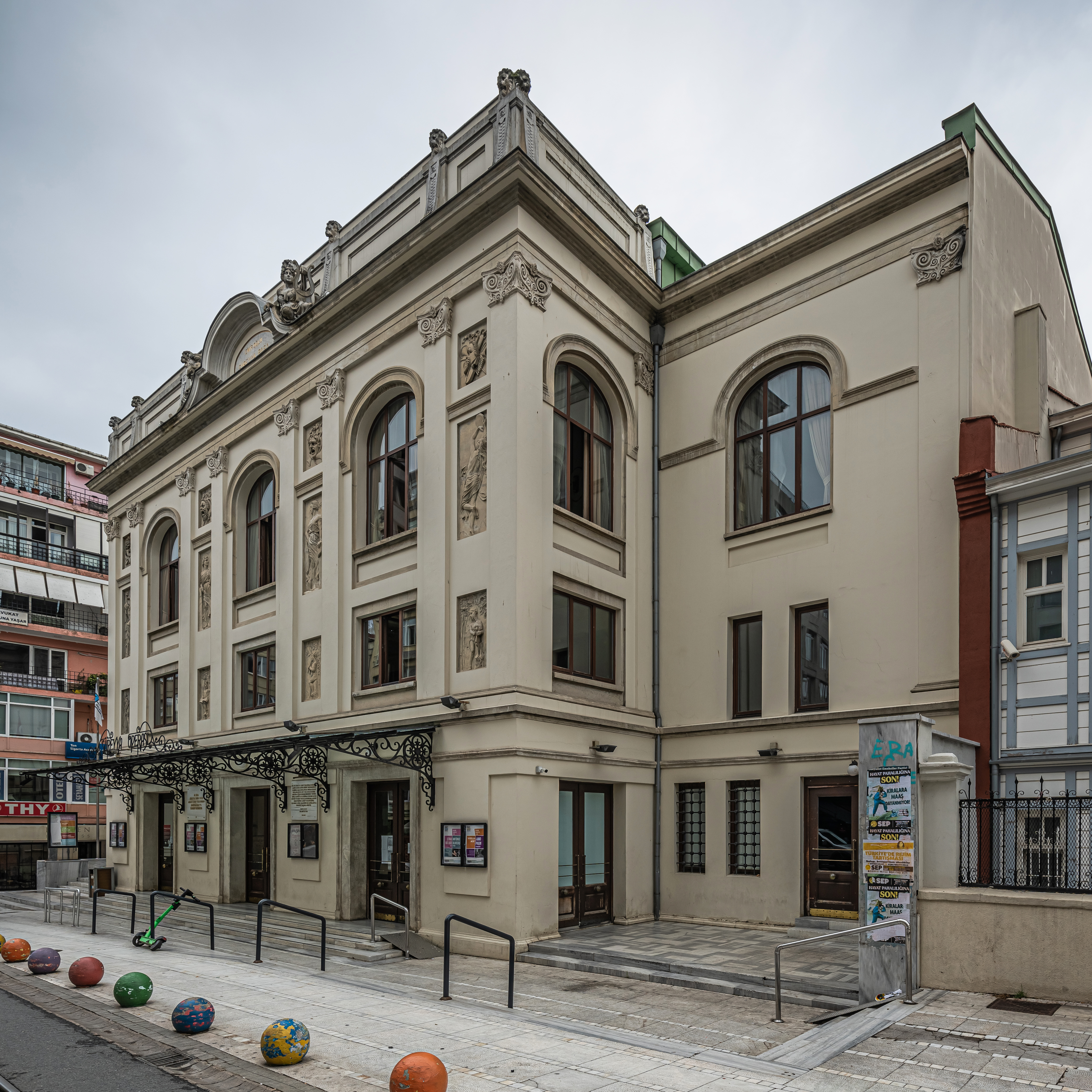
Süreyya Opera House in Kadıköy, Istanbul, designed by Kavafyan.

Kavafyan was born in Constantinople to Armenian parents. He received his primary education at the Armenian Surp Haç Tbrevank School in Üsküdar. He continued his education at the prestigious Berberian Academy. In 1910 he graduated from the École Nationale des Ponts et Chaussées, a Civil Engineering School in Paris. After returning to Istanbul, he began designing and renovating many buildings in the city. By the order of Deputy of Istanbul Süreyya İlmen, Kegham Kavafyan was appointed the architect to the Süreyya Opera House which was completed in 1927. The opera house was known to be the first musical theatre on the Asian side of Istanbul. He also renovated the Mhitaryan Armenian School in the Pangaltı district of Istanbul in 1917. He became the principal of the Getronagan Armenian High School from 1917 to 1927. Kavafyan died in Switzerland during therapy at the age of 71.
