= Arsen Harutyunyan =

Arsen Harutyunyan may refer to:

- Arsen Harutyunyan (alpine skier)
- Arsen Harutyunyan (wrestler)
