= Zhora Harutyunyan =

Armenian screenwriter and playwright

- Born: September 7, 1928; Yerevan, Armenian Soviet Socialist Republic
- Died: January 10, 2002 (aged 73); Yerevan, Armenia
- Occupations: Writer, playwright, theater director

Zhora "Gevorg" Saghateli Harutyunyan (Armenian: Ժորա "Գևորգ" Սաղաթելի Հարությունյան; September 7, 1928 in Yerevan – January 10, 2002 in Yerevan) was an Armenian writer, playwright and theater director. He was awarded the Renowned activist of arts of Armenia-title, the State Prize of Armenia, "Gabriel Sundukian" and "Artavazd" Prizes. Vardan Ajemian was his first supporter as a theater activist.

Harutyunyan authored many comedies and plays, which were staged in Armenia and abroad. He headed the Playwright's Union of Armenia. He directed the Armenian branch of the USSR Literary Fund. He was a member of Writers Union of Armenia committee.

== Early life ==
In 1946, he graduated from Yerevan Medical College. In 1962 he finished studying at the Yerevan Medical Institute.

From 1950 to 1965 he worked at different medical institutions of Yerevan. In 1964 was appointed Chief Doctor at USSR Literary Fund Armenian Branch Polyclinics. In 1965 he was appointed USSR Literary Fund Armenian Branch Director. He was on this position up to 1965. Zhora Harutyunyan was also Writers Union of Armenia committee member.

== Works ==
Zhora Harutyunyan is the author of many plays:Patient #199,In the world of flowers,Heart Disease,Ghazar goes to War,Fortunate People,Crossroad,Your Final Destination,It was Sunny June,In Our Age and many others. His plays have been stages in different countries of former USSR and Europe, such as South Caucasus, Central Asia, Russia, Hungary and Bulgaria. In autumn of 2008 on the occasion of his 80th anniversary of birth Zhora Harutyunyan's last playMr. Shmo and Friends (the scenic title wasWho are they?) was staged by the People's Artist Yervand Ghazanchyan at the Musical Comedy Theater after H. Paronyan.

A number of researches are devoted to Zhora Harutyunyan's life and activities. One of them is The Knight of the Humor (Yerevan, 1999); written by NAS RA Academician Sevak Arzumanyan, as well as outstanding playwright Zhirayr Ananyan's analytical workGevorg Harutyunyan (Yerevan, 1981) and Candidate of Literary Criticism Vachagan Grigoryan'sDramaturgy of Gevorg Harutyunyan (Yerevan, 2006). In 2003, on the occasion of Zhora Harutyunyan's 75th anniversary of birth the compilation of Zhora Harutyunyan's previously unreleased works was published by his daughter Gayane Harutyunyan.

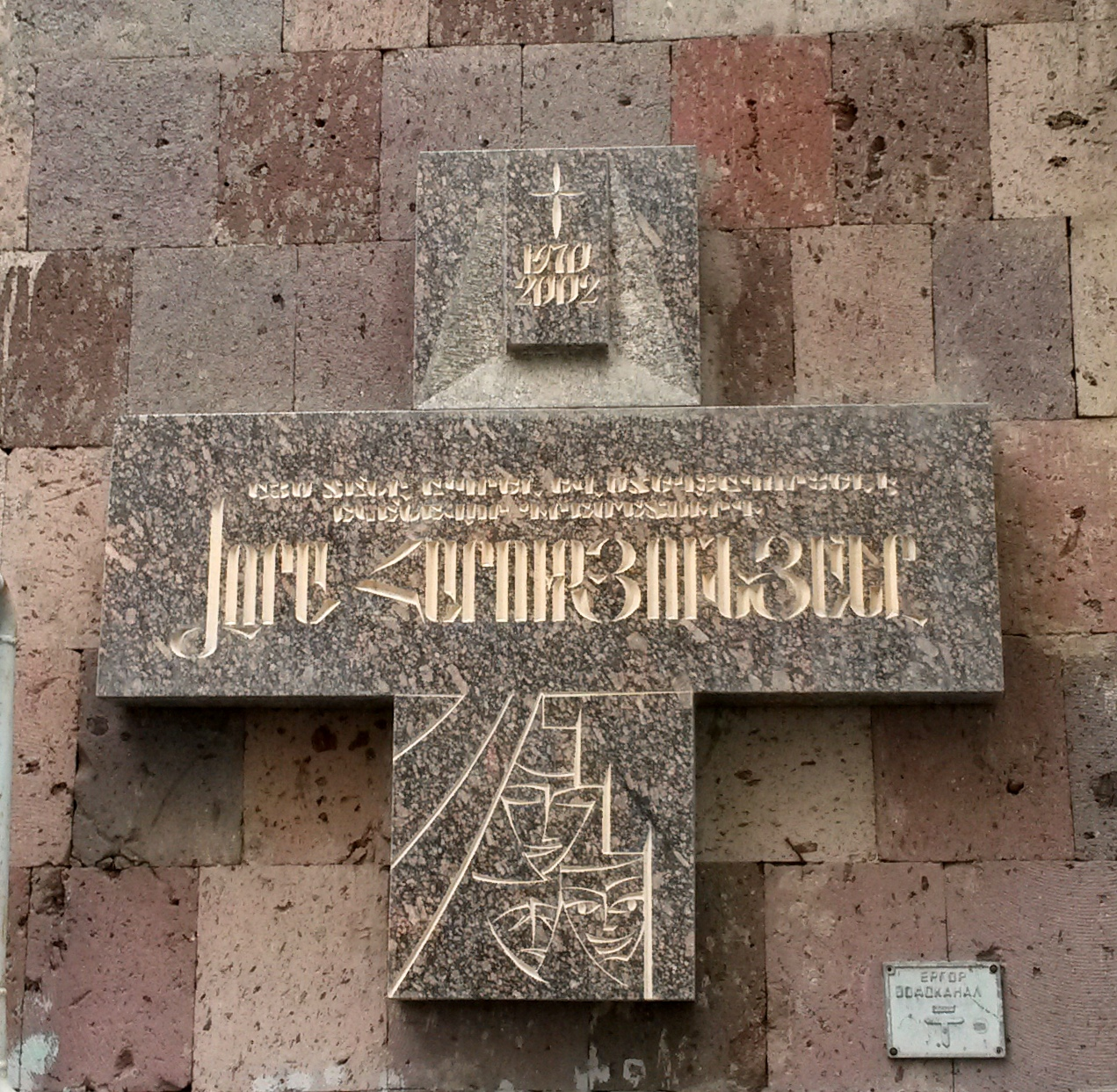

In 2005, Gayane Harutyunyan initiated the publication of another commemorative anthologyYou came, surprised Us All and Leaved Us.

== Filmography ==
- Khachmeruki deghatune (1988) (At the Crossroad Drugstore)
- Hrdeh (1984) (The Fire)
- Khoshor shahum (1981) (The Big Win)
- Harsnatsun hyusisits (1975) (TV) (A Bride from the North)
- Dzakhord Panose (1969) (TV) (Panos the Clumsy)
- Voske tslik (1955) (Golden Bull Calf),
- Shrtnerk #4 (Leap-stick #4 ),
- Hushardzan (1972) (The Monument),
- Ghazare gnum e paterazm (Ghazar Goes to War) and others.
