= Dennis Choi =

American neurologist and academic

Dennis W. Choi is an American neurologist who was on the faculty of Stanford University in the 1980s, and served as the Jones Professor and Head of Neurology at Washington University in St. Louis during the 1990s, leaving in January 2001 to work in industry (Merck). While a faculty member at Washington University School of Medicine, Choi was a key contributor to research on glutamate-mediated toxicity ("excitotoxicity") as a mechanism of neural injury in stroke and traumatic brain injury.

Choi attended Harvard College, from which he graduated in 1974, and went on to Harvard Medical School and the Harvard-MIT Division of Health Sciences and Technology to receive an MD and a PhD in Pharmacology in 1978. As a graduate student he demonstrated that benzodiazepines augments GABA-A receptor function, which represents a seminal discovery in neuroscience. Choi also completed his residency and fellowship in Neurology at Harvard.

Choi joined Emory University School of Medicine in 2007, where he served as the Director of the Comprehensive Neurosciences Center and the Neuroscience, Human Nature, and Society Initiative. He was also a professor in the departments of neurology, pharmacology, and pediatrics. In the Spring of 2009, Choi taught an undergraduate course entitled "Neurofunction and Artificial Intelligence" for the Emory University Neuroscience & Behavioral Biology Program.

Choi is currently the chair of the Department of Neurology at Renaissance School of Medicine at Stony Brook University as well as Director of the Neurosciences Institute. He sits on the scientific advisory boards of several companies and foundations, including the Cure Alzheimer's Fund.
