= Yacoub Artin =

Armenian educator and scholar

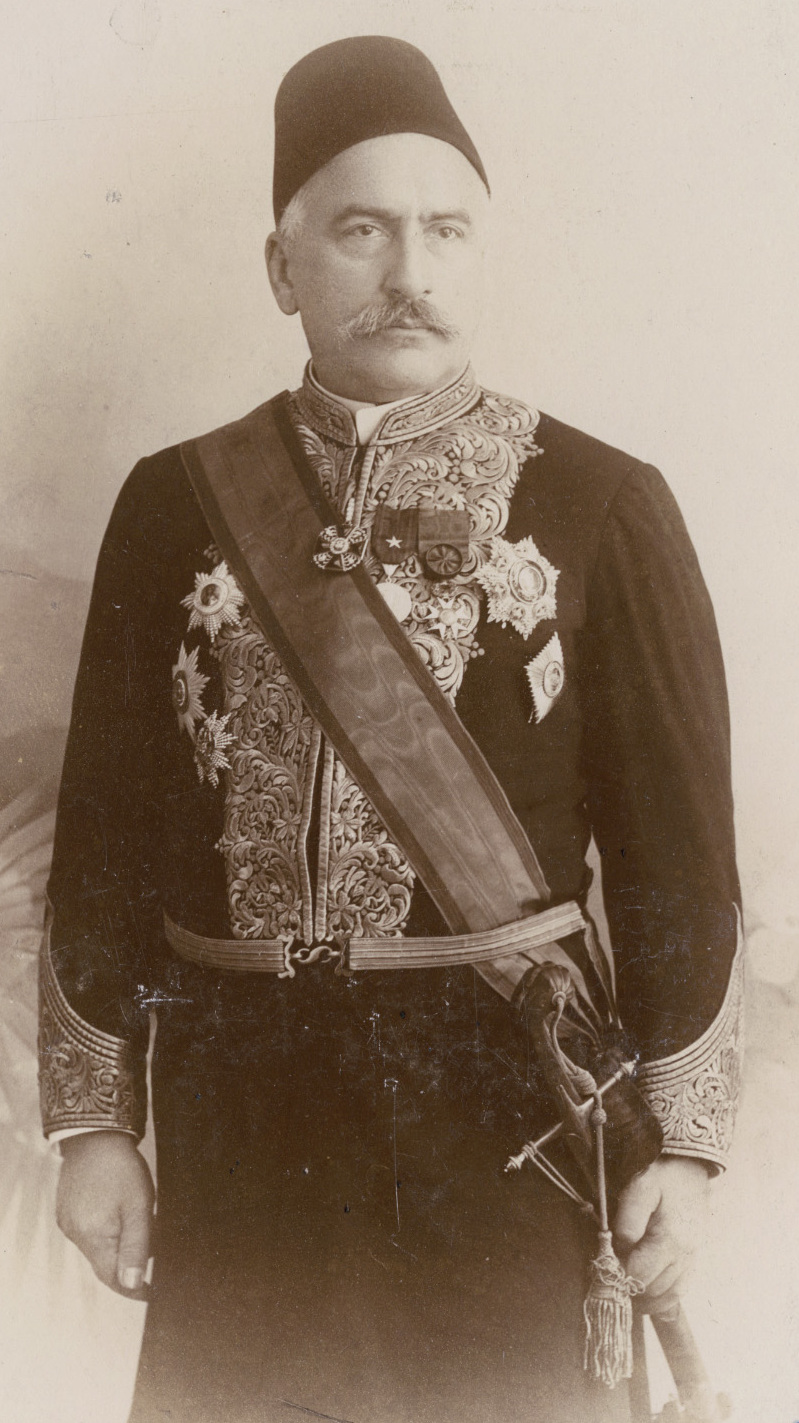

Yacoub Artin (15 April 1842 – 21 January 1919) was an Egyptian educator and scholar from ethnic Armenian origin.

He was of Armenian descent, working for the Ministry of Public Education in 1888. It was noted in a period newspaper that he was one of many "non-Muslim" Egyptians working for the government at the time, a source of irritation among a segment of the population. He was an Armenian Apostolic Christian, and once more in 1895 it was noted that a "non-Muslim" was in charge of education for a population that was predominately Muslim.

== Works ==
- La proprieté foncière en Égypte, Cairo, 1883. Translated by Edward Abbott van Dyck as The right of landed property in Egypt, London, 1885.
- L'instruction publique en Egypte, Paris, 1890.
- (tr.) Contes populaires inédits de la vallée du Nil, Paris, 1895.
- Contribution à l'étude du blason en Orient, London, 1902.
- England in the Sudan, London: Macmillan, 1911. Translated from French by George Robb.
