= Wendy Artin =

American painter

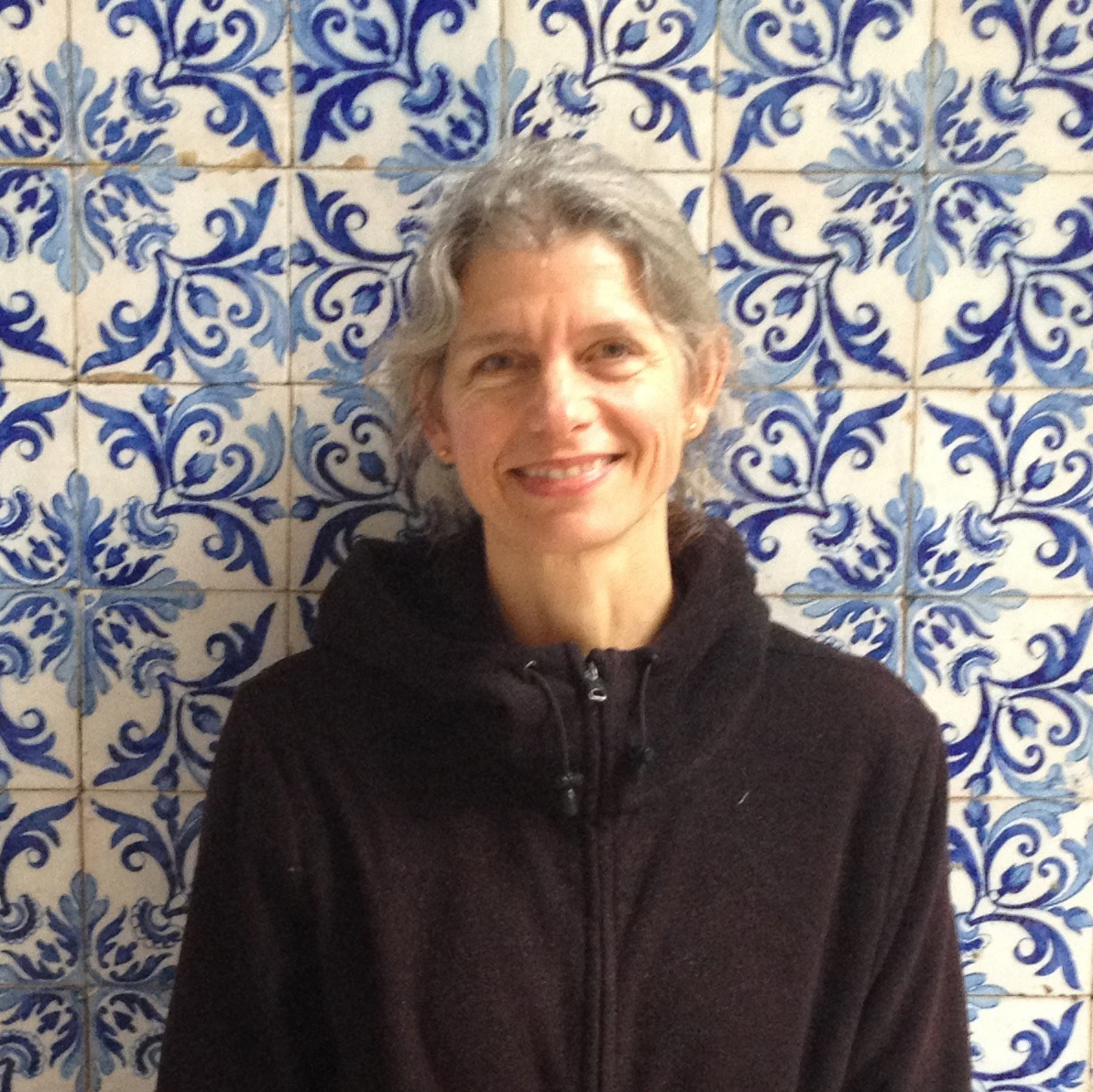
- Artin in Portugal, 2015
- Born: Boston, Massachusetts, U.S.
- Education: University of Pennsylvania, School of the Museum of Fine Arts, Boston
- Known for: Painting
- Style: Watercolor, charcoal

Wendy Artin is an American painter. She primarily works in watercolor and charcoal. Her work is figurative and classical and explores the timeless interaction of light with surfaces on architecture and the human body.

Artin grew up in Newton, Massachusetts, where she climbed trees, walked on her hands, rode a unicycle, and drew constantly. As a child and young adult she spent a great deal of time traveling and living abroad, sketching in streets, cafés, museums. She met her husband, Bruno Boschin, when her travels took her to Italy and into his bookstore, the Libreria del Viaggiatore (The Bookshop of the Traveller), in Rome.

On March 7, 2023, The Institute of Classical Architecture & Art (ICAA) announced that Artin was the 2023 winner of the Arthur Ross Award for Excellence in the Classical Tradition in FINE ARTS.

== Artwork ==
FIGURES:

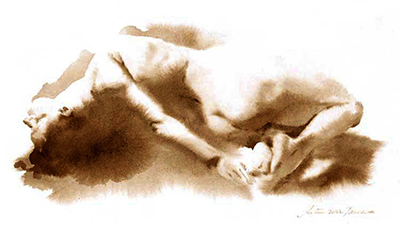
Wendy Artin, Tamara Touching Toes, 2002

Artin is best known for loose expressive sanguine watercolors of the live model, through which she explores absence, beauty and the corporeal. As poet Jessica Fisher writes in the catalogue of the exhibition Roman Studio: “The viewer is drawn into the process of making as she or he chooses where to read form, where negative space; our desire completes the dance begun by the brush and its liquid medium.”

STATUES:

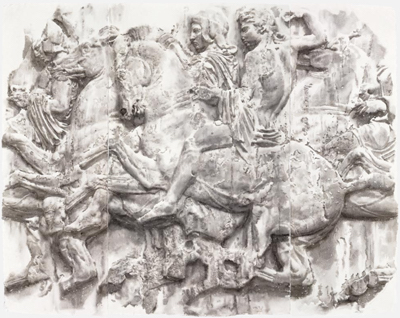
Wendy Artin, Parthenon Frieze, Phrygian Cap, 2010

Much of Artin's artwork is based on statues. Artin’s large monochromatic watercolors of the Parthenon frieze have been displayed in Rome, in Boston, and in the 2015 exhibit "Rocks, Paper, Memory: Wendy Artin's Watercolor Paintings of Ancient Sculpture", at the Kelsey Museum of Archaeology in Michigan, curated by Christopher Ratté.

Poet Karl Kirchwey was inspired by one of Artin’s Parthenon paintings, Phrygian Cap, to write an ekphrastic poem, North Frieze Block XLIII, Figures 118-20.

In 2012 upon the recommendation of artist Eric Fischl, Artin was invited to create a series of watercolor paintings from Greek and Roman statues of mythological figures to accompany Seamus Heaney's classically themed poems in the book Stone from Delphi, by Arion Press.

ROME:

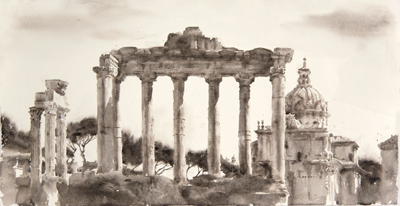
Wendy Artin, Temple of Saturn with Pines, 2018

The Mediterranean light on the iconic ruins and parasol pines of Rome are a recurring theme in Artin’s painting. Architectural historian Adele Chatfield-Taylor writes, “Being in Rome slows us all down, turns us all into painters… Wendy takes the same views that attract us all--the umbrella pine, the solitary column, the river god--and turns them into images we recognize but feel we have never really seen before. They are familiar but alive, fresh, and inevitable.”

These paintings are nostalgic and often calligraphic, as writes Alexander Purves, “This inert marble is so filled with light, with life, with memory, that we are made to forget that, in the end, these are just stains on a piece of paper made by the strokes of a brush.”

WALLS:

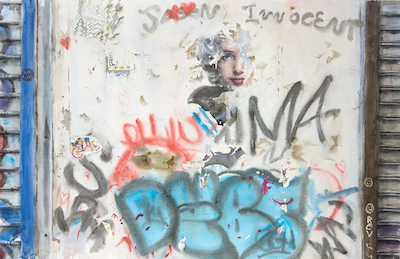
Wendy Artin, Marilyn Wall New York City, 2017

During the years prior to settling in Rome, throughout the late 1980s and early 90s, Artin traveled and painted many views of city walls and vehicles. These colorful paintings showed her skill and the versatility of watercolor, recreating rusty stains and graffiti, depicting photographic posters and washy walls. Her exhibition in Boston entitled “Here Today” is a tribute to the random beauty of self-expression and urban grit around the world.

STILL LIFES:

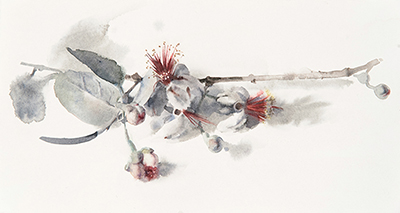
Wendy Artin, Pineapple Guava branch, 2020

Artin is also an appreciator of food and plants, the subject matter of her 2020 exhibition Lush: Flora e Fauna dalla Quarantena. As organic farmer of Orto Vulcanico La Lupa Jonathan Nossiter writes, “What is animate?”, Wendy Artin seems to ask us. What is solid matter and what is liquid? If an inanimate sculpture can be turned to vibrant flesh by her hand why can’t organic matter, in its turn, acquire the mineral dimension of sculpture?

== Formation ==
Artin's first important teacher was artist Jean Patiky, a young art teacher at Hyde School in Newton Highlands, then called Jeannie Kornblue. Jeannie had the first graders drawing and painting from life, from imagination, even carving linoleum blocks. When Artin brought home a careful magic marker contour drawing she had made of her sneaker, her parents thought it was the work of Miss Kornblue.

During her five years at the School of the Museum of Fine Arts in Boston, Artin drew in the life drawing studios of Miroslav Antic, Lou Gippetti, Henry Schwartz, Andy Serbick, Tim Nichols, Bill Flynn.

For two years at the École Nationale Supérieure des Beaux-Arts, Artin was in the drawing atelier of Férit Iscan.

Artin has a BA in French Literature and Fine Arts from the University of Pennsylvania (magna cum laude) and an MFA in Painting from the School of the Museum of Fine Arts, Boston, and Tufts University. She studied for two years at the École Nationale Supérieure des Beaux-Arts in Paris, France. Wendy Artin is an Artistic Advisor and has been a Visiting Artist at the American Academy in Rome.

She is the daughter of mathematician Michael Artin, granddaughter of mathematicians Emil Artin and Natascha Artin Brunswick.

== Exhibitions ==
Wendy Artin exhibits with Gurari Collections in Boston, Massachusetts, USA, and at the Galerie du Passage in Paris, France.

Artin has works in several public and private collections, including the Museum of Fine Arts, Boston, the Kelsey Museum of Archaeology.

62 artworks by Artin are in the Prints and Drawings Collection of the Boston Public Library.

42 artworks by Artin were exhibited at the St Gauden’s Memorial in 2003.

In 2015, the Kelsey Museum of Archaeology showed 47 works in "Rocks, Paper, Memory: Wendy Artin's Watercolor Paintings of Ancient Sculpture", curated by Christopher Ratté.

In 2013, the American Academy in Rome exhibited 35 of Wendy Artin’s watercolors in celebration of Nobel laureate Seamus Heaney and the Arion Press book, Stone From Delphi.

== Bibliography of 19 Exhibition Catalogues ==
Flowers Friezes & Frescoes, 2024, with introduction by Pat Nicholson, Gurari Collections, Boston

Livia's Garden, Frescoes and Figures, 2023, with introduction by Virginia Jewiss, Gurari Collections, Boston

Flesh and Stone, 2022, with writing by Ingrid D. Rowland, Gurari Collections, Boston

Flow, 2021, with poem by Francis Morrissey, Gurari Collections, Boston

Lush: Flora e Fauna dalla Quarantena, 2020, with writings by Michael Frank and Jonathan Nossiter, Gurari Collections, Boston

Révèle, 2019, with introduction by Pat Nicholson, and writing by Andre Aciman, Gurari Collections, Boston

Ad Libitum, 2018, with introductions by Elizabeth McGowan, and Guy Hedreen, Gurari Collections, Boston

Here Today, 2017, with text by Joshua David, and ekphrastic prose by Susanna Mattiangeli, Gurari Collections, Boston

From the Roman Studio, 2015, catalogue with preface, Being in Time, by Jessica Fisher, Gurari Collections, Boston

Rocks, Paper, Memory: Wendy Artin's Watercolor Paintings of Ancient Sculptures, 2015, catalogue with discussion between curator Christopher Ratté and Wendy Artin, Kelsey Museum, Michigan

Parthenon Frieze, 2011, with text by Alexander Purves, and sonnet by Karl Kirchwey, Gurari Collections, Boston

Hadrien, 2009, with text by Alexander Purves, Galerie du Passage

Esprit de Corps, 2007, with text by Amy Fine Collins, Gurari Collections, Boston

Toys, 2005, with text by Robert Capia, Galerie du Passage, Paris

Foro Italico, 2005, with text by Stephen Harby, Gurari Collections, Boston

Femmine, 2003, with texts by Laura Riccioli and Tamara Bartolini, Gurari Collections, Boston

Roma Antica, 2002, Gurari Collections, Boston

Dessins et Aquarelles, 1994-2001, with texts by Pierre-Jean Remy, Eric Fischl and April Gornik Galerie du Passage, Paris

Figures, 2001, with texts by Eric Fischl and April Gornik, Gurari Collections, Boston

Aphrodite, 2000, texts by Adele Chatfield-Taylor, Richard Leacock and Valerie Lalonde, Gurari Collections, Boston
