= Artin Hindoğlu =

Artin Hindoğlu (Armenian: Յարութիւն Հինտօղլու) was a 19th-century Ottoman etymologist, interpreter, professor, linguist, and writer of the first modern French-Turkish dictionary.

== Life ==
Of Armenian descent, Artin Hindoğlu was born in Istanbul and lived there until 10 years old. His family were natives of Kütahya. He moved to Austria in 1812 and became a professor from 1824-1831. He was then appointed as interpreter for the Emperor of the Austrian Empire.

== Works ==
His first known publication was in Vienna in 1829, where he published an Ottoman Turkish grammar book for the comprehension of ordinary conversation. The work was later translated into French and published in 1834 under the title "Grammaire théorique et pratique de la langue turke telle qu'elle est parlée à Constantinople"(English: Theoretical and practical grammar of the Turkish language as spoken in Constantinople). In 1830, he wrote a German-Armenian dictionary and had it published in Venice at the Armenian Mekhitarist monastery at the San Lazzaro degli Armeni. In 1838, Artin Hindoğlu wrote the Dictionnaire Abrégé Français-Turc (English:French-Turkish Abridged Dictionary), a French-Turkish dictionary which became the first of its kind.
