= Mary Lord (correspondent) =

American journalist

Mary Lord (born c. 1954) was born in Boston and spent seven years as a correspondent in Newsweek magazine's Washington bureau, where she covered defense and foreign affairs. She became Far East bureau chief for U.S. News & World Report and returned to Washington as the business and financial editor. Lord has been a member of the DC State Board of Education since 2007 and has been endorsed by The Current. Her writings have been included in a number of local and national publications such as U.S. News & World Report, Essence Magazine, and The Boston Globe. She focuses most of her writing on science and engineering education. Lord is also an editor for the American Society for Engineering Education's Prism magazine and has had stints as a Pentagon correspondent.

== Personal ==
Lord is an active member in schools and in her community. She supports parent involvement, neighborhood schools with adequate libraries and labs, successful education in arts and sciences, bonds-on and service learning, enrichment programs, vocational training, internships, community partnerships, and common-sense rules.

== Education ==
She graduated with honors in East Asian Studies from Harvard University, where she studied Japanese language and modern history.

== DC State Board of Education ==
As a member of the DC State Board of Education, Lord has worked with colleagues on a variety of initiatives. She was associated with the first-ever District of Columbia's standards for health and physical education along with the new "common core" set of standards set for literacy and math. Lord, along with the state board, is also responsible for reviewing graduation requirements and recommendations from teachers, students, and the public. She represented Ward 2 on the DC State Board of Education.

== Organizations ==
Lord also serves on the board of directors for the National Association of the State Boards of Education and is a board member of the Dupont Circle Citizens Association.

== Family ==
Lord is married to her husband Woody Landay and together they have two children, Amelia and David. Landay is TV News editor for the Australian Broadcasting Company. Amelia, her oldest, attends the University of Vermont and is a middle school teacher. David goes to Woodrow Wilson SHS Academy of Science and Mathematics and Technology and studies engineering. The family resides in Longtime Dupont Circle/West End.
