= Harutyun Varpurciyan =

Turkish architect of Armenian origin

Harutyun Vapurciyan is a Turkish architect of Armenian origin.

One of his most important of the designs that he implemented alongside architects such as Greek architect Avyerinos Andonyadis, Armenian architect Nishan Yaubyan and Enis Kortan was the Sakarya Hukumet Konak (or Local Government building of Sakarya) which finished in 1956.
