= Hrand Nazariantz =

Hrand Nazariantz Հրանտ Նազարեանց
- Born: January 8, 1886; Üsküdar (Istanbul), Ottoman Empire
- Died: January 25, 1962 (aged 76); Bari, Italy
- Education: Sorbonne University, Paris
- Occupations: Journalist, poet, teacher
- Years active: First half of 20th century
- Notable credit: Candidate to Nobel Prize
- Spouse(s): Maddalena de Cosmis (m.1913-1954), Maria Lucarelli (m.1954-1962)

Hrand Nazariantz (Հրանտ Նազարեանց; January 8, 1886 – January 25, 1962) was an Ottoman Armenian poet and translator who lived most of his life in Italy. In the Ottoman Empire, he founded the newspapers Surhantag and Nor Hosank, and was involved in the Armenian liberation movement.

== Biography ==
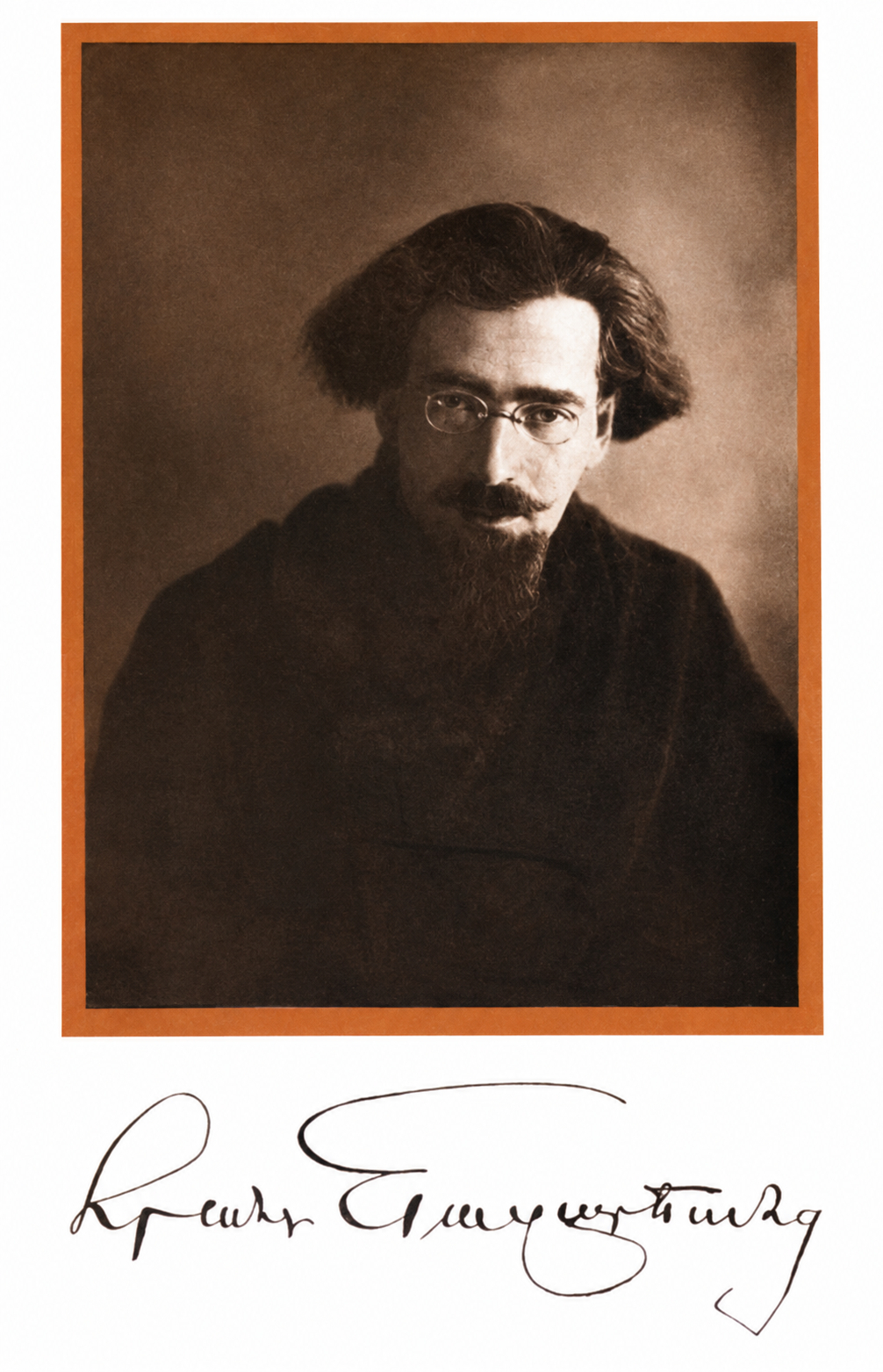
Hrand Nazariantz

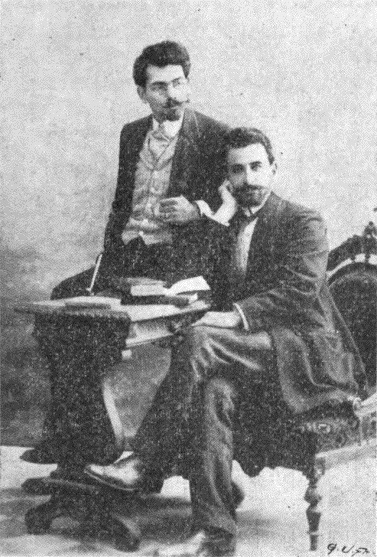
Nazariantz on the left with Armenian writer Karekin Gozigian.

Born in the Üsküdar district of Constantinople on January 8, 1880, he was the son of Diran Nazariantz, a businessman and member of the Armenian National Assembly from the district of Kumkapı, and Azniv Merametdjian. He attended the Berberian College from 1898, but he was expelled because of a relationship with another future writer, Mannig Berberian, daughter of Reteos Berberian, founder and owner of the college, and for asking her to marry him.

In 1902 he went to London to complete high school, and was hosted "by an ancient family of the English aristocracy." In the same year he completed the first draft of his collection Crucified Dreams.

In 1905 he matriculated at the Sorbonne in Paris and joined the Armenian liberation movement. In 1907 he went back to the Ottoman Empire because of his father's illness, to take over the management of the family business, established in the production of carpets and lace, which gave work to about two thousand workers, located in the districts of Üsküdar, Kumkapı, Kadıköy. This commitment continued along with his involvement in journalism and literary writing.

=== Political and literary activity in the Ottoman Empire ===
In 1908 he published the newspaper Surhantag (The Messenger) with Dikran Zaven, and in 1909 he founded the political and literary weekly Nor Hosank (New Wave), in collaboration with Karekin Gozikyan, called Yessalem, who was the founder of the first workers' union of the Armenian press in the Ottoman Empire (Matbaa İşçileri Meslek Birliği). He also works with fiction writer Rupen Zartarian and playwright Levon Shant in the magazine of art and controversy Baguine (Temple). Also Atom Yarjanian (Siamanto), an important Armenian journalist, wrote in this magazine.

In 1910 tries to establish with Gostan Zarian and Kegham Parseghian a circle of innovative art around Les volontés folles. In the same field comes out in Constantinople, accompanied by illustrations of cartoonists Enrico Sacchetti, and Yambo, the important essay on F.T. Marinetti and futurism (FT Marinetti and apagajapaštoitiine). In the same year he publishes a series of poetry books that stand out as the leading exponent of so-called symbol poetry in Armenian.

From 1911 is in correspondence with Filippo Tommaso Marinetti, Gian Pietro Lucini, Libero Altomare and engages on essays and translations in Armenian language, to make known their poetry together with that of Corrado Govoni and Enrico Cardile as part of a larger work of renovation in literature in the Armenian language in the light of the important Italian and French literature and historical events. In the same year Yenovk Armen published an essay titled Hrand Nazariantz and His Crucified Dreams.

In the same line is to be included in the volume Le Tasse et ses traducteurs arméniens. the test was preceded by a letter of recommendation from a famous linguist, philologist and translator of Dante's era father Arsen Ghazikian of Mechitar Congregation of Venice. This work, having as its topic translations into Armenian of Torquato Tasso's opera, released in French for the publishing house Arzouman types of Constantinople in 1912. Also in 1912, the re-release of The Crucified Dreams requires the attention of the public and critics.

From 1913 appear the original versions of the texts Aurora, soul of beauty, Gloria Victis, The Crown of Thorns, The great hymn of cosmic tragedy and an essay on Hranush Arshagyan.

Engaged in recent years to obtain the support of European intellectuals to the Armenian cause, finds in Italy other supporters. Among these are undoubtedly highlighting Giovanni Verga, Luigi Pirandello and later Umberto Zanotti Bianco, and many other well-known Italian and European intellectuals associated with the Masonic and Rosicrucian fraternities.

Sentenced to death in absentia by a court of the Ottoman Empire in 1913, he found asylum in the Italian Consulate of Constantinople, and once he obtains the nationality following marriage to the singer from Casamassima, Maddalena De Cosmis, called Lena, occurred on February 10, he moves to Bari in exile. There are, however, reports of cohabitation with Lena De Cosmis, the daughter of Leonardo De Cosmis, starting from 1911 through the header of a letter. The poet Gian Pietro Lucini, a friend of Nazariantz, two years before marriage, in fact, addressed his letters to the "family De Cosmis-Nazariantz" at "the Italian Post Office at Galata suburb of Constantinople".

Arriving in Italy, he intensified the relations with members of the Armenian diaspora and with the protagonists of the Italian culture, French and English, going abroad for study. At the same time he was hired as a professor of French and English at the Technical, Marine, and Professional Institute in Bari.

=== Literary activity in Italy ===
In 1915 collaborates with Il Ritmo and he prints for Laterza editors in Bari the first volume of the collection ideal of knowledge Armenia directed by him, his essay on the Armenian poet Bedros Tourian, and presentation of Enrico Cardile, which will also translate, for editions of the magazine Humanitas of Bari, I sogni Crocifissi (1916), Lo Specchio (1920) and Vahakn (1920). Next year is the beginning of collaboration The Hardening by Renato Fondi, with which will establish a regular and lasting relationship.

Following Nazariantz comes into contact with avant-garde Sicilian magazines hosting his contributions: The climb(1917), The Literary Kindler (1917) and La spirale where in 1919 has published an extract from the poem Lo Specchio. In Bari became a friend of Franco Casavola and is committed to promoting music production. The two work together to organize, with the help of Giuseppe Laterza, Giacomo Favia, Tina Suglia, and others, the Futurist evening at Teatro Piccinni of Bari, September 26, 1922. A few months later, on January 2, 1923, the evening's program at the futuristic Teatro Margherita Bari includes "the mimic action-drama" entitled "Lo specchio", with music by Franco Casavola Nazariantz inspired by the poem.

In 1924 the Alpes publishing house by Milan publishes the collection Tre poemi, including "Heaven of Shadows", "Aurora anima di bellezza ", "Saadi Nazyade flower," translated by Cesare Giardini.

In the same year his commitment to supporting the Armenian cause is also responsible for the foundation of Nor Arax, a village for Armenian exiles in the countryside of Bari, whose population helped nourish the production of carpets and lace. Today, what is left of Nor Arax is a few of the original houses as well as the columns at the entrance of the village on which the words "Nor Arax" (in both English and Armenian) are engraved. Nor Arax is located at the address Via Giovanni Amendola, 154 70126 Bari, Italy.

After 1943 he worked in Radio Bari for which he wrote and read various conferences of literary topic. In the same year he founded the magazines for inspiration symbolic-Masonic "Holy Grail" (1946) and "Graalismo" (1958) directed with his friend the poet and writer Potito Giorgio. On both serials writings appeared, among others, Giuseppe Ungaretti, Ada Negri, Liliana Scalero, Elpidio Jenco, Giuseppe Villaroel, Lionello Fiumi, Charles Plisnier and other photographs of well-known and lesser-known painters, among them to remember Fryda Laureti Ciletti.

The Italian translation of "Il Grande Canto della Cosmica tragedia" was published in 1946. Nazariantz published the "Manifesto Graalico" in 1951. In it, considered ending the Italian avant-garde, and the other signatories Nazariantz entrusted the resolution of intellectual-society relationship to the absolute primacy of art. In 1952 was published in the latest anthology entitled "Il ritorno dei poeti."

In 1953 a number of Italian and foreign intellectuals proposed his candidacy for the Nobel Prize of Literature, which was finally awarded to Winston Churchill. At the requests of the documents found in the name of Nazariantz highlight a lack of effectiveness on the part of applicants and it includes well as non-acceptance.

=== The last few years and death ===
The last years of Nazariantz's life were characterized by heightened economic hardships that had plagued him throughout his life as a stateless person. At the end of the fifties he was admitted to a hospital in Conversano, where he was surrounded by affection and esteem of some young friends Conversano, not that they wanted to rediscover the enormous human and intellectual value.

In recent years, verified the nullity of his first marriage, also died Vittoria Strazzaboschi his faithful companion for many years, wed with Maria Lucarelli. In 1960 he moved from Conversano, a town he so loved, to Casamassima, also in the province of Bari, where he lived in conditions of almost complete destitution with his second wife Maria Lucarelli. He died two years later in 1962. Throughout his life, maintained a great admiration for the fairer sex, which had a glimpse of the symbolism of Miriam, due, perhaps, the mystical and esoteric teachings of Giuliano Kremmerz.

Nazariantz is buried in the Cimitero Monumentale cemetery of Bari (entrance to the cemetery is located at the intersection of Via Nazariantz Hrand and Via Francesco Crispi), in an almost anonymous tomb that only bears his name, dates of birth and death, and the label of "POETA" (poet). The address of the tomb within the cemetery is campo 34, number 206. The tomb is owned by the family of Diran Timurian, an entrepreneur in the import-export of oriental carpets, one of many Armenians whose family had arrived in Bari thanks to Nazariantz's humanitarian work.

== Quotes ==
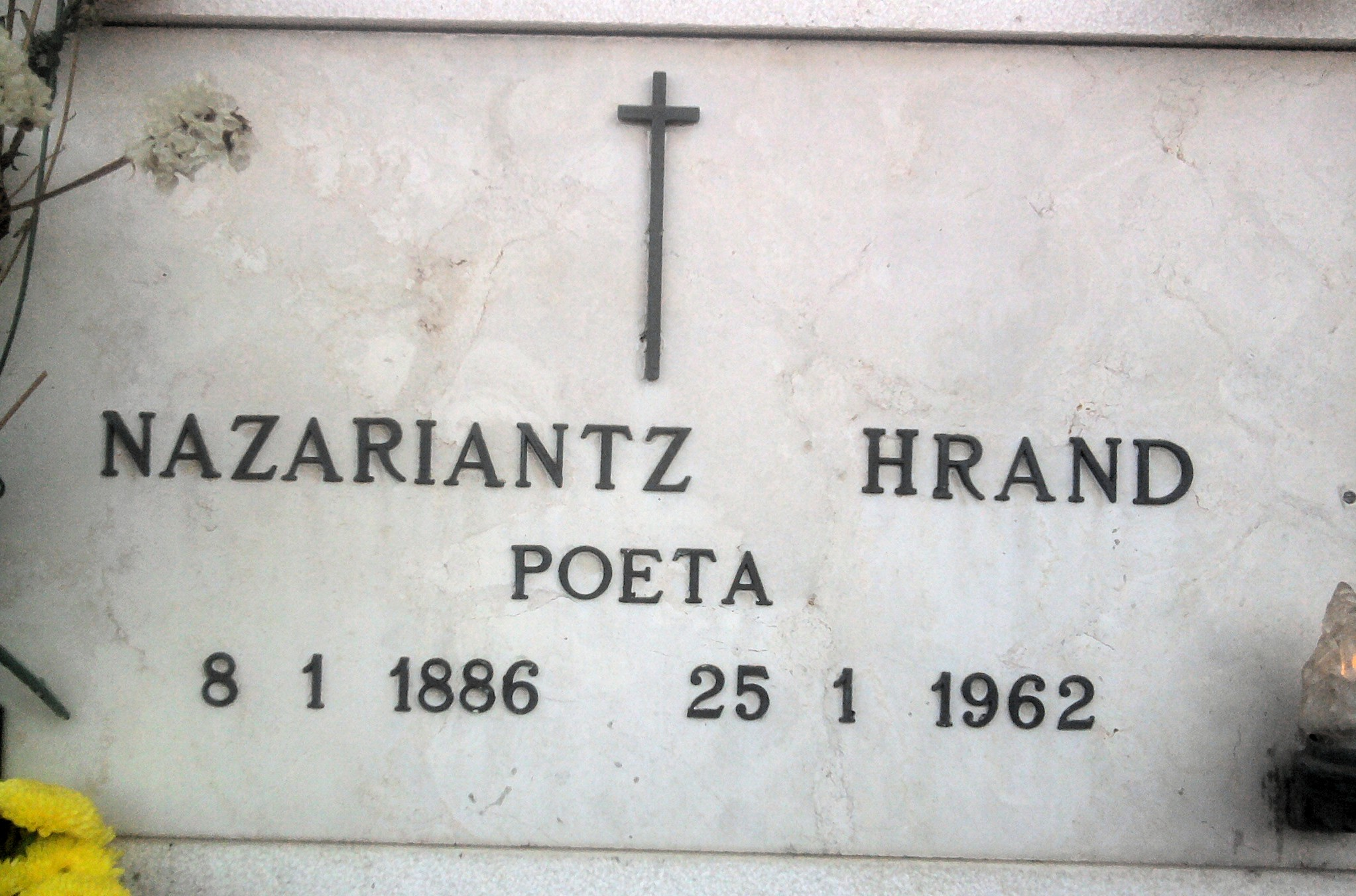

The Sicilian poet Enrico Cardile, wrote of him: "Nazariantz is a man of inexhaustible energy, a consistently exceptional, with a prodigious enthusiasm, fascinating in its resolute modesty. His enthusiasm can community, his passion becomes epidemic, if you know you will love it, if you love him you feel ready to share its risks and dedicate to his cause (Ed namely Armenia free)"

Daniel Varujan, known Armenian poet, wrote: "Nazariantz has written poems that can match those in their splendor deep Stéphane Mallarmé, French poet. His soul has in fact an exceptional affinity with the soul of the prince of poets. Soul always be striving intoxication unknown and indefinite that one can hardly perceive through the human aspiration. His images are evocative of a depth. Nazariantz is a poet of light"

== Works ==
- «Եղիա Տէմիրճիպաշեանի սիրային նամակները, 1886-1889. երկու ինքնատիպ լուսանկարներով եւ իր ձեռագիր մէկ նամակով» (Love Letters of Yeghia Demirjibashian, 1886-1889: with Two Original Photographs and A Handwritten Letter), Constantinople, Der-Nersesian, 1910
- «Ֆ.Թ. Մառինէթթի եւ ապագայապաշտութիւնը» (F. T. Marinetti and Futurism), Constantinople, Onnig Parseghian and Son, 1910
- «Հերանուշ Արշակեան. Իր կեանքը եւ բանաստեղծությունները» (Heranush Arshakian: Her Life and Poetry), Constantinople, Der Nersesian, 1910
- «Դասսօ եւ իր հայ թարգմանիչները» (Tasso and His Armenian Translators), Constantinople, Arzouman, 1912
- «Խաչուած երազներ» (Crucified Dreams), Constantinople, Der-Nersesian, 1912
- Bedros Tourian poeta armeno, dalla sua vita e dalle sue pagine migliori, con cenno sull'arte armena. Con una presentazione di Enrico Cardile, Bari, Laterza, 1915
- L'Armenia, il suo martirio e le sue rivendicazioni, con introduzione di Giorgio D'Acandia (pseud. di Umberto Zanotti Bianco), Catania, Battiato, 1916
- I trovieri dell'Armenia nella loro vita e nei loro canti: con cenno sui canti popolari armeni, prefazione di Ferdinando Russo Bari, Humanitas, 1916
- I sogni crocefissi, versione italiana di Enrico Cardile; con una premessa del traduttore e note bio-bibliografiche, Bari, Humanitas, 1916
- Arsciak Ciobanian: nella sua vita e nelle sue pagine migliori, in collaborazione di Mario Virgilio Garea; con prefazione di Mario Pilo, Bari, Humanitas, 1917
- Muoio di sete..., da La tristezza delle rosee nudità, canto e pianoforte di Franco Casavola, parole di Hrand Nazariantz, Milano, Ricordi e C., 1920
- Lo specchio, versione italiana di Enrico Cardile, Bari, Humanitas, 1920
- Vahakn, versione italiana di Enrico Cardile, Bari, Humanitas, 1920
- L'arte di Armenia, 1924
- Tre poemi, tradusse dall'armeno C. Giardini, Milan, Alpes, 1924
- O sonno, sonno, nostra ultima festa dal Paradiso delle Ombre di Hrand Nazariantz, traduzione dall'armeno di C. Giardini. Poemetto per canto e pianoforte, Bologna, Bongiovanni, 1935
- Il grande canto della cosmica tragedia: Hur Hayran. Versione italiana di Enrico Cardile, con una allocuzione estetico ermetica di Eli Drac. Xilografie di Piero Casotti, Bari, Ed. Gioconda, 1946 e 1948
- Il ritorno dei poeti ed altre poesie, Florence, Kursaal, 1952
- Հրանտ Նազարեանց, «Աստեղահեւ Մենութիւն - Ընտրանի» (Star-Filled Solitude: Anthology), Yerevan, Sargis Khachents, 2008.
- I Sogni Crocifissi, poesie scelte a cura di Dorella Cianci, Foggia, Sentieri Meridiani, 2011

== Secondary bibliography ==
- Yenovk Armen, Հրանտ Նազարեանց եւ իր «Խաչուած երազներ»ը, Costantinopoli, Der Nersessian, 1911
- Simon Eremian (Atrushan), Հրանտ Նազարեանց: Ուսումնասիրական ակնարկ մը, Ղալաթիա, տպ. Շանթ, 1912.
- Giuseppe Cartella Gelardi, Per la traduzione italiana de "I sogni crocefissi" di Hrand Nazariantz, Bari, Soc. tip. editrice barese, 1916
- Giulio Gaglione, La benda sugli occhi: Primo saggio di una interpretazione generale della poesia contemporanea, Napoli, Ed. delle "Crociere Barbare", 1919
- Massimo Gaglione, La Poesia di Hrand Nazariantz, Marcianise, autoedizione, 1918
- Massimo Gaglione, Nazariantz e Barbusse, Caserta, 1921
- Raffaele Carrieri, Con Hrand Nazariantz al villaggio armeno “Nor Arax”, “Il Mezzogiorno”, 15-16 novembre 1927.
- Giuseppe Cartella Gelardi, Il grande canto della Cosmica tragedia, Milano, 1932
- Domenico Tarantini, Compie trentatré anni la repubblica del vecchio poeta, in "Settimo Giorno", 1958.
- Giuseppe Lucatuorto, Un poeta cosmico, Hrand Nazariantz, "Il Corriere del giorno". Bari 16 febbraio 1962.
- Pasquale Sorrenti, Hrand Nazariantz. Uomo, poeta, patriota, Bari, Levante, 1978.
- Mara Filippozzi, Hrand Nazariantz. Poeta armeno esule in Puglia, Galatina, Congedo, 1987.
- Domenico Cofano (a cura di), Hrand Nazariantz fra Oriente e Occidente. Atti del Convegno internazionale di studi (Conversano, 28-29 novembre 1987), Fasano, Schena, 1987
- Domenico Cofano, Il crocevia occulto. Lucini, Nazariantz e la cultura del primo Novecento, Fasano, Schena, 1990.
- Krikor Beledian, Հայկական ապագայապաշտութիւն եւ Հրանտ Նազարեանց, (trad. Il futurismo armeno e Hrand Nazariantz), in "Bazmavep", Revue d’etudes armeniennes, Venezia 1990, vol.3-4, (in armeno).
- Yervant Ter Khachatrian, Հրանտ Նազարեանց. լուսաւոր բանաստեղծ, (trad. Hrand Nazariantz è un poeta luminoso), in "Azg Daily cultural online", 29/04/2006.
- Paolo Lopane, Hrand Nazariantz, troviero d'Armenia, in "Vie della Tradizione", Anno XXXVII, N. 147 (settembre-dicembre 2007)
- Paolo Lopane (a cura di), Hrand Nazariantz, Fedele d'Amore, Bari, FAL Vision, 2012.
- Vartan Matiossian, Letters of Hrand Nazariantz to Yenovk Armen, "Bazmavep: Hayagtakan banasirakan grakan handes", 165, 2007, pp. 323–380
- Armenia: lo sterminio dimenticato, a cura di Tiziano Arrigoni, Piombino, La bancarella, 2008
- Krikor Beledian, Haykakan Futurizm - Armenian Futurism, Yerevan, Sargis Khachents P.H., 2009
- Carlo Coppola, Hrand Nazariantz, la storia di un uomo unico vissuto nel Sud, "LSD Magazine", Bari 10/03/2011.
- Emilia Askhen De Tommasi, Nor Arax: storia del villaggio Armeno di Bari, Bari, LB edizioni, 2017, ISBN 978-88-9483-106-1

=== Archives ===
- ANIMI, Galleria Fotografica A.N.I.M.I. sezione "Nor Arax"
- Centro Studi "Hrand Nazariantz", Centro Studi Hrand Nazariantz , Bari, Italy
- Centro Ricerche di Storia e Arte - Conversano, L'Archivio Nazariantz, Conversano, Italy

=== Critical Essay ===
- Paolo Lopane, Hrand Nazariantz, troviero d'Armenia, in "Vie della Tradizione", Anno XXXVII, N. 147 (settembre-dicembre 2007)
- Մելանիա Բադալեան, Ի ՏԱԼԱՑԻՆԵՐԻ ՀԱՐԳԱՆՔԻ ՏՈՒՐՔԸՙ ՀՐԱՆՏ ՆԱԶԱՐՅԱՆՑԻՆ, azg.am, 28/10/2012
- Carlo Coppola, Hrand Nazariantz, la storia di un uomo unico vissuto nel Sud, lsdmagazine.it
- ՅՈՒՐԻ ԽԱՉԱՏՐՅԱՆ, Hrand Nazariantz. Poeta Luminoso, azg.am
- (traduction) Georges Festa, Nazariantz, un poète arménien à Bari, armenews.com
- Francesco Medici, Arslan e Nazariantz, voci del popolo armeno, Paneacqua,6 febbraio 2012.
- Vito Ricci, Il legame millenario tra la Puglia e gli Armeni, modugno.it
- Vito Ricci, Nazariantz, un poeta armeno a Bari, in comunitaarmena.it
- Domenico Vittorio Ripa Montesano, In memoria del Fratello Hrand Nazariantz, notiziariomassonicoitaliano.blogspot.it
- Magda Vigilante, Il poeta Hrand Nazariantz e il Villaggio Armeno di Nox Arax, filidaquilone.it,
- Magda Vigilante, Carteggio Hrand Nazariantz - Liliana Scalero. Storia di un’amicizia fraterna nel comune amore per la poesia e la cultura, comunitaarmena.it
- Չարչարենց, Հրանտ Նազարյանց` 20-րդ դարասկզբի հայ բանաստեղծ, Ustahrant, 05/07/2010

=== Video ===
- Valerio Droga, Nor Arax e Il ritorno della Memoria in Nor Arax, enclave armena in territorio italiano, Università degli Studi di Palermo, A.A. 2006-2007
- Delta TV, Carlo Coppola parla di Hrand Nazariantz, parte prima, parte 2, 15/03/2011,
- Convegno, Hrand Nazariantz: Le Tracce e il Volto, intervento biografico di Carlo Coppola, Conversano (Ba), Chiesa di San Giuseppe, 05/12/2011
- a cura di Enzo del Vecchio, Servizio Giornalistico "Il poeta Armeno", 12/02/2012.
- a cura di Enzo del Vecchio, Servizio Giornalistico "Il poeta Armeno", ESTOVEST - Puntata del 4 marzo 2012]
- Presentazione del volume "Un legame tra Nardò e l'Armenia" - intervento di Rosalia Chiarappa, parte prima, parte seconda, Nardò (Le) 20/02/2012.
- Delta TV, Carlo Coppola parla di Hrand Nazariantz e Carmelo Bene, 10/03/2012,
- Presentazione del volume Il Genocidio Armeno nella storia e nella memoria di Maria Immacolata Macioti, Lecce (Officine culturali ERGOT) 22/03/2012.
- Presentazione del volume Hrand Nazariantz, Fedele d'Amore, Bari (Libreria Laterza) 15/04/2012.
- Presentazione del volume Hrand Nazariantz, Fedele d'Amore, Bari (Sala Consiliare del Comune) 20/02/2012.
- Inaugurazione della mostra Hrand Nazariantz: L'Oriente, le tracce, il volto , Acquaviva delle Fonti, 03/09/2012

=== Essays ===
- Paolo Lopane (a cura di), Hrand Nazariantz, Fedele d'Amore, Bari, FAL Vision, 2012.
- Carlo Coppola, Hrand Nazariantz, la storia di un uomo unico vissuto nel Sud, lsdmagazine.it
- ՅՈՒՐԻ ԽԱՉԱՏՐՅԱՆ, Hrand Nazariantz. Poeta Luminoso, azg.am
- Paolo Lopane, Hrand Nazariantz, Troviero d'Armenia, lopanepaolo.it
- Vito Ricci, Il legame millenario tra la Puglia e gli Armeni, modugno.it
- Magda Vigilante, Il poeta Hrand Nazariantz e il Villaggio Armeno di Nox Arax, filidaquilone.it, n.9
- Չարչարենց, Հրանտ Նազարյանց` 20-րդ դարասկզբի հայ բանաստեղծ, Ustahrant, 05/07/2010.
- Francesco Medici, Arslan e Nazariantz, voci del popolo armeno, Paneacqua, 6 febbraio 2012.
- Emilia Askhen De Tommasi, Nor Arax: storia del villaggio Armeno di Bari, Bari, LB edizioni, 2017, ISBN 978-88-9483-106-1

== Translation ==
- "Selected Poetry"
- "The Great Song of the Cosmic Tragedy (1919)"
- "The Troubadours of Armeniain Their Lives and Songs (1915)"
