= Berberian =

Berberian or Berberyan (Armenian: Պէրպէրեան) is an Armenian surname. Notable people with the surname include:

- Alain Berberian (1953–2017), French film director and writer
- Ara Berberian (1930–2005), American bass singer
- Cathy Berberian (1925–1983), American mezzo-soprano and composer
- Charles Berberian (born 1959), French cartoonist, illustrator and writer
- Hampartzoum Berberian (1905–1999), Armenian composer and conductor
- John Berberian (born 1941), American musician playing the oud
- Martin Berberyan (born 1980), Armenian Freestyle wrestler
- Reteos Berberian (1848–1907), Armenian educator, pedagogue, principal, writer, poet
- Schahan Berberian (1891–1956), composer, son of Reteos Berberian
- Viken Berberian (born 1966), Armenian-American writer

== Other ==
- Berberian School, a school in Constantinople, founded by Reteos Berberian
- Berberian Sound Studio, a 2012 British horror film
