= Ruben Sevak Museum =

Coordinates: 40°09′41″N 44°17′26″E

- Ռուբեն Սևակ թանգարան
- Established: 10 September 2013
- Location: Vagharshapat, Armenia
- Type: Art museum

Ruben Sevak Museum (Armenian: Ռուբեն Սևակ թանգարան) is an art museum located in Vagharshapat, Armenia. Opened on 10 September 2013, the museum is housed in the Ghazarapat building of the Mother See of Holy Etchmiadzin, adjacent to the Mother Cathedral. Ghazarapat itself is an 8th-century building previously used as a monastic residence. The first floor has been renovated through the efforts of the French-Armenian benefactor Hovhannes Chilingirian; who is a nephew of the Armenian poet Ruben Sevak.

Priests from the Etchmiadzin Cathedral, archbishop of Armenian Apostolic churches in Armenia, Georgia and Russia and Eastern Europe Raphael Minasian, Hasmik Poghosyan the minister of culture, Hranush Hakobyan the minister of diaspora, operators in culture and education were present at the inauguration ceremony of the museum.

== Exhibitions ==
The museum is dedicated to Ruben Sevak, Krikor Zohrab, Siamanto, Daniel Varoujan, Komitas, as well as other Armenian intellectuals who became victims of the Armenian genocide. Consisted of 4 large showrooms, the museum is home to more than 200 pieces of paintings, including the works of Sevak.

In the museum, the personal objects, documents, photos, manuscripts, works of art belonging to Ruben Sevak, a prose-writer, doctor, and a victim of the Armenian Genocide, as well as paintings by Western-Armenian artists are put on display. The museum also keeps canvas paintings presented by Hovhannes Chilinkirian to the Catholicosate of all Armenians.

== Gallery ==
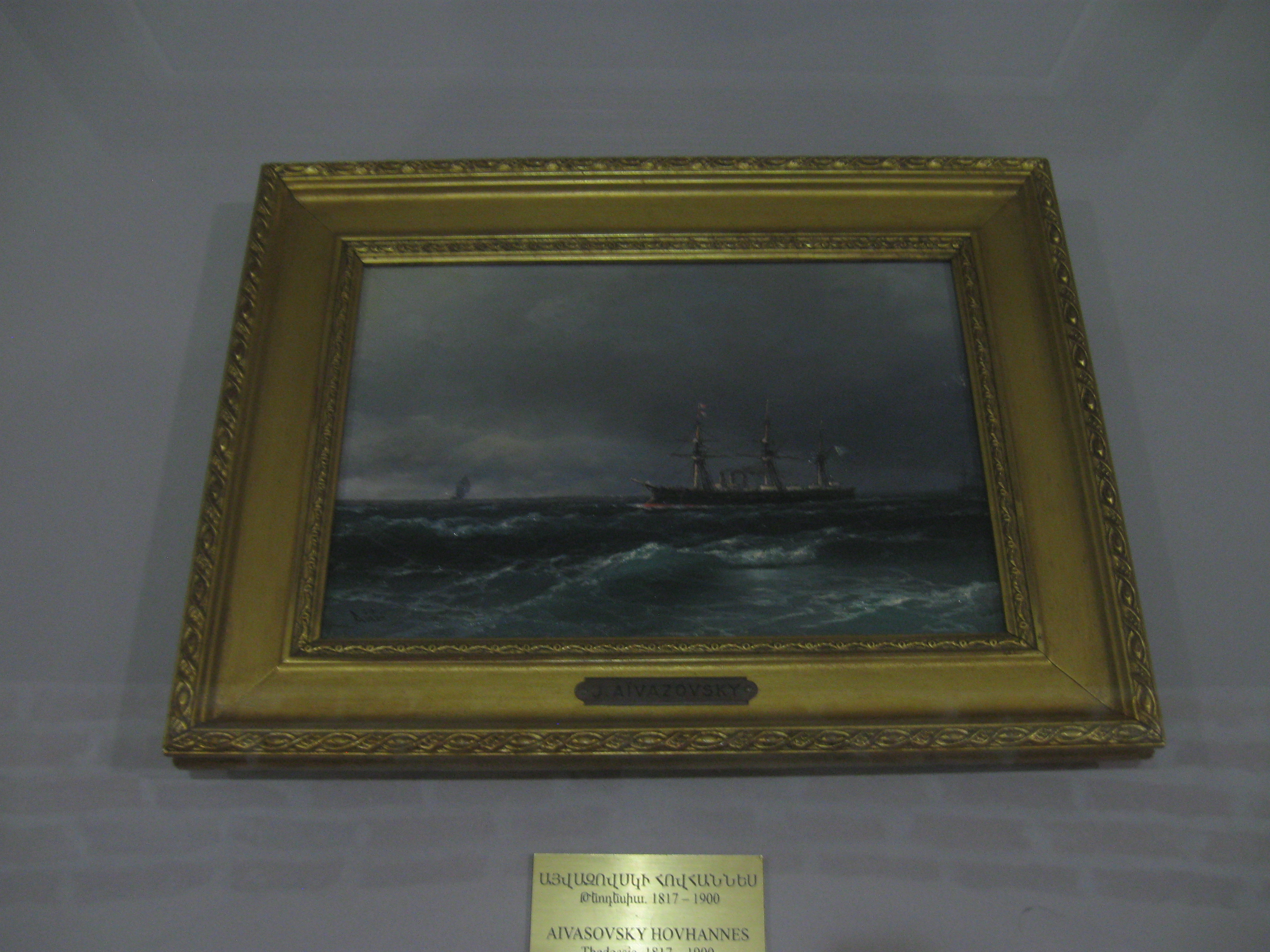
Painting on Canvas by Aivazovsky

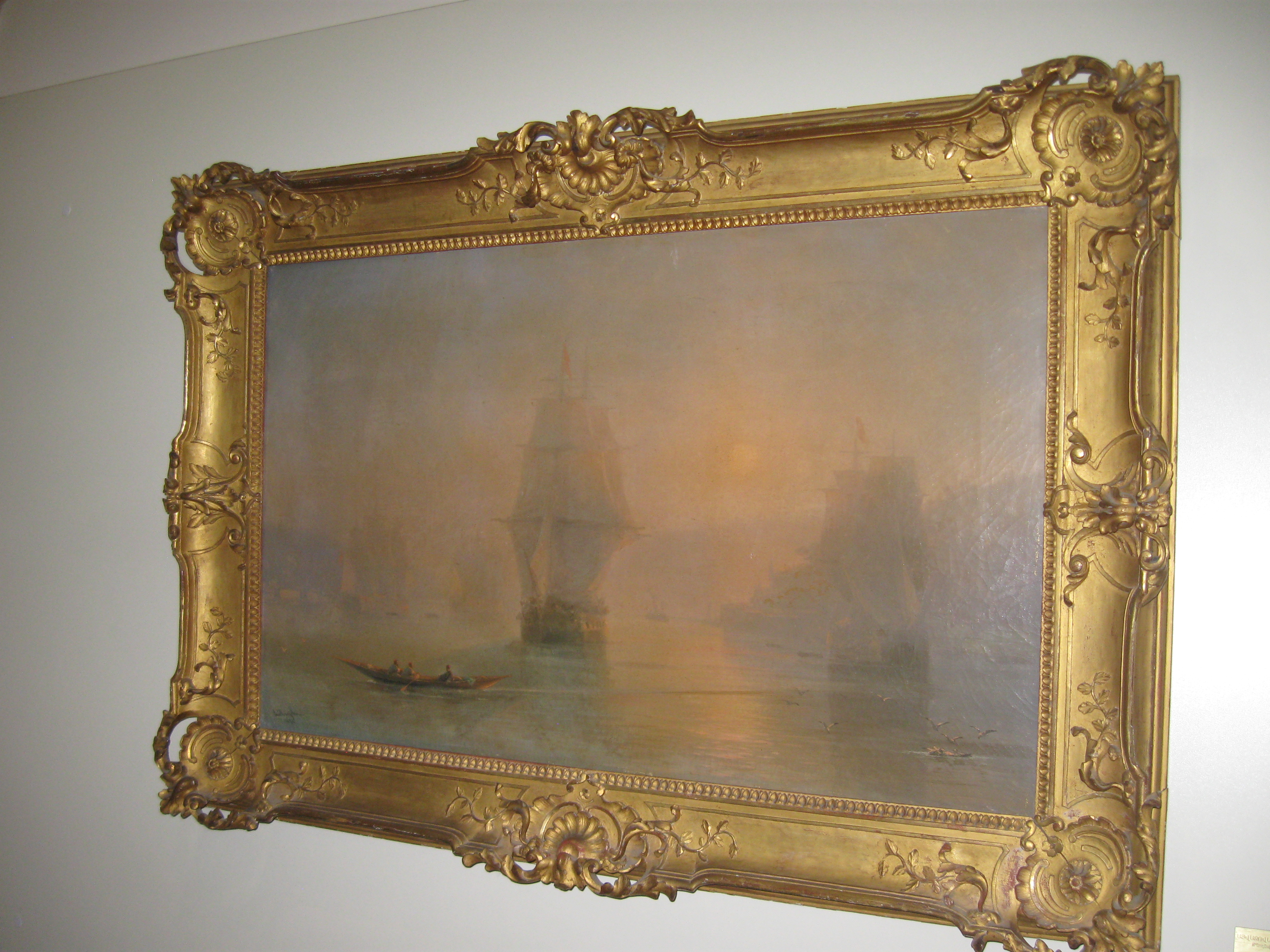
Painting on Canvas by Aivazovsky

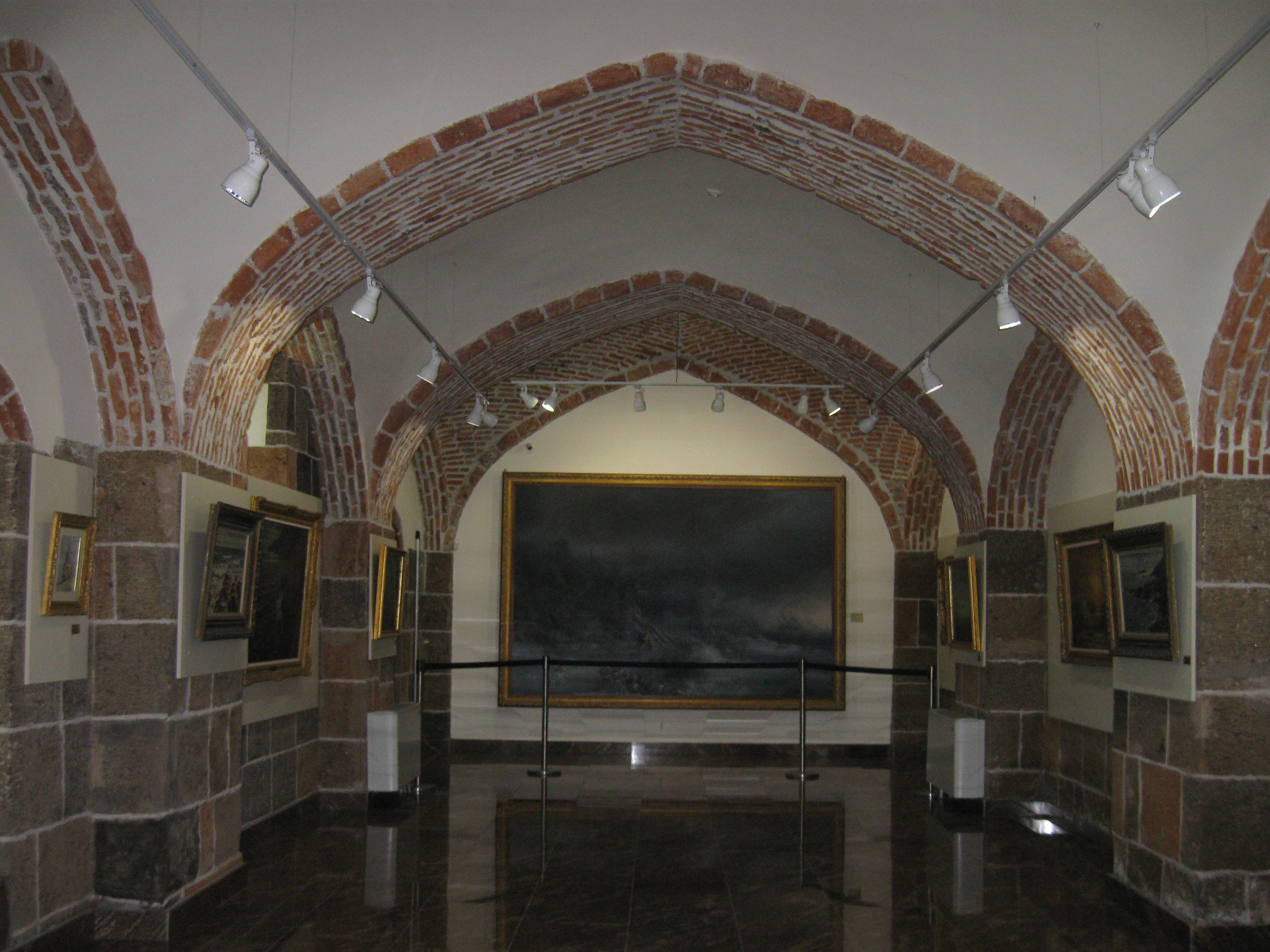
The Museum
