= Mihr (theatre) =

Armenian contemporary dance theatre

MIHR Contemporary Dance Theatre
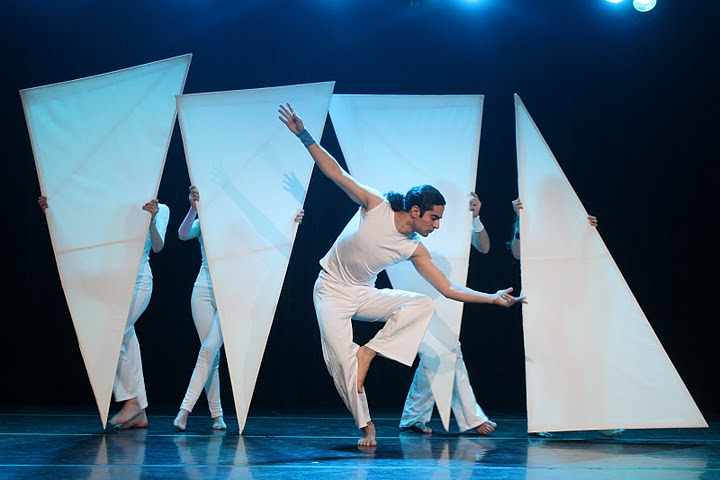
- Dreams in Dreams A performance by MIHR theatre
- Formation: 2003, April 7
- Type: Theatre group
- Purpose: Dance theatre
- Location: Yerevan, Armenia
- Members: Tsolak MLKE-Galstyan; Shoghakat MLKE-Galstyan; Petros Ghazanchyan
- Artistic director: Tsolak MLKE-Galstyan
- Website: http://mihrtheatre.com/

MIHR (Armenian: Միհր) is a contemporary dance company in Armenia. MIHR Theatre was established in 2003 by sister and brother, Shoghakat and Tsolak Mlke-Galstyans in Yerevan, Armenia. MIHR Theatre is the first contemporary dance theatre in Armenia.

== History ==
MIHR theatre was named after Mihr, the Armenian pagan god of Sun as symbol of enlightenment. The theatre is mainly addressing social injustice such as problems of war and peace, domestic violence etc.

Throughout its existence MIHR theatre has worked in many different genres of motion such as contemporary dance, site-specific performance, emotional dance, inclusive dance, action-painting, open-air performances, physical performance and drama dance.

MIHR Theatre has created its own way of dance choreography titled "Music of Movement". This is a unique technique combining music and dance, and at the same time it is based on a dancer who is creating music via movements. The instruments for "Music of Movement" were designed and created by MIHR Theatre for this special project.

MIHR Theatre has produced 21 contemporary dance performances, 8 films. The theatre has organized different festivals: Asank Anank (2015), The Book Fest (2017), Polish Platform at the HIGH Fest International Performing Arts Festival (2016, 2018); open-air events, parades: Opening Parades of the HIGH Fest International Performing Arts Festival (2005, 2006, 2007, 2008, 2009, 2010) and other events in different cities.

MIHR Theatre has participated in numerous international festivals.

== Cultural collaborations and joint performances ==
MIHR Theatre pays great attention to international cultural collaborations and has joint performances and collaborations with theatres and performers from different countries:

- 2015 — joint performance "Lavash" with Gabrielle Neuhaus Physical Theatre (Israel)
- 2015 — performance "Names": collaboration with Alexander Aram Adamyan-Harvey (United States)
- 2014 — joint performance "Water by the Spoonful" with US Embassy in Armenia, advisors: Armando Riesco (United States) and KJ Sanchez (United States)
- 2014 — joint performance "P2" with Sayeh Theatre (Iran)
- 2007 — joint performance "Abay 4" by M. Telibekov with Art & Shock Theatre (Kazakhstan)
- 2006 — project "Inside" with Laboratory of Stage Arts (Latvia)

== Creative co-productions with movie-makers ==
- 2018 — "Taniel" - film noir
- 2015 — "Remembering Armenia" - documentary movie
- 2013 — "The Percussion Instruments" - documentary/educational feature film
- 2013 — "Zaum Tractor" - video art
- 2008 — "Kamancha" - documentary/educational feature film
- 2007 — "Roots" - dance movie with ethno-modern sculptures
- 2007 — "Angel on the Roofs" - dance movie
- 2006 — "Dreams or Reality" - social movie

== Gallery ==
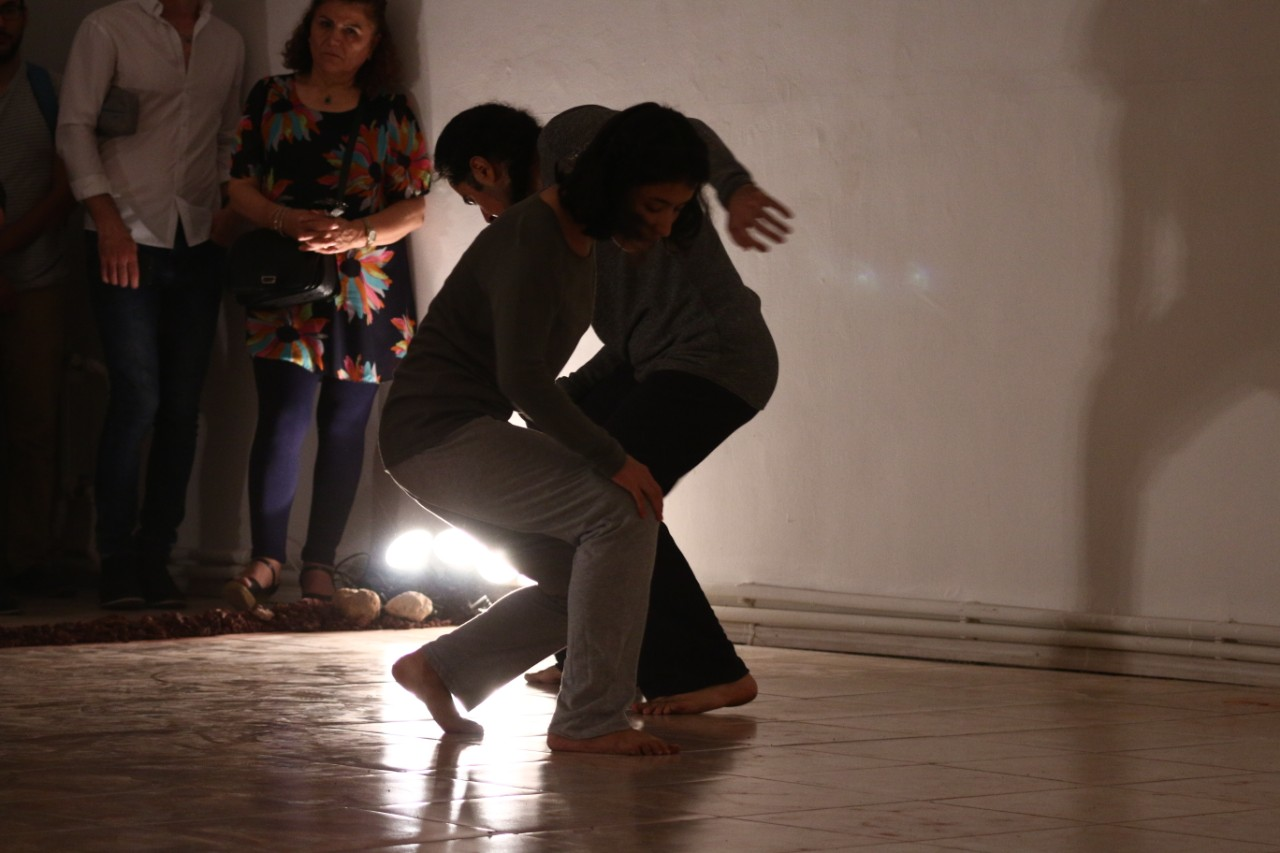
The Song of a Refugee

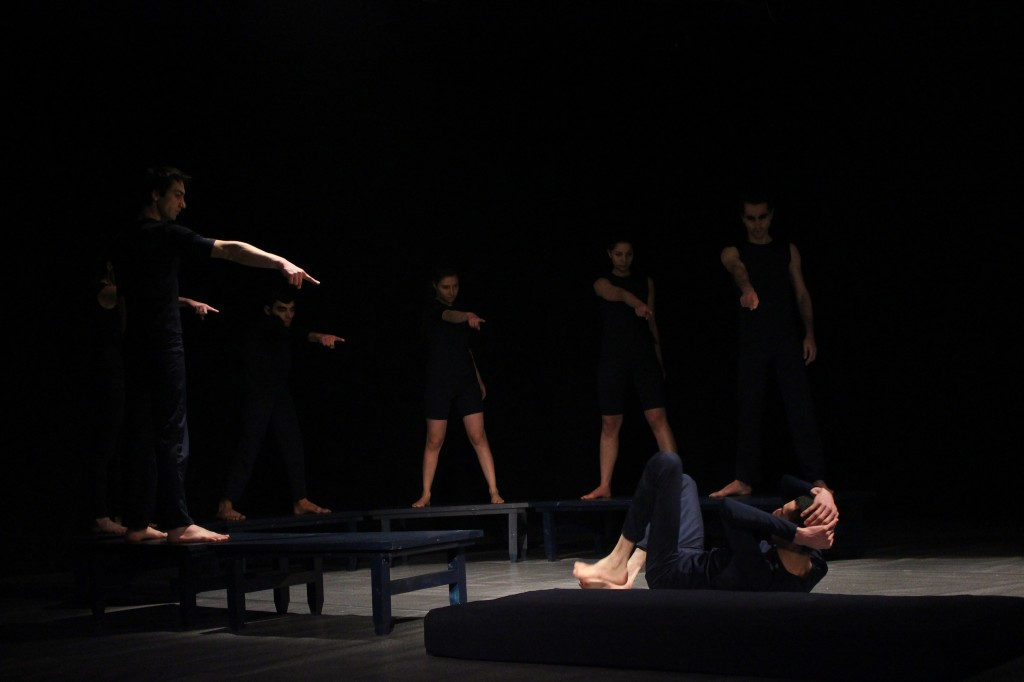
We

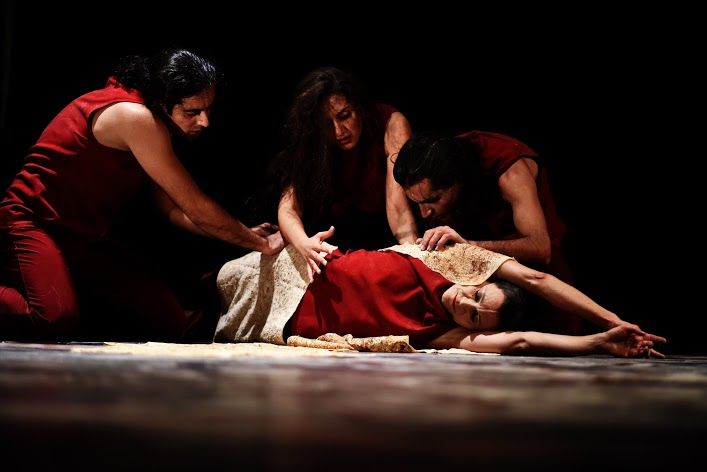
Lavash

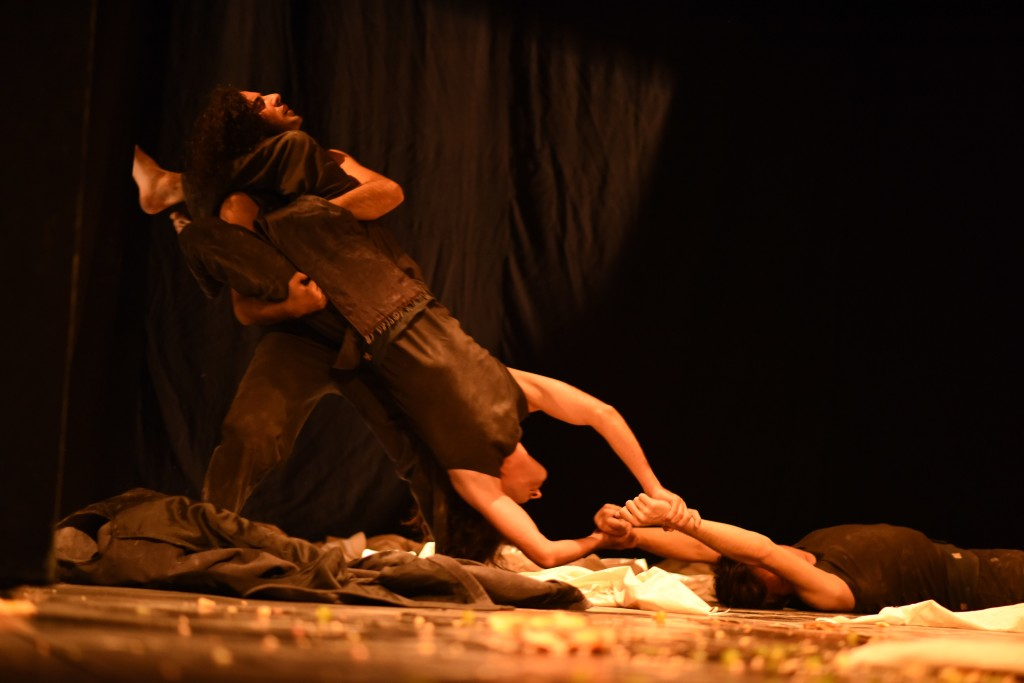
Names

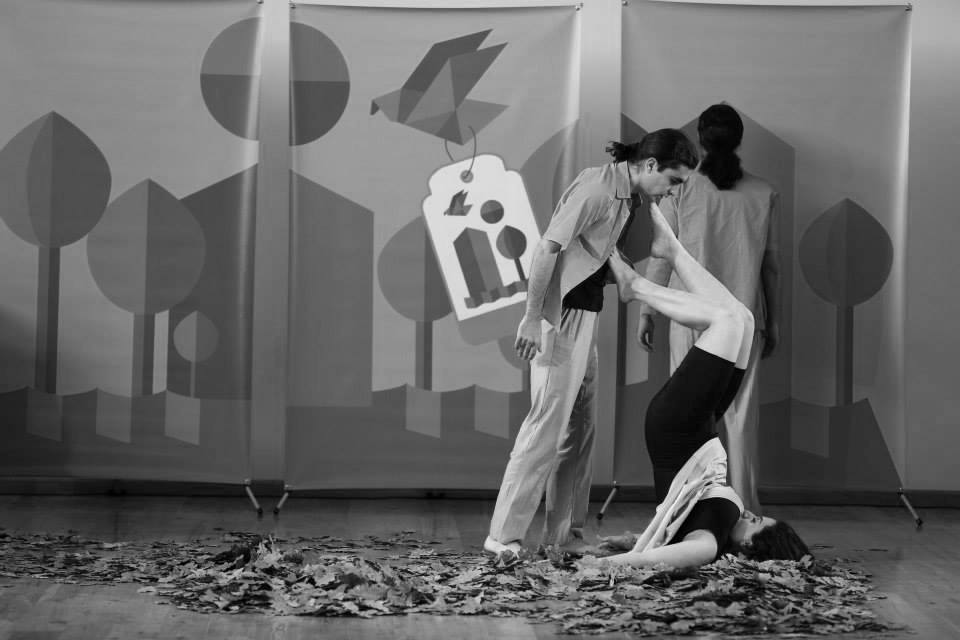
The Fly

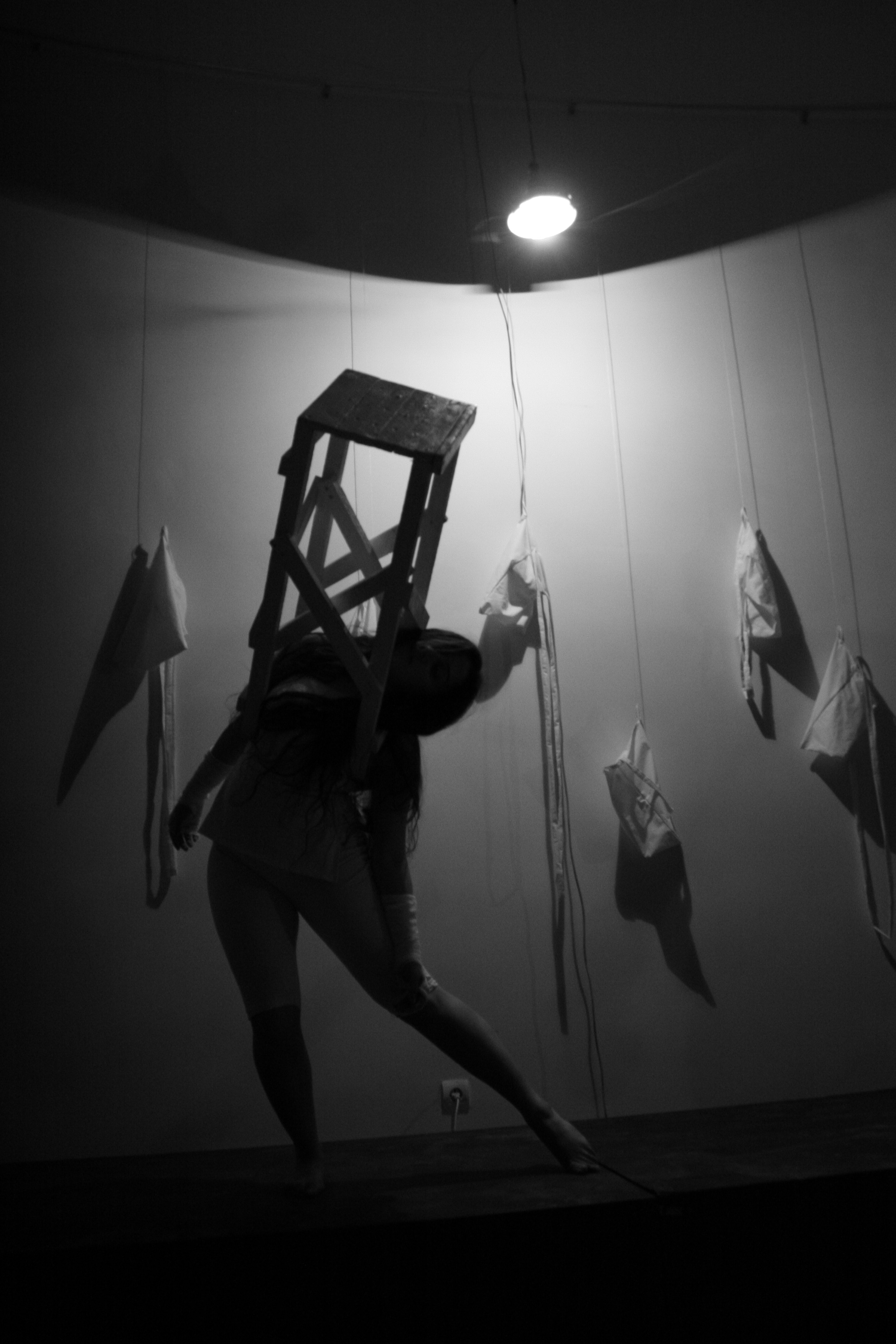
No More Lies
