= Hovhannes Hintliyan =

Armenian teacher

- Born: 1866; Uskudar, Constantinople, Ottoman Empire
- Died: 16 March 1950 (aged 83–84); Istanbul, Turkey
- Occupations: Teacher, pedagogue, publisher, and educator.

Hovhannes Hintliyan (Armenian: Յովհաննէս Հինդլեան; 1866 in Üsküdar, Ottoman Empire – March 16, 1950, in Istanbul) was an Armenian teacher, pedagogue, publisher, and educator. He was the founder of Nor Tbrots (New School), a prestigious Armenian school in the Pangalti district of Istanbul.

== Biography ==
Hovhannes Hintliyan was born in 1866 in Üsküdar, a district of Istanbul that is situated on the Asiatic side of the Bosphorus. He attended the prestigious Berberian Varjaran (High School) and studied under his mentor Reteos Berberian (Who was the founder and principal of the school as well). Upon gaining an outstanding reputation at school, he eventually taught at Makrouhian Varjaran in the Beşiktaş district and eventually became the principal of the school. He then taught and at times became principal of the following schools: Surp Haç Tbrevank, Tbrotsaser, Aramyan, Dadyan, and Getronagan. He traveled to Europe and gained insight into how the school systems functioned there. He met with famous teachers and pedagogues such as Pestalozzi and Maria Montessori. When he returned to Istanbul, he established the Nor Tbrots (New School) in the Pangalti district which opened its doors on October 15, 1909. It was first a boys school, it later accepted girls starting 1925. The school shut down in 1988 but was reopened in 2003 in Kayan, Armenia with the help of Hintliyan Nor Tbrots alumni across the world. He was one was the founding members of Homenetmen, an Armenian athletic organization.

He was admitted to the Yedikule Surp Pırgiç Armenian Hospital in Istanbul in 1949 due to deteriorating health conditions. He died on March 16, 1950, at the age of 84.
