= Ruben Sevak =

Armenian writer and doctor (1886–1915)

Rupen Chilingiryan (Sevag) Ռուբէն Սեւակ
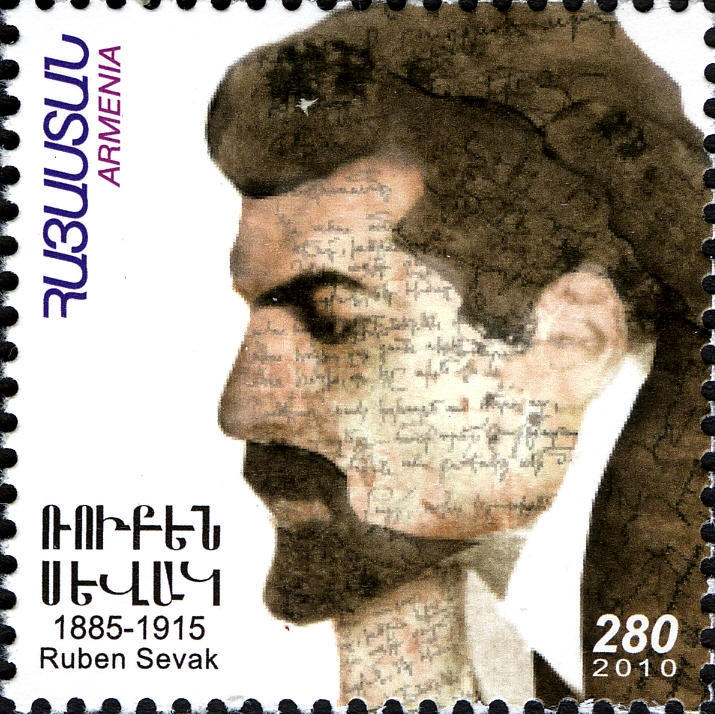
- Ruben Sevak featured on a 2011 Armenian stamp
- Born: February 15, 1885; Silivri, Ottoman Empire
- Died: August 26, 1915 (aged 30); Çankırı, Ottoman Empire
- Occupations: poet, prose-writer, and doctor.

Rupen Chilingiryan (Sevag) (Ռուբէն Յովհաննէսի Չիլինկիրեան (Սեւակ), February 28, 1886, Silivri, Ottoman Empire – August 26, 1915, Çankırı, Ottoman Empire) was an Armenian poet, prose-writer, and doctor. He was sent to a prison along with Siamanto and Daniel Varoujan during the Armenian Genocide.

== Biography ==
Rupen Sevag received his elementary education in his birthplace at the Askanazian school. He then moved to Constantinople (now Istanbul) and studied at the prestigious Berberian School. He graduated in 1905 and went to Lausanne, Switzerland, to pursue studies at the medical school. He met there his future wife, Helene Apell. After graduating in 1911, he decided to go back to Constantinople in 1914 with his family. This decision would cost him his life. He was arrested on at the onset of the Armenian genocide on April 24, 1915, and killed on August 26, 1915.

=== Creative poet ===
Sevag's first poem was printed in 1905. Sevag is mostly known as a lyric poet. He also composed many love songs, highly acclaimed for their feeling and depth. His poetry was characterized by freshness and precision of language, and noted for its varying meter and its musicality. His poetry captures the history and essence of Western Armenian literature while creating a totally new genre.
