= Varoujan =

The Armenian name Վարուժան, transliterated Varoujan (in Western Armenian), Varujan, or Varuzhan (Russian: Варужан), is both a masculine given name and a surname. It may refer to:

== Varoujan ==
- Varoujan Garabedian (born 1954), Syrian-Armenian activist
- Varoujan Hakhbandian, Iranian composer and songwriter of Armenian descent
- Varoujan Hergelian (born 1946), Archbishop, Catholicosal Vicar of the Armenian Prelature of Cyprus

== Varujan ==
- Daniel Varujan (1884–1915), (Taniel Varoujan in Western Armenian), Armenian poet
- Varujan Boghosian (1926–2020), American sculptor
- Varujan Kojian (1935–1993), American conductor
- Varujan Vosganian (born 1958), Romanian politician, economist, essayist and poet

== Varuzhan ==
- Varuzhan Akobian (born 1983), Armenian-American chess grandmaster
- Varuzhan Sukiasyan (born 1956), Armenian footballer and manager
- Varuzhan Yepremyan (born 1959), Armenian painter
