= Taniel =

2018 British and Armenian film

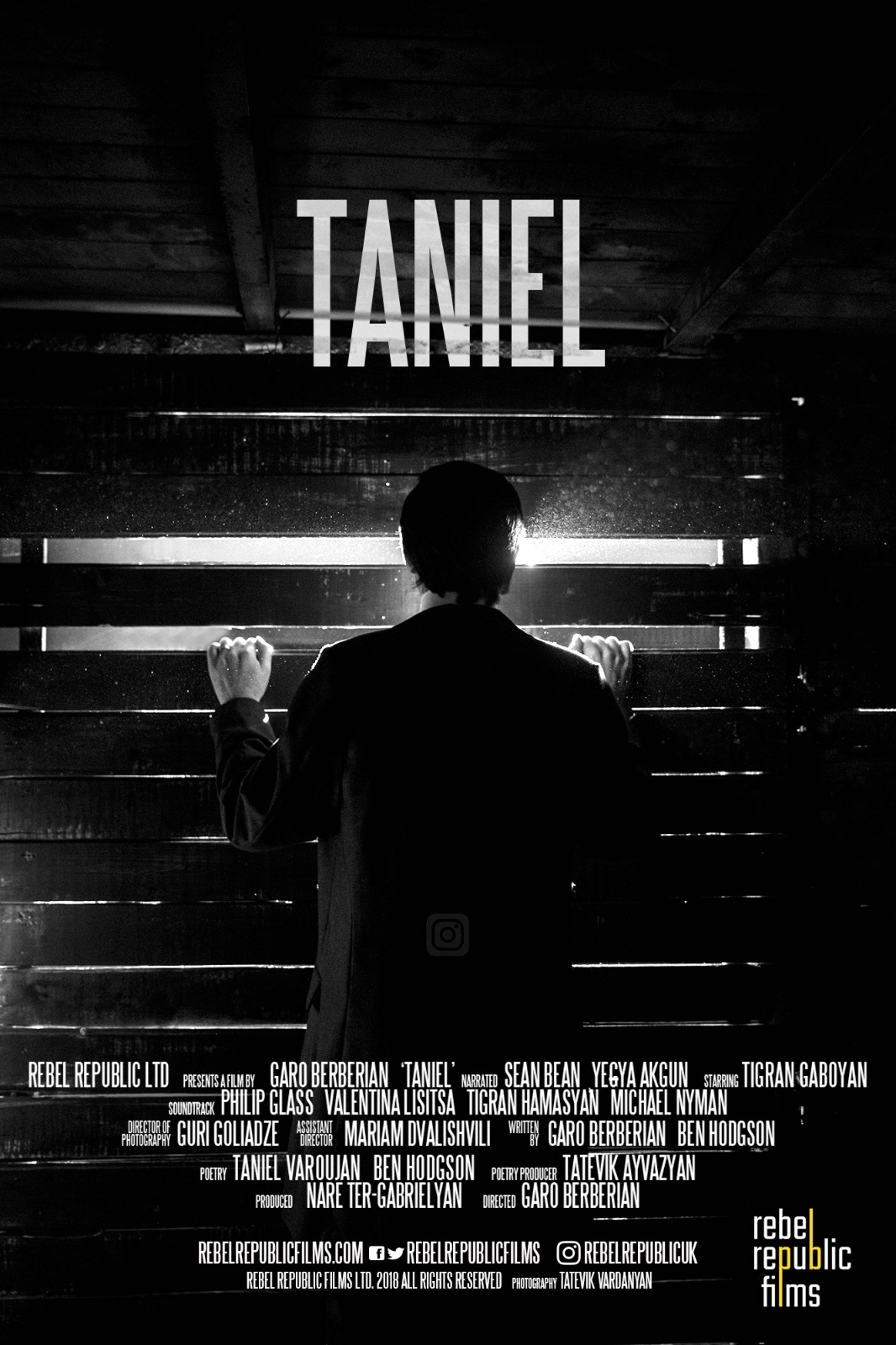
- Directed by: Garo Berberian
- Screenplay by: Garo Berberian, Ben Hodgson
- Produced by: Nare Ter-Gabrielyan, Tatevik Ayvazyan
- Starring: Tigran Gaboyan, Yegya Akgun, Shoghakat MLKE-Galstyan
- Narrated by: Sean Bean
- Cinematography: Guri Goliadze, Ben Hodgson
- Music by: Tigran Hamasyan, Philip Glass, Michael Nyman
- Production company: Rebel Republic Films
- Release date: March 23, 2018 (Bermuda)
- Running time: 20 minutes
- Countries: UK, Armenia
- Language: English / Western Armenian

Taniel (Armenian: "Դանիէլ") is a 2018 arthouse short film co-written and directed Garo Berberian, telling the story of the last months of poet Taniel Varoujan until his murder during the Armenian genocide at the age of 31, the day of his son’s birth. The film is the first to deal with the story of a man considered to be one of Armenia’s greatest poets with international fame. The film is loosely based on the memoirs of Aram Andonian, a journalist arrested on the same day as Varoujan, on 24 April 1915, when some 250 Armenian intellectuals and community leaders were rounded up and deported in the first major event of the Armenian genocide.

The film takes an arthouse approach to the subject seen in film-noir with a narrative in poetry both with Varoujan’s now endangered Western Armenian language (according to Unesco classification) read by Yegya Akgun and Ben Hodgson’s English poem "Indelible", narrated by Sean Bean to critical acclaim. Philip Glass’s Glassworks played by Valentina Lisitsa, Michael Nyman’s Out of the Ruins, Jordi Savall’s Armenian Spirit and Tigran Hamasyan’s Luis I Luso form the soundtrack.

== Style ==
“Taniel” is filmed in Neo-noir style, influenced by the Film noir movement and the works of Orson Welles in Citizen Kane and Rouben Mamoulian in The Mark of Zorro. The narrative of the film is heard through poetry in two languages - with Varoujan's original poems in the now endangered Western Armenian dialect expressing and explaining the scenes delivered by Yegya Akgun; and writer Ben Hodgson's narrative poetry in English delivered by multi award winning actor Sean Bean. Film's emotive music by Philip Glass, Tigran Hamasyan, Michael Nyman and the others is an integral part of the story, complementing the visuals and poetry.

== Production ==
After his initial plans to film in Istanbul—the city where Varoujan lived and worked—were not achievable, production started in Gyumri, Armenia, with the majority of the cast from the Gyumri Drama Theater and at locations at Gyumri railway station, Vartanants Square, Hovhannes Shiraz House-Museum and the historic central district of the city. Additional scenes and the title sequence were filmed in the English city of Portsmouth and University of Portsmouth.

== Poetry ==
The film uses two strands of poetry, in Western Armenian and English. Varoujan's original poetry is recited by Yeğya Akgün in Western Armenian, accompanied by English subtitles, translated by Alice Stone Blackwell, Tatul Sonentz-Papazian, etc. Young Taniel Varoujan had witnessed Hamidian massacres as a child, which profoundly affected his poetry, and the film uses some of his works which were prophetic about the 1915 events. "Taniel"'s scenes are explained in the poet's rich, innovative Western Armenian, using poems from his various books about loss, love, exile and his yearning for peace for the mankind. The film concludes with an epilogue from "Nemesis" (Նեմեսիս), an epic poem from "The Heart of the Race"

Ո՛հ, ի՜նչ փոյթ կեանքը մեռնող,
Երբոր երազը կ’ապրի,
Երբոր երազն անմա՜հ է:

Translation:

What do we care life is dying,
When the dream is Living,
When the dream is Immortal.

The English poem, narrating the film, was written by Ben Hodgson and is called "Indelible". The poem is read by Sean Bean, and is "Ben’s reading of contemporary accounts of the actual events later to be depicted in the film". The dual language version of the film has Western Armenian subtitles for "Indelible".

The film and the Varoujan poems used in Taniel came to the National Poetry Library's librarian, poet Chris McCabe's attention during the library's Endangered Poetry Project in August 2018. Subsequently, when Chris McCabe was working on the anthology based on poems in endangered languages, he considered Varoujan's works and picked 'Alms' (Ողորմութիւն) to include among 50 other works. 'Poems from the Edge of Extinction'' anthology was announced in March 2019, and published in September 2019. Varoujan's poem is presented in both in Western Armenian and in English, with an introduction and background about the poet, his life, the language and style. The book was very well received, and was officially launched at London Literature Festival at Southbank Centre.

== Cast ==
- Sean Bean - Narrator
- Tigran Gaboyan - Taniel Varoujan
- Yegya Akgun - Voice of Taniel Varoujan
- Shoghakat MLké-Galstian - Araksi Varoujan
- Samvel Grigoryan - Bedri Bey

== Crew ==
- Garo Berberian - Director
- Garo Berberian, Ben Hodgson - Writers
- Nare Ter-Gabrielyan - Producer
- Guri Goliadze, Ben Hodgson - Director of Photography
- Mariam Dvalishvili - Assistant Director
- Garik Manukyan - Production Design
- Tatevik Ayvazyan - Poetry Producer
- Lorraine Want - Film Editor
- Jesse Hodgson - Illustrator
- Mark Coory - Animation Designer
- Richard Hinton - Foley Artist

== Awards and nominations ==
- 2018 — Bermuda International Film Festival: Outstanding Director (for Garo Berberian)
- 2018 — Bermuda International Film Festival: Audience Award
- 2018 — ARPA International Film Festival: Best Short Film
- 2019 — Avanca Film Festival: Don Quixote Special Mention Award
- 2019 — L'Age D'or International Arthouse Film Festival: Best Short Film| Best Poster | Special Mention for the trailer
- 2019 — Fresco International Film Festival: Special Mention
- 2019 — Monochrome Film Festival: Best Cinematography | Best Foreign Film
- 2019 — Cyprus International Film Festival: Best Short Direction
- 2019 — Art Visuals and Poetry Film Festival: International Audience Award

"Taniel" has been selected to screen and nominated at a number of international festivals in 2018, such as in Sydney, Toronto, Bucharest, Washington DC, etc. Among them were the biggest Armenian film festival, Golden Apricot; ScreenPlay Film Festival run by Shetland Arts, curated by Mark Kermode and Linda Ruth Williams and one of the oldest European Film Festivals at Montecatini. First festival of 2019 was SR Film Festival New York in March, followed by Buenos Aires, Avanca and Yerevan.

== Notable Cultural Screenings ==
- 17 July 2018 - Armenian Genocide Museum-Institute
- 16 November 2018 - Film Society of Lincoln Center with AGBU Performing Arts
- 19 April 2019 - Hrant Dink Foundation, Istanbul
- 3 May 2019 - Ghent University as a part of Programme of Armenian Studies' Daniel Varoujan Annual Lecture, with an inaugural lecture by Krikor Beledian
