= Schahan Berberian =

Schahan R. Berberian (Armenian: Շահան Ռ. Պէրպէրեան; 1 January 1891 – 9 October 1956) was an Armenian philosopher, composer, and psychologist.

== Biography ==
=== Early years ===
Berberian was born in Constantinople (now Istanbul, Turkey). Shortly thereafter, along with his parents Retheos and Zaruhi and his elder brother Onnig, Berberian moved to Geneva, Switzerland to escape the atrocities against the Armenians perpetrated by the Ottoman Sultan Abdul Hamid II from 1894 to 1896.

Returning to Constantinople, Berberian enrolled at the Berberian School, which had been founded by his father Reteos Berberian, in Kadıköy, a district on the Asian side of the city. At that time, he started taking private lessons on the violin, but soon quit playing the "insufferable instrument" (allegedly throwing it into the fireplace to burn it). Instead he took up piano lessons although this venture was also rather unsuccessful.

Berberian graduated in 1906. The first job of the fifteen-year-old young man was to teach literature and natural sciences at his alma mater but in 1908, he left for Paris where he studied at the Sorbonne and the Collège de France, taking classes in philosophy and metaphysics with Henri Bergson, psychology with Georges Dumas and sociology with Émile Durkheim, thus receiving a thorough education in the liberal arts and obtaining a diploma to teach philosophy. At the same time he was able to quench his deep love for music by attending concerts and teaching himself composition.

=== Professional career ===
==== Principal of Berberian School ====
In 1911, Berberian was obliged to return to Constantinople to become Principal of the Berberian School, and thus was unable to complete his doctoral thesis (entitled "The Pathological Method in Psychology"). In addition to his duties at the school, he became involved in the cultural life of the Armenian community in the city. During this period, he developed a close friendship with Komitas, spending long hours discussing with him various issues in the field of the arts.

In 1918, Schahan Berberian was selected to become the director of the Central Committee of the Armenian Teachers’ Union and was appointed a member of the Central Educational Council in 1919. He was also instrumental in the foundation—and later became the chairman—of the Armenian Art Center (Hayardun) in Constantinople. He contributed essays to Armenian newspapers in Constantinople, mostly to Vosdan (Den), and in 1922, along with Kegham Kavafian, Vahan Tekeyan, Hagop Oshagan and Gostan Zarian, he founded the monthly, Partsravank (Monastery-on-a-Hill), which was devoted to art and literature.

In 1921, he married Telli Sirakian. They had two sons, Ardavazt and Bared. Bared died as a young man at 20 years old in a motorcycle accident. Ardavazt Berberian after living in Jerusalem and Beyruth, moved to Paris with his wife (Paule), where he became a renowned painter and also extremely involved in Armenian culture. He had two sons named Vanik and Henri Schahan, and a daughter named Gariné.

Ardavazt died in Avignon at the age of 79, in August 2002.

==== 1920s ====
In the fall of 1922, the deteriorating political atmosphere in Turkey impelled him to leave for Europe once more and Berberian settled in Dresden, Germany, where he studied Choreography, in addition to pursuing his philosophical and aesthetic interests. In 1924, together with his older brother composer Onnig Berberian, he moved to Cairo, Egypt to relaunch the Berberian School. Strongly supported by Archbishop Torkom Koushagian of Egypt, the school became an intellectual center for the local Armenian community and remained open until 1934 when its shaky finances forced it to close its doors. In Cairo, Berberian and his long-time friend and colleague Hagop Oshagan establish two choral groups to further encourage involvement in the Armenian community: the Union of Armenian Art Lovers (1932–34) and the Berberian School Choir (1924–34).

==== 1930s ====
At the invitation of Abp. Koushagian – now the Patriarch of Jerusalem – he and his family along with Hagop Oshagan moved to the Patriarchate of St. James to teach at the Armenian Seminary there. His presence at the Seminary created much excitement and a cultural renaissance in the theological college was soon underway, fostered in part by the Armenian Cultural Union (1940–47) which he and Oshagan founded there.

==== 1940s and 1950s ====
After ten years of teaching in Jerusalem, in 1944 Berberian moved to the Catholicosate of Cilicia in Antelias, Lebanon to continue his vocation in education. Once again, he managed to create an atmosphere of educative curiosity and a passion for learning that left an indelible mark on the history of the Seminary.

Most of Berberian's compositions are written for solo voice with piano or vocal ensembles. These have only recently came more widely known thanks in no small part to the efforts of Abp. Torkom Manoogian, the present Patriarch of Jerusalem. According to Manoogian, the songs were "in my possession for some time. When Berberian visited the United States in 1949, he agreed to provide copies of his music, two songs at a time, clearly written and in final form. He did so for a while, but soon stopped. He also sent me new variations of some of the songs. I had in addition three different notebooks, copied from the composer's work by three of his students. It was from these that the rest of the songs were obtained." Fortunately, fifty of Berberian's songs were published in 1983 by St. Vartan Press in New York.

Most of Schahan Berberian's songs share a mystic lucidity and spaciousness, and a simple melodic line with minimal accompaniment – notes hanging in midair. They are fragile and laconic, the textual content always leading the recitative-like musical line.

Other Berberian manuscripts, including the incidental music to Oshagan's Sasuntsi Tavit (David of Sassoun) and four scenes from the opera Anush, are at the Library of the Jerusalem Patriarchate. In addition, his literary output comprises two unpublished volumes: Komitas vartabed—antsı yev kordzı (Komitas—His Life and Work," 1936) and Yergu zhamanagner (Two Lifetimes, 1943).

While on a summer vacation in Paris, visiting his son Ardavazt, Berberian fell ill and died there on 9 October 1956.

== Published works ==
=== Solo vocal ===
- Բարձրացում • Partsratsum (Ascent, 1940)
- Փափաք • Papak (Desire, 1919)
- Պոլիս • Bolis (Constantinople, 1925)
- Քու յիշատակդ • Ku hishadagt (Your Memory, 1921)
- Իւսկիւտար • Eusgeudar (Üsküdar, 1944)
- Կ՚անձրեւէ տղաս • Gantsreve dghas (It is Raining, My Son, 1921)
- Գիշերերգ • Kishererk (Nocturne, 1945)
- Աստուածածնին ու խաչին • Asdvadzadznin u khachin (The Assumption and the Cross, 1918)
- Հրաւէր լուսնի տակ • Hraver lusni dag (Invitation in the Moonlight)
- Դուն աղբիւրն ես • Tun aghpyurn es (You Are the Fountain, 1918)
- Գարուն բացուաւ • Karun patsvav (Spring Has Come)
- Հօյ Հելինէ • Hoy Heline (Hoy Heline)
- Արազին • Arazin (To the Araz River)
- Հովին երգը • Hovin yerkı (The Song of the Wind)
- Զարոյի երգը • Zaroyi yerkı (Zaro's Song)
- Կարօտի երգ • Garodi yerk (Song of Longing)
- Ես ունէի • Yes uneyi (My Pomegranate Tree)
- Ամպի փէշով • Ambi peshov (Draped in Mist)
- Ձմեռն անցաւ • Tsmern antsav (Winter Has Gone)
- Լուսաւորչի կանթեղը • Lusavorchi gantegh (The Enlightener's Lamp)
- Հասուն արտ • Hasun ard (Ripening Field, 1919)
- Առաջին ծիլեր • Arachin dziler (The Exploding Seeds, 1920)
- Գիւղիս ճամբան • Kyughis jampan (My Village Road)
- Գիշերն անուշ է • Kishern anush e (The Night Is Sweet, 1919)
- Սէրով, սէրով (With Love Wounded)
- Ահաւասիկ (I Keep Yearning)
- Թող դէմքդ տժգունի (Let Your Face Be Pale)
- Հսկում (Let Me Stay)
- Երգ երջանկութեան (Song of Joy, 1952)
- Անձրեւին հետ (With the Rain)
- Իրիկունն իջաւ (Night Descents, 1920)
- Ձեռագիր (Manuscript)
- Վարդանանց քայլերգ (March of Vartanank)
- Ովսաննա (Hosanna)
- Ալէլուիա (Alleluia, 1935)
- Այսօր տօն է (Ode to the Nativity)
- Ետեւէս եկուր (Follow Me)
- Մի՛ մերձենար յիս (Do Not Come Near)
- Անառակը (The Prodigal)
- Եկուր վիշտ (Come Sorrow)
- Օրերն անդարձ (Unreturning Days)
- Իղձ (Longing)
- Ջուրին վրայ (On the Water)

=== Choral ===
- Ազատութեան զանգ • Azadutyan zank (Bell of Liberty)
- Իմ Նազենիս • Im Nazenis (My Nazeni)
- Քրիստոս պատարագեալ • Krisdos badarakyal (Christ Is Sacrificed)
- Առաւօտ լուսոյ • Aravod luso (Morning of Light)
- Անդնդային • Antntayin (Ode to the Holy Spirit)
- Խաչը • Khachı (The cross)
