= Hranush Arshagian =

Armenian poet

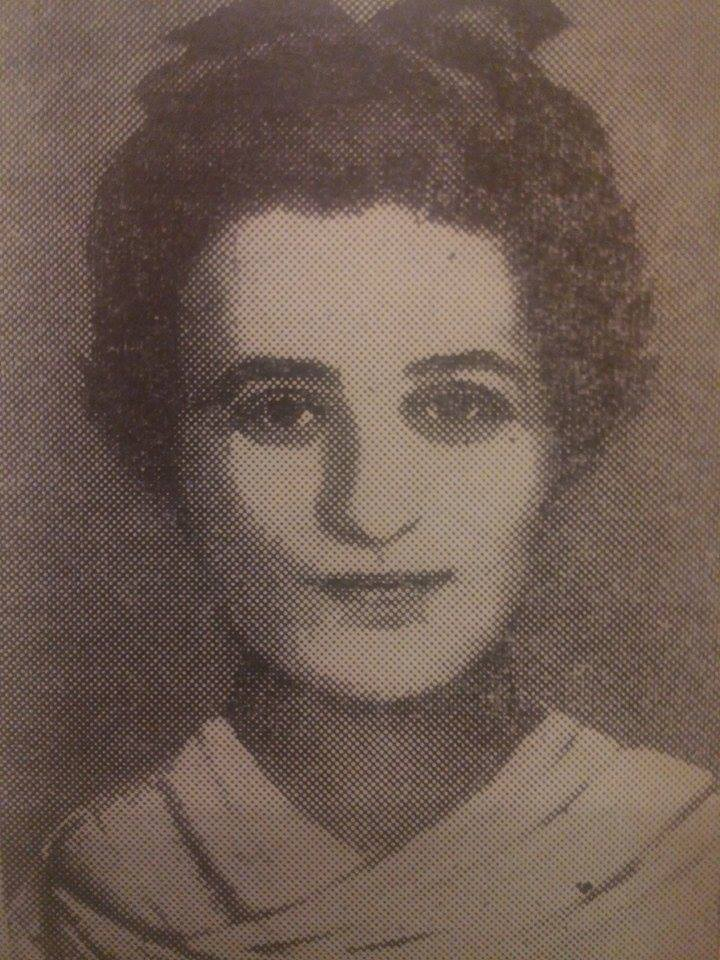

Heranush (Nargiz) Arshagian (Armenian: Հերանուշ (Նարգիզ) Արշակեան; July 28, 1887 in Constantinople, Ottoman Turkey – 1905 in Constantinople, Ottoman Empire) was an Ottoman Armenian poet.

== Life ==
Heranush Arshagian was born in the Beşiktaş district of Constantinople in 1887. Her father Hagop, who died when she was 3, was a prominent social activist in the Armenian community. When Arshagian turned 10 years old, she entered the Bakırköy French girls school. After studying there for a year and a half, Arshagian continued her studies at the Makruhian Armenian School in the Beşiktaş district. Arshagian's teachers were highly impressed by her essays and writings, but her days as a student were interrupted when her doctors suggested that she lived outside of the city. Arshagian moved to a farm on the outskirts of Yedikule, where she derived inspiration from the natural setting. It was during those years that Arshagian began to write poetry. She writes in her memoirs, "The fields are green. Afar I can see Constantinople with her ever-flowing suburbs. Beyond that are the hills and mountains covered in fog and the Marmara sea so very beautiful, so very trembling under the fiery rays of the sun..."

Arshagian died in 1905 at the age of 18.

== Poetry ==
She wrote a series of lyrical poems, novels, and short stories which were published after the author's death in Hayganush Mark's Tsaghig (Flower) newspaper. In 1910 Hrand Nazariantz, who was in constant contact with Heranush Arshagian, published a book about her life and works in Constantinople.

== Translation ==
- "Poems"
- "Letters to Hrand Nazariantz"
