= Tsolak Mlke-Galstyan =

Armenian dancer

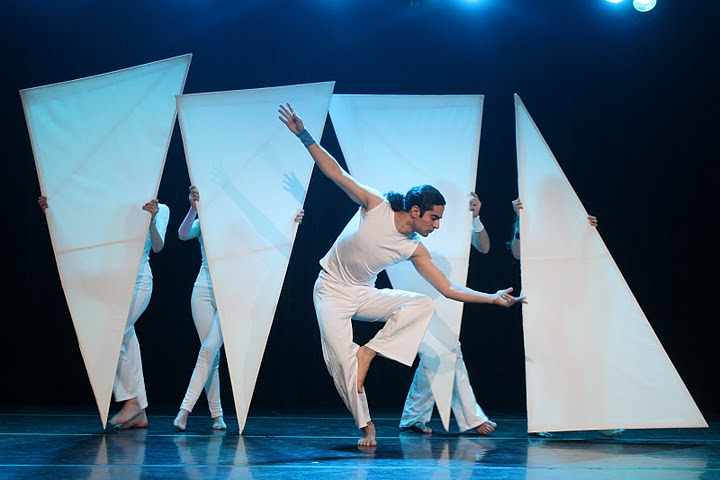
- Tsolak Mlke-Galstyan performing in "Dreams in Dreams"
- Born: February 25, 1984 (age 41); Yerevan, Armenian SSR, USSR
- Education: State Academy of Fine Arts of Armenia
- Career
- Current group: MIHR
- Dances: Latin, Ballet, Contemporary

Tsolak Mlke-Galstyan (Armenian: Ցոլակ Մլքե-Գալստյան, born February 25, 1984, Yerevan, Armenian SSR) is an Armenian dancer, stage actor, choreographer, and stage manager. He is the co-founder and art director of MIHR Theatre.

Tsolak Mlke-Galstyan is a graduate of State Academy of Fine Arts of Armenia. He was an apprentice of Riga-based dancer and director Modris Tenisons.

At the age of 16, Mlke-Galstyan was in car accident which left him paralyzed for some time. That pushed him to find dance techniques which need less movement and more of soul expression. In 2003, together with his sister Shoghakat Mlke-Galstyan he founded the MIHR contemporary dance company. It is the first contemporary dance theatre in Armenia. MIHR theatre has staged more than 20 performances worldwide. The most notable of its works are "Lavash", "Colors", "Ten Commandments of Komitas", "Dreams in Dreams", "Black Castle" and "Soldiers". It is collaborating with Armenia-based and foreign theatre and dance groups, organizing benefit performances.
