= Renato Fondi =

Italian poet

Renato Fondi (1887–1929) was an Italian poet, writer and music critic.

Fondi was born in Pistoia. He was active in the city until the years of the First World War, and was President of the choral society Theodule Mabellini. He contributed to the emergence of Giovanni Michelucci, brilliant architect and urban planner, and the whimsical Marino Marini. He founded the magazines Athena and La Tempra to which they collaborated some of the most influential writers and musicians of the time: Giovanni Papini, Dino Campana, Giuseppe Antonio Borgese, Ildebrando Pizzetti and the Armenian poet Hrand Nazariantz.

His works include three important essays on the epigrammatist Nicolas Chamfort, on Giovanni Papini and on Ildebrando Pizzetti.

Fondi wrote a monograph, in 1927, about Alfredo Catalani, a composer from Lucca. Catalani, who died in 1893, had not previously been studied. Fondi himself died in Rome of the same disease as Catalani, tuberculosis.

== Published works ==
- Musa vernacola (1907)
- Il sudario (1910)
- Ozi vesperali (1912)
- Chamfort (1916)
- Ildebrando Pizzetti e il dramma musicale italiano d'oggi (1919)
- Fiordelmondo (1919)
- Opuscoli filosofici (1919)
- Un costruttore: Giovanni Papini (1922)
