= Kegham Parseghian =

Kegham Parseghian Գեղամ Բարսեղեան
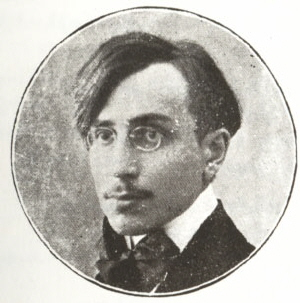
- Born: 1883; Constantinople, Ottoman Turkey
- Died: 1915 (aged 31–32); Ayaş, Ottoman Turkey
- Occupations: Journalist, writer, teacher, and political activist.

Kegham Parseghian (Գեղամ Բարսեղեան) (1883 – 1915), was an Armenian writer, teacher, editor, and journalist.

== Biography ==
Kegham Parseghian was born in the Gedik Paşa district of Constantinople. He attended the local Mesrobian school and continued his studies at the Getronagan Varjaran (Central Lyceum) until 1896. After spending a year in Paris, he published his first literary pieces in Armenian periodicals and newspapers of the time. Then he became a chief columnist and editor of the newspapers Surhantag (Սուրհանդակ) and Azatamart (Ազատամարտ, 1909–1915). He was one of the editors of the literary review Aztag (Ազդակ, 1908–1909). He was one of the founding members of the short lived literary monthly Mehian (Մեհեան, 1914) and worked along famed writers such as Gostan Zarian, Daniel Varujan, Hagop Oshagan, Hrand Nazariantz and Aharon Dadurian.

A complete collection of his works was published in 1931 by the Society of Friends of Martyred Writers in Paris.

During the Armenian genocide, on 24 April 1915, Parseghian was apprehended and taken to Ayaş near Ankara where he was killed.
