= Gostan Zarian =

Armenian writer (1885–1969)

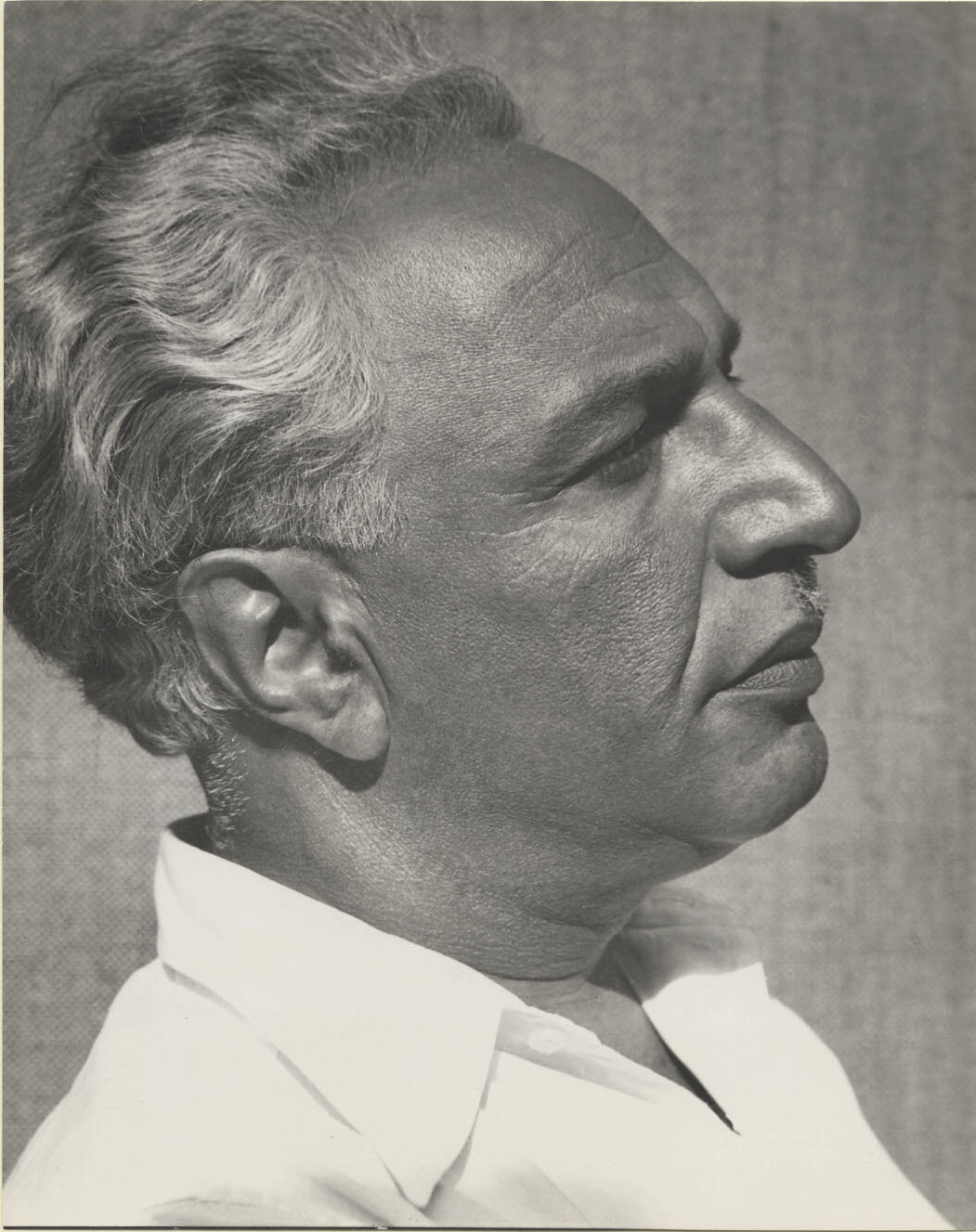
Portrait of Gostan Zarian from 1934

Constant, or Kostan Zarian (Armenian: Կոստան Զարեան; February 8, 1885 – December 11, 1969) was an Armenian writer who produced short lyric poems, long narrative poems of an epic cast, manifestos, essays, travel impressions, criticism, and fiction. The genre in which he excelled, however, was the diary form with long autobiographical divagations, reminiscences and impressions of people and places, interspersed with literary, philosophical and historical meditations and polemics.

== Early years ==
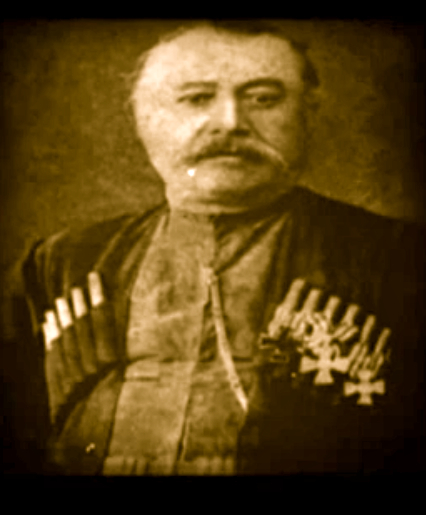
Christopher Yeghiazarov, Zarian's father

Kostandin Yeghiazarian was born in 1885 in Shamakhi (modern-day Azerbaijan). Through his mother, he was first cousins with the author Alexander Shirvanzade and the actor Hovhannes Abelian. His father, Christopher Yeghiazarov, was a prosperous general in the Russian Army, "a strong man, profoundly Christian and Armenian," who spent most of his life fighting in the mountains of the Caucasus. He died when Zarian was four years old, which prompted his family to move to Baku. He was then separated from his mother and placed with a Russian family, who enrolled him in a Russian gymnasium.

After attending the Russian Gymnasium of Baku, in 1895, when he was ten, he was sent to the College of Saint Germain in Asnières, near Paris. He continued his studies in Belgium, and, after obtaining a doctorate in literature and philosophy from the Free University (Université libre) of Brussels, he spent about a year writing and publishing verse in both French and Russian, delivering lectures on Russian literature and drama, and living a more or less bohemian life among writers and artists. Zarian became involved in the Russian Social Democratic Party, where he became personally acquainted with Vladimir Lenin. After 1909, he was a political exile in Europe, as the tsarist government had reportedly banned his return to the Caucasus because of his revolutionary activities, for which he spent a year and a half in a German jail (1907–08). He published a few poems in Russian in the revolutionary magazine Raduga and contributed to Belgian publications with prose, poems and critical essays in French. Speaking of this period in his life, Zarian wrote: "We used to have cheap food with Lenin in a small restaurant in Geneva, and today, a syphilitic boozer with his feet on a chair and hand on revolver is telling me: 'You counter-revolutionary fanatic nationalist Armenian intellectuals are in no position to understand Lenin.'" In addition to Lenin, Zarian also met and befriended such poets, artists, and political thinkers as Guillaume Apollinaire, Pablo Picasso, Georgi Plekhanov, Giuseppe Ungaretti, Louis-Ferdinand Céline, Paul Éluard, Fernand Léger, as well as the Belgian poet and literary critic Emile Verhaeren. It was Verhaeren who advised him to study his own mother tongue and write in the language of his ancestors if he wanted to reveal his true self. Heeding his advice, Zarian studied Classical Armenian and Modern Armenian with the Mekhitarists on the island of San Lazzaro degli Armeni in Venice (1910–1912), where he also published Three Songs (1915), a book of poems in Italian (originally written in Armenian), one of which, titled La Primavera (Spring), was set to music by Ottorino Respighi and first performed in 1923.

Young Gostan Zarian

Zarian then moved to Constantinople, which was then the most important cultural center of the Armenian diaspora, though he often travelled between Venice and Constantinople. During such a trip, when leaving Constantinople on the ship S.S. Montenegro in 1912, he met his future wife Takuhi (Rachel) Shahnazarian and married her in Venice on December 4, 1912, before returning to Constantinople with her two months later. In 1914, together with Daniel Varoujan, Hagop Oshagan, Kegham Parseghian, and Aharon Dadourian, he founded the literary periodical Mehian, which means pagan temple in Armenian. This constellation of young firebrands became known as the Mehian writers, and like their contemporaries in Europe—the French surrealists, Italian futurists, and German expressionists—they defied the establishment, fighting against ossified traditions and preparing the way for the new. "In distant cities people argued and fought around our ideas," wrote Zarian, "ignorant school principals had banned our periodical. Well-known scholars looked upon us with suspicion. They hated us but did not dare to say anything openly. We were close to victory..." The tone of the publications in Mehian was politically, aesthetically and religiously radical, with a strong influence from German philology—with Zarian specifically advocating an anti-Semitic idea that was present in many of his later works of fiction: that Armenians were an Aryan people who needed to overcome the Semite within themselves.

A year later, the Young Turk government decided to exterminate the entire Armenian population of Turkey. The Armenian genocide that followed claimed 1–1.5 million victims, among them 200 of the most prominent Armenian poets and authors, including two of the Mehian writers, Varoujan and Parseghian. Zarian was able to escape to Bulgaria before the closing of the borders in November 1914, and then to Italy, establishing himself in Rome and later in Florence.

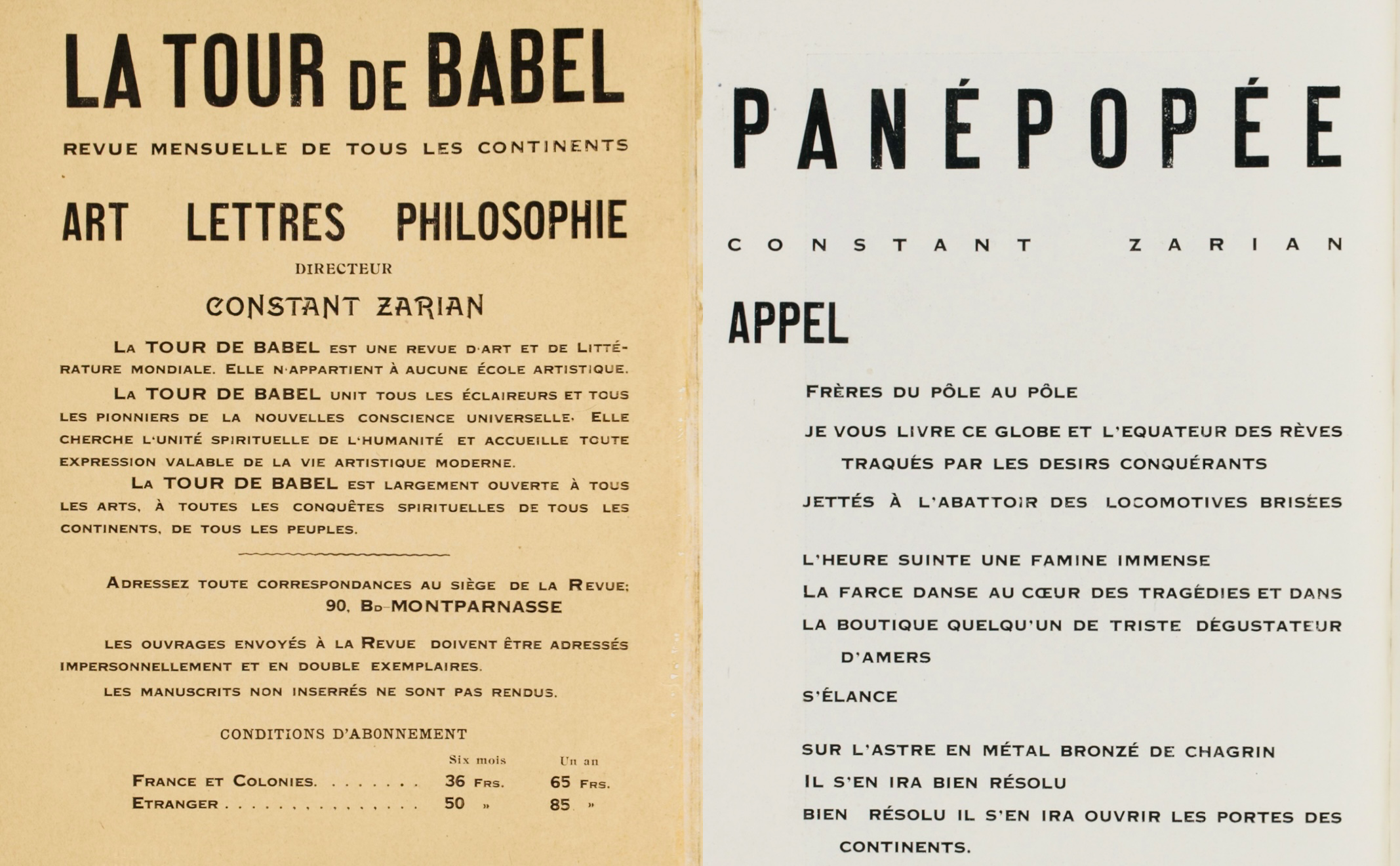
Issue of La Tour de Babel

In 1919, as a special correspondent to an Italian newspaper, he was sent to the Middle East and Armenia. He returned to Constantinople in late 1921 and there, together with Vahan Tekeyan, Hagop Oshagan, Schahan Berberian, and Kegham Kavafian, he founded another literary periodical, Partsravank (Monastery-on-a-Hill), in 1922. He also published a second book of poems, The Crown of Days (Istanbul, 1922).

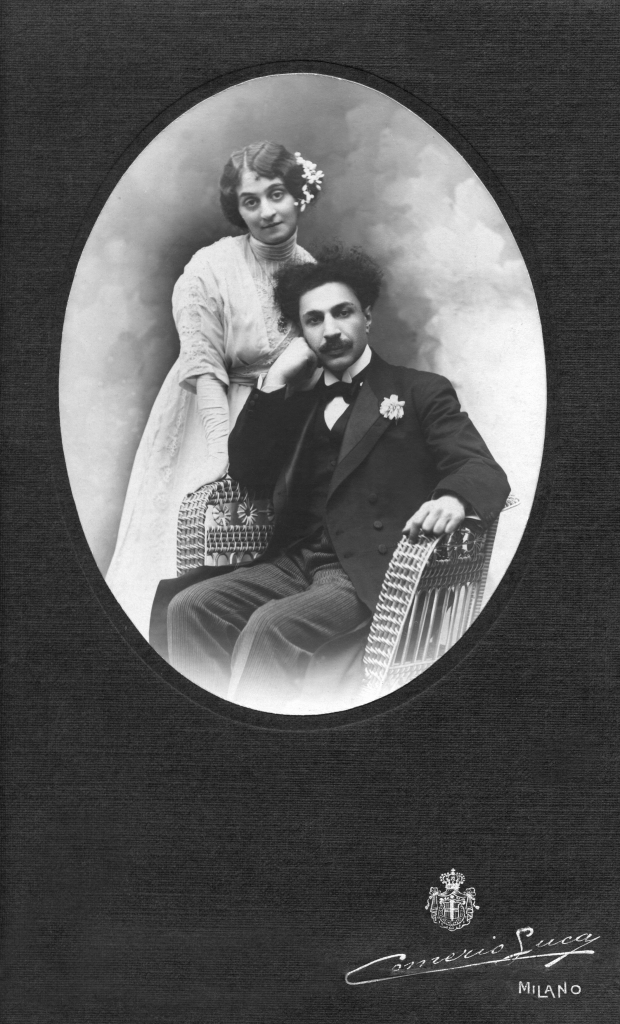
Gostan Zarian and his wife Takuhi Shahnazarian in Milan.

== Later years ==
Following the establishment of Soviet rule in Armenia, Zarian moved there and taught comparative literature at the Yerevan State University from 1922 to 1924. Thoroughly disappointed with the Soviet state, in 1924 he again went abroad where he conducted a nomadic existence, living in Paris (where he founded the short-lived French-language periodical La tour de Babel), Rome, Florence, the Greek island of Corfu, the Italian island of Ischia, and New York City. On August 31, 1934, he married his second wife, the American artist Frances Brooks. In New York he taught the history of Armenian culture at Columbia University and edited the English-language periodical The Armenian Quarterly (1946) which lasted only two issues, but was the first Armenian studies journal in the United States and published the work of such scholars as Sirarpie Der Nersessian, Henri Grégoire, Giuliano Bonfante, and writers such as Marietta Shaginyan. From 1952 to 1954 he taught history of art at the American University of Beirut (Lebanon). Following an interlude in Vienna and Rapallo, he taught at Berkeley.

== Friendship with Lawrence Durrell ==
The British author Lawrence Durrell and Zarian were friends for many years, exchanging letters between 1937 and 1951 (only twenty-five written by Durrell still exist) in which Durrell addressed Zarian as "Dear Master" and "Chère Maître," and spending time together in Greece and Italy (1937–54), Corfu (1937), Ischia (1950) and Cyprus (1954). They shared a fascination with classical Greek culture and the felt need for an existential reconnection to it via Hellenic culture and geography, self-realization through physical health and spiritual integration. In 1952, Durrell wrote an essay entitled Constant Zarian: Triple Exile in the magazine The Poetry Review in which he wrote that:

It was no conscious choice that made Zarian a classical man—it was the development of a natural style of mind, founded in bitter experience and in a tenacious belief that if man was to be saved from destruction he stood in need of major artists of a new type—responsible men. His own task was no longer to reject, to criticize, to whine—but in the deepest sense of the word, to submerge in the swift currents of history and to give their impulse direction and form. "To endure and contribute"—that was the new motto: and he had never deviated by a hairsbreadth from it in his attitude to his work and his people. He was now a triple exile: exiled by both Czarist and Bolshevik; and doubly exiled from the current of European thought by his choice of language.

In a 1950 poem, Durrell describes Zarian in Ischia:

We came originally here to see
A character from Prospero called C.
(It stands for Constant) Zarian,
Then wild and roguish literary man
Who with his painter wife lives on this island,
A life romantic as one could in…Thailand.
Together we tasted every wine,
Most of the girls (I mean the Muses Nine)
And some small favours accident affords
To such poor chaps as we—as deal in words

You get here by super motor-launch
Crowded with chattering girls from Naples O
Such animation such colossal brio
It makes one feel much younger just to see,
At least so Zarian says. (He's sixty-three)
He scales a mountain like a wild chamois
Despite a certain—bulk—avoirdupois
And swears Per Baccho loud as any peasant:
Together we've enjoyed a very pleasant
Month of mad cookery and writing talk,
Such food, such wine—a wonder we can walk.

== Final years ==
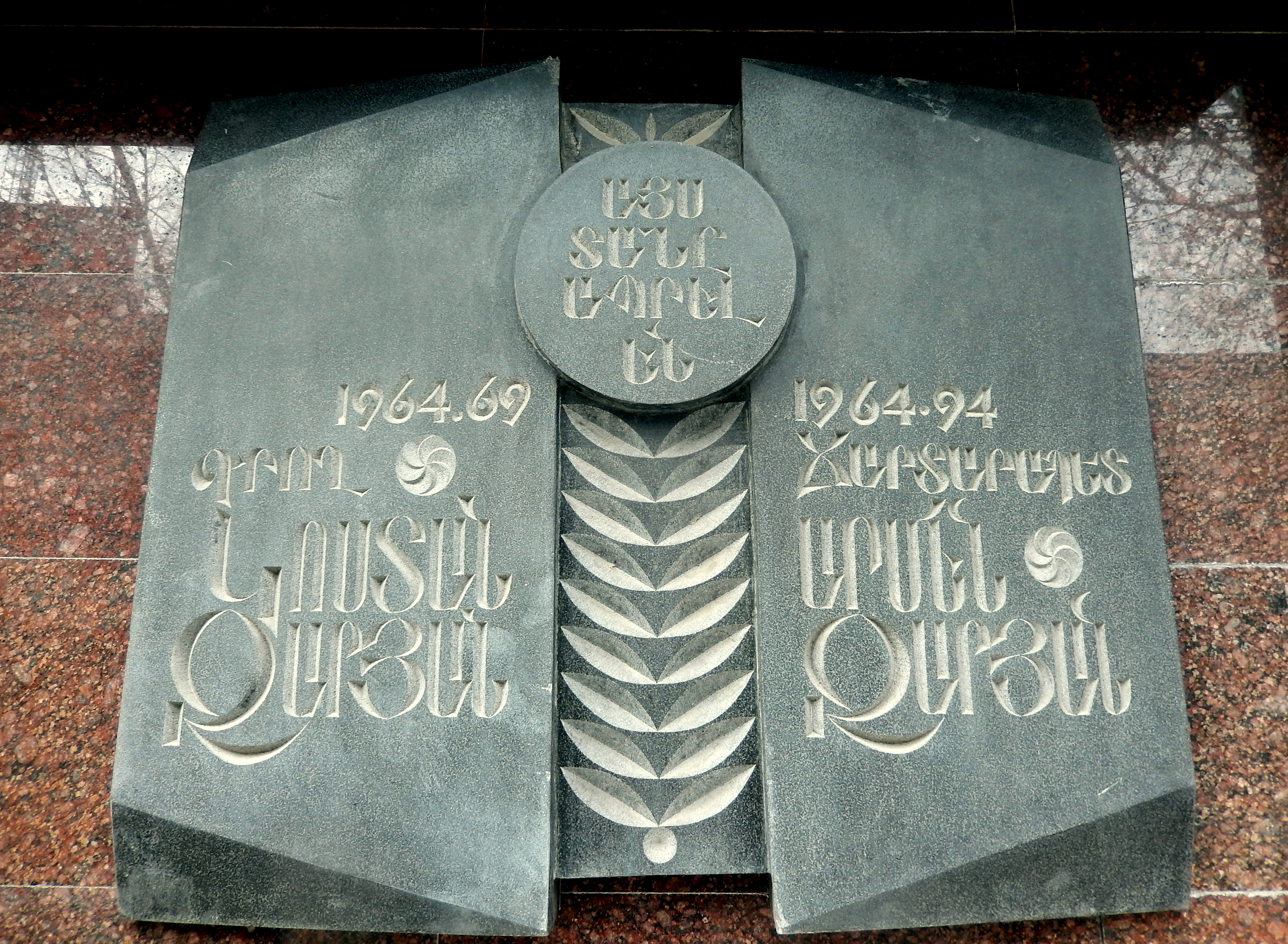
Memorial Plaque in Yerevan

While teaching at UC Berkeley, Zarian was visited by the Catholicos of All Armenians Vazgen I, who asked him to return to Armenia after many years of exile. In 1963 Zarian once more returned to Soviet Armenia where he worked at the Charents Museum of Literature and Arts in Yerevan. He died in Yerevan on December 11, 1969, leaving behind three children from his first marriage, Vahe, Armen, and Nevart Zarian, and a son from his second marriage, Hovan Zarian.

== Selected works ==
- Three Songs (1916)
- Crown of Days (1922)
- The Traveler and His Road (1926–28)
- West (1928–29)
- Cities (1930)
- The Bride of Tetrachoma (1930)
- Bancoop and the Bones of the Mammoth (1931–34)
- Countries and Gods (1935–38)
- The Ship on the Mountain (1943)
- The Island and a Man (1955)
