= Daniel Varoujan =

Armenian poet

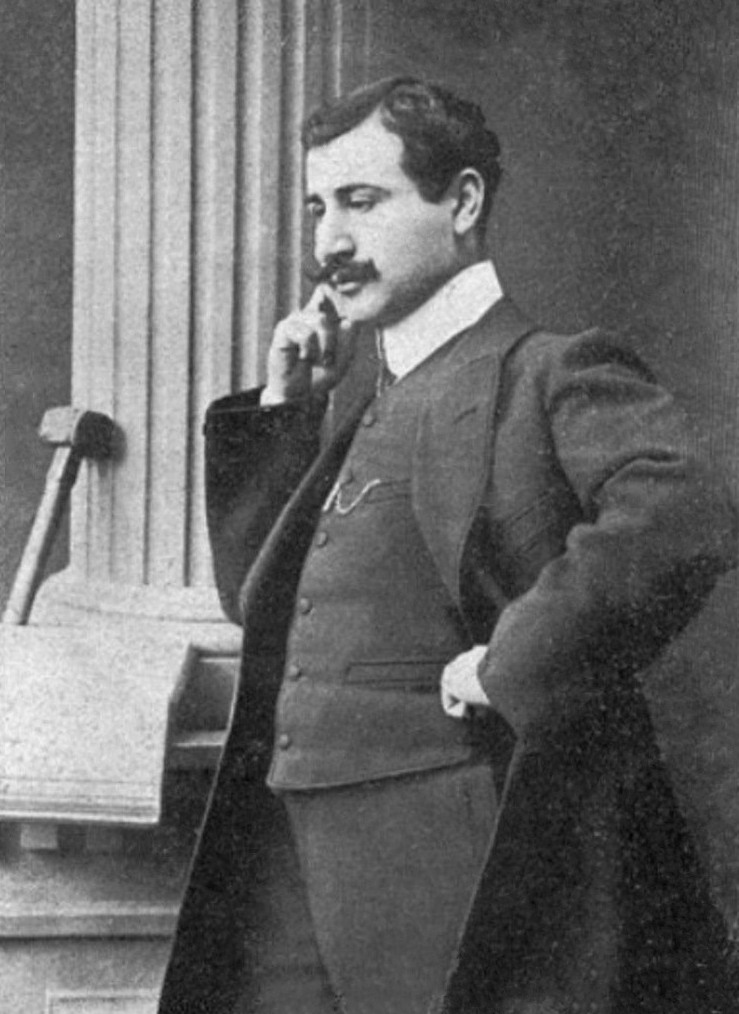
- Born: 20 April 1884; Brgnik village, Vilayet of Sivas, Ottoman Empire
- Died: 26 August 1915 (aged 31); Cankiri, Vilayet of Kastamonu, Ottoman Empire
- Citizenship: Ottoman
- Education: University of Ghent
- Occupation: Poet
- Spouse: Araksi Varoujan

Daniel Varoujan (Note: Also transliterated as Taniel Varuzhan, Tanyel Varujan and Daniel Varuzhan.) (Armenian: Դանիէլ Վարուժան, 20 April 1884 – 26 August 1915) was an Armenian poet of the early 20th century. At the age of 31, when he was reaching international stature, he was deported and murdered by the Young Turk government, as part of the officially planned and executed Armenian genocide.

== Life and education ==
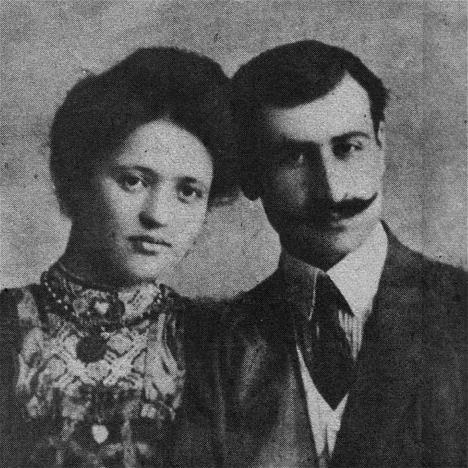
Daniel and his wife Araksi

Varoujan was born Daniel Tchboukkiarian (Դանիէլ Չպուքքեարեան) in the village of Prknig (now called Çayboyu) near the town of Sivas in Turkey. After attending the local school, he was sent in 1896, the year of the Hamidian massacres, to Istanbul, where he attended the Mkhitarian school. He then continued his education at the Moorat-Raphael College in Venice, and in 1905 entered Ghent University in Belgium, where he followed courses in literature, sociology and economics. In 1909 he returned to his village where he taught for three years. After his marriage with Araksi Varoujan in 1912, he became the principal of St. Gregory The Illuminator School in Constantinople.

== Mehean literary group ==
In 1914, he established the Mehean (Note: Also transliterated as Mehian and Mehyan.) literary group and magazine with Gostan Zarian, Hagop Oshagan, Aharon Dadourian and Kegham Parseghian. The movement aimed to start an Armenian literary and artistic renaissance. Participants saw as their purpose creating a "center", a temple of Art which, according to their manifesto, would attract a fragmented and spiritually scattered nation in order to promote its artistic creativity. Heavily influenced by Nietzschean ideas, they struggled, however, to reconcile two opposing directions in their understanding of ends and means, that is, between art as means to find a "center" for the nation, or centering the nation as a means to achieving meaningful and universal artistic creation, the latter being Varoujan's position.

The fundamental ideology of Mehean was expressed in the following excerpt of their manifesto on the importance of recreating a genuinely autochthonous creative "spirit" in Armenian literature:

We announce the worship and the expression of the Armenian spirit, because the Armenian spirit is alive, but appears only occasionally. We say: Without the Armenian spirit there is no Armenian literature and no Armenian artist. Every true artist expresses only his own race's spirit...

== Death ==
According to Grigoris Balakian, who saw the victims in Chankiri on the day of their departure and later talked with their Turkish carriage drivers, Varoujan and four other detainees were being transferred from Chankiri to Ankara when their carriage was intercepted at a place called Tiuna. At that location, beside a stream, they were murdered by four Kurds headed by a local criminal named Halo acting under the instructions of members of the Ittihadist committee in Chankiri. The senior of the two escorting policemen was aware of the committee's plan and allowed them to be taken off the carriage. After the murders, the Kurds divided the clothing and possessions of the victims among themselves and the policemen.

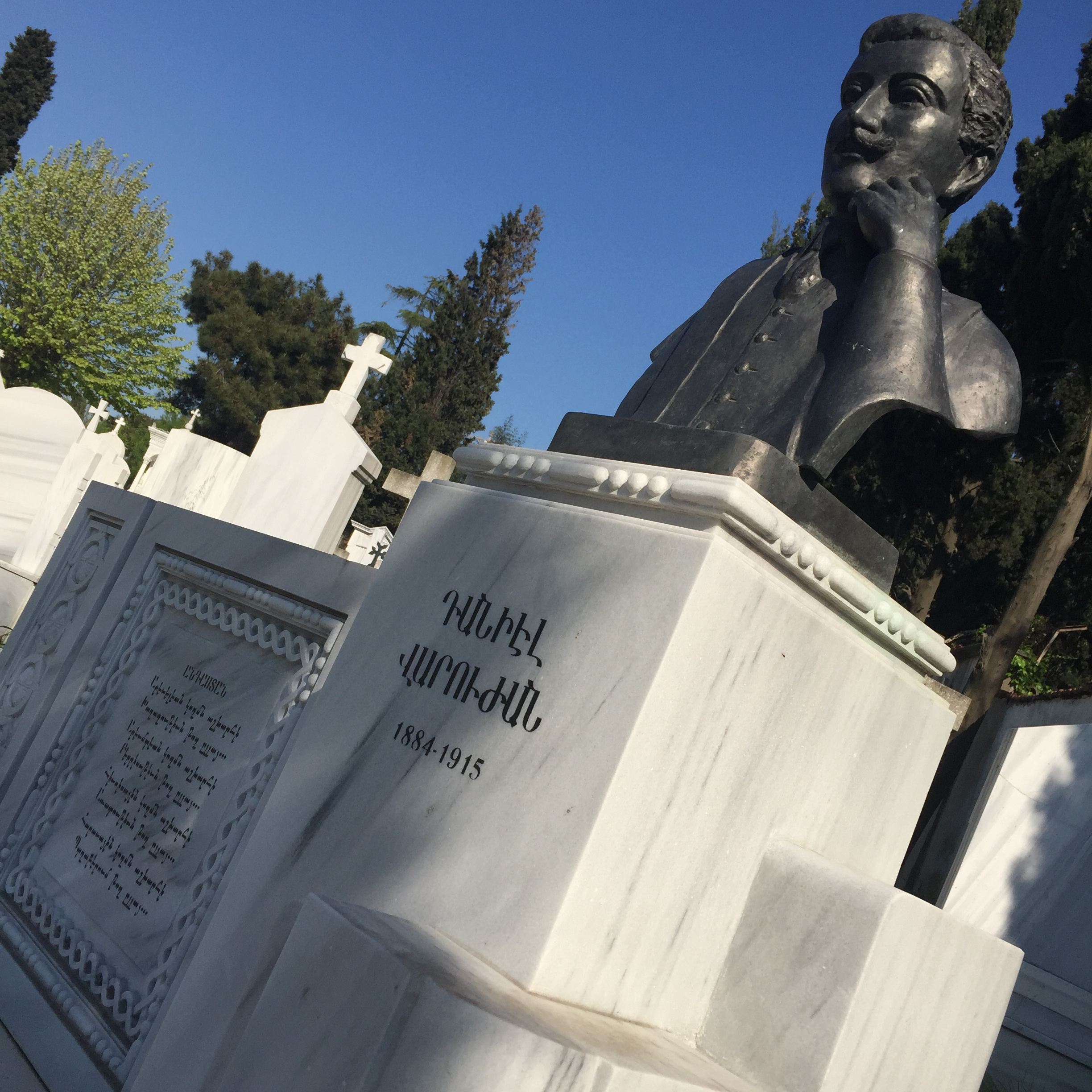
Daniel Varoujan memorial at the Şişli Armenian Cemetery of Istanbul

The Armenian writer and doctor Roupen Sevag and three other eyewitnesses described the torture and death of Varoujan. After being arrested and jailed, they were told that they were being taken to a village. On the way, a Turkish official and his assistant, accompanied by five heavily armed "policemen", stopped the convoy. After robbing the five prisoners, the first two who were in charge left and ordered the other five to take them away. After taking them to the woods, they attacked the prisoners, took off their clothes until all of them were left naked. Then they tied them one by one to the trees and started cutting them slowly with knives. Their screams could be heard by witnesses in hiding from a long distance.

One of Varoujan's major works was The Song of the Bread (Հացին երգը) a fifty-page collection of poems. Confiscated during the genocide, it was an unfinished manuscript at the time of his death. Reportedly saved by bribing Turkish officials.

The Song of the Bread was published posthumously in 1921. The poems celebrate the simple majesty of village agricultural life led by Armenian peasant farmers.

More than anyone else of their time, Siamanto and Varoujan verbalized the hopes of the Armenians around the start of the 20th century. They used legends, old epics, and pagan mythology as a springboard for their work.

== In popular culture ==
=== Films ===
Varoujan's last months, starting from his arrest to death, were portrayed in an award-winning short arthouse film Taniel by British director Garo Berberian, narrated by Sean Bean.

== Bibliography ==
Varoujan produced four major volumes of poetry:

- Shivers (Սարսուռներ, 1906, Venice)
- The Heart of the Race (Ցեղին սիրտը, 1909, Constantinople)
- Pagan Songs (Հեթանոս երգեր, 1912, Constantinople)
- The Song of the Bread (Հացին երգը, 1921, Constantinople).

Other editions:

- Varoujan, Daniel. Le chant du pain (Marseilles: Editions Parentheses, 1990).
- Varujan, Daniel. Il canto del pane (Milan: Edizioni Angelo Guerini e Associati, 1992).
- Varuzhan, Daniel. Արծիւներու կարավանը (Erevan: "Hayastan" Hratarakchutyun, 1969).
- Բանաստեղծական երկեր (Antelias: Tp. Kilikioy Katoghikosutean, 1986).
- Բանաստեղծություններ (Erevan: Haypethrat, 1955).
- Ձօն (Erevan: Hayastan Hratarakchutyun, 1975).
- Երկեր (Erevan: "Hayastan," 1969).
- Երկեր (Jerusalem: "Haralez Hratarakchutiwn," 1973).
- Երկեր (Erevan: "Sovetakan Grogh" Hratarakchutyun, 1984).
- Երկերի լիակատար ժողովածու երեք հատորով (Erevan: Haykakan SSH GA Hratarakchutyun, 1986, 1987).
- Հարճը (Erevan: Haypethrat, 1946).
- Հարճը (Beirut: Tparan Etvan, 1952).
- Հարճը (Erevan: "Sovetakan Grogh" Hratarakchutyun, 1977).
- Հատընտիր (Istanbul: Grakan Akumb-Zhamanak Gortsaktsutiwn, 1994).
- Հատընտիրներ (Istanbul: Zhamanak, 1994).
- Հացին երգը (Jerusalem: Tparan Srbots Hakobeants, 1950).
- Հացին երգը (Erevan: Haypethrat, 1964).
- Հացին երգը (Constantinople: O. Arzuman, 1921).
- Հեթանոս երգեր (Ghalatia [Constantinople]: Tpagrutiwn "Shant," 1912).
- Հեթանոս երգեր (Jerusalem: Tparan Srbots Hakobeants, 1953).
- Հեթանոս երգեր. Հացին երգը. հատուածներ (Venice-S. Ghazar: Mkhitarean hratarakutiwn, 1981).
- Նամականի (Erevan: Haypethrat, 1965).
- Poemes Varoujean (Beirut: Impr. Hamaskaine, 1972).
- Սարսուռներ ([Jerusalem:] Srbots Hakobeants, 1950).
- Սարսուռներ. Ցեղին սիրտը. հատուածներ (Venice-S. Ghazar: Mkhitarean hratarakutiwn, 1981).
- Stikhi (Moscow: Khudozhestvennaia lit-ra, 1984).
- Stikhi (Erevan: Izd-vo "Sovetakan Grogh," 1985).
- Ցեղին սիրտը (Constantinople: Hratarakutiwn Artsiw Zogh. Gravacharanotsi, 1909).
- Ցեղին սիրտը (Jerusalem: Tparan Srbots Hakobeants, 1953).
- Varoujean: poems (Beirut: Impr. Hamaskaine, n.d.).

About Varoujan:

- Esajanian, Levon. Դանիէլ Վարուժան (կեանքը եւ գործը) (Constantinople: Berberian, 1919).

== See also ==
- Armenian literature
- Armenian notables deported from the Ottoman capital in 1915
