= Berberian School =

- Armenian: Պէրպէրեան վարժարան

Information
- Established: 1876
- Founder: Reteos Berberian
- Closed: 1934

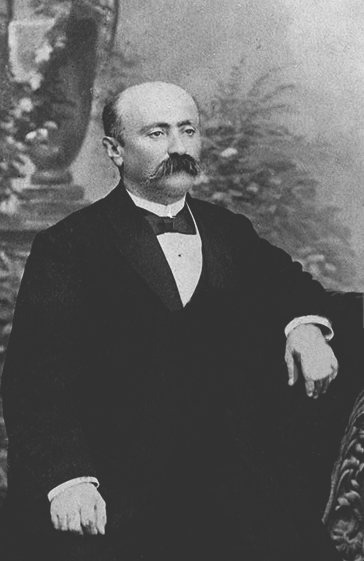
Reteos Berberian founder and director of Berberian School

The Berberian School or Berberian Varjaran (Armenian: Պէրպէրեան վարժարան) was an Armenian school. It was founded in Scutari, Constantinople in 1876 by Reteos Berberian. It was renowned for its high standards and it prepared students for entry in Europe's best universities.

The school's motto was pursuing what is "good, true and beautiful" [Philippians 4:8]. The curriculum and methodology of the school, shaped by Berberian himself, had the aim of imparting specific moral and spiritual values. The curriculum was later expanded to include foreign languages and social sciences.

Berberian was director of the school until his death in 1907. The next principals were Petros Karapetian (1907-1909), followed by Berberian's sons, Onnik (1909-1911) and Shahan (1911-1922). The school's operation was interrupted between 1914, and 1918 due to the First World War and the Armenian genocide.

Its attendees included Ruben Sevak, Shahan Shahnour, Hrand Nazariantz, Hovhannes Hintliyan, and Schahan Berberian, Berberian's son. In 1924 the school relocated to Cairo, Egypt, where it finally shut down in 1934 due to financial reasons.

== See also ==
- Education in the Ottoman Empire
