= Reteos Berberian =

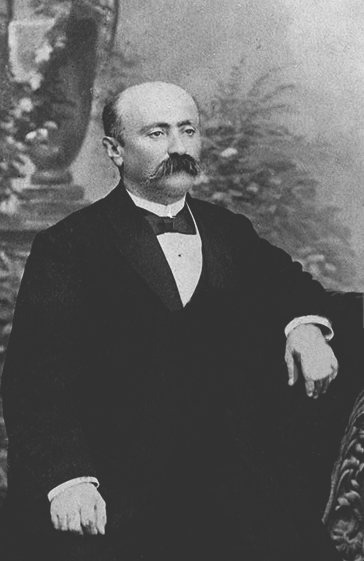
- Born: 1848; Hasköy, Constantinople, Ottoman Empire
- Died: 1907 (aged 58–59); Üsküdar, Ottoman Empire
- Occupations: Educator, pedagogue, principal, writer, poet
- Known for: Founder of the prestigious Armenian Berberian Varjaran school

Reteos Berberian, also known as Reteos Perperian (Armenian: Ռեթէոս Պէրպէրեան, 1848, Constantinople, Ottoman Empire – 1907, Üsküdar, Ottoman Empire), was an Ottoman Armenian educator, pedagogue, principal, writer, poet, and founder of the prestigious Armenian Berberian Varjaran school.
