= Oshakan (surname) =

Oshakan or Oshagan (Armenian: Օշական} is a surname. Notable people with the surname include:

- Hagop Oshagan (1883–1948), Armenian literary figure
- Vahé Oshagan (1922–2000), Armenian literary figure
