= Hamazkayin =

Armenian cultural and educational society

Hamazkayin Armenian Educational and Cultural Society
- Formation: 1928
- Type: NGO
- Parent organization: Armenian Revolutionary Federation
- Website: hamazkayin.com

The Hamazkayin Armenian Educational and Cultural Society (Armenian: Համազգային Հայ Կրթական եւ Մշակութային Միութիւն) is a major cultural organization of the Armenian Diaspora.

In addition to organizing cultural events in local Armenian communities, Hamazkayin runs three schools; publishes books through its printing press; maintains bookstores; publishes a monthly literary magazine, Pakin, organizes the Hamazkayin Forum and has established H-Pem of their Hamapem establishment. Hamazkayin is supported by a wide segment of the Armenian community and encourages active participation to the events sponsored by the community. Hamazkayin sponsors and organizes many cultural events, such as concerts by renowned artists, scientific seminars, film festivals, literary lectures and book reviews. In the United States, the Hamazkayin Armenian Educational and Cultural Society was established as a non-profit organization in 1970.

== History ==
The Hamazkayin ('All-National') Publishing and Cultural Society was founded on May 28, 1928, in Cairo, Egypt, by a group of nine Armenian intellectuals, including the writer and educator Levon Shant; historian, critic, and first minister of education of Armenia, Nigol Aghbalian; former prime minister of Armenia Hamo Ohanjanyan; revolutionary and militant Sophie Areshian, stage director and art critic Kasbar Ipegian; as well as Garabed and Drtad Malkhassian and Hagop Balekjian.

Subsequently, Hamazkayin chapters were founded throughout the Middle East, Europe, the United States, Canada, South America, Australia, and most recently in Armenia.

== Schools ==
- The Melankton & Haig Arslanian Djemaran in the East Beirut suburb of Antelias in Lebanon, founded in 1930.
- École Hamaskaïne in Marseille, France, founded in 1980.
- The Arshak & Sophie Galstaun College in Sydney, Australia, founded in 1986.
- Ecole Hamazkaïne-Tarkmantchatz in Issy-les-Moulineaux, a southwestern suburb of Paris, France, founded in 2015.

== Theatre ==
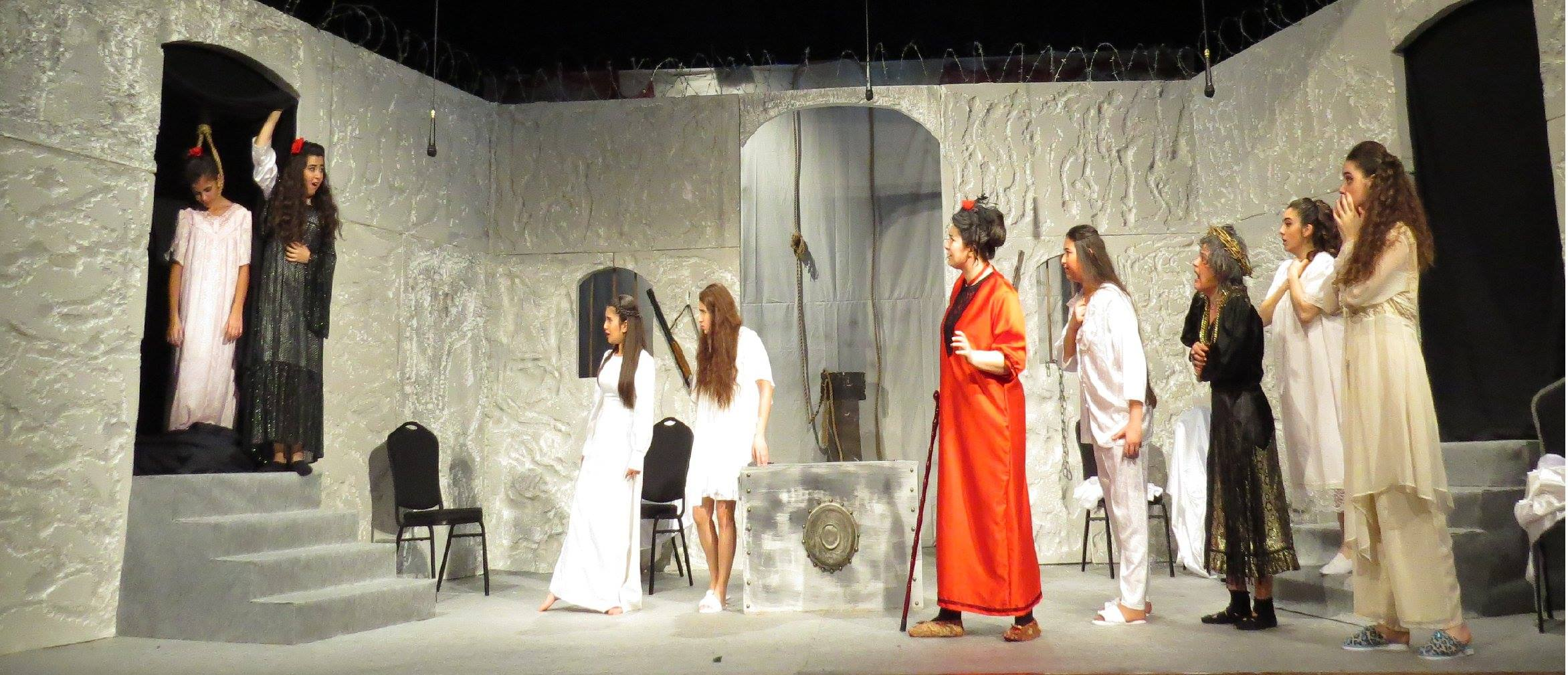
Hamazkayin’s “Arek” Theatre Troupe performing The House of Bernarda Alba

Hamazkayin's Saroyan Theatre was established in San Francisco in the 1980s under the direction of actress Marie Rose Abousefian.

== Publishing ==
Hamazkayin runs the Vahe Setian Printing Press in the Bourj Hammoud neighborhood of Beirut, Lebanon, along with the Hamazkayin Bookstore below it. It has also been publishing the monthly literary magazine Pakin (Բագին) since 1962.

== Hamazkayin Forum ==
Started in 1995, the Hamazkayin Forum is a 2-week cultural and educational trip for Armenian youth (mainly college-age students). From 1995 to 2001, the program was held at the Hamazkayin Nshan Palanjian educational institute in West Beirut, Lebanon. The 2002 forum featured one week in Lebanon and one week in Armenia. Since then, the forum has been held entirely in Armenia.

== H-Pem ==
H-Pem is a collaborative English-language Armenian cultural online platform and publication established by Hamapem of the Hamazkayin Armenian Educational and Cultural Society. In 2014, Hamazkayin's seventh General Assembly outlined the creation of an online platform to more effectively implement the organization's mission and reach Armenians in the diaspora—specifically the Diasporan Armenian youth. The project was named "H-Pem" by combining "H" for Hamazkayin, with "Pem", the Armenian word for "platform". Launched and made available to the public on May 13, 2019, H-Pem's mission is to reach Armenian communities around the world and help Armenians—particularly Armenian youth—(re)connect with their homeland and culture in new, creative, and cooperative ways.

=== Features ===
Most of the platform is open to the public. H-Pem's content is divided into two main parts: "Featured content," which features pieces written by contributors, and "Your stage," a space in which users' work are highlighted.

The "Featured content" portion of the platform is H-Pem's online magazine, which includes stories, interviews, analyses, and profiles of Armenian cultural figures and achievers, as well as stories in pictures.

"Your stage" is an experimental space, which includes a multimedia guide and a submissions area, aspiring and established artists are encouraged to introduce and share their creative output. "Your stage" also features a section for collaborations with artists, writers, cultural executives, students, and graduates from multiple disciplines, as well as organizations, institutions, and community members, on focused projects.

The platform also features a section, which live streams Armenian cultural events around the world.

== See also ==
- Nor Serount Cultural Association
- H-Pem
- Armenian Revolutionary Federation
