= Boghos Snabian =

Lebanese-Armenian writer and editor

- Պօղոս Սնապեան
- Born: 11 August 1927; Bitias, Musa Dagh, Sanjak of Alexandretta
- Died: 14 June 2014 (aged 86)
- Alma mater: Armenian Theological Seminary of Jerusalem
- Occupations: Writer, literary critic, editor, teacher
- Writing career
- Language: Western Armenian
- Notable works: Ես այդ շունն եմ (I Am That Dog, 1966)
- Notable awards: Movses Khorenatsi Medal (2003)

Boghos Snabian (Western Armenian: Պօղոս Սնապեան; 11 August 1927 – 14 June 2014) was a Lebanese-Armenian writer, literary critic, editor and teacher. One of the founding editors of the Beirut literary periodical Pakin, he ran it from 1966 until 2003, and he published more than thirty books of fiction, criticism and essays in Western Armenian.

== Early life and education ==
Snabian was born on 11 August 1927 in Bitias, one of the Armenian villages of Musa Dagh. He began school in his village and continued at the Harach school in Anjar, where the Armenians of Musa Dagh had been resettled in 1939. In 1944 he entered the Jarankavorats seminary of the Armenian Patriarchate of Jerusalem, from which he graduated in 1949. Hagop Oshagan, who taught at the seminary, became his mentor.

== Career ==
After graduating he returned to Lebanon, where he taught in Armenian schools in Anjar and Beirut. His first published piece, "Dagh Drdmoutyan" ("Song of Grief"), appeared in Sion, the Jerusalem Patriarchate's official journal, and his first novel, Ժամանակ չկայ (There Is No Time), was published in Beirut in 1953. From 1950 he wrote for the literary magazines Nayiri and Agos and contributed short stories, impressionistic prose, criticism and articles to diaspora Armenian newspapers. He also brought out the literary yearbook Mitchnapert in 1957 and 1959.

Pakin first appeared in Beirut in January 1962, launched on the initiative of the Armenian Revolutionary Federation with Garo Sassouni as executive editor and Snabian and Yetvart Boyajian as its editors. The same year Snabian went to Paris, where for two years he attended courses in literature and philosophy as an auditor at the Sorbonne and the Alliance Française. After Boyajian's death in 1966 the editorship passed to Snabian, who kept the magazine appearing without a break, monthly and then, from 1996, quarterly; during his tenure it published some twenty special issues on major Armenian writers. According to Hamazkayin, which publishes the magazine, Pakin under Snabian also printed previously unpublished manuscripts and translations of foreign literature into Armenian, and opposed the censorship of Soviet Armenia. In 2003, as his health declined, Hagop Balian succeeded him as editor.

He worked on the staff of the Beirut daily Aztag from 1966 to 1973, responsible for its community, literary and cultural pages, and from 2007 until his death he edited its literary supplement. He taught Armenian literature at secondary schools in Anjar and Beirut and, from 1983 to 2003, at Hamazkayin's Higher Institute for Armenian Studies in Lebanon. He was a member of the jury of the Kevork Melidinetsi Literary Prize, which the Catholicosate of Cilicia established in 1966, and edited more than fifty volumes of other writers' work, Oshagan's among them.

== Writing ==
Snabian's books comprise novels, literary criticism and essays. Ես այդ շունն եմ (I Am That Dog, 1966) is a prose work whose central character is a dog living near the Alps; it addresses the condition of Armenians scattered after the Armenian genocide and is critical of Soviet rule in Armenia. A Greek translation by Sarkis Agabatian, Εγώ είμαι αυτός ο σκύλος, was published in Athens in June 2019 by the quarterly Armenika.

== Death and recognition ==
Snabian died on 14 June 2014. In 2003 he had received the Movses Khorenatsi Medal of the Republic of Armenia, the Saint Mesrob Mashdots Medal of the Catholicosate of Cilicia and the medal of Hamazkayin's Central Executive Board, and in 2010 he received a letter of blessing from the Catholicosate. In 2015 a house museum named after him was established in Anjar. He was one of six Lebanese-Armenian writers featured in Diaspora Writers, a series of documentary videos by Harout Guluzian produced under the Calouste Gulbenkian Foundation's Creative Culture Program in Lebanon.

== Works ==
Books by Snabian include:

- Ժամանակ չկայ (There Is No Time), novel. Beirut, 1953.
- Յեղափոխութեան համար (For the Revolution), essays. Beirut, 1956; 2nd ed. 2007.
- Վերջին արարը (The Last Act), criticism, published under the pseudonym Դրաստամատ Պիւթացի. Beirut, 1958.
- Անդրշիրիմեան ձայներ (Voices from Beyond the Grave), criticism, a reply to Gurgen Mahari. Beirut, 1960.
- Աւազախրած նաւը (The Stranded Ship), criticism, on Kostan Zarian's novel The Ship on the Mountain. Beirut, 1964.
- Ես այդ շունն եմ (I Am That Dog), prose. Beirut, 1966; Los Angeles, 1992; Yerevan, 2006; Beirut, 2014. Greek translation, Athens, 2019.
- Կորստական թոյներ (Deadly Poisons), short stories. Beirut, 1970; Yerevan, 2007.
- Աղքատներուն աւանդութիւնը (The Tradition of the Poor), short stories, 3 vols. Beirut, 1983, 2002 and 2007.
- Ինչպէս հայհոյեմ... (How Shall I Curse...). Beirut, 1990.
- Միջնարար-5 (Interlude 5), a section of the novel Պղտոր ջուրեր (Murky Waters). Beirut, 1992.
- Յայսմաւուրք (Synaxarion), essays. Antelias, 1997.
- Տարեդարձներ (Anniversaries), literary essays. Beirut, 2001.
- Տպաւորութիւններու հէնքով (On the Groundwork of Impressions), criticism. Antelias, 2003.
- «Ես իմ անոյշ»ի ոդիսականը (The Odyssey of "Yes im anush"), literary study. Beirut, 2003.
- Կրկէսին մէջ (In the Circus), criticism, 3 vols. Beirut and Yerevan, 2005 and 2006.
- Թիւրիմացութեամբ եւ մասամբ նորին (By Misunderstanding, and Partly Thereof), criticism. Beirut, 2007.
- Մեր փարախէն ներս (Inside Our Fold), essays. Beirut, 2007.
- Պատիժներ (Punishments), 2008.
- A Room in Paris, a section of Պղտոր ջուրեր. Beirut, 2008.
- Անընդունելի... (Unacceptable...), criticism. Beirut, 2008.
- Հարցազրոյցներ (Interviews), vol. 1. Beirut, 2008.
- Երկու սպանդ (Two Massacres), historical essays. Beirut, 2008; 2nd ed. 2013.
- Երախտագիտութեան թակարդը (The Trap of Gratitude), a section of Պղտոր ջուրեր. Beirut, 2009.
- Ձգողական (Gravitational), essays. Beirut, 2010.
- Ցերեկային դաւ... (Daylight Plot...), a section of Պղտոր ջուրեր. Beirut, 2010.
- Վերծանումներ (Decipherings), studies of characters in works by Zabel Yesayan, Hagop Oshagan, Kostan Zarian, Yeghishe Charents and Gurgen Mahari. Beirut, 2011.
- Պղտոր ջուրեր... (պրակ 5): Կիսալոյսեր մութ կապերու վրայ (Murky Waters, part 5: Half-Lights on Dark Bonds). Beirut, 2012.
- Շան քարոզներ... (2007–2012) (A Dog's Sermons), criticism. Beirut, 2013.

=== Other publications ===
Snabian also published:

- Mitchnapert, literary yearbook. Beirut, 1957 and 1959.
- Հանդիպումներ Ուիլիըմ Սարոյեանի հետ (Encounters with William Saroyan), 1978.
- Հայաստանի երիտասարդ արձակագիրները (The Young Prose Writers of Armenia), 1980.
- Արագիլ (Stork), 1984.

=== As editor ===
- Մայրիներու շուքին տակ (Under the Shadow of the Cedars), a literary conversation by Hagop Oshagan. Beirut: Altapress, 1983.
- Հարիւր մէկ տարուան (One Hundred and One Years), by Hagop Oshagan. Antelias: Catholicosate of Cilicia, 1997.
