= H-Pem =

- H-Pem logo

- Screenshot Screenshot of website homepage from 27 September 2019
- Website type: Art & Culture
- Available in: en-US
- Owner: Hamapem of Hamazkayin
- Website: h-pem.com
- Registration: Optional

H-Pem (stylized as h-pem) is a collaborative English-language Armenian cultural online platform and publication established by the Hamazkayin Armenian Educational and Cultural Society. Launched and made available to the public on 13 May 2019, h-pem's mission is to reach Armenian communities around the world and help Armenians—particularly Armenian youth—(re)connect with their homeland and culture in new, creative, and cooperative ways.

== History ==
In 2014, Hamazkayin's seventh General Assembly outlined the imperative creation of an innovative online platform to more effectively implement the organization's mission and to reach Armenians in the diaspora—specifically the Diasporan Armenian youth.

Following the General Assembly, a committee was put forth by the Hamazkayin Central Executive and Loucig Guloyan-Srabian was soon appointed as the project manager. Prior to the platform's actual development, Guloyan-Srabian held consultations with English-speaking Armenian youth across North America and elsewhere, to better understand their needs.

The project was named "h-pem" by combining "h" for the Hamazkayin Armenian Educational and Cultural Society, with "pem," the Armenian word for "platform."

Lilly Torosyan joined h-pem in 2017 as the assistant project manager and staff writer, while Rupen Janbazian joined the following year as the platform's editor, content manager, and data protection officer. Shahen Araboghlian, h-pem's social media strategist and management assistant, joined in 2019.

H-Pem was made available to the public on 13 May 2019.

In December 2020, the Hamazkayin Central Executive Board announced a "reduced version" of h-pem's activities and cut the platform's North American staff, citing a reduction in income since the onset of the economic crisis amid the global COVID-19 pandemic.

== Features ==
Though most of the platform is open to the public, h-pem features a free membership option, which allows users to comment on articles, to submit their work and recommendations, and to interact with other users.

H-Pem's content is divided into two main parts: "Featured content," which features pieces written by contributors, and "Your stage," a space in which users' works are highlighted.

The "Featured content" portion of the platform is h-pem's online magazine, which includes stories, interviews, analyses, and profiles of Armenian cultural figures and achievers, as well as stories in pictures.

"Your stage" is an experimental space, which includes a multimedia guide and a submissions area, aspiring and established artists are encouraged to introduce and share their creative output. "Your stage" also features a section for collaborations with artists, writers, cultural executives, students, and graduates from multiple disciplines, as well as organizations, institutions, and community members, on focused projects.

The platform also features a section, which live streams Armenian cultural events around the world.
