= 8th century in Lebanon =

- Key event(s)
- Abbasid Revolution, Mardaite revolts
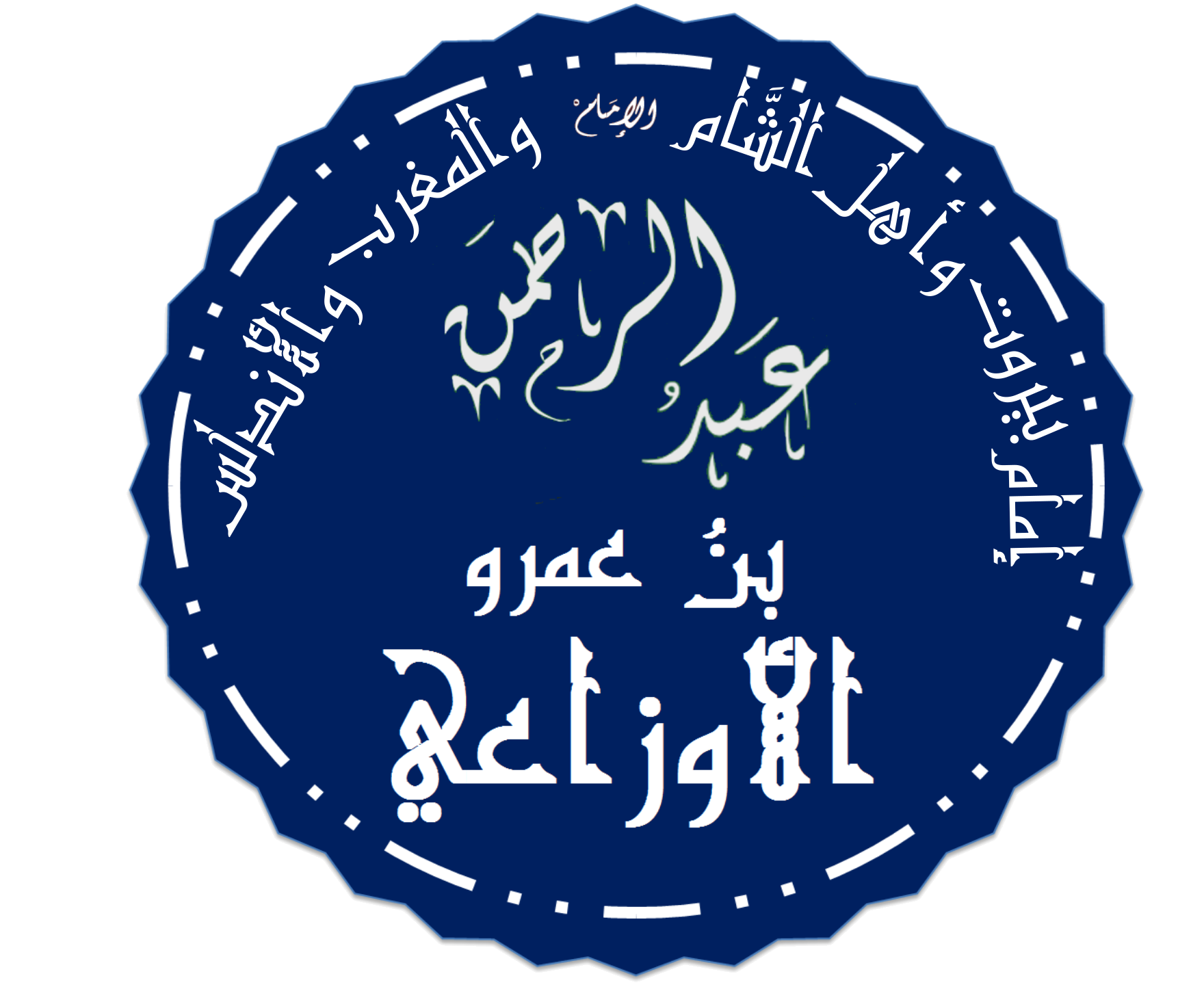
- Calligraphic representation of the name of the 8th century Lebanese Islamic scholar Abd al-Rahman al-Awza'i.
- Chronology
- ← 7th century; 8th century; 9th century →

This article lists historical events that occurred between 701–800 in modern-day Lebanon or regarding its people.

== Administration ==
=== Naval warfare ===
During the days of the Umayyad Caliph Hisham ibn Abd al-Malik, the Byzantines made a sea invasion to Tyre in the year 70 AH / 726 AD. Khalid bin Al-Hasfan Al-Farsi (the Persian) confronted them and forced them to flee after he seized a ship from them that was docked on an island off Tyre and captured those on it. It is likely that Al-Hasfan was the governor of Tyre and one of the invaders of its borders, and the commander of the sea was Yazid bin Abi Maryam whom Hisham dismissed for his negligence in confronting the invaders, and the commander of the sea was appointed in his place, Al-Aswad bin Bilal Al-Muharibi, so he cut off the sea in the year 111 AH / 730 AD in response to that invasion.

The mission of naval defense along the Levantine coast was entrusted to the commander of the sea, which meant Al-Aswad going out to chase the Byzantine invaders during their attack on a merchant ship at the frontier of Beirut. He made an expedition to Cyprus in the year 120 AH / 738 AD and then made an expedition to the island of Crete in the following first or second year.

During the reign of Al-Walid bin Yazid, the power of Al-Aswad increased, and he became the commander of the sea army in the entire coast of the Levant. He led a large expedition to the island of Cyprus, landing there in the year 125 AH / 743 AD, and brought a group of its people and settled them between Sidon and Tyre.

During the reign of Marwan bin Muhammad, the port of Tyre was restored by the master builder "Ziyad bin Abi Al-Ward Al-Ashja’i", who left his name engraved in a phrase that was repeated in the port of Sidon, Acre, Maraash, and even Azerbaijan: "...This is what the Commander of the Faithful Marwan ordered to repair, and it happened on The hand of Ziyad bin Abi Al-Ward."

=== Islamic rule ===
During the reign of Al-Walid, Jarjūmah, the capital of the Mardaites, rebelled against the rule of the Caliph again, as a result, Maslama bin Abd al-Malik went to them at the instigation of his brother and entered their capital Jarjumah and dispersed its people in all the Lebanese cities and stipulated a condition for them, and some of them joined his army and participated in the conquests of Muslims without forcing any of them to leave their Christianity.

=== Abbasid revolution ===
The Abbasids seized power from the Umayyads in 750 AD and annexed Lebanon to their rule. At the beginning of this era, the Arslanites settled in Lebanon in 756 AD. The Abbasids imposed harsh taxes on Lebanon, which prompted the Lebanese to stage several uprisings.

Abdullah bin Ali Al-Hashemi pursued the remnants of Marwan bin Muhammad after the battle of Al-Zab, so he went to the city of Qansreen and then Homs, where he stayed for days taking the pledge of allegiance from its people to Abu Al-Abbas. He continued his journey to Baalbek, and the city received him and pledged allegiance to him without resistance. He stayed there for two nights, then traveled and went down from Ain al-Jisr to Anjar and stayed for two days, then went to the Umayyad capital, and entered it in the year 132 AH / 750 AD. Before leaving Baalbek, he arranged its affairs and kept it to Yazid bin Rouh al-Lakhmi because he declared his allegiance to the Abbasids.

Baalbek became affiliated with the Emirate of Abdullah bin Ali, his emirate included Homs, Qansreen, Baalbek, Ghouta, Houran, Golan, and Jordan from the year 132 AH / 750 AD. To the year 136 AH / 754 AD. Al-Mansūr visited Lebanon in the year 140 AH / 758 AD, and during his visit he settled the Tanukhids in the cities of Lebanon to ward off the Byzantine dangers from its coasts.

=== Mardaite revolts ===
After the fall of the Umayyad state in 132 AH / 750 AD, the Abbasids were unable to win over the people of the Levant to their side, including the inhabitants of Mount Lebanon, because they were deprived of the advantages that they had during the Umayyad era. Moreover, the Abbasids treated the people of the Levant in general as treating the conquered countries during wars, so the Mardaites started a series of revolts, starting in the year 135 AH / 752 AD, and led by one of their leaders "Elias" managed to defeat several armies sent by Caliph al-Mansur to Lebanon, and despite this, Elias was killed in the location known today in the name of "Qob Elias", however, his companions continued their disobedience under the leadership of another leader named "Samaan", who defeated the Abbasid armies and almost took over Homs and Hama through the aid that was coming to him by sea from the Byzantines.

The danger of the Mardaites intensified in the middle of the second century AH when "Bandar" assumed their leadership and declared himself king over them, so Saleh bin Ali, the uncle of the Caliph, mobilized a large army that he led himself and was able to eliminate their revolt and seized and demolished their fortresses, and in order to eliminate any possible rebellion in the future the Caliph Al-Mansur worked to disperse large numbers of them in the Levant, and he brought in several Arab tribes such as the Tanukhids, a Christian Arab tribe; he placed them in Mardaite areas, and this act was the subject of criticism of the Lebanese-born Imam al-Awza'i, who was sent to the Caliph blaming him for such a procedure.

=== Āl Arslān ===
As soon as al-Mansur assumed the caliphate in Baghdad, he went to the coastal frontiers, built their forts and cities, and began filling them with armies from the year 136 AH (753/754 AD) until the year 142 AH (759/760 AD). The Abbasids began approaching and allying themselves with the Arab Tanukhids after a meeting between Prince Mundhir bin Malik, nicknamed Al-Tanukhi, and his brother, Prince Arslan, with Caliph Al-Mansur in Damascus.

The Byzantines took advantage of the political changes resulted by the Abbasid revolution, by attacking the Islamic regions and occupying Tripoli in 141 AH (758/759 AD) from its governor, Rabāh bin al-Nu’mān, with Bekaa getting attacked by the rebel Elias in the year 137 AH (754/755 AD) and the Munaytirah revolt took place in 141 AH. And when events escalated, it became imperative for the Abbasid Caliph al-Manṣūr to fight back with combat to defend the Caliphate. He mobilized the frontiers with fighters to protect them. He assigned the Tanukhid tribes to head to the mountains of Beirut to protect the coasts of the Levant and Islamic possessions from the Byzantine danger and local hostile movements.

When Abu Jaafar Mansur al-Abbasi came to Syria in the year 142 AH / 758 AD, Prince Mundhir and Prince Arslan came from their homeland in Maarrat al-Nu`man with a group of their clan and they met him in As-Sham, and he had heard about their courage in fighting the Byzantines in Antioch and its suburbs, so he welcomed them and assigned them to go with their people to the mountains of Beirut to protect the coasts and frontiers in which he made them leaders of several fiefs. The two princes walked with their clans to Wadi al-Taym, and lodged in the fortress known as the fortress of Abi al-Jaish.

In the second year [143 AH / 759 AD] they proceeded to the south of Jabal Mughithah, then the clans dispersed in the coastal areas, so Prince Mundhir settled in the fortress of Sarhmoul, Prince Arslan in Sin El Fil, Prince Hassan bin Malik in Tardala, Prince Abdullah bin Al-Numan bin Malik in Kafra, and Prince Fawaris bin Abd al-Malik ibn Malik in Aabey, and the Muqaddamun and their clans were dispersed in the country in which there was twelve of them.

=== Administrative rulers ===
The 10th-century geographers Ibn al-Faqih and Al Muqadassi and the 13th-century geographer Yaqut al-Hamawi held that besides its capital at Tiberias, Tyre was one of Urdunn's chief districts (qurā).

== Events ==
=== 720s ===
- The Byzantines makes a sea invasion to Tyre in the year 70 AH / 726 AD.
- Dythelitism's introduction into Syria via Byzantine prisoners of the Arabs in 727 leads to heated discussions that includes the monks of Beth-Maroun.
- Yaḥya bin Abu-Kathir, a faqīh and tābi', advises Al-Awzā'i to leave Al-Yamamah for Basra, so he went there in the year 110 AH (728-729 AD).

=== 730s ===
- Al-Aswad bin Bilal Al-Muharibi, the governor of Tyre, cuts off the sea from the Byzantines in the year 111 AH / 730 AD.
- Al-Awza'i begins issuing fatwas in the year 113 AH (731/732 AD) at the age of twenty-five years.

=== 740s ===
- Because of a ban of travel imposed by the Arabs, the patriarch of Antioch, George II (who was a residing in Constantinople) could not be replaced after his death in 702 AD, this made the Maronite patriarch the sole patriarch to the see of Antioch until 742 or 745/748 when the Caliph Hisham or Marwan respectively gave the Melkites the right to elect their own Patriarch.
- In 747/748 AD (130 AH) Ash-sham suffers from Ar-rajafah (Arabic: ٱلرَّجَفَةُ; lit. 'The shivering'), an earthquake that caused the destruction of numerous libraries that subsequently got caught on fire and annihilated much of Al-Awza'i works and writings.
- Baalbek is sacked with great violence by the Damascene caliph Marwan II in 748, at which time it was dismantled and largely depopulated.
- Around 749 the Maronite community, in the Lebanon mountains, builds the Mar-Mama church at Ehden. Meanwhile, caught between the Byzantines and the Arabs, the monastery at Beth-Maron struggles to survive.

=== 750s ===
- The Abbasid rebels overthrow and massacre the Umayyads in the Abbasid revolution, 750 AD.
- At the time of the fifth Maronite patriarch, John Maron II, the Roman temple at Yanouh is converted into a church consecrated to Saint George, 750 AD.
- The Mardaites start their first revolt, which is led by their leader "Elias", starting in the year 135 AH (752/753 AD).
- Bekaa gets attacked by the rebel Elias in the year 137 AH (754/755 AD).
- The Arslanites settle in Lebanon in 756 AD.

The start of Elias' biography in the sole manuscript copy. His name in Greek, Ήλία, can be read in the middle of the second line.

- Abbasid Caliph Al-Mansūr visits Lebanon in the year 140 AH / 758 AD.
- In 759, the Abbasids' harsh treatment to conquered lands leads to a failed revolt by Lebanese mountaineers. According to Theophanes the Confessor: "[In 759 CE] a certain Theodore, a Lebanese Syrian (Syros Libanites) rose up against the Arabs in the territory of Heliopolis, near Lebanon, and fought them: many were slain from both sides..."
- Tripoli is occupied by the Byzantines, 141 AH (758/759 AD).
- Prince Arslan bin al-Mundhir founds the Principality of Sin-el-Fil in Beirut, 759.

=== 770s ===
- Elias of Heliopolis gets executed on 1 February 779.

=== 790s ===
- Mas'ūd ibn Arslān moves from Sinn al-fīl to the Shewayfāt, 183 AH (799/800 AD).

== Architecture ==
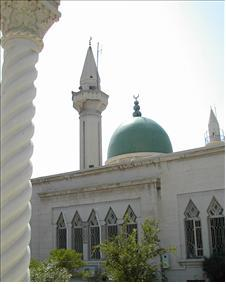
Imam Al Awza'i Mosque

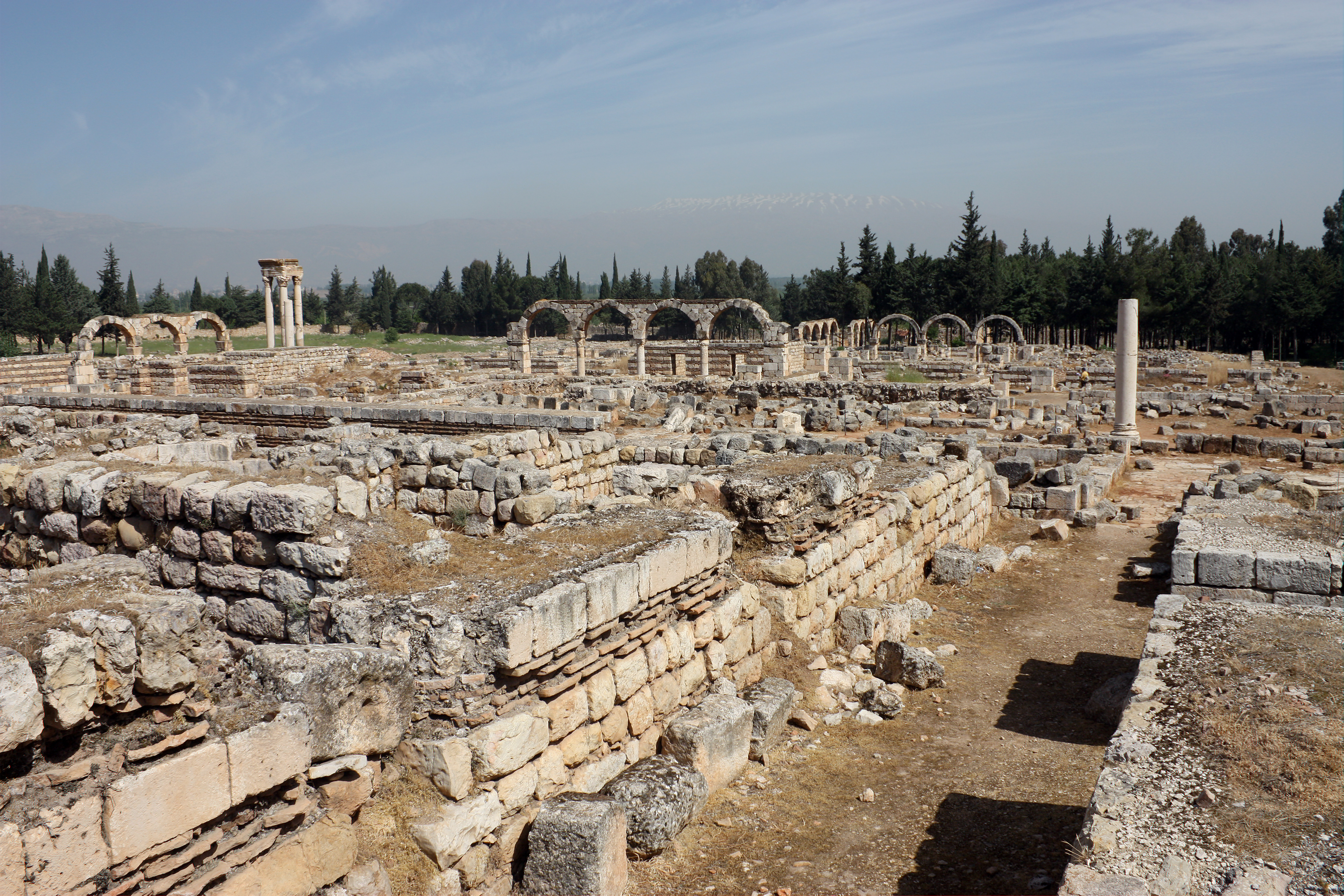
Ruins of Umayyad palace, Anjar, Lebanon.

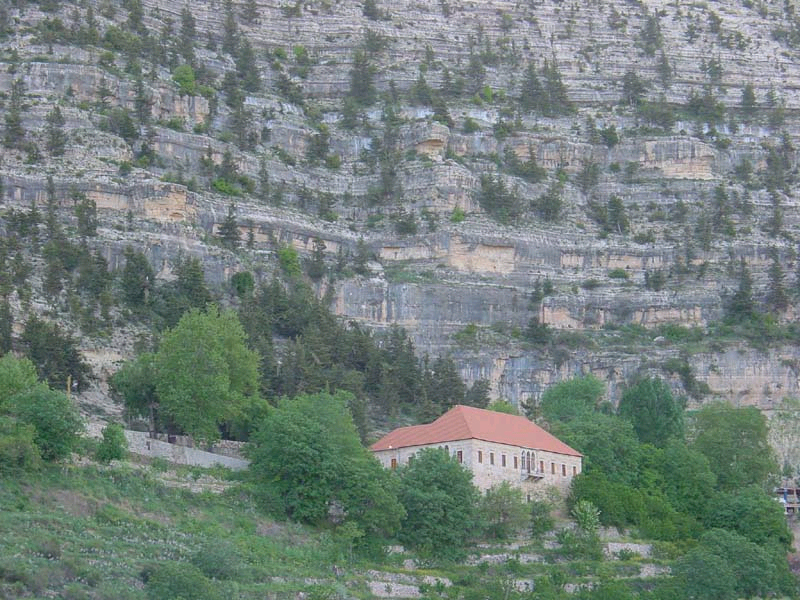
Monastery of Saints Sarkis & Bakhos

- Imam al-Awzai Mosque, south of Beirut, where the tomb of Imam Abd al-Rahman al-Awzai is located.
- Anjar (Gerrha), founded during the Umayyad period under Caliph Walid Ibn Abd Al-Malak (705-715).
- Mar Sarkis, Ehden
- Saint Nicholas Cathedral, Sidon.
- Mar-Mama church, Ehden, built in 749 AD.
- Great Umayyad mosque of Baalbek, built in 96 AH (714/715 AD).

== People ==
=== 700s ===
- John Maroun dies in 707 AD in Kfarhay, near Batroun.
- Abd al-Rahman al-Awza'i, (also known as "Imam al-Hafiz, imam of Beirut and the rest of the ash-Sham, al-Maghrib and al-Andalus", or Abu Amr Abd al-Rahman ibn Amr ibn Yahmad al-Awza’i) an Islamic scholar, traditionalist and the chief representative and eponym of the ʼAwzāʿī school of Islamic jurisprudence; is born in 707 CE, Baalbek, Lebanon.
- The Tyrian-born Pope Sisinnius dies on 4 February 708 after just twenty-one calendar days of papacy, making him one of the shortest-reigning popes.

=== 710s ===
- The Tyrian-born Pope Constantine dies in Rome on 9 April 715.

=== 750s ===
- Elias of Heliopolis is born in 758 /759 AD, Baalbek.

=== 760s ===
- Mas'ūd ibn Arslān, member of the Lebanese Arsalanite family, is born in 762 AD.

=== 770s ===
- Hisham al-Jrashi al-Sidawi (The Sidonian), an Imam of the Hadith dies in 156 AH (772/773 AD).
- Al-Awza'i dies in January, 20 in 774 AD and is buried near Beirut.

=== 780s ===
- Abu Muti’ Mu’awiyah bin Yahya al-Tarabulsi (The Tripolitan), history transmitter, dies in 170 AH (786/787 AD).
- Prince Arslan bin al-Mundhir dies and is buried in Beirut, 787 AD.

== See also ==
- Al-Awza'i maddhab

== Bibliography ==
- Treadgold, Warren (1997). A History of the Byzantine State and Society. Stanford, California: Stanford University Press. ISBN 0-8047-2630-2.
- Crone, Patricia (1980). Slaves on Horses: The Evolution of the Islamic Polity (1980 ed.). Cambridge: Cambridge University Press. ISBN 978-0521229616.
- Lammens, H. (1987). "MASLAMA". In Houtsma, Martijn Theodoor (ed.). E.J. Brill's First Encyclopaedia of Islam, 1913–1936, Volume V. Leiden: Brill. p. 394. ISBN 90-04-08265-4.
- Gil, Moshe (1997) [1983]. A History of Palestine, 634–1099. Translated by Ethel Broido. Cambridge: Cambridge University Press. ISBN 0-521-59984-9.
- Ahmed, Asad Q. (2010). The Religious Elite of the Early Islamic Ḥijāz: Five Prosopographical Case Studies. Oxford: University of Oxford Linacre College Unit for Prosopographical Research. ISBN 978-1-900934-13-8.
- Sharon, Moshe (1999). Corpus Inscriptionum Arabicarum Palaestinae (CIAP) Volume Two: B-C. Leiden, Boston and Koln: Brill. ISBN 90-04-11083-6.
- Amitai-Preiss, Nitzan (2015). "What Happened in 155/771-72? The Testimony of Lead Seals". In Talmon-Heller, Daniella; Cytryn-Silverman, Katia (eds.). Material Evidence and Narrative Sources: Interdisciplinary Studies of the History of the Muslim Middle East. Leiden and Boston: Brill. ISBN 978-90-04-27159-3.
- Lilie, Ralph-Johannes; Ludwig, Claudia; Pratsch, Thomas; Zielke, Beate (2000). "Maslama ibn 'Abd al-Malik (# 4868)". Prosopographie der mittelbyzantinischen Zeit: 1. Abteilung (641–867), Band 3: Leon (# 4271) – Placentius (# 6265) (in German). Berlin and Boston: De Gruyter. pp. 190–191. ISBN 978-3-11-016673-6.
- le Strange, Guy (1890). Palestine Under the Moslems: A Description of Syria and the Holy Land from A.D. 650 to 1500. London: Committee of the Palestine Exploration Fund. OCLC 1004386.
