= 9th century in Lebanon =

- Key event(s)
- Beginning of the rise of Shia Islam
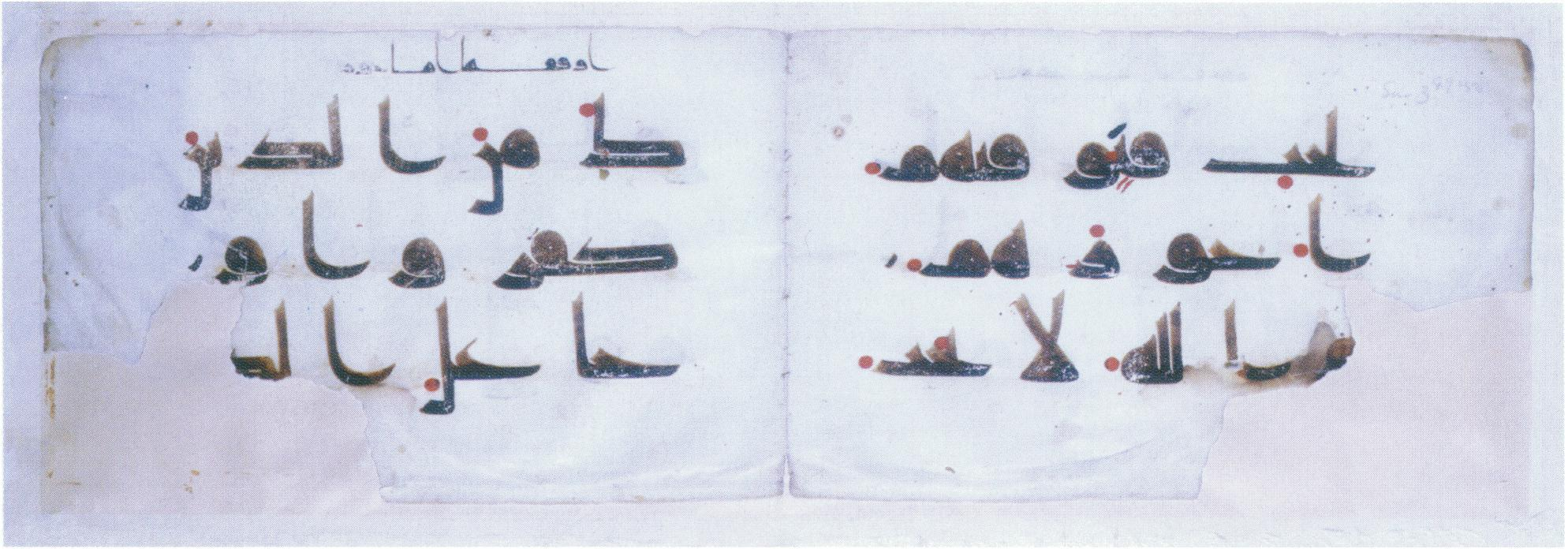
- Double page from the Amajur Qur'an, a Mus'haf donated to a mosque in Tyre by an Abbasid governor in 876 AD
- Chronology
- ← 8th century; 9th century; 10th century →

This article lists historical events that occurred between 801–900 in modern-day Lebanon or regarding its people.

== Administration ==
=== Abbasid Era ===
In the Abbasid era, the writings of travelers and geographers began to describe the city of Tyre, and one of the first one to do so was Ibn al-Faqih al-Hamdani, who only said: “Tyre: its input is to Damascus, and its output is to Jordan.” Ka’b al-Ahbar said: “Whoever among you wants to collect his religion and his worldly affairs for him, then he should go to Tyre.” And after Isa bin al-Sheikh - the Wali of Palestine - was able to defeat al-Muwafaq al-Khairi in the year 251 AH/865 AD, he asked the Abbasid Caliph, Al-Musta'īnubillāh, to write to the ruler of Tyre, ordering four boats with all their vessels to be at his disposal.

And when Ibn al-Sheikh refused to pledge allegiance to Al-Mu'tamid as caliph, and the Abbasids overpowered him, he resorted with his family to Tyre and fortified the city to prevent its port's destruction by the Caliph’s influence to expel him from it by negotiation. So he sent the two faqihs: “Ismail bin Abdullah Al-Marwazi” and “Muhammad bin Obaidullah Al-Karizi Al-Qadi”, and he sent with them his messenger “Al-Hussain Al-Khadim” known as “The Sweat of Death”, they offered Ghaban al-Sheikh to leave the Levant in safety and take over an Armenian country, so he agreed, and he left Tyre by the coastal road to his state between 256 - 257 AH / 870 AD.

=== Tulunid Era ===
After Ahmad ibn Tulun became independent in Egypt in the year 258 AH / 872 AD, he went to Damascus, and conquered it after the death of its guardian Ibn Majour in the year 264 AH / 878 AD. After Damascus, he completed the subjugation of the cities of the Levant: Homs and Hama, and his sons and commanders took over. Thus, he was the first Muslim ruler in Egypt to include the Levant. Baalbek was stuck between the Tulunids and their enemies aspiring to rule. Baalbek sided with Lu'lu', the Emir of Homs, who disobeyed his master by supporting the Caliph (Al-Mu'tamid) and his brother (Al-Muwaffaq).

Tyre was in good conditions, Ahmad ibn Tulun was amazed by its construction, and when he arrived in Acre, he found that it didn't have the same good conditions of Tyre, so he gathered the workers of the city and ordered them to make Acre have conditions similar to those of Tyre.

=== Local Administration ===
Tannus al-Shidyaq's chronicles mention that in the 9th century there was an organized Christian, likely Maronite, community in Kisrawan governed by a village headmen.

== Events ==
=== 800s ===
- Faraj, the master of the Sufi ascetic Ibrahim ibn Adham, narrates in Tyre in the year 186 AH / 803 AD about a dream Ibrahim had about the same city.

=== 810s ===
- The first struggle on Lebanese territories takes place in Chebaa between the Qaysites and the Yamanites, 811 AD.

=== 860s ===
- Isa bin al-Sheikh, the Wali of Palestine, asks the Abbasid Caliph, Al-Musta'īnubillāh, to write to the ruler of Tyre, ordering four boats with all their vessels to be at his disposal, 251 AH/865 AD.
- Thomas is bishop of Tyre (before 869 – after 879).

=== 870s ===
- Isa bin al-Sheikh – then in Tyre with his family – leaves the city for Armenia as part of an agreement with the caliph, 870 AD.
- According to Jaafar al-Muhajir, Yaman-affiliated tribes which lived in the surroundings of Baalbek before 872, such as Banu Kalb and Banu Hamdan that were aligned with Alid and Shiite sentiments at the time, likely played a role in spreading Shia Islam in the Bekaa valley.
- Theophilact ibn Qanbara of Harran, goldsmith of the last Umayyad Caliph Marwan II, and who, by order of the caliph, became patriarch of the Malkite Rum, persecutes the Maronites in 874.
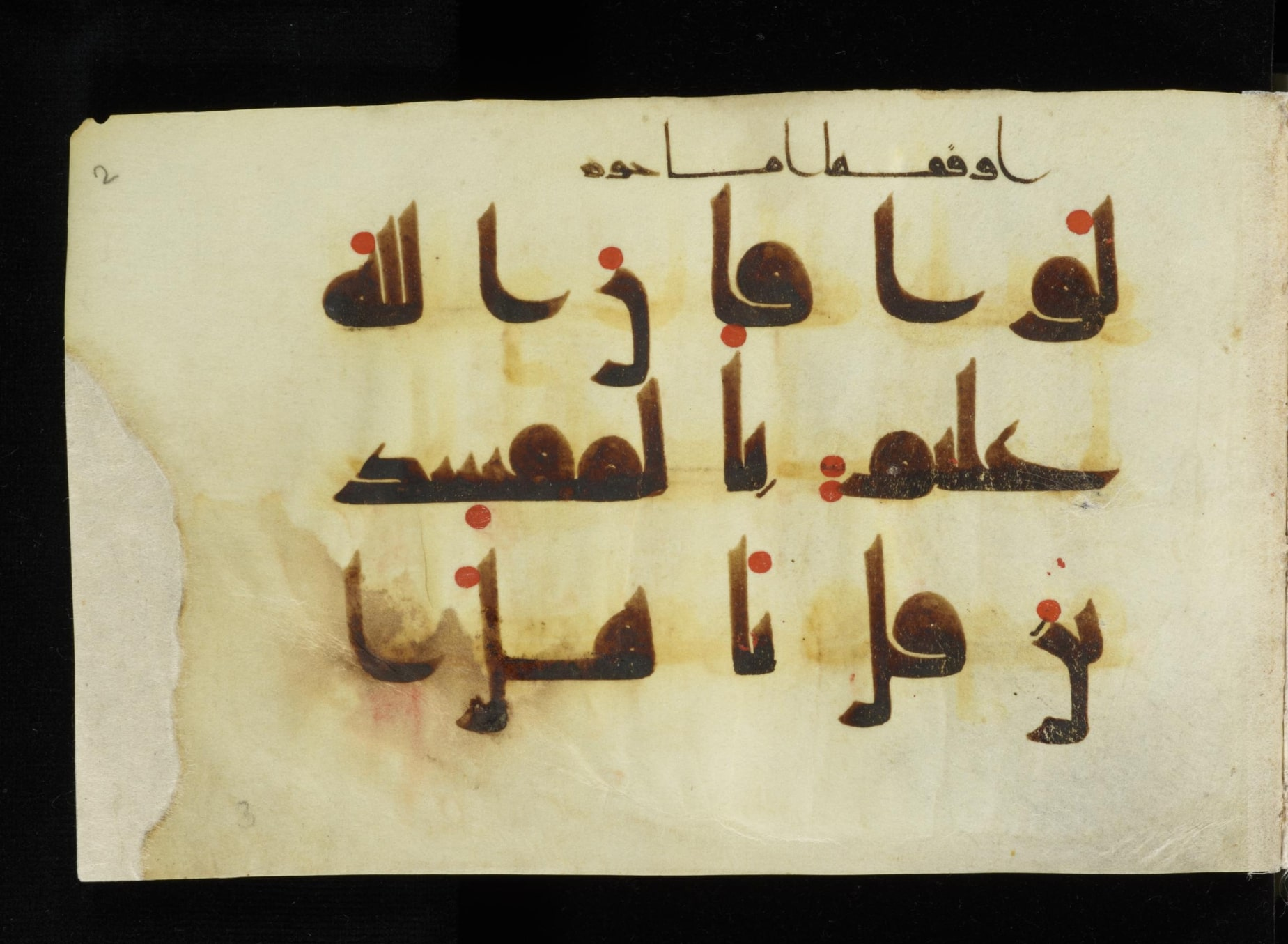
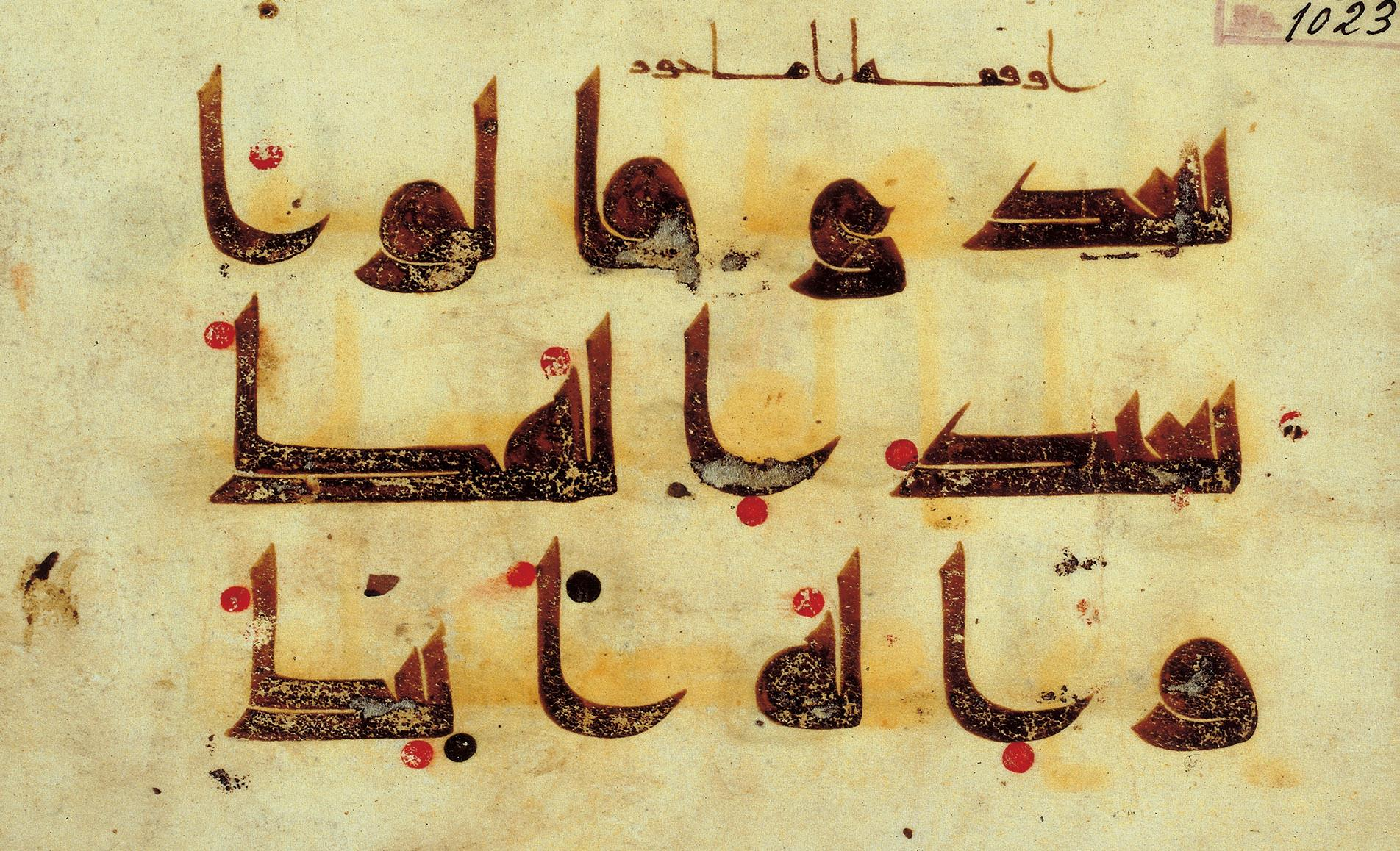
Pages from the Amajur Mus'haf
- The Amajur Qur'an, a Mus'haf made for Amajur, Abbasid governor of Damascus in the 870s, is donated in 876 AD (by Amajur himself) to a mosque in the city of Tyre in Lebanon.
- In 878, the Jordan valley is occupied by the Tulunids, extending in the north to the outposts in the Anti-Lebanon mountains on the Byzantine border, enabling them to defend Egypt against Abbasid attack.

Tulunid Emirate in 893

=== 880s ===
- Muhammad bin Ibrāhīm as-Ṣūri, (Note: "As-Ṣūrī" (ٱلصُّورِيُّ) lit. meaning "The Tyrian" (from Ṣūr, Arabic for Tyre)) a Tyrian Shi'ite figure is at his height in 883 CE.

== Architecture ==
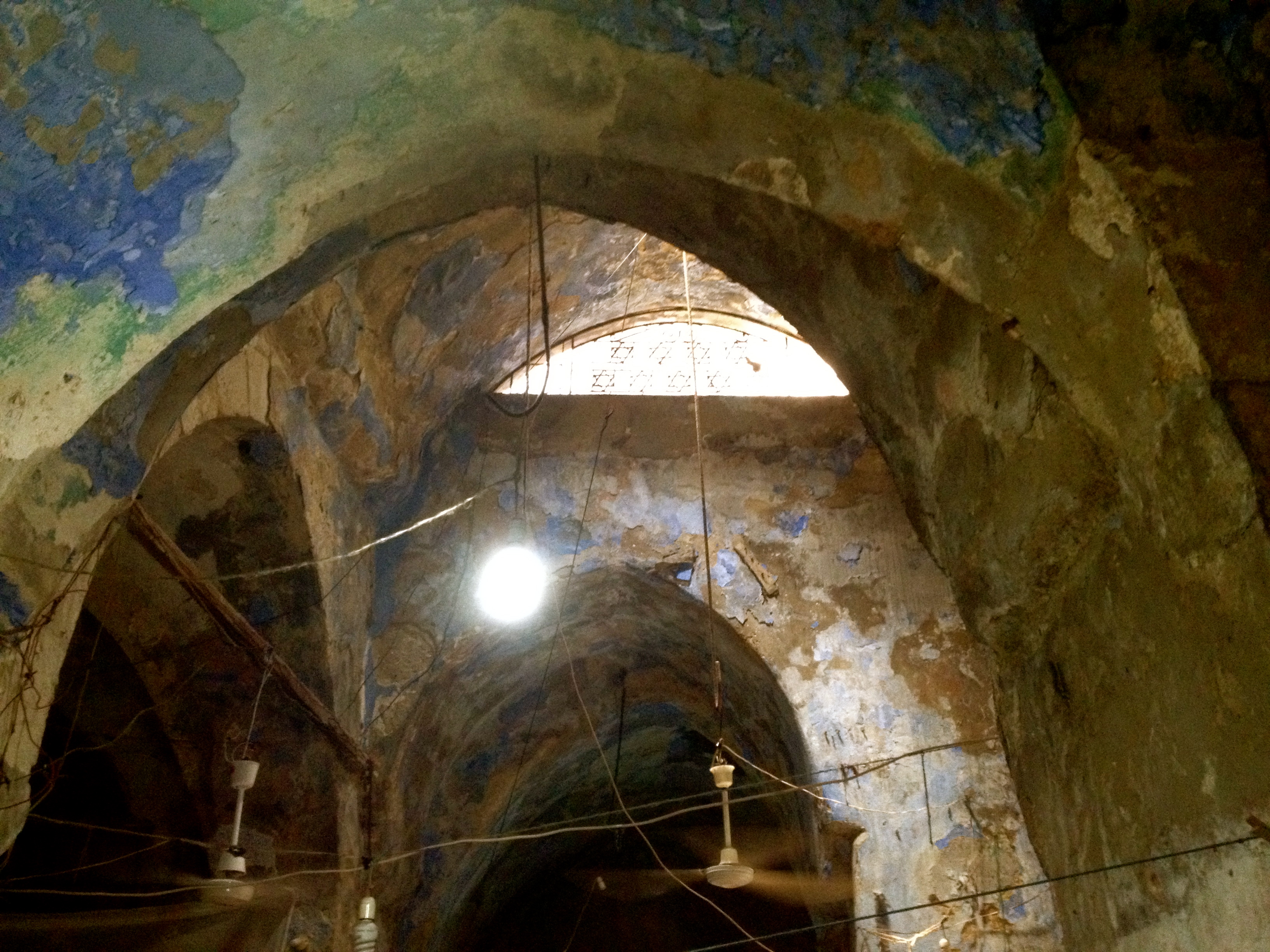
Sidon Synagogue in Sidon, Lebanon, July 2012

- Sidon Synagogue, completed in 833 AD.

== People ==
=== 820s ===
- Qusta ibn Luqa, a Melkite Christian physician, philosopher, astronomer, mathematician and translator, is born in Baalbek, 820 AD.

== Sources ==
- CARTER, Terry & DUNSTON, Lara. Libano, Torino, EDT, 2004. ISBN 88-7063-748-4
- SALIBI, Kamal. A House of Many Mansions: The History of Lebanon Reconsidered, London, I.B. Tauris, 1988. ISBN 0-520-06517-4
- MOURAD, Bariaa. Du Patrimoine à la Muséologie : Conception d'un musée sur le site archéologique de Tyr, Thèse de DEA (études doctorales); Museum National d'Histoire Naturelle (MNHN), Étude réalisée en coopération avec l'Unesco, Secteur de la Culture, Division du Patrimoine Culturel, 1998.
- KHURI, Elias & BEYDOUN, Ahmad. Rappresentare il Mediterraneo. Lo sguardo libanese, Messina, Mesogea, 2006. ISBN 88-469-2021-X
