= Pakin =

Pakin (or gallicised Pakine, Armenian: Բագին, lit. 'pagan altar') is an Armenian-language literary and cultural periodical published in Beirut, Lebanon since 1962. The magazine was founded by Garo Sassouni as executive editor and Yetvart Boyajian and Boghos Snabian as editors. Pakin publishes works mainly of Armenian diaspora writers in addition to some writings from Armenia, as well as reports on culture, art, interviews and literary criticism.

Pakin is published with various frequencies, as monthly, bi-monthly and presently quarterly. It is considered one of the main literary publications in Western Armenian. Its longest-running editor-in-chief was writer Boghos Snabian from 1964 to 2003, when writer Hagop Balian took over the responsibility. A number of writers have contributed including Haroutioun Keghart, Dikran Vosgouni, Papken Papazian, and Vahé Oshagan. The magazine is also renowned for its series of special issues dedicated to certain writers or events.

Since 2016, Sonia Kiledjian-Ajemian is the editor of Pakin.
