= Zakar Keshishian =

Armenian musician (born 1968)

- Born: February 15, 1968 (age 58); Anjar, Lebanon
- Genres: sacred, classical, folk, contemporary
- Occupation: conductor
- Instruments: shvi duduk
- Website: zakarkeshishian.org//

Zakar Keshishian (Armenian: Զաքար Քեշիշյան, born February 15, 1968) is an Armenian musician.

== Biography ==
Zakar Keshishian was born in Anjar, Lebanon. In 1993 he graduated from the Komitas State Conservatory of Yerevan, the Faculty of Folk Instruments. In 1996 he hold a diploma as Choirmaster and also completed the post-graduate program in Conducting from the same conservatory.

He founded the following choirs:

- the Gakavig choir of the Hamazkayin Educational and Cultural Society (1988)
- Dziadzan (1992)
- Varanda (1992, in Shushi)
- Mountainous Karabakh (Artsakh)
- the Gargatch choir (1997)
- the Ayc Armenian Youth Choir (2008, under the auspices of the Hamazkayin Educational and Cultural Society)

From 1998–2000 Keshishian co-directed Parsegh Ganatchian Musical College. 2006 – 2009 he was the leader of Shnorhali choir of the Catholicosate of Cilicia (Antelias, Lebanon). In 2012 he participated in Esterazy international festival performing George Pelecis's "Ahoush's story" with the renowned "Cremereata Baltica" orchestra.

Keshishian teaches at the Lebanese National Higher Conservatory of Music, he is a professor at the Parsegh Ganatchian Musical College and lecturer at Haigazian University. He is also the Artistic Director and Conductor of the Varanda Children's and Junior Youth Choir in Shushi, as well as the Gargatch Children's Juvenile Choir and the Ayc Youth Choir and folk orchestra in Beirut.

== Awards ==
- "Vatchakan Parebashd" presidential medal (2002)
- "Honorable Citizenship" medal (2004)
- "Yeghishe" All Armenian Cultural Award (2005)
- "I. H. Ataian" Cultural Award (2007)
- "Appreciation" presidential medal (2011)
- Medal of National organization for the Lebanese Child" (2011)

=== CDs ===
- "Fortress" City CD (2005)
- "Nrneni" CD (2007)

== Family ==
Zakar Keshishian is married to pianist and poet, Kamila Yerkanyan Keshishian and has one son, Vahagn Keshishian.
