= Mount Lebanon revolts of 752 and 759 =

Anti-Abbasid Christian revolts in Lebanon, 752–760

- Part of the Arab–Byzantine wars
Date	752–754/759–760
Location	Mount Lebanon, Beqaa Valley, Homs, and Hama (present day Lebanon and Syria
Result	Abbasid victory: Maronites become centralized around Northern Mount Lebanon
Territorial changes	Christian inhabitants of parts of interior and coastal Lebanon expelled and replaced with Arab tribes

Belligerents
Mardaites; Maronites; Melkites; Byzantine Empire	Abbasid Caliphate; Tanukhids; Lakhmids

Commanders and leaders
Elias †; Simon; Bandar (Theodore); Constantine V	As-Saffah; Al-Mansur; Salih ibn Ali; Abu Muslim

The Mount Lebanon revolts of 752 and 759 were a series of anti-Abbasid revolts by the Christian inhabitants of Lebanon as a response to the Abbasid oppression of the region. The first of these revolts began in the year 752 under the Mardaite prince Elias of Baskinta. Elias battled the Arabs in many parts of the Beqaa Valley but ultimately met his fate in a town now named after him known as Qabb Ilyas. However the Christians were not discouraged and a new leader known as Simon continued the rebellion, almost taking Homs and Hama of Syria with the support of the Byzantine navy. A second rebellion, commonly known as the Munayṭirah Revolt (Arabic: ثورة المنيطرة), occurred in 759 when a man known as Bandar (or Theodore in some sources) declared himself king over all of the Mardaites. Salih ibn Ali, the uncle of the Abbasid caliph, ambushed Bandar near Baalbek and defeated him. After this the Caliph migrated several Arab tribes to the Christian regions forcing the expulsion of many from their native villages.

== Background ==
In the year 750 the Abbasids overthrew the Umayyad Caliphate and took most of its former territories. This included parts of modern-day Lebanon such as the Beqaa Valley. Unlike their predecessors who were more tolerant towards the Christians of Lebanon, at least since Maronite-Byzantine relations deteriorated, the Abbasids were harsh towards the Lebanese Christians harassing and heavily taxing them.

== Mardaite raid on the Beqaa ==
In the year 752 a Mardaite prince known as Elias of Baskinta began to raid the Beqaa region as a response to the oppression of the Abbasids. Elias set up base in a town known as al-Muruj and turned it into his headquarters assuming control of the Beqaa. When the Abbsaid caliph As-Saffah heard about this he sent an envoy bringing a robe of honor and the two sides sat to eat together. However, Elias became drunk and infatuated with a dancing maiden which caused his captains to lose their confidence in him and abandon him. Unbeknownst to Elias or his men, a group of soldiers were following the envoys and attacked Elias while he was drunk, killing him and many of his men. The soldiers then set al-Muruj on fire and retook control of the Beqaa. Elias was buried in this town and it came to be known as Qabb Ilyas which is derived from Qabr Elias meaning "grave of Elias". A Roman wayside shrine carved into a rock above the town is popularly considered to be the grave of the prince.

However, not all of the Mardaites were discouraged as a new leader called Simon took control and pushed the Abbasid armies back, going as far as almost taking Homs and Hama through aid from the Byzantine navy. The Abbasids then attempted to invade the town of Shweir but were repelled and retreated.

== Munayṭirah revolt ==
In the year 759 people in Lebanon began to rebel against the kharaj tax collector of Baalbek. A youthful mountaineer of huge physique named Bandar, or Theodore in some sources, led the uprising from the Munayṭirah mountain region and declared himself king over all of the Mardaites. The uncle of the caliph Salih ibn Ali, who was also a general of the Abbasid army, raised many men to confront Bandar. The two sides met and casualties were high on both sides but the Abbasids eventually ambushed and routed the Christians on their way to Baalbek, with Bandar fleeing to Tripoli (which was under Byzantine control) leaving his companions to be massacred.

== Aftermath ==
Salih then began a reign of terror against the Christians in the region, targeting rebels and dhimmis alike. Many Christians were slaughtered or forced to flee their homes in exile. However, not all Muslims supported this persecution of the Christians including the imam al-Awza'i who criticized Salih for his commands stating:

Thou hast heard of the expulsion of the dhimmis from Mt. Lebanon, although they did not side with those who rebelled, and of whom many were killed by thee and the rest returned to their villages. How didst thou then punish the many for the fault of the few and make them leave their homes and possessions in spite of Allah's decree: 'Nor shall any sinning one bear the burden of another,' which is the most rightful thing to abide by and follow! The command worthy of the strictest observance and obedience is that of the Prophet who says, 'If one oppresses a man bound to us by covenant and charges him with more than he can do, I am the one to overcome him by arguments.

To ensure that similar revolts would not take place Al-Mansur sent Arab tribes such as the Tanukhids and Lakhmids to emigrate and settle in Lebanon. The Arab tribes mostly settled south of Beirut in the mountainous and coastal areas notably blocking off the Afqa corridor from Maronites which was their access to the coastline. This also prevented the Byzantines from sending their ships to the region. This tactic proved effective as the Arabs successfully fended off two Mardaite raids in 791 and 875.

Some of the Arab families that migrated to Lebanon during this period would become prominent dynasties such as the Arslans, Buhturids, and Abi'l-Lama's.

== See also ==
- 8th century in Lebanon
- Revolt of Tyre (996–998)
- Byzantine–Arab wars (780–1180)
