= Anjar, Lebanon =

Anjar عنجر Անճար
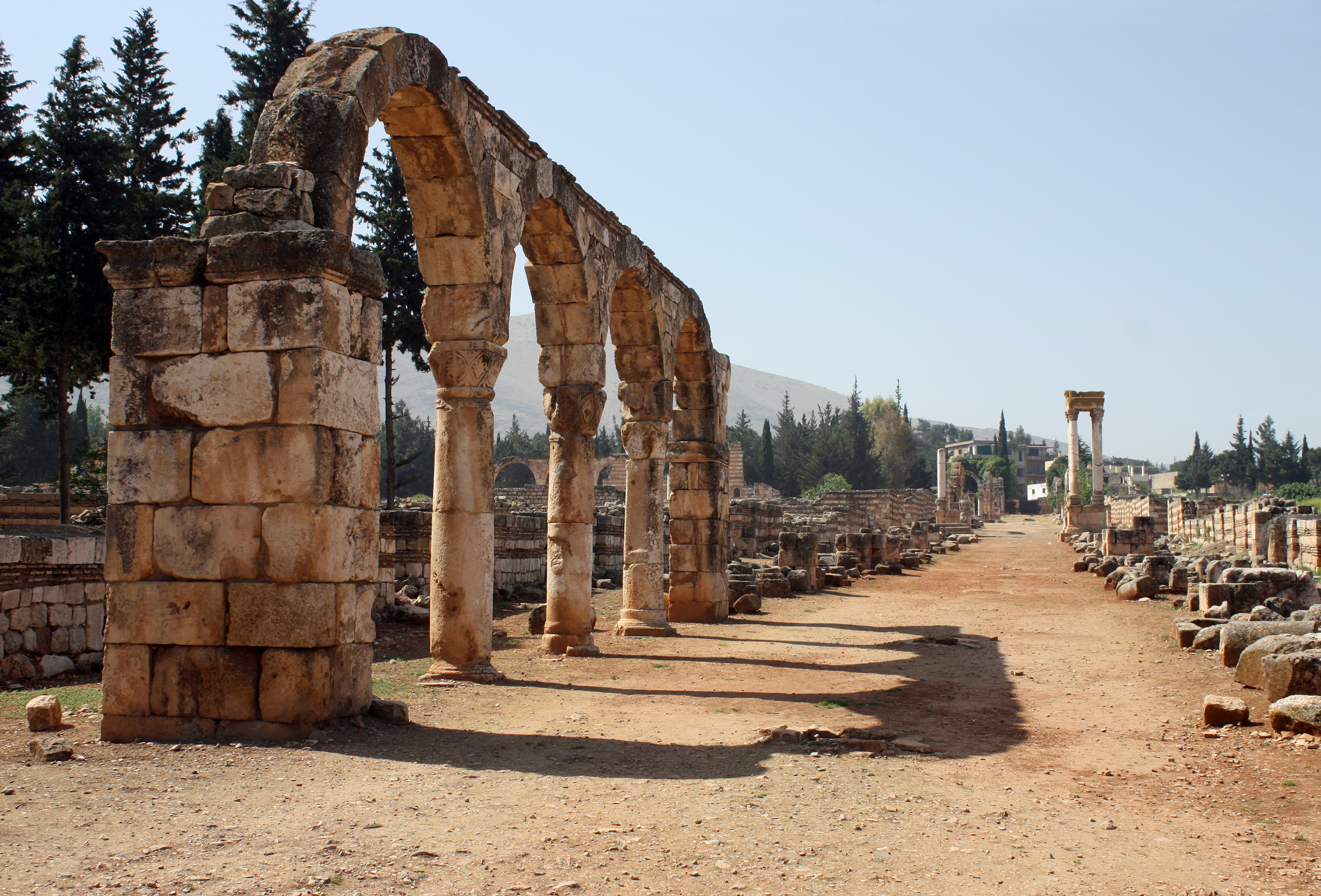
- The cardo of the Umayyad city of Anjar

- Location in Lebanon
- Coordinates: 33°43′33″N 35°55′47″E
- Country: Lebanon
- Governorate: Beqaa Governorate
- District: Zahle District
- Time zone: UTC+2 (EET)
  - Summer (DST): +3

UNESCO World Heritage Site
- Official name: Anjar
- Type: Cultural
- Criteria: iii, iv
- Designated: 1984 (8th session)
- Reference no.: 293
- Region: Arab States

Anjar (meaning "unresolved or running river"; Arabic: عنجر / ALA-LC: ‘Anjar), also known as Hawsh Mousa (Arabic: حوش موسى / Ḥawsh Mūsá), is a town of Lebanon, near the Syrian border, located in the Bekaa Valley. The population is 2,400, consisting almost entirely of Armenians. The total area is about twenty square kilometers (7.7 square miles). Since 1984, the ruins of the Umayyad settlement of Anjar have been recognized by UNESCO as a World Heritage Site.

== History ==
The town's foundation is generally attributed to the Umayyad caliph al-Walid I, at the beginning of the 8th century, as a palace-city. Syriac graffiti found in the quarry from which the best stone was extracted offer the year 714, and Byzantine and Syriac sources attribute the establishment of the town to Umayyad princes, with one Syriac chronicle mentioning Walid I by name, while the Byzantine chronicler Theophanes the Confessor recorded that it was Walid's son, al-Abbas, who started building the town in 709–10. Historian Jere L. Bacharach accepts Theophanes' date. Although earlier materials were re-used, much of the city is built on virgin soil.

After being abandoned in later years, Anjar was resettled in 1939 with several thousand Armenian refugees from the Musa Dagh area. Its neighborhoods are named after the six villages of Musa Dagh: Haji Habibli, Kebusiyeh, Vakif, Kheder Bek, Yoghunoluk and Bitias.

During the civil war, the Syrian Army chose Anjar as one of its main military bases in the Beqaa Valley and the headquarters of its intelligence services.

Following the civil war, Anjar started to rebuild economically. Many of its inhabitants emigrated to other countries, mainly to Europe, Canada, and the United States. Nevertheless, today Anjar is an example to many other entities in the region because of its low crime rate, reduced air pollution, and living standards. During the 2020 COVID-19 pandemic, the village rapidly imposed strict measures and set an example for the rest of the country.

In November 2024, UNESCO gave Anjar enhanced protection to safeguard against damage to the archaeological site during the Israeli invasion of Lebanon.

== Umayyad ruins ==
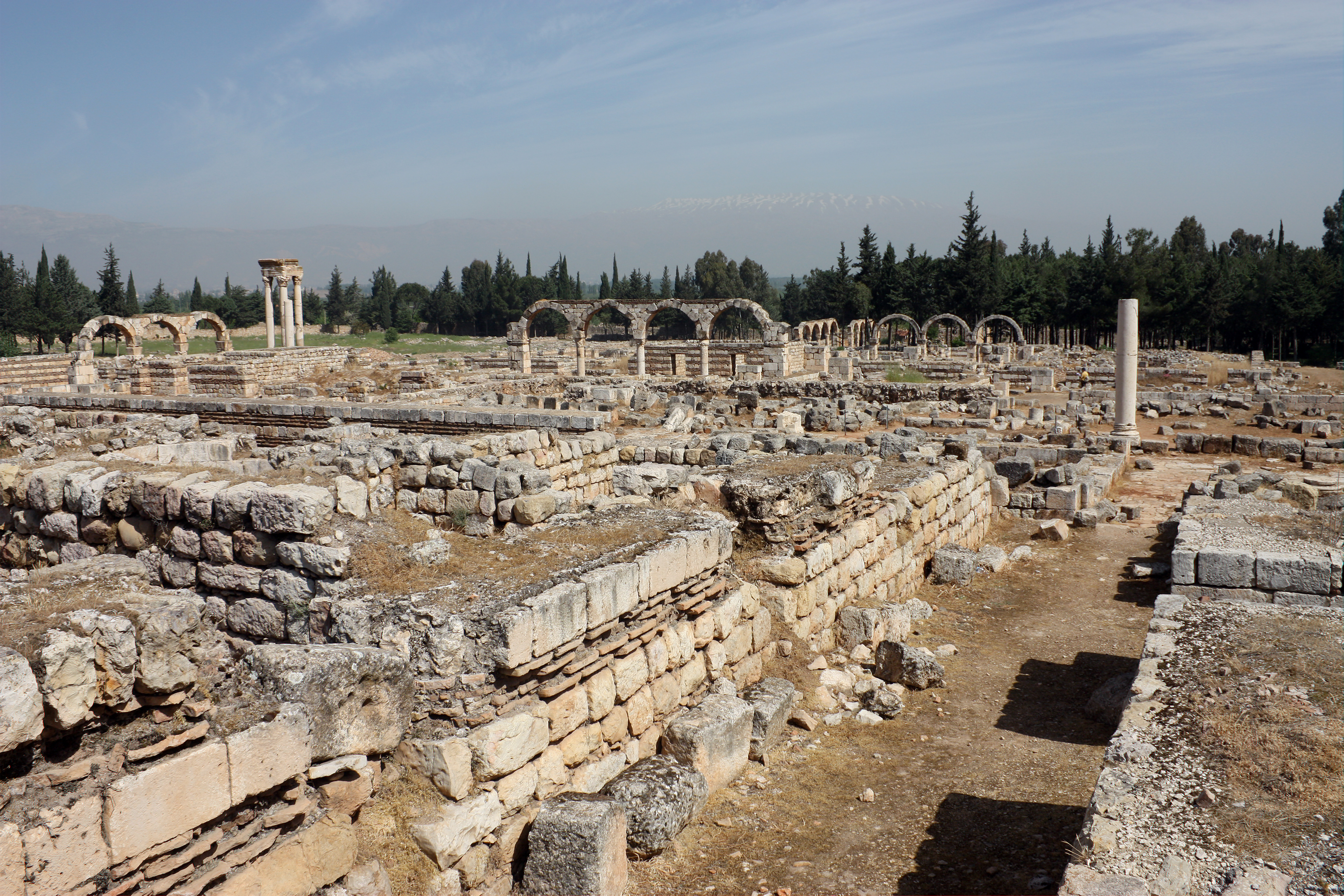
Ruins of Umayyad palace

The Umayyad city ruins cover 114,000 square meters and are surrounded by large, fortified stone walls over two meters thick and seven meters high. The rectangular city design of 370 m by 310 m is based on Roman city planning and architecture with stonework borrowed from the Byzantines. Two large avenues, the Cardo maximum, running north to south, and the Decumanus Maximus, running east to west, divide the city into four quadrants. The two main avenues, decorated with colonnades and flanked by about 600 shops, intersect under a tetrapylon. The plinths, shafts and capitals of the tetrapylon are spolia reused in the Umayyad period. Smaller streets subdivide the western half of the city in quarters of different size.

Main monuments:

- The partially rebuilt Grand Palace, 59 m by 70 m, includes a wall and is preceded by a series of arcades. Its central hosh (courtyard) is surrounded by a peristyle.
- The almost square Small Palace, 46 m by 47 m, stands out for its numerous ornamental fragments and its richly decorated central entrance.
- A Mosque, 45 m by 32 m, is located between the two palaces.
- Thermal baths, built on the Roman model.

== Demographics ==
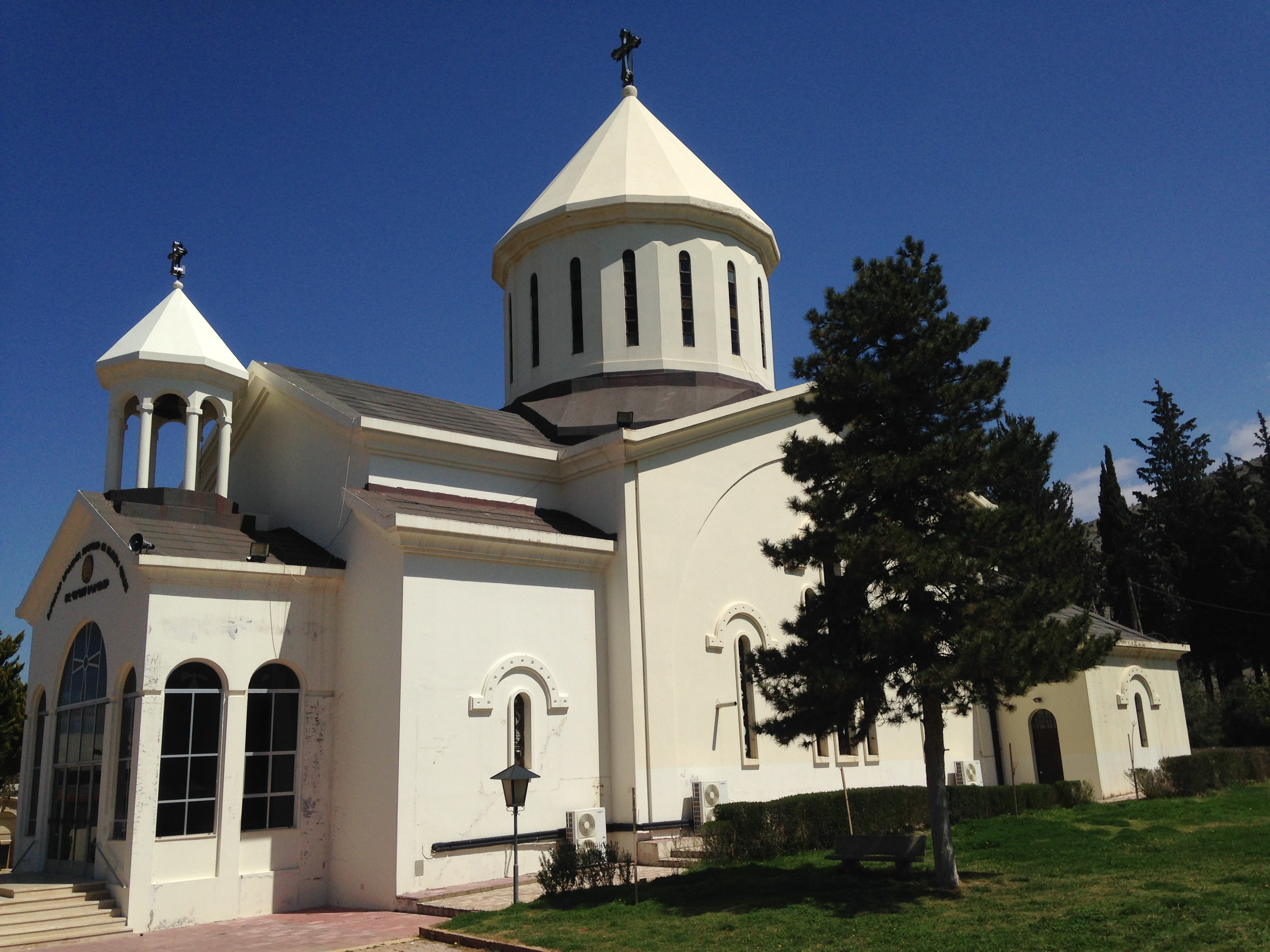
An Armenian church in Anjar

The majority of Anjar's Armenians are Armenian Apostolics (Orthodox) who belong to the Armenian Apostolic Church and Holy See of Cilicia. Armenian Apostolic Saint Paul Church is the second largest Armenian church in Lebanon.

The Armenian Apostolic community has its own school, Haratch Calouste Gulbenkian Secondary School. In 1940, the chief editor of the Armenian newspaper Haratch in Paris, Shavarsh Missakian, organized a fundraising campaign among the Armenians living in France which enabled the building of the "Haratch" Elementary School next to the newly established St. Paul Armenian Apostolic Church. The official opening of the school took place in 1941. The administration of the Calouste Gulbenkian Foundation contributed to the expansion of the school, which was named in honor of Calouste Gulbenkian.

Our Lady of the Rosary Armenian Catholic Church in Anjar serves as church for the Armenian Catholics, who also run the Armenian Catholic Sisters School. In the beginning, the school had two divisions, St. Hovsep for the male students and Sisters of Immaculate Conception for the female students. In 1954, these departments were united. 1973 saw the official opening of the Aghajanian Orphan House, already serving as an Armenian Catholic orphanage since 1968.

The Armenian Evangelical Church of Anjar is in operation to serve Anjar's small Armenian Evangelical community. The Protestant community school was established in 1948 by Sister Hedwig Aenishänslein as part of her missionary work in Anjar. In 1953, the school, which had already become an intermediate school, was promoted into a secondary school. It has day classes as well as boarding facilities for students from other regions who stay there throughout the winter.

== Economy ==
Anjar's economy is mostly based on services, with very few agricultural and industrial activities. The biggest private employer is the company "Shams" (literally "Sun"), a local family-run business that started out as a small restaurant in the 1960s.

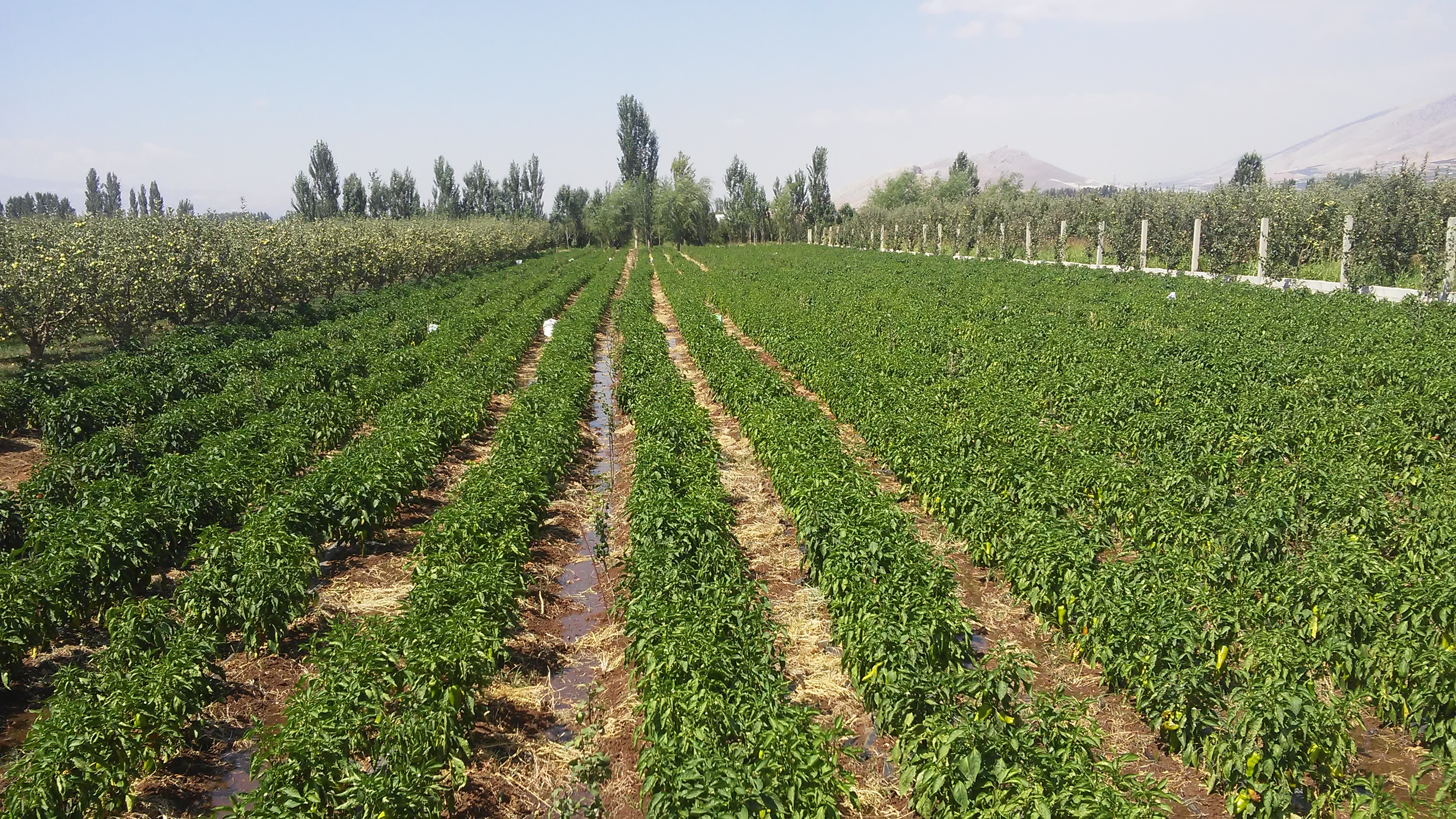
The Anjar gardens provide a relatively small, but important source of income for local residents, with each household being allocated a small plot of land for farming or other purposes.

The municipality is also an important employer. It pays salaries for teachers, public servants, and law enforcement personnel. Unlike the rest of the country, where policing is provided by the central government, Anjar has its own municipal police wearing dark green uniforms and reporting to the municipality instead of the ministry of internal affairs.

== Language ==
Most residents of Anjar are polyglots, speaking Western Armenian, Lebanese Arabic, American English, and the Mousadaghian dialect of Armenian.

The Mousadaghian dialect was the spoken dialect of the Armenians of Sanjak. The Armenians of the region in different villages like Bitias, Haji hababli, Kheder Beg, Vakef, Kebusiye, Yoghun Olukh, in addition to several smaller villages used the Mousadaghian dialect which was called "Kistinek,” meaning "language of the Christians".

== Notable people ==
- Zakar Keshishian, Armenian musician

== See also ==
- Armenians in Lebanon
- Franco-Armenian relations
- List of Armenian ethnic enclaves
- Battle of Anjar
- 8th century in Lebanon

== Gallery ==
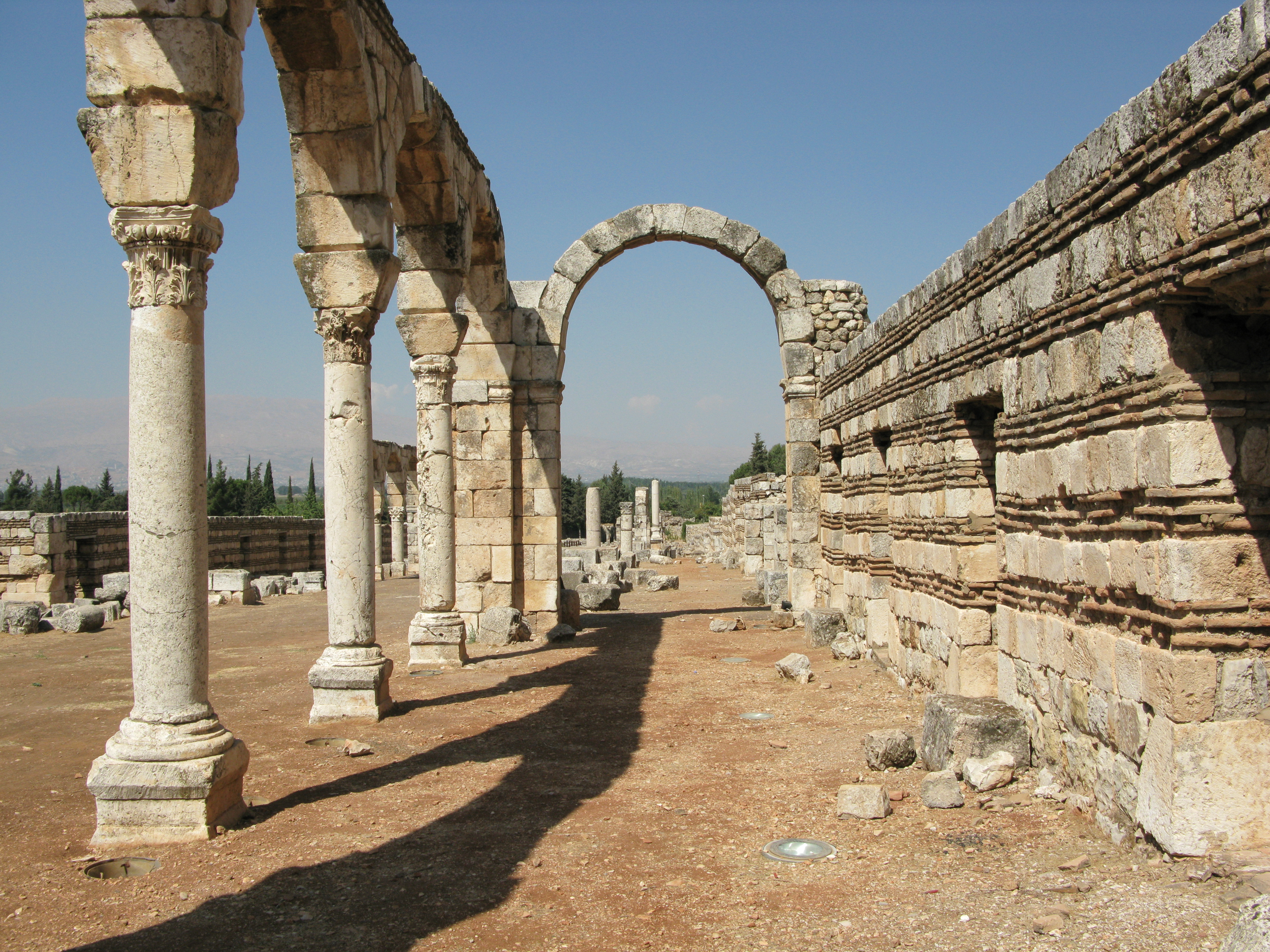
Arches and columns

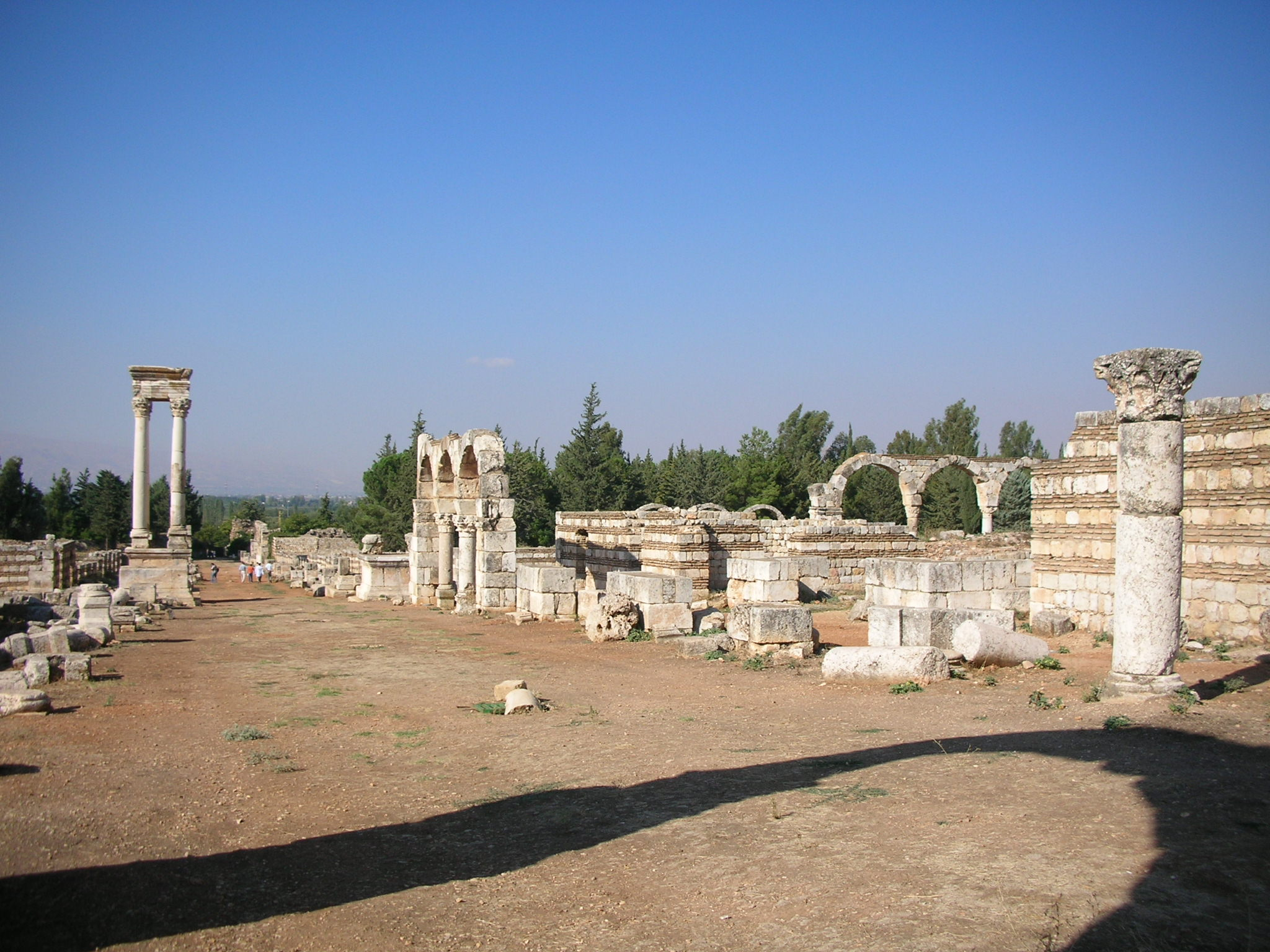
View of site, Anjar

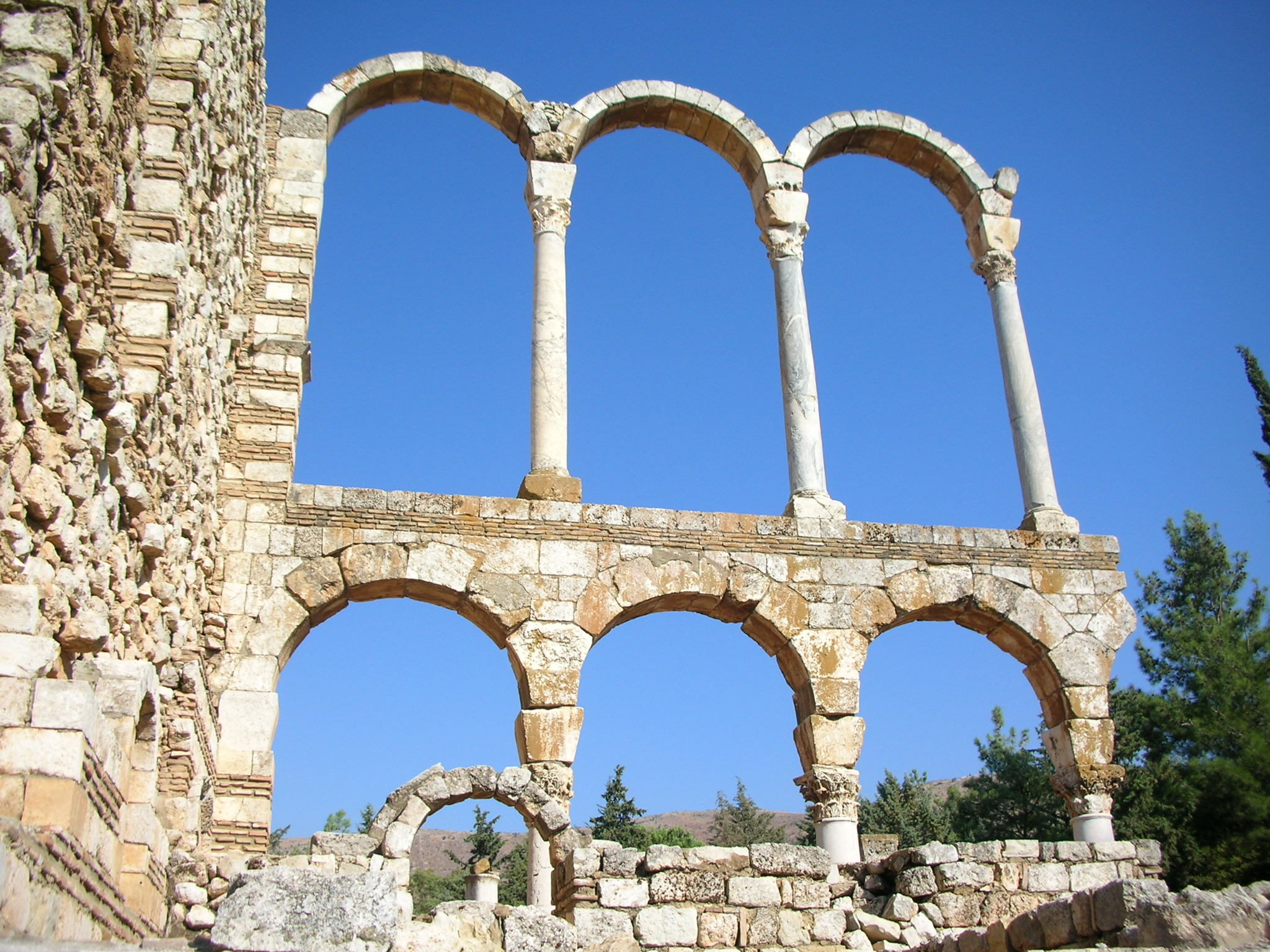
The Grand Palace

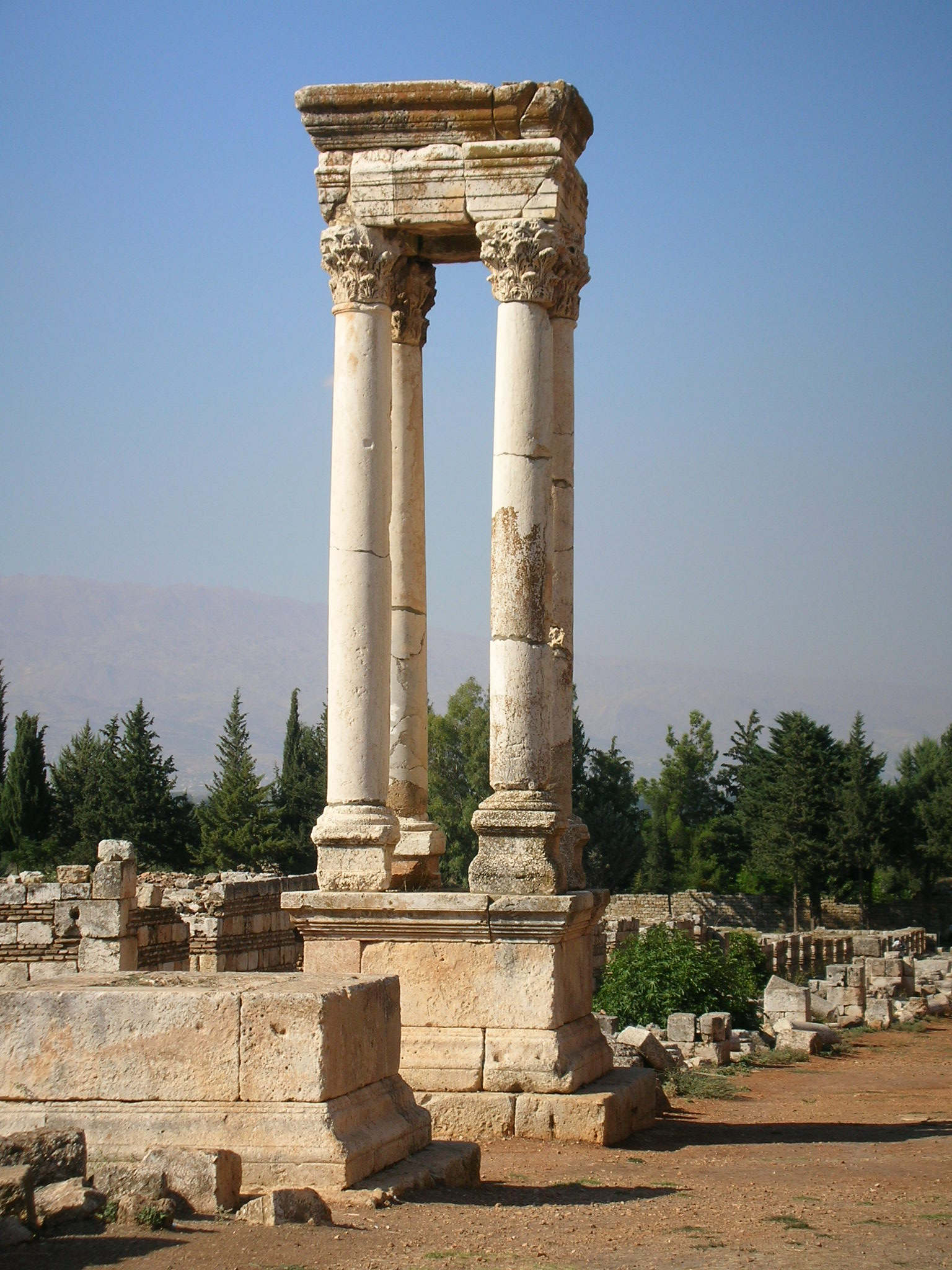
The tetrapylon, Anjar

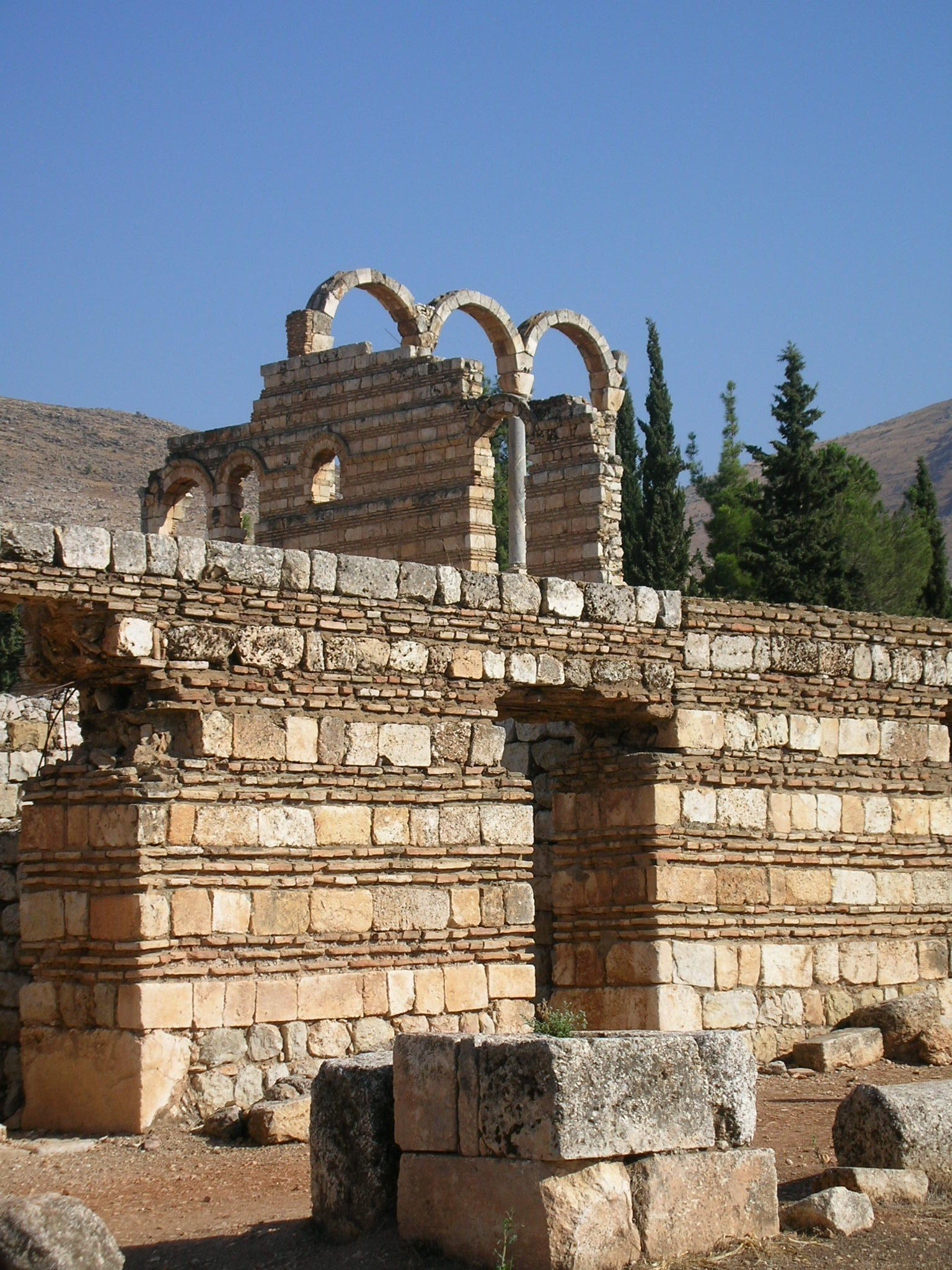
External wall of the Grand Palace, Anjar.

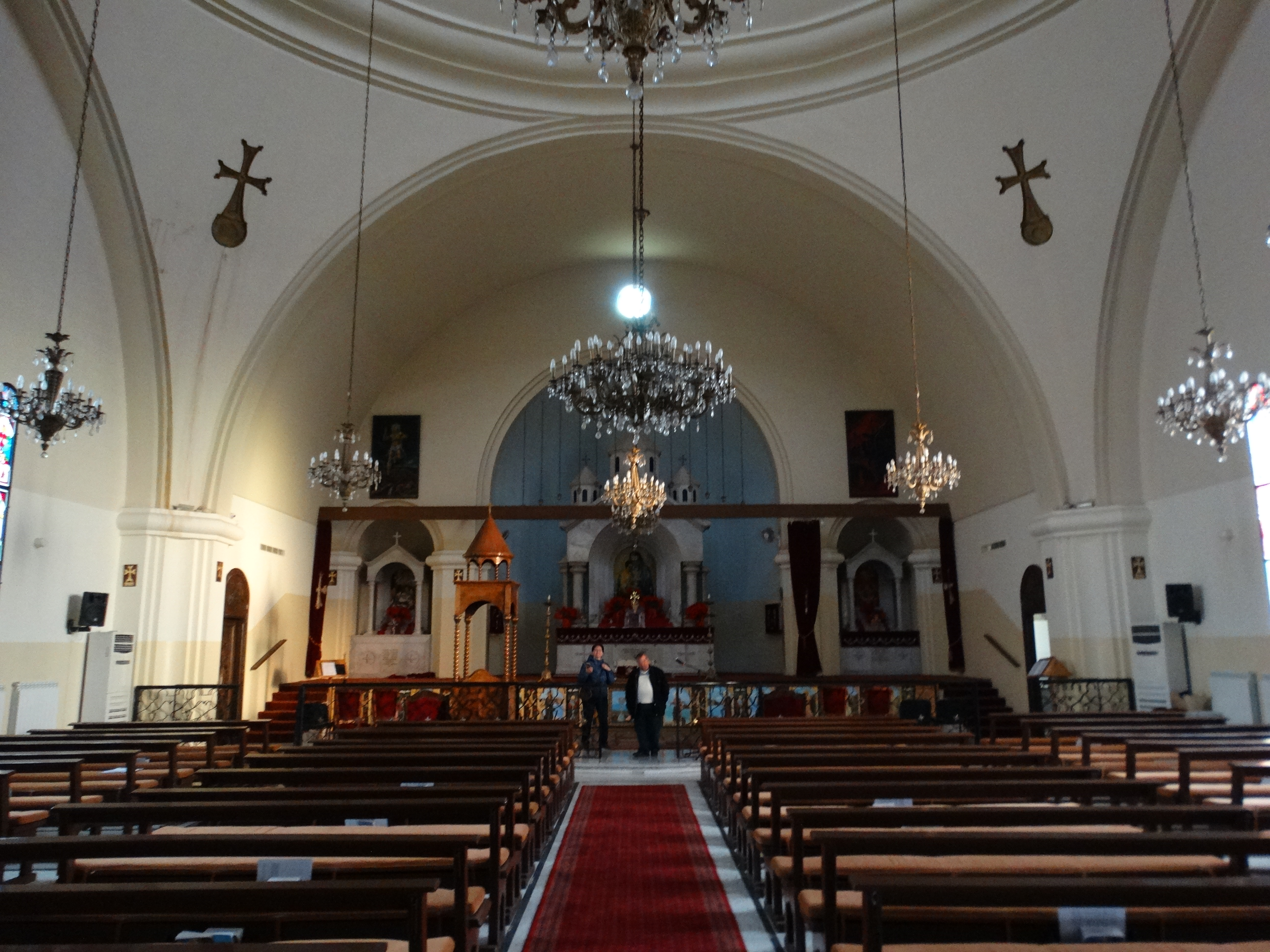
Armenian St. Poghos Church in Anjar (interior view)

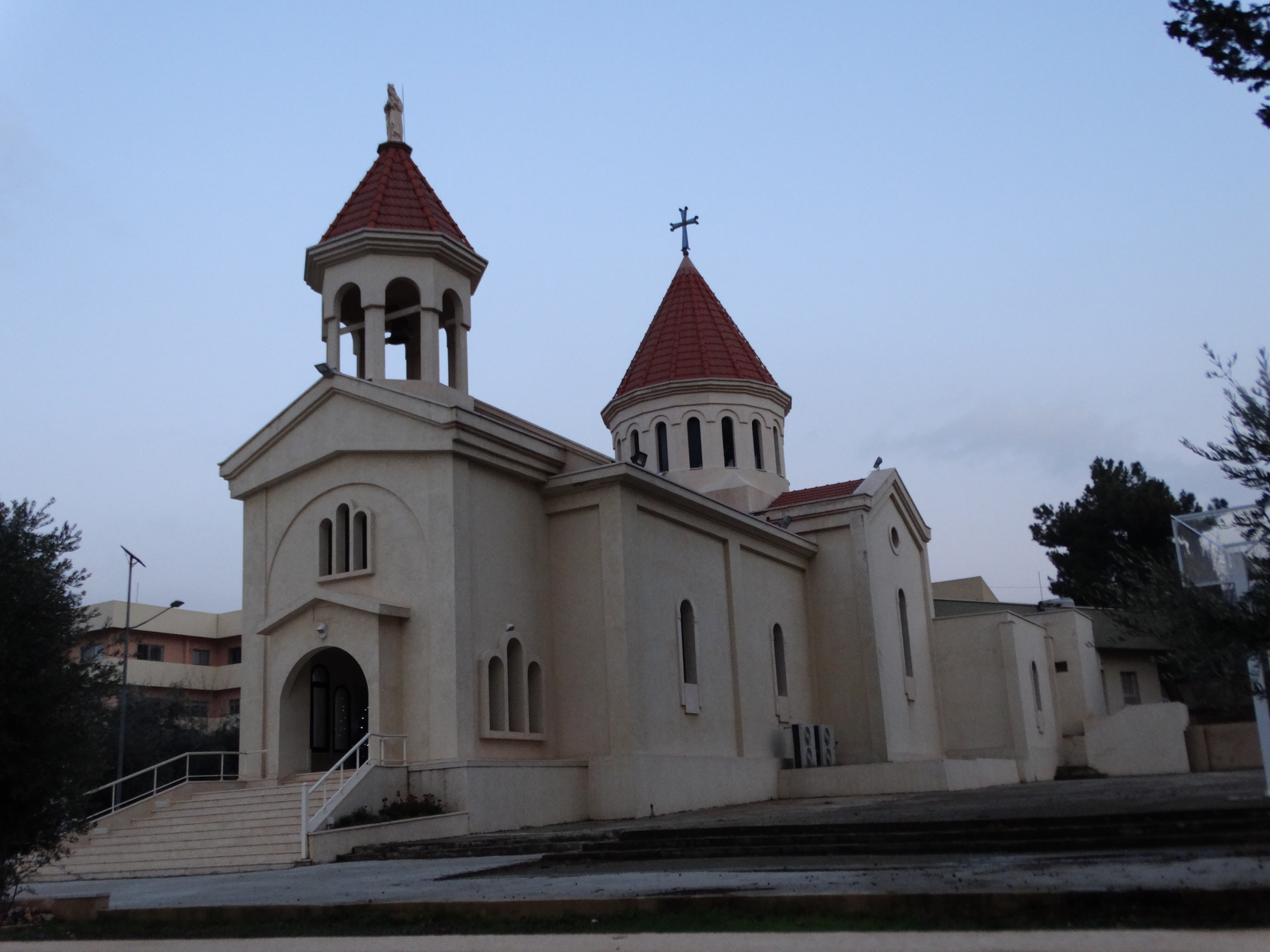
Armenian Catholic Church in Anjar

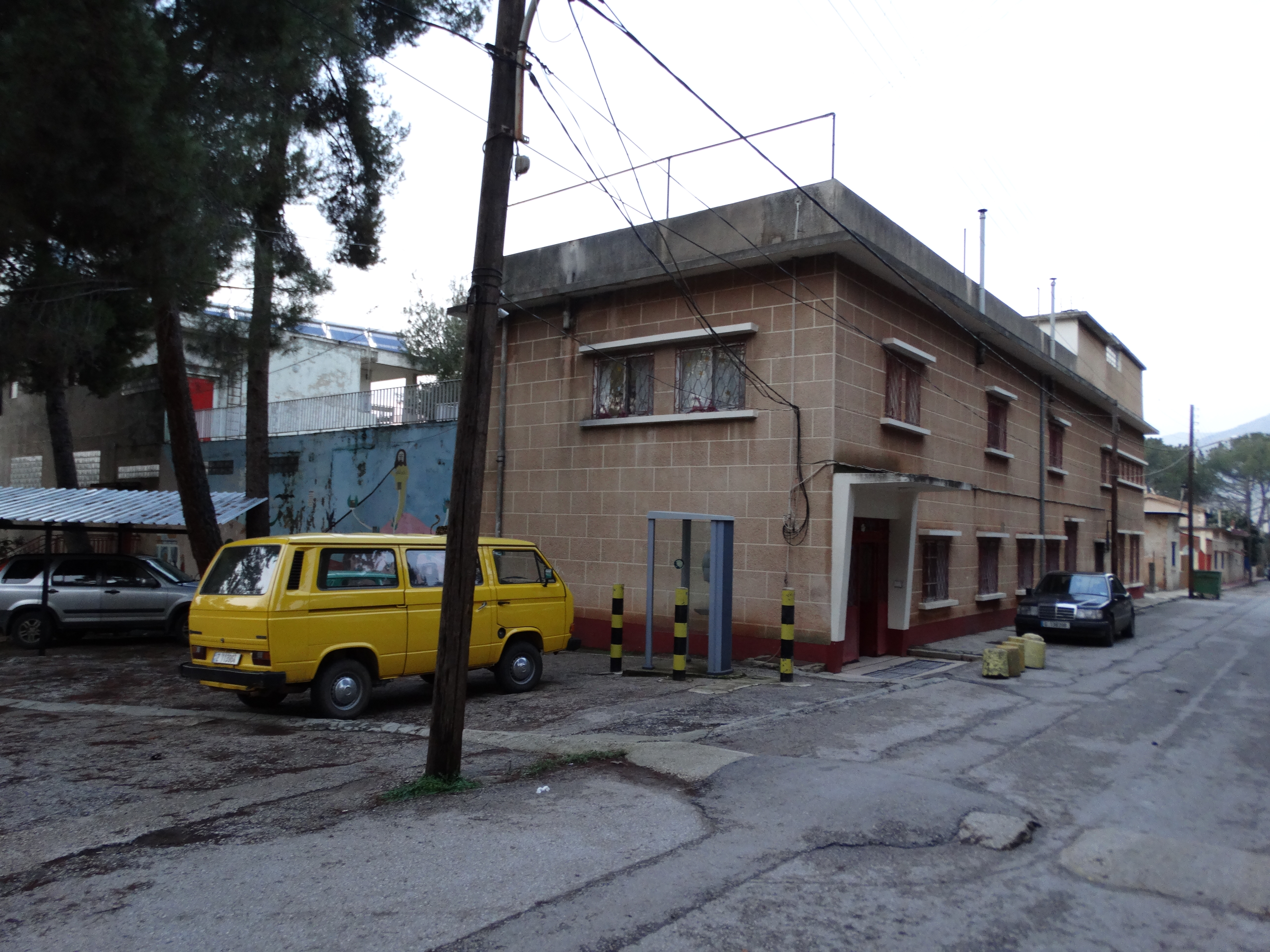
A view of the city

Former public drinking fountain, Anjar, Lebanon.

Saint Paul Armenian Apostolic Church, Anjar, Lebanon (August 2026).

House Museum of Boghos Snabian, Anjar, Lebanon.

Calouste Gulbenkian Hall, Anjar, Lebanon (August 2026).

Naregatsi Street, Anjar, Lebanon (August 2026).

Entrance to the House Museum of Boghos Snabian, Anjar, Lebanon (August 2026).

== Bibliography ==
- Bacharach, Jere L. (1996). "Marwanid Umayyad Building Activities: Speculations on Patronage". In Necipoğlu, Gülru (ed.). Muqarnas: An Annual on the Visual Culture of the Islamic World. Vol. 13. Leiden: BRILL. pp. 27–44. ISBN 90-04-10633-2.
