= Levon Shant =

Armenian poet

Levon Shant Լեւոն Շանթ
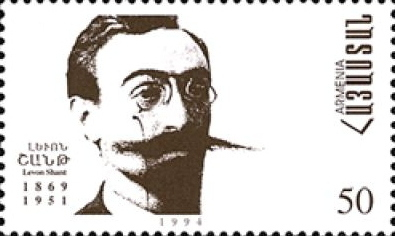
- Born: 6 April 1869; Constantinople, Ottoman Turkey
- Died: 29 November 1951 (aged 82); Beirut, Lebanon
- Occupations: Playwright, novelist, poet

Levon Shant born Levon Nahashbedian, then changed to Levon Seghposian; 6 April 1869 – 29 November 1951) was an Armenian playwright, novelist, poet and founder of the Hamazkayin Armenian Educational and Cultural Society.

== Biography ==
He was a lifelong member of the Armenian Revolutionary Federation and is the namesake of the ARF's Shant Student Association. He attended Armenian school at Scutari (Uskudar) until 1884 and then went to the Gevorgian seminary at Echmiadzin until 1891. He returned to Constantinople to teach and write; his first literary work was accepted by the daily Hairenik of that city in 1891. He departed to Germany in 1893 for six years to study science, child psychology, education, literature and history in the universities of Leipzig, Jena and Munich. Afterwards he returned to Constantinople, where he continued working as a teacher.

He was one of the vice-presidents of the Armenian Parliament during the Republic and led a delegation to Moscow in April 1920 to negotiate with the communist regime. He left Armenia after its sovietization in 1921, and settled in Paris, Cairo, and eventually in Beirut. He was one of the founders of the Hamazkayin cultural association in Cairo (1928). The next year, he was founding principal of the Nshan Palandjian Djemaran (College), Beirut, from 1929 until his death.

As an author, he was most renowned for his plays: Hin Astvadsner ('Ancient Gods', 1908), Kaisre ('The Emperor', 1914), Inkads Berdi Ishkhanuhin ('The Princess of the Fallen Castle', 1921), Oshin Payl (1929). One of many authors banned in Armenia for his political views, a volume of his plays was exceptionally published in Soviet Armenia in 1968. Levon Shant is regarded by many as the greatest Armenian playwright. His plays The Emperor and Ancient Gods remain among the most frequently staged Armenian dramas. The latter revolutionized the Armenian literary world when it was premiered in Tiflis in 1913. Translated into English, German, Italian, French, and Russian, it was directed by Konstantin Stanislavski in 1917.

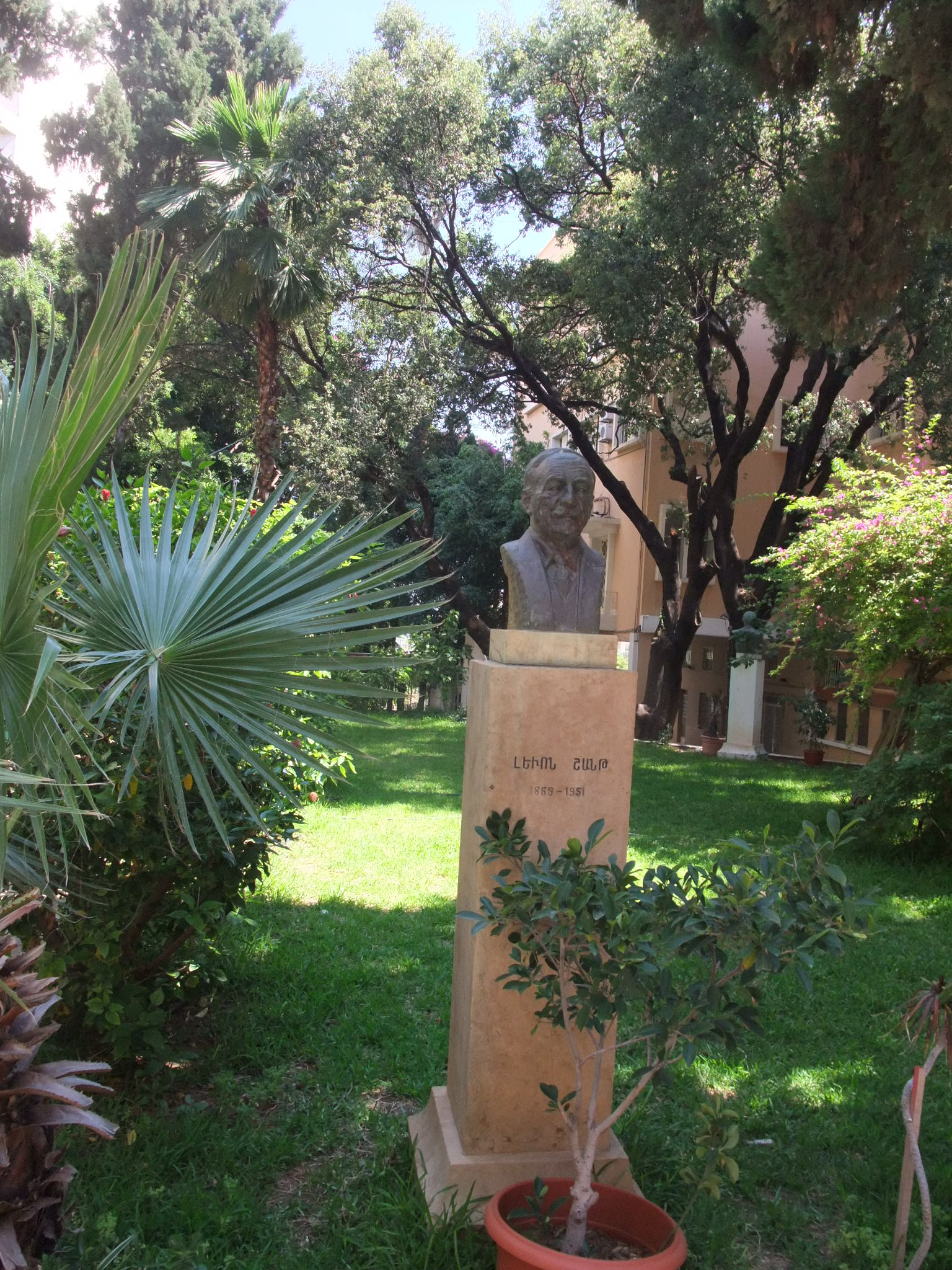
Bust to Levon Shant in front of Nshan Palanjian Seminary, building N 1

== Works ==
- The Egoist («Եսի մարդը»), 1901
- For Someone Else («Ուրիշի համար»), 1903
- On the Road («Ճամբուն վրայ»), 1904
- Ancient Gods («Հին աստուածներ»), 1908
- The Princess of the Fallen Castle («Ինկած բերդի իշխանուհին»)
- The Emperor («Կայսրը»), 1916
