= Hagop Oshagan =

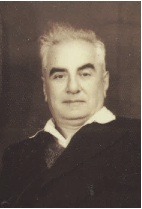
- Born: Hagop Kufejian; December 9, 1883; Soloz, Bursa
- Died: February 17, 1948 (aged 64); Aleppo
- Occupations: writer, playwright, and novelist
- Children: Vahé Oshagan (1921-2000)

Hagop Oshagan (Armenian: Յակոբ Օշական; December 9, 1883, in Soloz, Bursa – February 17, 1948, in Aleppo), was an Armenian writer, playwright, and novelist. Among his many novels are the trilogy To One Hundred and One Years (Հարիւր մէկ տարուան), The Harlot (Ծակ պտուկը), and his best-known work, Remnants (Մնացորդաց, 3 vols., 1932-1934), parts of which have been translated into English by G.M.Goshgarian.

== Biography ==
Oshagan was born in 1883 as Hagop Kufejian in Soloz, a village near Bursa. He was spared the fate of many of his fellow writers and managed to elude the Turkish secret police until early 1918, when he fled from Constantinople to Bulgaria, disguised as a German officer. After the armistice, he returned to Constantinople in 1919, where he adopted his literary surname and taught literature. At the end of 1922, he left Constantinople permanently after the arrival of the Kemalist forces. He lived briefly in Plovdiv, Bulgaria, and then worked as an instructor of Armenian literature in Egypt (1924-1928), Cyprus (1928-1935), and Palestine (1935-1948). He died while on a visit to Aleppo, just before a planned visit to Deir ez-Zor, where hundreds of thousands of Armenians had perished during the Armenian genocide. The Armenian Genocide fundamentally defined Hagop Oshagan’s objective of reconstructing his lost ancestral homeland through literature. Writing in exile, he utilized his extensive knowledge of literature and firsthand experience of village life to document Turkish-Armenian relations.

His output as a literary critic and historian is grounded in the Panorama of Armenian Literature (Համապատկեր արեւմտահայ գրականութեան, 10 vols., 1945-1982), which has been used as a textbook in Armenian high schools. He is also the author of shorter, book-length volumes of literary studies.

His son Vahé Oshagan (1921-2000) followed in his father's footsteps. A poet, short story author, novelist, essayist, and literary scholar, he became one of the most important writers and public intellectuals of the Armenian diaspora.

== Select bibliography ==
- Խոնարհները [The Humble Ones], Constantinople, 1920.
- Խորհուրդներու մեհեանը [The Altar of the Symbols], Constantinople, 1922.
- Երբ պատանի են [When they are Young] Constantinople: H. M. Setian, 1926.
- Մնացորդաց [Remnants], 3 vols., Cairo: Houssaper, 1932-1934.
- Ստեփանոս Սիւնեցի [Stepanos Siunetsi], Paris, 1938.
- Հայ գրականութիւն [Armenian Literature], Jerusalem: St. James Monastery Press, 1942.
- Երբ մեռնիլ գիտենք [When We Know to Die], Jerusalem: St. James Monastery Press, 1944.
- Համապատկեր արեւմտահայ գրականութեան [Panorama of Western Armenian Literature], Jerusalem: St. James Monastery Press (vol. 1-5), Beirut: Hamazkayin (vol. 6), and Antelias: Catholicosate of Cilicia (vol. 7-10), 1945-1982.
- Օրն օրերուն, Խորհուրդ մեր ժամանակներէն [Day of Days: Advice from our Times] Jerusalem: St. James Monastery Press, 1945.
- Սփիւռքը եւ իրաւ բանաստեղծութիւնը (Վահան Թէքէեանի առթիւ) [The Diaspora and True Poetry: On the Occasion of Vahan Tekeyan], Jerusalem: St. James Monastery Press, 1945.
- Վկայութիւն մը [A Testimony], Aleppo: Ani, 1946.
- Քաղհանք [Harvest], Jerusalem: St. James Monastery Press, 1946.
- Արեւելահայ բանասիրութիւնը եւ Էջմիածին [Eastern Armenian Philology and Ejmiatsin], Antelias: Catholicosate of Cilicia, 1948.
- Խոնարհները [The Humble Ones], Beirut: Ani, 1958.
- Երկեր [Works], Antelias: Catholicosate of Cilicia, 1973.
- Երկեր [Works], Yerevan: Sovetakan Grogh, 1980.
- Նամականի [Letters], vol. I, Beirut: Altapress, 1983.
- Մայրիներու շուքին տակ [Under the Shade of the Cedars], Beirut: Altapress, 1983.
- Սիւլէյման Էֆէնտի [Suleyman Efendi] Antelias: Catholicosate of Cilicia, 1985.
- Մնացորդաց [Remnants], 3 vols., Antelias: Catholicosate of Cilicia, 1988 (vol. 1 trans.: Remnants: The Way of the Womb, translated by G.M. Goshgarian, London: Gomidas Institute, 2013).
- Երեք թատերախաղեր [Three plays], ed. Vahe Oshagan, San Francisco, 1990.
- Հարիւր մէկ տարուան [One Hundred and One Years], ed. Boghos Snabian, Antelias: Catholicosate of Cilicia, 1997.
