= Garo Sassouni =

Garo Sassouni (Armenian: Կարօ Սասունի; 1889 – 1977) was an Armenian intellectual, author, journalist, revolutionary, educator, and public figure.

Garo Sassouni was born in the village of Aharonk in the Khulb canton of historical Sasun province and was a relative of famed Armenian revolutionary fighter Hrayr Dzhoghk. He graduated from Mekhitarist institutions in Mush, then received a law degree from the University of Constantinople. He then became an active participant of the Armenian revolutionary movement. He became a member of the parliament of the Independent Republic of Armenia and a provincial governor.

After the fall of the republic he went abroad and became a leader of the Revolutionary Committee of the Armenian Revolutionary Federation. He wrote a large number of Armenian-language historical and cultural studies. He was founding editor of Pakin literary magazine. He died in Beirut, Lebanon at the age of 88.
