= Vahé Oshagan =

Armenian poet, writer and literary critic

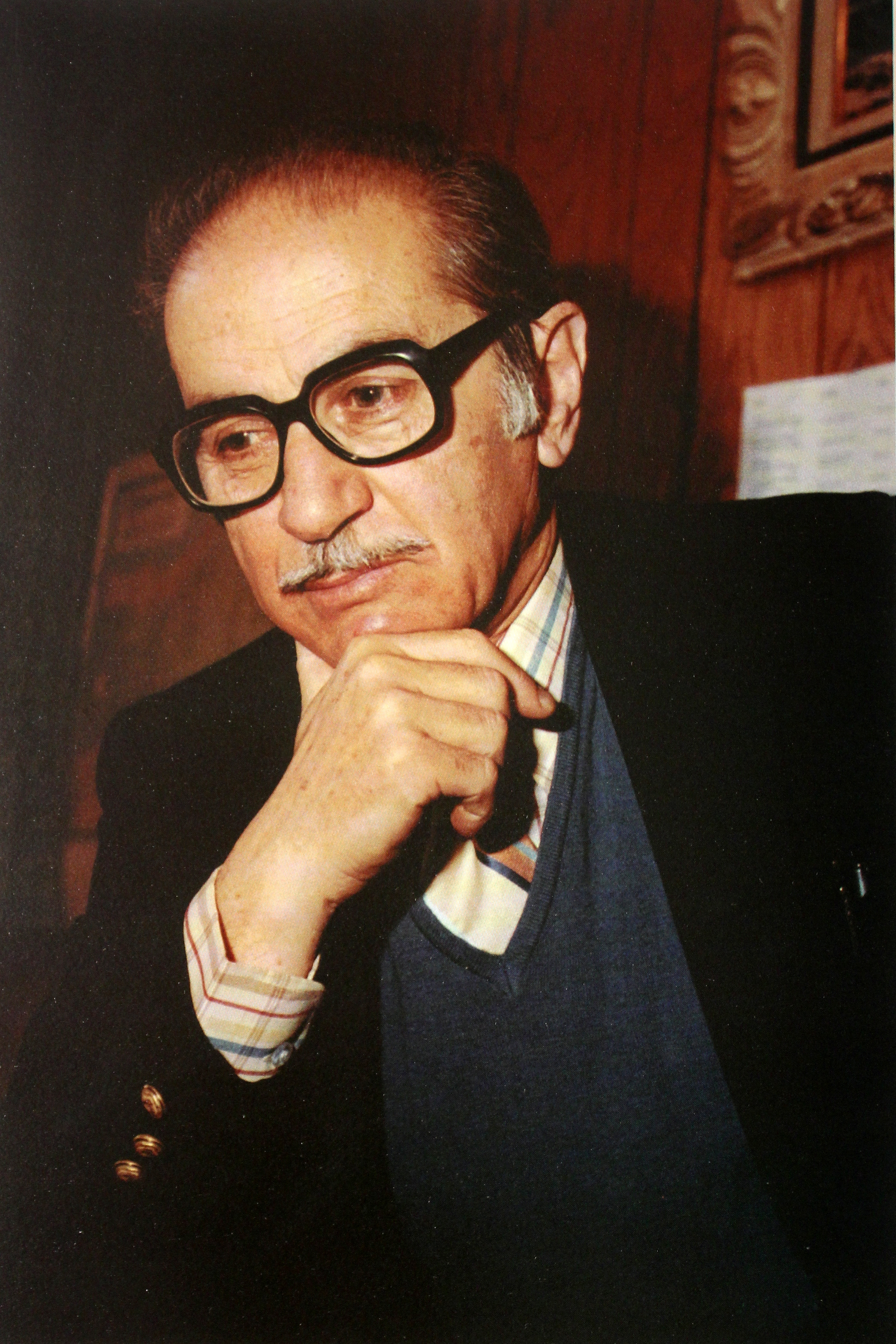
- Born: 1922; Plovdiv, Bulgaria
- Died: June 30, 2000 (aged 77–78); Philadelphia, Pennsylvania, U.S.
- Occupations: poet, writer, and literary critic
- Spouse: Arsine Oshagan (m. 1978)
- Children: 2
- Father: Hagop Oshagan

Vahé Oshagan (Armenian: Վահէ Օշական; 1922 – June 30, 2000) was an Armenian poet, writer, and literary critic.

== Life ==
Vahé Oshagan was born in Plovdiv, Bulgaria, in 1922. His father, Hagop Oshagan, was a prominent writer and critic. Raised in Cairo, Jerusalem, and Cyprus, he studied in France and received a doctorate in comparative literature from the University of Sorbonne, in Paris.

Like many Armenians, whose villages and homes were destroyed by the Turks in 1915, Oshagan drifted throughout the Middle East and Europe, never finding a permanent home. He lived in Beirut after 1952 and taught philosophy and psychology, as well as Armenian, French and English literature. He was again uprooted at the start of the Lebanese civil war in 1975 and forced to move to Philadelphia, where he taught at the University of Pennsylvania from 1976 to 1982. The American cityscape became a focus of his work, as exemplified by his volume Alert (Ահազանգ) (1980).

In the 1990s, he taught at the university of Stepanakert during the war of Karabagh. He later lectured at Macquarie University in Sydney, Australia, from 1993 to 1998. He was a prolific contributor of the Armenian press in the Diaspora, from Beirut to California, during half a century. His essays on literary, cultural, and political issues may fill several volumes.

Oshagan died of complications after heart surgery in Philadelphia on June 30, 2000, at the age of 78.

== Literary output ==
Vahe Oshagan, who also wrote short stories and novels, "reformed Armenian poetry by rejecting its imposed formality, which shunned the concerns of daily life and themes of alienation and loss." He often wrote in colloquial language and was for many the voice of the Armenian diaspora. His second book, The City (Քաղաքը), published in 1963, became "the most radical book of Armenian poetry in the 20th century," according to Marc Nichanian, a former professor of Armenian studies at Columbia University.

He was heavily influenced by French existentialists and had little time for those who dismissed modernity as a corruption of traditional values. "Oshagan was a living paradox: a rebel, a champion of individual liberty, and a one-man repository of his nation's rich heritage. He saw in the survival and creativity of his people reason to dispel their fears and confusions, and offer real hope for the future." He was also the editor in chief of the literary journal Raft: an Annual of Poetry and Criticism, between 1987 and 1998. The journal published English translations of Armenian poetry, as well as essays and reviews. Many leading critics considered Oshagan the most important Armenian-language poet in exile. Nichanian has called Vahe Oshagan "the most important poet of his generation." According to him, "for a long time his work was not even accepted as poetry. He had a hard time imposing himself as poet."

None of Vahe Oshagan's work has been published in English. A translation of his book Alert by British poet Peter Reading awaits publication.

== Selected works ==
- (1956) Badouhan (Պատուհան (Window))
- (1963) Kaghak (Քաղաք (City))
- (1971) Karoughi (Քառուղի (Crossroads))
- (1980) Ahazank (Ահազանգ (Alert))
- (1983) Khoujab (Խուճապ (Panic))
- (1987) Pakhstagane (Փախստականը (The Fugitive))
- (1988) Tagardin shurch (Թակարդին շուրջ, (Around the trap))
- (1996) Inknoutiun (Ինքնութիւն, (Identity))
