= Artsvi Bakhchinyan =

Armenian academic

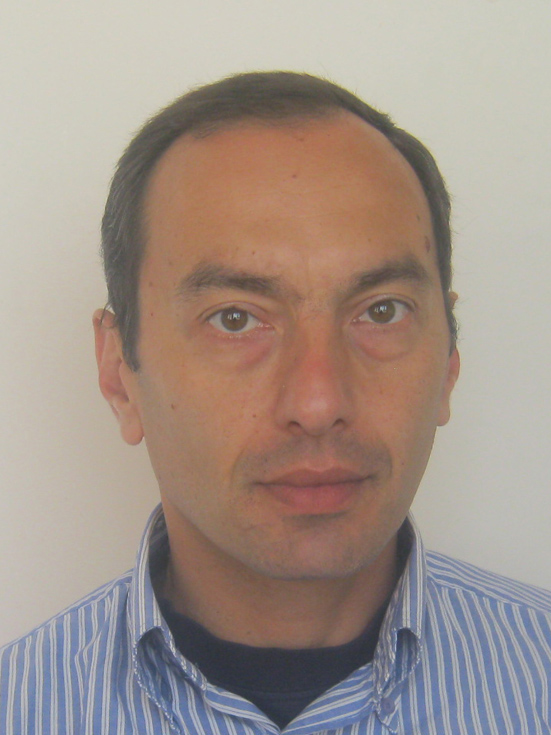
- Born: January 21, 1971 (age 55); Yerevan, Armenia
- Education: Yerevan State University
- Occupations: philologist, film researcher, writer, Armenologist
- Spouse: Ashkhen Bakhchinyan
- Awards: Vahan Tekeyan award

Artsvi Bakhchinyan (Armenian: Արծվի Բախչինյան, born 1971 in Yerevan) is an Armenian philologist, film researcher, writer, Armenologist, and Doctor of philology.

== Biography ==
Artsvi Bakhchinyan received his Diploma in Armenian Language and Literature from the Yerevan State University in 1993. He has been engaged in research on famous Armenians, Armenian art and culture for many years. Bakhchinyan published his first book, They are Armenian by origin, in 1993. The book contained concise biographies of famous Armenians who had lived and worked in foreign countries. The second, revised and completed edition of the book was published in 2002. Since 2001 Bakhchinyan is the Vice-President of FIPRESCI's Armenian branch, a member of jury of international film festivals. He cooperates with the Golden Apricot Yerevan International film festival since its establishment in 2004. Bakhchinyan is the jury coordinator of ReAnimania film festival.

From 1993 to 1996 Bakhchinyan studied in post-graduated masters in Institute of Literature of Armenian National Academy of Sciences (Ph.D. in 1996). In 1993-1996 worked as scientific secretary and bibliographer at National Book Chamber of Armenia. In 1993-1997 worked as executive coordinator of the research program and scientific secretary in Armenian Research Center of Humanities (ARCH). In 1996-1997 he was a guest researcher at the Institute of Afro-Asiatic Languages, Uppsala University, Sweden. In 1998-2000 worked as Arts and Culture/East East/Publishing/Library Programs' Coordinator at the Open Society Institute (OSI), Armenian branch. In 2002-2003 worked as cultural and scientific expert at the Armenian Center for National and International Studies. Since 2009 he is a researcher at the Institute of History, National Academy of Sciences of the Republic of Armenia.

In 2010 he initiated a project to translate Armenian writer Elda Grin's short story "The Hands" into 35 languages for publication in one volume.

Bakhchinyan was also a member of "Hover Chamber Choir", which recorded a songtrack for Atom Egoyan's Ararat.

Bakhchinyan is an author of literary works, including two critically acclaimed novels.

== Awards ==
- 2019 Vahan Tekeyan award in literature, for his Mucik of Armenia, the Outlander novel.

== Selected bibliography ==
- Ծագումով հայ են (They are Armenian by Origin), 1993
- Նապոլեոն Բոնապարտը եւ հայերը (Napoleon Bonaparte and the Armenians), 2003
- Հայաստան-Սկանդինաւիա. պատմա-մշակութային առնչություններ (՚Armenia-Scandinavia: Historical-Cultural Connections), 2003
- Հայազգի գործիչներ (Prominent Armenians from Ancient Times to the Present), 2002
- Հայերը համաշխարհային կինոյում (Armenians in World Cinema), 2004
- Armenia-Sweden: Historical-Cultural Connections, 2006
- Հայերը համաշխարհային պարարվեստում (Armenians on the International Dance Scene), 2016
- Այլաստանցի Մուչիկ հայաստանցին (Mucik of Armenia, the Outlander), 2017 (translated into Russian, 2019)
- Հնազը Ճահճավան քտա-ից (Hinaz from the Swamp-Urban-Type Settlement), 2019.
