= Adıvar =

Adıvar is a given name and a surname. People with this surname include:

- Halide Edib Adıvar (1884–1964), Turkish novelist and feminist; wife of Adnan
- Adnan Adıvar (1882–1955), Turkish politician, doctor, and writer; husband of Halide

Other

- Adivar (crater), on planet Venus, named in honor of Halide
