= Eupithecia pinkeri =

Scientific classification
- Kingdom: Animalia
- Phylum: Arthropoda
- Clade: Pancrustacea
- Class: Insecta
- Order: Lepidoptera
- Family: Geometridae
- Genus: Eupithecia
- Species: E. pinkeri

Binomial name
- Eupithecia pinkeri Mironov, 1991

Species of moth

Eupithecia pinkeri is a moth in the family Geometridae, described by Vladimir Mironov in 1991 from specimens collected in eastern Anatolia and in the Talysh Mountains. The adults have a wingspan of 18.5–22.5 mm and fly in June and July. The early stages and larval food plant remain unknown.

== Distribution and habitat ==
The species is known from Asia Minor (East Anatolia) and southern Transcaucasia (Talysh Mountains). The type locality is Gürün.

== Etymology ==
Mironov named the species after Dipl. Ing. R. Pinker of Vienna, who collected the Anatolian specimens and who, he wrote, "has made a valuable contribution to the study of Lepidoptera, especially of Geometridae". Pinker died in 1987, before a description could be prepared. This led Mironov to state, "I think that it is my duty to describe this new Eupithecia species and name it after Mr. R. Pinker".
