= Batikian =

Batikian may refer to:

- Ani Batikian (born 1982), an Armenian violinist currently living in the United Kingdom
- Gandzak, Armenia, formerly Batikian, a town in the Gegharkunik Province of Armenia
