= Ani Batikian =

Armenian violinist

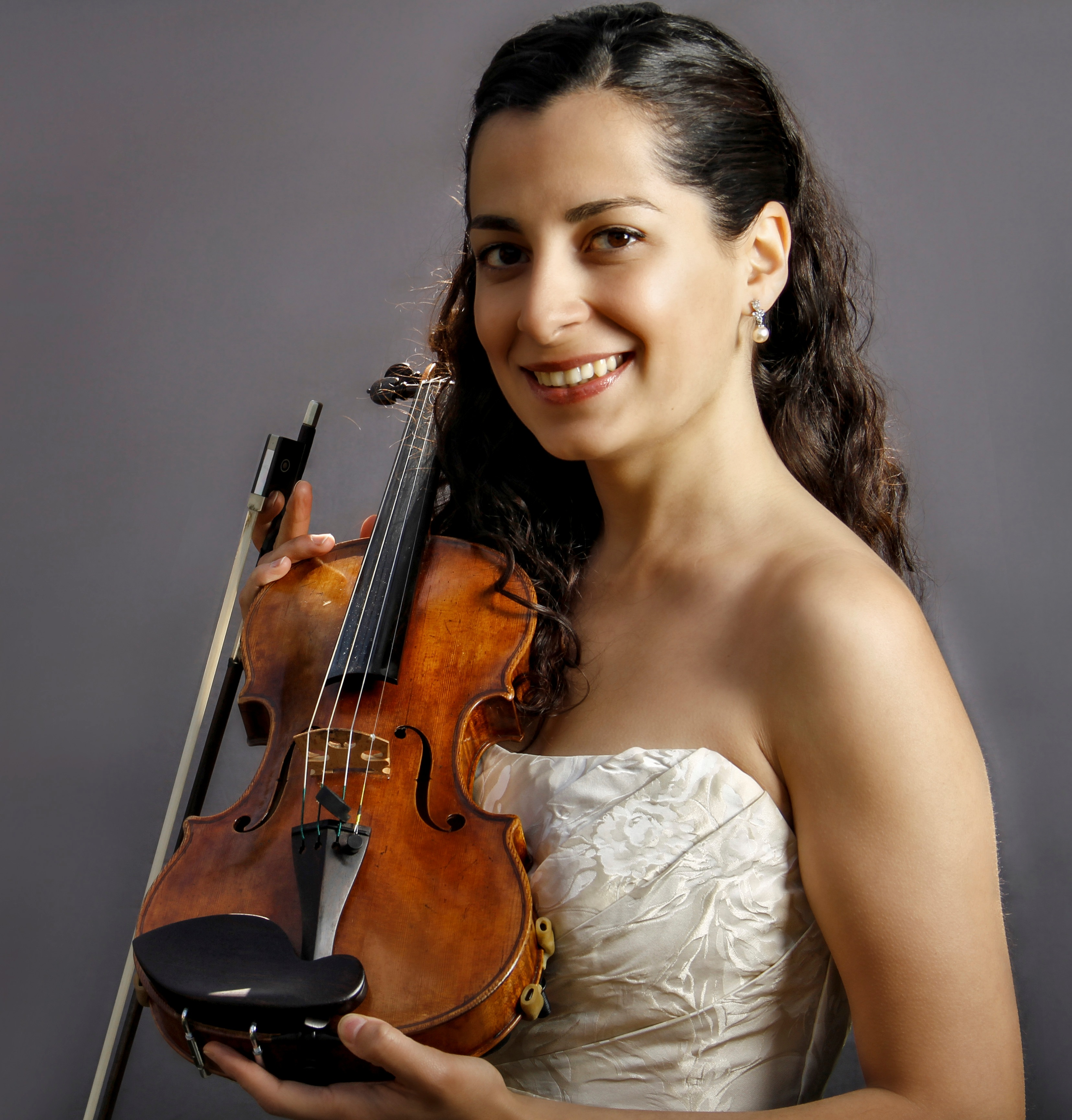
- Ani Batikian 2015

Background information
- Born: November 22, 1982 (age 43); Yerevan, Armenia
- Genre: Western classical
- Occupation: Concert violinist
- Instrument: Violin
- Website: www.anibatikian.com

Ani Batikian (Armenian: Անի Բատիկյան born 22 November 1982) is an Armenian violinist currently living in England.

== Education ==
Batikian started her studies at the Yerevan State Conservatoire in 1998 when she was only 15 years old, and was awarded an undergraduate diploma in 2002, followed by a postgraduate diploma with honours in 2003.

Later through the generous support of Raffy Manoukian she was awarded a full scholarship to study at the Royal Academy of Music in London where she received the top prize for violin playing. Then in 2006 an International Full Scholarship enabled her to continue her studies at the Royal Scottish Academy of Music & Drama under Professor Peter Lissauer.

Further study took her to Cremona in Italy where she was a student of Salvatore Accardo. Other teachers include Henrik Smbatyan, Peter Lissauer and Hu Kun. She has also received guidance from Thomas Brandis, Tibor Varga, Pierre Amoyal, Zvi Zeitlin and Sylvia Rosenberg.

== Career ==
Ani has received numerous awards and prizes. As a recipient of the Dewar Award, she performed in The Dewar Arts Awards Fifth Anniversary Concert held in the Scottish Parliament. She has been the guest of Sean Rafferty on BBC Radio 3 programme “In Tune” and also broadcast on the BBC Radio Scotland and given solo concerts at Cadogan Hall in London, The National Portrait Gallery in London, Edinburgh's Usher Hall, Oxford's Sheldonian Theatre, Glenn Gould Studios in Toronto, London's St. Martin-in-the-Fields, St James's Piccadilly and St. John's Smith Square. Last year Ani featured as soloist in the opening concert of the Return Festival at the Philharmonic Hall in Yerevan, Armenia.

Ani was also a Violin Lecturer at the Royal Scottish Academy of Music and Drama from 2007 to 2012.

She has recorded a CD, entitled “My Favourite Encores”. The CD includes Armenian and virtuoso violin music.

In 2017, her concert in Cadogan Hall, London with the London Phoenix Orchestra included the world première of a piece by Roland Roberts, Batikian's composer husband. The event was organised by the Tekeyan Cultural Association of London.

== Awards and prizes ==
Batikian has won many prizes including:

- Hilda Bailey Prize
- David Knox Memorial Prize
- Dunbar-Gerber Prize
- Mabel Glover String Quartet Prize
- Governors’ Prize for Chamber Music
- Wilfred Parry Prize
- Marjorie Hayward Prize
- Dewar Arts Award prize (2007)
