= Salih Zeki =

Ottoman mathematician and astronomer

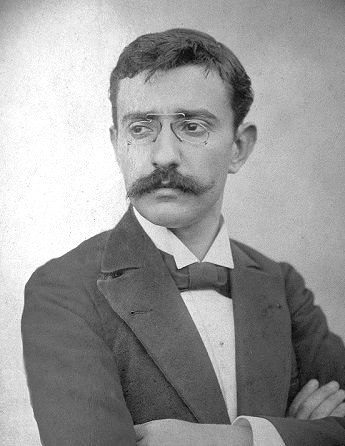
- Salih Zeki (1864–1921)
- Born: 1864; Istanbul, Ottoman Empire
- Died: July 2, 1921 (aged 56–57); Istanbul, Ottoman Empire
- Education: Darüşşafaka High School; École Polytechnique
- Known for: Asar-i Bakiye (The Remainder of Ancient Works)
- Spouse: Halide Edib Adıvar (m. 1901; div. 1910)
- Scientific career
- Fields: Mathematics, Astronomy, History of science

Salih Zeki Bey (1864, Istanbul – 1921, Istanbul) was an Ottoman Turkish mathematician and astronomer, and the founder of the mathematics, physics, and astronomy departments at Istanbul University.

He was sent by the Post and Telegraph Ministry to study electrical engineering at the École Polytechnique in Paris. He returned to Istanbul in 1887 and started working at the Ministry as an electrical engineer and inspector. He was appointed as the director of the state observatory (Ottoman Turkish: رصدخانه‌يي امیره, romanized: Rasathâne-i Âmire) (now Kandilli Observatory) after Coumbary in 1895. In 1912, he became Under Secretary of the Ministry of Education and in 1913 the president of Istanbul University. In 1917, he resigned as the president but continued teaching at the university in the Faculty of Sciences until his death.

== Works ==
=== Astronomy ===
- New Cosmography
- Abridged Cosmography

=== Physics ===
- Hikmet-i Tabiiyye
- Mebhas-ı Elektrik-i Miknatisi
- Mebhas-ı Hararet-i Harekiye

=== History of science ===
- Asar-ı Bakiye

=== Mathematics ===
- Kamus-i Riyaziyat
- Hendese-i Tahliliye
- Hesab-i Ihtimali
