= Nor Kyurin =

Nor Kyurin Նոր Կյուրին
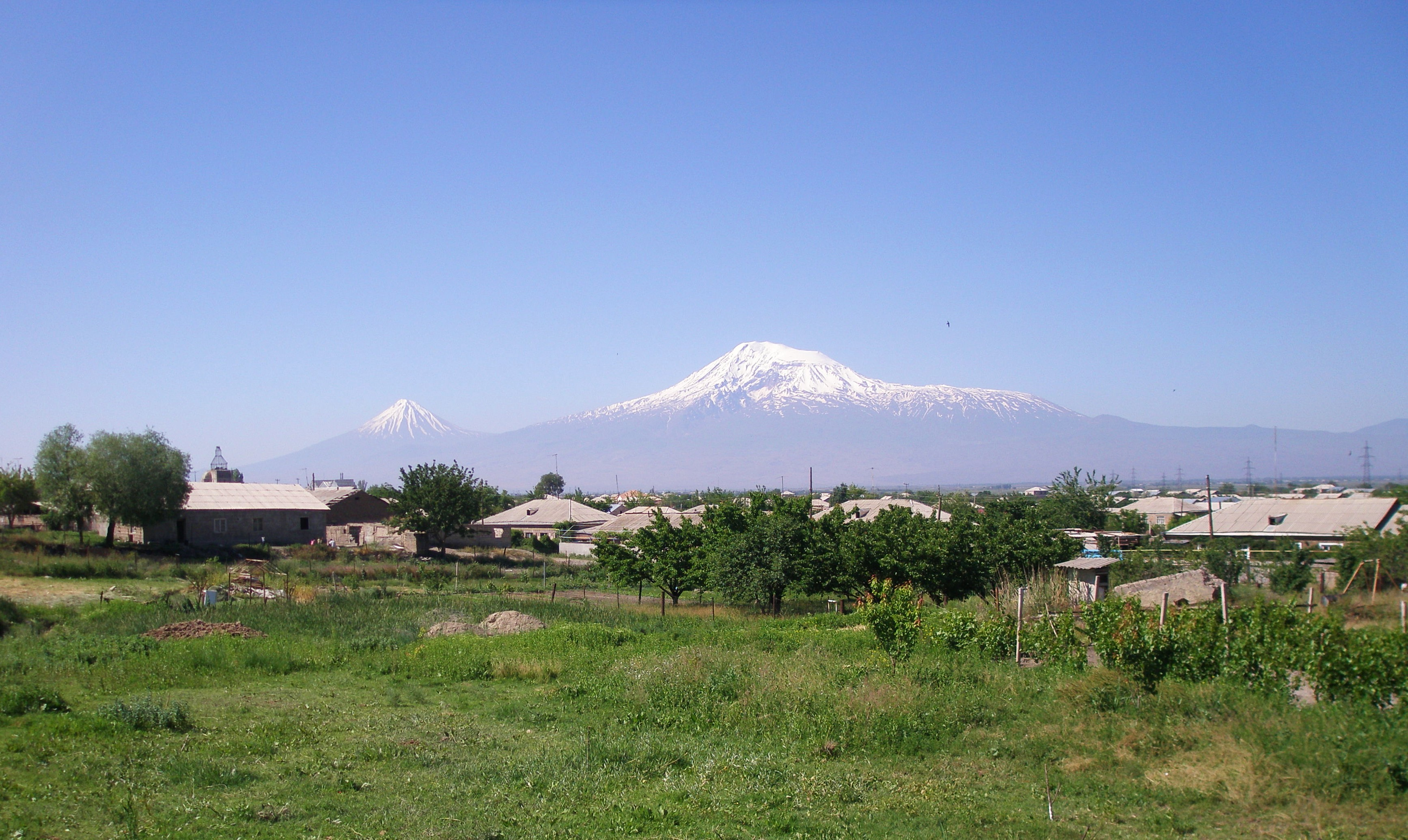
- Nor Kyurin and Mt. Ararat, May 2009.

- Location within Armenia Location within Ararat
- Coordinates: 40°05′26″N 44°27′50″E
- Country: Armenia
- Province: Ararat
- Municipality: Masis

Population (2011)
  - Total: 865
- Time zone: UTC+4
  - Summer (DST): UTC+5

Nor Kyurin (Armenian: Նոր Կյուրին) is a village in the Masis Municipality of the Ararat Province of Armenia. Nor Kyurin means New Kyurin, pronounced [gjurin] or [gyrin] in Western Armenian. It was named after the city of Gürün, which had a significant Armenian population until the Armenian genocide.
