= Adnan Adıvar =

Turkish politician (1882–1955)

Dr. Abdülhak Adnan Adıvar
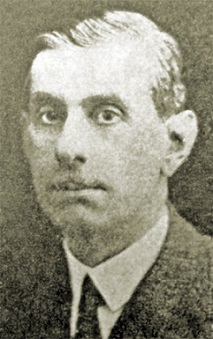
- Born: Abdülhak Adnan; 1882; Gelibolu, Ottoman Empire
- Died: 1 July 1955 (aged 72–73); Istanbul, Turkey
- Resting place: Merkezefendi Cemetery, Istanbul
- Education: Istanbul University; Humboldt University of Berlin
- Occupations: Physician, politician, writer and historian
- Spouse: Halide Edib Adıvar

Abdülhak Adnan Adıvar (1882 – 1 July 1955), also known as Adnan Bey, was a Turkish politician, writer, historian, and medical doctor. He undertook original research and wrote on the history of science. He was also an early supporter of the nascent feminist movement.

== Biography ==
Abdülhak Adnan (he adopted the surname Adıvar later) was born in Gallipoli on 6 October 1882 to a Turkish family. His family tree included Aziz Mahmud Hüdayi, a 17th-century Sufi leader who lived in the Üsküdar district of Istanbul. Adnan's father, Mektubizade Bahai Efendi, was a jurist, and his grandfather, Abdülaziz Efendi, was a member of the Encümen-i Daniş, the first Ottoman science academy. Adnan was first schooled at the Numune-i Terakki Mektebi (School of Exemplary Progress), then he enrolled at the Dersaadet Idadisi (today's Vefa High School).

After graduating from the Medical Faculty in 1905, Adnan left for Berlin to specialize in internal medicine. Following the proclamation of the second Ottoman Constitution in 1908, he came back to Istanbul. As he was close to the Young Turks, who had just taken power, he was appointed director of the Medical Faculty at the age of 30. He served in the Red Crescent in Tripoli during the Italo-Turkish War and participated in the Balkan Wars and World War I. In 1917 he married the novelist Halide Edip, who was at the time teaching in Lebanon. According to Armenian genocide survivor Harutyun Alboyajyan, Adnan helped bring Armenian orphans to the orphanage at Collège Saint Joseph in Antoura, overseen by Halide Edip, where they were forcibly converted to Islam and Turkified. Both Adnan and his wife joined the side of Mustafa Kemal (later known as Atatürk) during the Turkish War of Independence. In 1918, when foreign armies occupied Istanbul and the British were deporting Ottoman intellectuals to Malta, he avoided arrest by joining the Kemalist forces in Anatolia. In Ankara, Adnan was named Minister of Health, Ministry of Internal Affairs and the vice president of the National Assembly between 1920 and 1923.

Later he parted ways with Kemal, disagreeing with the new direction the young republic was taking. He opposed the powers given to Kemal by the parliament, fearing that he was going to become a dictator. He founded the short-lived opposition Progressive Republican Party with Ali Fuat Cebesoy, Kâzım Karabekir, Refet Bele and Rauf Orbay. He became the secretary general of the party and did not hesitate to criticize the government. The party was abolished in 1925 on the argument that it backed Sheikh Said Rebellion against the government. Disappointed, after a year of serving as an independent representative, Adıvar left for Vienna to accompany his wife who needed to undergo medical treatment. He was alleged to have been involved in an attempt on Atatürk's life, and even though he was cleared of any wrongdoing, he stayed in exile until 1939. While abroad, he seems to have developed an interest in philosophy and history of science.

He directed the publication of the Turkish edition of the Encyclopaedia of Islam, contributing its introduction and a number of articles. His other significant publication is La Science Chez les Turks Ottomans (Paris, 1939), which can be regarded as a first attempt to present together the activities and accomplishments of Turkish scholars during the Ottoman period. His other works include a Turkish translation of Bertrand Russell's Philosophical Matters (1936), a two-volume work in Turkish on science and religion through history, and many essays and articles on cultural and scientific topics.

After his return to Turkey in 1939, he held various government and parliamentary positions in the early years of the Turkish Republic. He founded the Eastern Studies Society. He was a deputy in the first Turkish Parliament in 1920 and again elected there for the 1946-1950 session as a member of the Democrat Party.

Adnan Adıvar died on 1 July 1955 in Istanbul and was laid to rest at the Merkezefendi Cemetery.
