= Goodbye, Antoura =

Memoir written by Karnig Panian

- First English edition
- Author: Karnig Panian
- Language: Armenian
- Genre: Memoir
- Publication date: 2015
- Publication place: Lebanon
- ISBN: 978-0-8047-9543-2

Goodbye, Antoura: A Memoir of the Armenian Genocide is a memoir written by Karnig Panian, and published in English by Stanford University Press in 2015. The memoir, originally written in Armenian, follows the five-year-old Karnig Panian through the years of the Armenian genocide, through Anatolia and Syria, and finally to the Collège Saint Joseph in Antoura, Lebanon, where the Ottoman Empire Government had established an orphanage to Turkify surviving Armenian children.

The book, in the original Armenian, was originally published in Lebanon. It was translated into English by Simon Beugekian, and published by Stanford University Press on April 8, 2015.

== Plot ==
The memoir begins with descriptions of life in the town of Gürün, in modern-day Turkey. Panian describes his large family and the idyllic childhood he spent in his hometown, where his grandfather owned vast orchards. When Panian was only five years old, World War I began, quickly followed by the beginning of the Armenian genocide. Deportations from Armenian towns and villages began, and soon, it was the turn of Panian and his family in Gürün. Panian describes the deportation and his family's experience as they made their way, through the Syrian desert, to refugee camps in the Syrian cities of Homs and Hama. In Hama, Panian's family has its first casualties, and soon, his mother dies. His grandparents, in order to save him, decide to hand him over to an orphanage outside the refugee camp. Then, from there, the Ottoman authorities move Panian and other boys to the Collège Saint Joseph – Antoura, in Antoura, Lebanon. At the time, the College was a monastery that had been taken over by the Ottoman forces. The orphanage, which was the brainchild of Ottoman Minister of Navy Djemal Pasha and was at least partly administered by the famous Turkish feminist Halide Edib Adıvar, was, in fact, another project of the Armenian genocide: its purpose was to Turkify the hundreds of Armenian children who were virtually prisoners in the institution. Panian narrates how he and his fellow orphans often stubbornly resisted Turkification, despite appalling beatings and starvation rations. Often, he and his friends snuck out into the neighboring fields to steal fruits and vegetables to satiate their hunger. Panian even tells of boys crushing the bones of their peers who had died and had been buried in shallow graves outside the gates, and then mixing the powdered bones with water and drinking the concoction. Eventually, Panian and a few boys escaped the orphanage and sought shelter in a cave in the nearby mountains. After a few weeks of living on the run, the boys decided to return to the orphanage, only to discover that the war was over, their Turkish teachers and caretakers had left, and the orphans left unsupervised. Soon, French and Armenian soldiers (the latter serving with the French forces) arrived, and rescued the children.
