= Liliane Tannoury =

Lebanese TV presenter

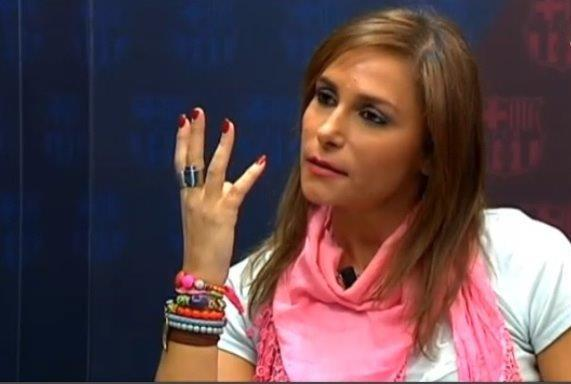
LilianeTannoury

Liliane Tannoury (Arabic: ليليان تنوري) is a senior Lebanese TV presenter. She works as a sports anchor for Al Arabiya TV in Dubai.

== Early life ==
She was born and raised with her brothers and sisters in Zahle, Lebanon. She spent her adolescence practicing basketball and volleyball. She moved to Brazil to study communications sciences in São Paulo, after she graduated from the Collège Saint Joseph, and studied Media at the Lebanese University in Lebanon. She speaks fluent Arabic, French, English, Portuguese and some Spanish.

== Career ==
Liliane began her career as a Sports teacher in Lebanon. Then she started her media career as a reporter in Brazil. She moved to broadcast journalism in 2003 when she joined Al Arabiya TV/Dubai as a sports presenter. She was an instant hit with viewers.

Until 2013, she had a weekly program about English Premier League. The post required a lot of travelling and twice a year she released interviews with key players.

Liliane is the first woman in the Arabic world to present these types of programs. She covered most of the sports tournaments and events around the world namely football world cup (South Africa and Brazil).

She produces, edits and writes her shows, including specials for Al Arabiya.

== Highlights ==
Liliane has conducted exclusive interviews all over the world, talking with Cristiano Ronaldo, Robin Van Persie, Gareth Bale, Gerard Piqué, Xavi, Luis Suárez, Andrés Iniesta, Xabi Alonso and many others.

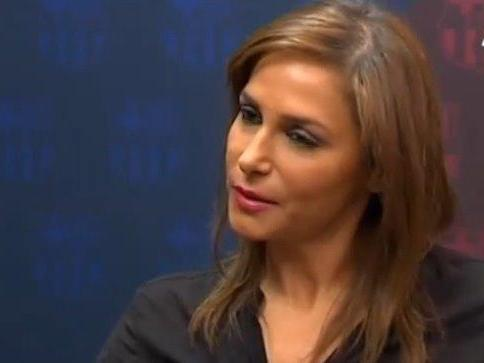
Liliane

Liliane was nominated several times for Television Sports Awards.

== Other activities ==
She hosts galas, sports events, award ceremonies and is a motivational speaker.

Recently she was the official host of the Kuwait Futsal tournament.

She follows the work of International Woman's media Foundation and the work of the Committee to Protect Journalists, foundations that are concerned by the freedom of press and are active in protecting journalists all over the world.
