= Vahe Vahian =

Vahe-Vahian
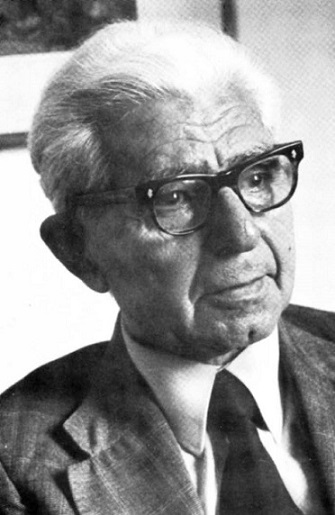
- Vahe-Vahian (1980)
- Born: Sarkis Abdalian; 1908; Gürün, Ottoman Empire
- Died: 1998 (aged 89–90)
- Education: American University of Beirut (1930)
- Occupation: Poet
- Writing career
- Notable awards: "The order of Saint Mesrop Mashtots" by Armenia's Cultural Ministry 1981

Vahe-Vahian (Armenian: Վահէ-Վահեան) was the pen name of Sarkis Abdalian (22 December 1908 – 1998), an Armenian poet, writer, editor, pedagogue and orator.

== Personal life ==
Vahe-Vahian was the fifth son of his parents; Hagop Abdalian, a merchant, and Azniv Vartabedian, who, with his two elder sisters and mother survived the Armenian genocide of 1915. As a kid, Vahe-Vahian had been the ocular witness of the assassination of his two brothers and father, and those atrocious scenes haunted him the rest of his life. After the many vicissitudes of his life, he completed his tertiary studies in 1930, with a BSc in Structural Engineering from the American University of Beirut. The next four years he taught physics and mathematics to the upper classes in Broumana High School, and then, in 1935 he was invited to Melkonian Institute of Education in Nicosia, Cyprus, as lecturer of Armenian language and literature.

In 1936, in Melkonian, Vahe-Vahian met Ashkhen Shadan, a fellow teacher, and got married in 1938. They had three children, Tsolak, Vahram and Shogher.

The death of Ashkhen in 1955 left her husband consumed. Vahe-Vahian, besides his daily occupation as a teacher to meet the needs of his family, was struggling at the time with the publication of Ani, an Armenian monthly of Literature and Art, which was interrupted for a while. In 1968, Vahe-Vahian published a series of poems dedicated to his departed wife under the title of Madean Siro yev Mormok’i (Մատեան Սիրոյ եւ Մորմոքի, Book of love and grief).

In 1957, Vahe-Vahian remarried to Anahid Topjian, and they had a daughter, Sheila. His book of poems, Ghoghanch ou Mrmounch Verchalousayin (Ղօղանջ ու Մրմունջ Վերջալուսային, Twilight chime and murmur, 1990) is dedicated to Anahid for her affectionate and coddling support.

In 1976, Vahe-Vahian's son Vahram died in a car crash He described his shock and grief in a book of 29 poems, Houshartsan Vahramis (Յուշարձան Վահրամիս, Monument to Vahram, 1977). He first learned about the death of his son while travelling around the United States and Canada on a fundraising mission for bereaved Armenians in Lebanon.

In his twenties, Vahe-Vahian had an emotionally intense sentimental life. In the third section "Intimate letters" of the book Panasteghdzin Sirde (Բանաստեղծին Սիրտը, The heart of the poet, 2012), we encounter his first platonic love letter to Mrs. Lucie Potoukian (Tosbath), written at the age of 24. Later, he, with a greater out-pouring of emotions, corresponded with the elder sister of Lucie, Siran Seza, a prose writer and the editor of the newly published Yeridasart Hayouhi (Young Armenian woman), and with Alice Sinanian. From 1946 onwards to his death in 1998, Vahe-Vahian took the decision to live and stay in Lebanon, despite the continuous civil war in the area from 1975 to 1990, with the strong conviction that the dismantling of the Armenian community in Lebanon would be the last blow of mercy to the Armenian diaspora.

== Education ==
His primary education in the local Armenian National School in Gürün was interrupted in 1914 by the deportation. As a child he lived the terror of Turkish atrocities, which was occasionally reflected in his literature.

Surviving the Armenian genocide as an orphan, after having been forced out of Turkey, in 1919 he returned to Aintab at the armistice with his mother, where he attended the local 'Vartanian School'. In 1921 he finally settled in Aleppo (Syria), where he continued his studies at the Armenian Evangelical School, which later became the Aleppo College run by American missionaries. Still eager to learn, in 1925 he enrolled in the American University of Beirut where he gained a B.S. degree in Structural Engineering in 1930.

== Career ==
In 1931, he began teaching mathematics, physics and chemistry at Broumana Senior High School in Lebanon. In 1935, he was invited to succeed Vahan Tekeyan as teacher of Armenian language and literature at the Melkonian Educational Institute in Cyprus.

In the autumn of 1946, he moved to Beirut where he launched the monthly literary and art magazine Ani, acting as its editor for the next 9 years. Ani has served as a pacesetter in modern Armenian literature by introducing new works from Armenia to diaspora readers, and nurturing young talents in the diaspora.

In 1947, he was appointed part-time teacher of Armenian language and literature in senior high schools in Beirut patronised by the Armenian General Benevolent Union (AGBU).

In 1964, he founded the Yervant Hussissian Armenology Institute in Beirut, where he held the position of principal and lecturer of Armenian language and literature. Over the span of a decade, hundreds of Armenian teachers were educated to subsequently pursue their chosen profession at different Armenian institutions all over the world.

Holder of several social and cultural posts in the Armenian community, both in Cyprus and Lebanon, he was invited to Armenia on several occasions in 1946, 1975, 1978 and 1981 to participate in literary conferences, attended university celebrations of outstanding historical events and met with prolific Armenian writers of the time.

First in 1946 then in 1976, he was sent on a mission to the USA and Canada to undertake fundraising activities organised by the Central Committee of AGBU in America on behalf of bereaved Armenians in Lebanon.

In 1970, the Holy See of Cilicia (Lebanon) presented him with the Gold Medal for his prolific career as an educator and a writer. He was also awarded the Order of Saint Mesrop Mashtots by Armenia's ministry of culture for his devotion to Armenian culture and heritage in 1981.

In 1955 and 1978, respectively, he edited and published with detailed prefaces the works of eminent poets Matteos Zarifian and Vahan Tekeyan.

== Works ==
=== Poetry ===
- Արեւ-անձրեւ (Sun-Rain), Beirut, 1933
- Ոսկի կամուրջ (Golden Bridge), Beirut, 1946
- Ոսկի կամուրջ (Golden Bridge - poems, Memoirs and critics), Yerevan, 1958
- Մատեան սիրոյ եւ մորմոքի (Book of Love and Grief), Beirut, 1968
- Յուշարձան Վահրամիս (Monument in memory of Vahram, Beirut, 1977
- Հատընտիր (Selected Poems), Beirut, 1986
- Ղօղանջ ու մրմունջ վերջալուսային (Twilight Chime and Murmur), Beirut, 1990;

=== Prose ===
- Յարալէզներու հաշտութիւնը (The Reconciliation of Arlez-Memoirs from a visit to the Motherland), Beirut, 1953
- Բերքահաւաք (Harvest - Essays in three volumes), Vol. I, Jerusalem, 1978, Vol. II, Beirut, 1987 & Vol. III Beirut, 1993

=== Posthumous work ===
- Հրաժեշտի քերթուածներ (Farewell Poems), Beirut (Lebanon), 2009
- Բանաստեղծին սիրտը. նամակներ (The Heart of the Poet - Private Letters), Beirut (Lebanon), 2012

=== Editing ===
- Հայ գրականութիւնը - պատմուածքներ, Vol. I (An Anthology of Armenian Literature - Short stories, Vol. I) Beirut (Lebanon), 1978
- Ծաղկաքաղ արձակի (An Anthology of Armenian Prose in three Volumes) Beirut (Lebanon), 1984, 1985 & 1988

=== Translated works ===
- Անծանօթ գլուխ-գործոցը (Le Chef-d'Oeuvre Inconnu by Honore de Balzac, from French original), Beirut (Lebanon), 1950
- Մարգարէն (The Prophet by Gebran Khalil Gebran, from the English original), Beirut (Lebanon), 1984
- Պարտիզպանը, Կիթանճալի եւ Մրգահաւաք (The Gardener, Gitanjali & Fruit-gethering by Rabindranath Tagore, from the English original), Beirut, 1985
- Տորիան Կրէյի պատկերը (The Picture of Dorian Gray by Oscar Wilde, from the English original), Beirut, (Lebanon), 1992
