= Hampartzoum Berberian =

Armenian musician and activist

- Համբարձում Պէրպէրեան
- Born: May 25, 1905; Adana, Ottoman Empire
- Died: March 13, 1999 (aged 93); Watertown, Massachusetts, United States
- Citizenship: American (nationalized)
- Education: Athens Conservatory
- Occupations: composer, conductor, activist
- Known for: choral works
- Notable work: see Selected compositions

Hampartzoum Berberian (Armenian: Համբարձում Պէրպէրեան; May 25, 1905 – March 13, 1999) was an Armenian composer, conductor and political activist.

== Biography ==
Born in the Adana province of the Ottoman Empire, Berberian was the youngest of 13 children. During the 1915 Armenian genocide, he fled to Aleppo, Syria, where he found refuge in the local American orphanage. There his musical gifts became evident.

Through Smyrna, he ended up in Greece, where he decided to become a musician. Berberian enrolled in the Athens Conservatory, studying conducting with Dimitri Mitropoulos. He graduated in 1929. In addition to the indisputable gifts as a composer, Berberian was talented as a violinist, conductor and teacher. In 1931, he was appointed Associate Dean to the Hellenic Conservatory in Cyprus, where he built a reputation as a successful composer and conductor.

In 1945, Catholicos Karekin I of Cilicia invited him to Lebanon to serve as music teacher at the Antelias Theological Seminary, as well as in the schools of the Armenian General Benevolent Union. During this time, Berberian composed many works and conducted numerous concerts. He traveled to various cities in the Middle East, Europe, North and South America, disseminating Armenian music generally and his own work particularly. From then on, he also became the musical operative of the Armenian Democratic Liberal Party.

Politically active on Armenian issues, Berberian and several other representatives of the Armenian diaspora met with Nikita Khrushchev in Yerevan on May 7, 1961, during the post-Stalin Thaw. In the meeting, they raised the question of the unification of Nagorno-Karabakh and Nakhichevan with Soviet Armenia. Berberian specifically "expressed hope that 'in a peaceful way, Comrade Khrushchev would make [an] exceptional surprise' for his diasporan guests and for 'the entire Armenian people,' implicitly referring to Mountainous Karabakh."

Berberian moved to the United States in 1962 and became a naturalized citizen in 1968. He lived in Watertown, Massachusetts, and was the director of music ministry at the Holy Trinity Armenian Apostolic Church in Cambridge, Massachusetts. He was honored by many religious leaders and secular organizations for his contributions in music, culture and education. He died in Watertown on March 13, 1999, at the age of 93.

== Selected compositions ==
=== Stage works ===
- Թիթեռ ("Butterfly" - children's opera, 1934)
- Շողիկ ("Shoghig" - opera, 1939)
- Արեգնազան ("Areknazan" - opera, 1940)
- Թամար ("Tamar" - opera, 1995)

=== Orchestral works ===
- "Armenian Maidens," Dance Fantasy No. 2
- Violin Concerto
- Cello Concerto

=== Choral works with instrumental accompaniment ===
- Ուրախ լեր մայր լուսոյ ("Rejoice Mother of Light" - Magnificat Hymn)
- Սարտարապատ ("Sardarapat" - Choral Oration / Paruyr Sevak)
- Խորհուրդ Վարդանանց ("Sacrament of Vartanantz" - Cantata / text by Vahan Tekeyan)
- Ղարաբաղ ("Gharabagh" - Choral Ode / text by Hovhannes Shiraz)
- "Requiem Aeternam" (Text by Yeghishe Charents)
- Սայաթ Նովա ("Sayat Nova" - Choral Ode / text by Yeghishe Charents)
- Եկեղեցին հայկական ("The Armenian Church" - Oratorio / text by Vahan Tekeyan)
- "Lincoln at Gettysburg" - Choral Oration
- Աղօթք վաղուան սեմին առջեւ ("Prayer on the Threshold of Tomorrow - Cantata / text by Vahan Tekeyan)
- "Resurrection" - Cantata Sacra
- 4 Նայիրեան խմբերգներ - Հայաստանի գովքը, Գութաներգ, Խօսք իմ որդուն, Հայոց համբարձումը ("Four Ballades from Nayiri": "Ode to Armenia" / text Yeghishe Charents, "Harvest Song" / text by Chituni, "A Word to My Son" / text by Silva Kaputikyan, "Ascension of Armenians" / text by Fr. Sarhadian)

=== Choral works ===
- Սարերի աղջիկ ("The Mountain Girl" / text by Fr. Sarhadian)
- Գիւղացի գեղեցկուհին ("Beauty of Villages" / text by Fr. Sarhadian)
- Խաչը ("The Cross" - Motet / text by Yeghishe Tourian)

=== Songs with piano ===
- Սէր մը գաղտնի ("The Secret Love" / text by Vahan Tekeyan)
- Կ՚անձրևէ տղաս ("It's Raining My Son" / text by Vahan Tekeyan)
- Ոսկի երազ ("The Golden Dream" - duet / text by Mihran Damadian)
- Սիրտս ("My Heart" / text by Hmayeak Arekents)
- Աչքերդ ("Your Eyes" / text by Sibil)
- Սէր ("Love" / text by Zareh Melkonian)
- Սիրերգ ("Love Song")
- Հասուն արտ ("Ripe Harvest" / text by Daniel Varoujan)
- Շէկլիկ աղջիկ ("The Blonde Maiden" / text traditional)
- Անոր ("To Her" / text by Tlgadintsi)
- Երգ Հայաստանի ("Ode to Armenia" / text by Azad Vshduni)
- 8 Աշուղական խաղեր, Սայաթ Նովայի խօսքերով ("8 Art Songs in Troubadour Style" / text by Sayat-Nova)
- 5 Նայիրեան երգեր - 1. Գիւղ հայրենի, 2. Զմրուխտ սարից հովեր կու գան, 3. Վարուժնակիս, 4. Գողթան երգը, 5. Լուսաւորչի կանթեղը ("5 Art Songs from Nayiri": 1. "Native Village" / text by Yeghivart; 2. "Winds from Emerald Hills" / text by Hovhannes Shiraz; 3. "To My Little Varoujan" / text by Daniel Varoujan; 4. "Bardic Song from Goght" / text by K. Ipekian; 5. "The Lamp of the Illuminator" / text by Hovhannes Tumanyan)

=== Organ ===
- Ուրախ լեր ("Rejoice O Holy Church" based on Medieval chant by Catholicos Sahak III of Dzorapor)
- Խորհուրդ խորին ("O Mystery Deep" based on Medieval chant by Khachatur of Taron)
