= Vahan Tekeyan =

Armenian poet and public activist

Vahan Tekeyan Վահան Թէքէեան
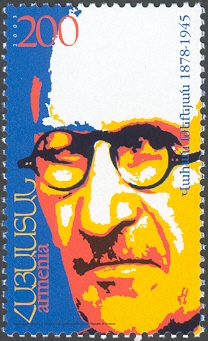
- Vahan Tekeyan, Armenian stamp (2003)
- Born: January 21, 1878. Constantinople, Ottoman Empire
- Died: April 4, 1945 (aged 67); Cairo, Egypt
- Occupations: poet and public activist
- Writing career
- Notable works: "The Armenian Cathedral", "A Prayer Before the Future", "Your Memory Tonight", "When the Day Finally Comes", and "Your Name"

Vahan Tekeyan (Armenian: Վահան Թէքէեան; January 21, 1878 – April 4, 1945) was an Armenian poet and public activist. In his lifetime he was the most famous poet of the Armenian diaspora, and he remains a significant symbol of Armenian identity and cultural heritage.

== Early life and education ==
Born in the Ortaköy district of Constantinople, Tekeyan attended primary education in that neighborhood. He attended the Nersisyan School, the Berberian School, and Getronagan Armenian High School.

== Career ==
Beginning in 1896, he worked as trading official, a job that involved a good deal of travel in Europe. He worked for a time as a newspaper editor in Beirut and, later, in Cairo. He also worked as a teacher and became involved in political and social activism.

In addition, he began to write and publish poetry. His first collection of poems, The Wonders, was published in Paris in 1901. From his base in Cairo, he wrote frequently for Armenian periodicals in the West, and in 1905 he founded the periodical Shirak, which published the work of many writers in the Armenian diaspora.

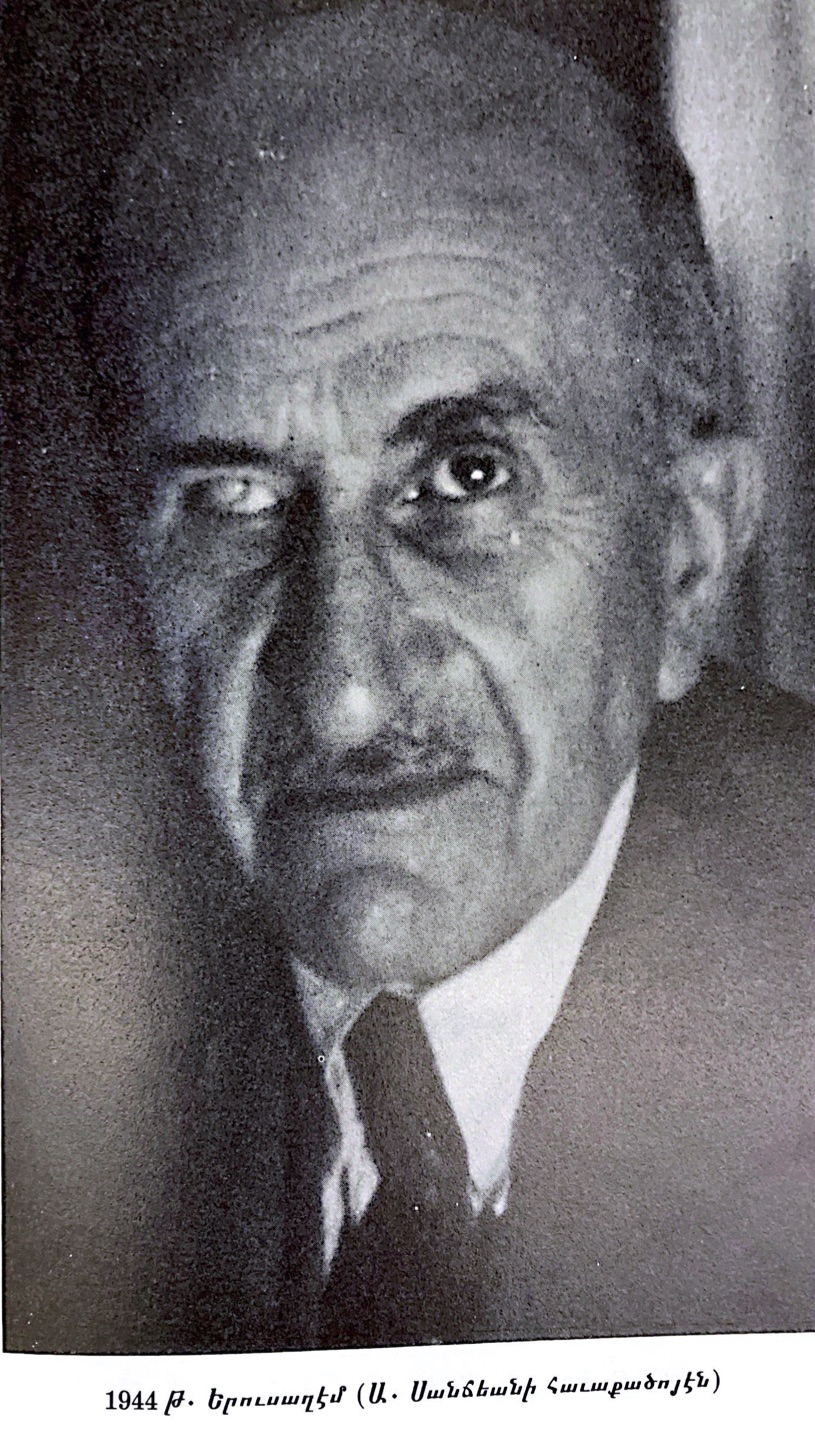
Vahan Tekeyan, Jerusalem 1944 (his glass eye visible)

After the collapse of the dictatorial regime of Abdul Hamid II, the sultan of the Ottoman Empire, in 1909, Tekeyan moved from Cairo to Constantinople, where he continued to publish Shirak and became an established public figure in Constantinople. When the First World War began in 1914, Tekeyan happened to be in Egypt, which enabled him to escape the bloodshed. Eventually, however, he did return to Constantinople, where he edited a newspaper, Voice of the People, then served as director of the Central School. Political tumult in Constantinople ultimately drove him back to Egypt, where he edited the daily newspaper Arev until the end of his life.

Tekeyan's poems include: The Armenian Church, A Prayer on the Eve of Tomorrow, Your Memory Tonight, When the Day Finally Comes, and Your Name.

His later collections of poetry include The Wonderful Renaissance (1914), Midnight to the Dawn (1919), Love (1933), Hayerghutyun (1943), and Tagharan (1944). He also translated works by Shakespeare, Victor Hugo, and Oscar Wilde into Armenian.

He died in 1945 in Cairo, where he is buried at the Armenian cemetery.

== Legacy ==
He has been called the "Prince of Armenian Poetry." Tekeyan's themes in poetry revolved mostly around love, such as compassionate love, love for one's homeland, or love for humanity.

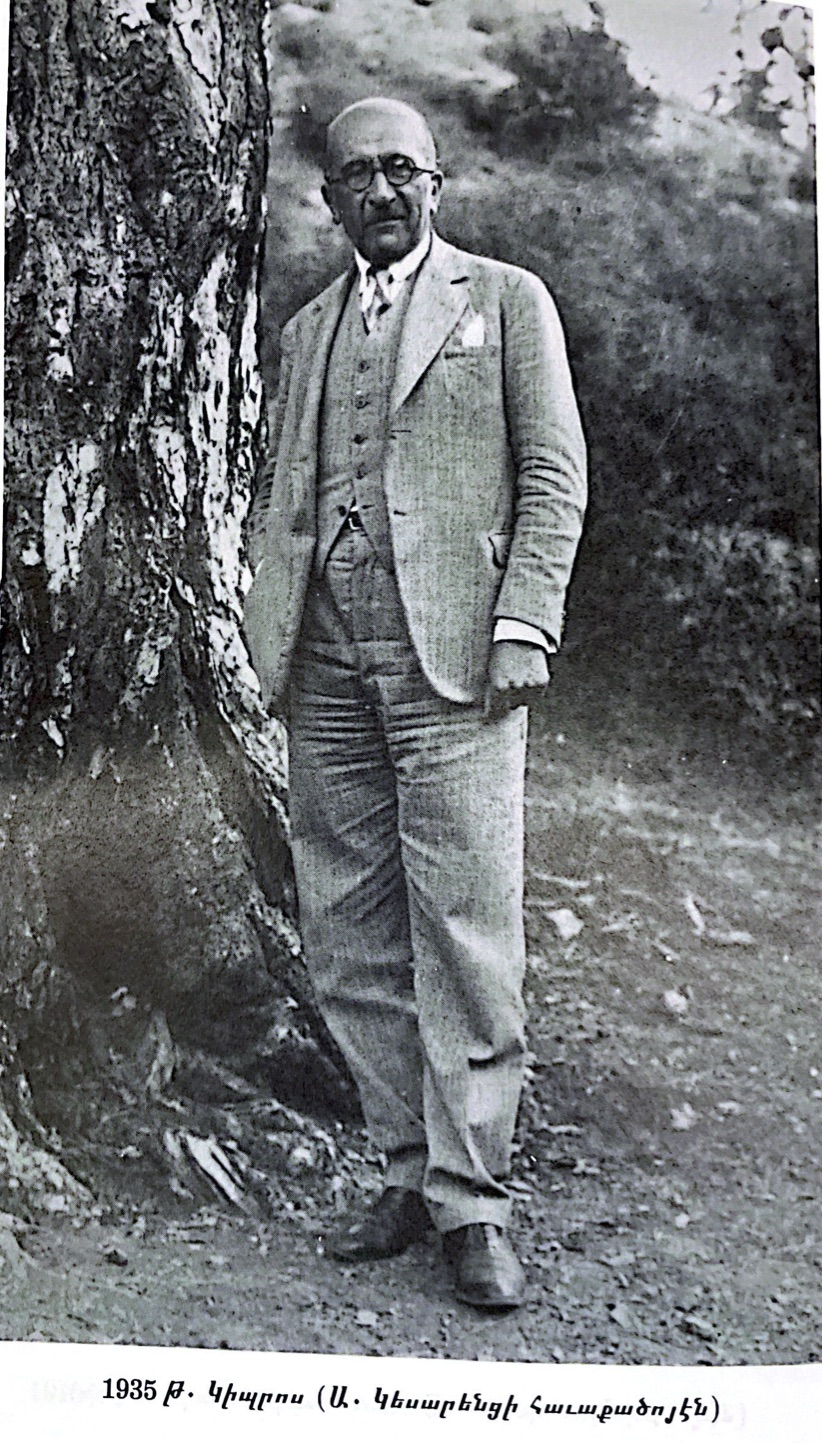
Vahan Tekeyan, Cyprus 1935

Another Armenian intellectual and poet, Vahe Vahian, was heavily influenced by Vahan Tekeyan's work, from where his pen name came from.

His complete works, in nine volumes, were published in Cairo in 1949–50. Volumes of selected works were issued in Beirut in 1954 and in Yerevan in 1970. A collection of his letters was published in Los Angeles in 1983.

The Tekeyan Cultural Association was founded in 1947 in Beirut, and now has branches around the world.

== Books ==
- Sacred wrath: The selected poems, transl. Marzbed Margossian and Diana Der Hovanessian, Diana, New York, 1982, 76 p.; ISBN 0935102086.
