= Gürün =

- Municipality
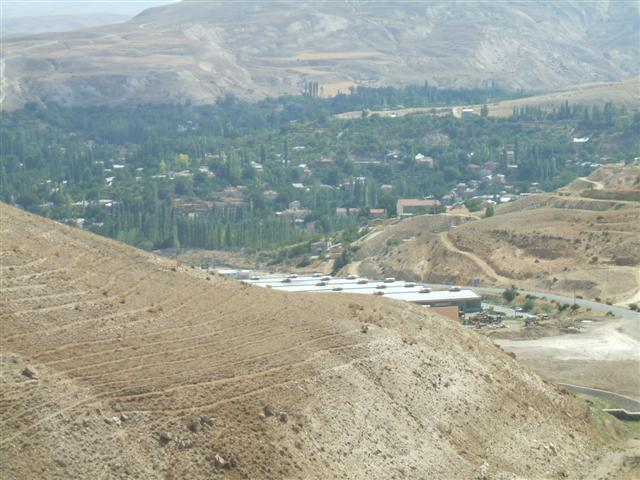

- Location within Turkey Location within Turkey Central Anatolia
- Coordinates: 38°43′21″N 37°16′39″E
- Country: Turkey
- Province: Sivas
- District: Gürün

Government
  - Mayor: Nami Çiftçi (MHP)
- Elevation: 1,334 m (4,377 ft)
- Population (2022): 10,657
- Time zone: UTC+3 (TRT)
- Postal code: 58800
- Area code: 0346
- Website: www.gurun.bel.tr

Gürün (Armenian: Կյուրին) is a town in Sivas Province of Turkey. It is the seat of Gürün District. Its population is 10,657 (2022).

== History ==
The settlement identified as Tergarma by the Assyrians on the eastern border of Tabal, and as Togarmah in the Book of Genesis, is associated with modern-day Gürün.

=== Late Bronze Age ===
Rock-cut caves located within the Şuğul quarter of Gürün, together with the Hieroglyphic Luwian inscriptions in the Şuğul Canyon, indicate that these structures likely date to the Hittite period in the 2nd millennium BCE.

During the reign of Šuppiluliuma I (c. 1344–1322 BCE), the Hittites captured the city of Tegarama during campaigns against the Hurrians to the east; several scholars likewise identify this city with Gürün.

=== Iron Age ===
Under Shalmaneser III (859–824 BCE), the Assyrians seized Tilgarimmu, located at the eastern frontier of Tabal. Owing to its position along valley routes, the settlement held strategic significance as a corridor between Tabal and regions further east, and the presence of iron deposits further enhanced its importance in antiquity.

=== Classical Age and later ===
In Classical Antiquity, the settlement appears under the name Gauraina.

Under the Achaemenid Empire, it formed part of the satrapy of Cappadocia and was captured by the Macedonian Kingdom in the 330s BCE. Shortly thereafter, it became part of the Kingdom of Cappadocia, founded by former Achaemenid satraps. During this period (c. 320 BCE – 17 CE), it belonged to the territory of Sargaurasene, administered by a stratēgos. The region was briefly taken by the Kingdom of Armenia during the early reign of Tigranes II, but Roman forces under Lucius Cornelius Sulla defeated the Armenians and restored the area to the Cappadocian client kingdom. Although it continued to change hands between Armenia and Cappadocia, the Roman victory at the Battle of Tigranocerta (69 BCE) secured its permanent attachment to Cappadocia. Following the Roman annexation of the Cappadocian Kingdom, the settlement became part of the Roman province of Cappadocia and later remained within the borders of the Byzantine Empire.

From the late 11th century onward, the area was exposed to Turkish incursions. After the Battle of Manzikert, it came under the control of the Danishmendids and later, toward the end of the 12th century, was incorporated into the Seljuk Sultanate of Rum. Following the Mongol victory at the Battle of Köse Dağ (1243), the region passed successively under the Mongol Empire and the Ilkhanate. With the decline of Ilkhanid authority, it came under the Eretna Beylik and, subsequently, the Mamluk Sultanate and the Dulkadirids. Although it was seized by Bayezid I, it entered the domain of Timur in 1402. Administrators loyal to the Timurids governed the region until it was definitively incorporated into the Ottoman Empire around 1408.

According to the 1530 Ottoman survey, Gürün was recorded as a nahiye within the Darende district of the Divriği and Darende sanjak. In the 16th century, the nahiye consisted of 16 settlements, including two non-Muslim quarters; two additional villages were added by 1548. By 1845, the town comprised nine quarters, five Muslim and four Christian, with Christians forming the majority at 1,247 households out of 1,843. In 1914, Gürün had 24,545 inhabitants: 15,640 Muslims and 8,905 Armenians (7,788 Gregorian, 703 Protestant, 414 Catholic).

During the Armenian Genocide, a sizable portion of the city's Armenian population was deported and killed. According to the memoir Goodbye, Antoura, during the pre-genocide years the Armenian population had achieved a level of stability in Gürün, with at least one Armenian family owning large swathes of land and orchards. In 1915, the Ottoman government appropriated these lands, and the Armenian population was deported southward and westward into the Syrian desert, eventually reaching the cities of Homs and Hama.

A student association of Armenians from Gürün was founded in Boston in 1899, which later became the Compatriotic Union of Gurin. The union's initial purpose was to assist survivors of the genocide and their families, and it established chapters across the world. The compatriotic union published two periodicals, one from 1930 to 1933 in New York and another from 1976 to 1981 in New Jersey, as well as a book titled Badmakirk' Gurini ("History Book of Gurin", 1974, Beirut). The union cooperated with Armenians from Gürün in Yerevan to found the village of Nor Kyurin in Soviet Armenia. The organization was dissolved in the late 20th century, as the last Armenians born in Gürün died of old age.

In September 2018, it was announced that a dilapidated Armenian church in Gürün would be renovated.

== Demographics ==
In his Seyahatname, Evliya Çelebi claimed that the town's population then was wholly made up of Turkomans. In 1914, there were 13,874 Armenians living in the kaza of Gürün, which contained five villages that were exclusively Armenian and a few scattered settlements. Gürün, the kaza's seat, had 12,168 residents, 8,406 of whom were Armenian.

== Notable people ==
- Hrant Dink (1954-2007), Turkish-Armenian intellectual, editor-in-chief of Agos, journalist, and columnist
- Antranig Dzarugian (1913–1989), Armenian writer, poet, educator and journalist
- Haroutiun Galentz (1910–1967), Armenian painter
- Hasan Hüseyin Korkmazgil (1927-1987), Turkish socialist realist poet
- Nurettin Sözen (born 1937), Turkish politician and 67th mayor of Istanbul (1989-1994)
- Abdüllatif Şener (born 1954), Turkish politician, former Minister of Finance and Deputy Prime Minister
- Vahe Vahian (1909–1998), Armenian poet, writer, editor, pedagogue and orator
- Adnan Yılmaz (born 1954), Turkish civil servant
- İsmet Yılmaz (born 1961), Turkish politician
- Cem Yılmaz (born 1973), Turkish comedian
