= Elda Grin =

Armenian writer and psychologist

- Էլդա Գրին
- Born: 10 March 1928; Tiflis (Georgia)
- Died: 27 October 2016 (aged 88)
- Education: Yerevan Russian Pedagogical Institute
- Occupations: Writer, psychologist, professor, and legal expert
- Writing career
- Notable works: “A Night Sketch”, “My Garden”, “We Want to Live Beautifully

Elda Ashoti Grigoryan (Armenian: Էլդա Աշոտի Գրիգորյան; 10 March 1928 – 27 October 2016), known also as Elda Grin (Armenian: Էլդա Գրին) was an Armenian writer, psychologist, professor, and legal expert.

== Biography ==
Grin was born in 1928 in Tiflis (Georgia), and between 1943-47 she studied at Foreign Language Faculty of Yerevan Russian Pedagogical Institute. In the 1950s, she studied Psychology at Moscow State University, where she wrote her thesis on the topic of psycholinguistics in 1955.

After graduating she became a psychology professor at Yerevan State University. where she would go on to lecture until at least 2010. She was awarded the Associate Professor degree in 1971 and later a Professor Degree (2003)

== Literary Works ==
Grin published multiple works in a career spanning over 50 years. Her literary works have included: "My Garden" in 1983, "We Wish to Live Beautiful" in 1982, "The Day is Not Over Yet" in 2000, "Requiem" in 2002 and "The Universe of Dreams" in 2004. In 2010 her short-story "The Hands" was published in Yerevan in a separate volume in 35 languages

== Forensic Psychology ==
Grin has been regarded as the founder of forensic examination in Armenia and worked as an expert psychologist within court processes since 1968. In 1999, she aided prosecutors trying to establish a motive of the attackers involved in the Armenian parliament shooting. In 2015, she gave testimony in the high profile case of Gyumri massacre perpetrator, Valery Permyakov in which she asserted he was sane at the time of the murders.

In 2016, she met the parents of Armenian soldiers while they were protesting at the president's office; they questioned her expert evidence in 2010 regarding a psychological assessment of first lieutenant Artak Nazaryan in which she supported the suicide verdict.
