= Adivar (crater) =

Crater on Venus

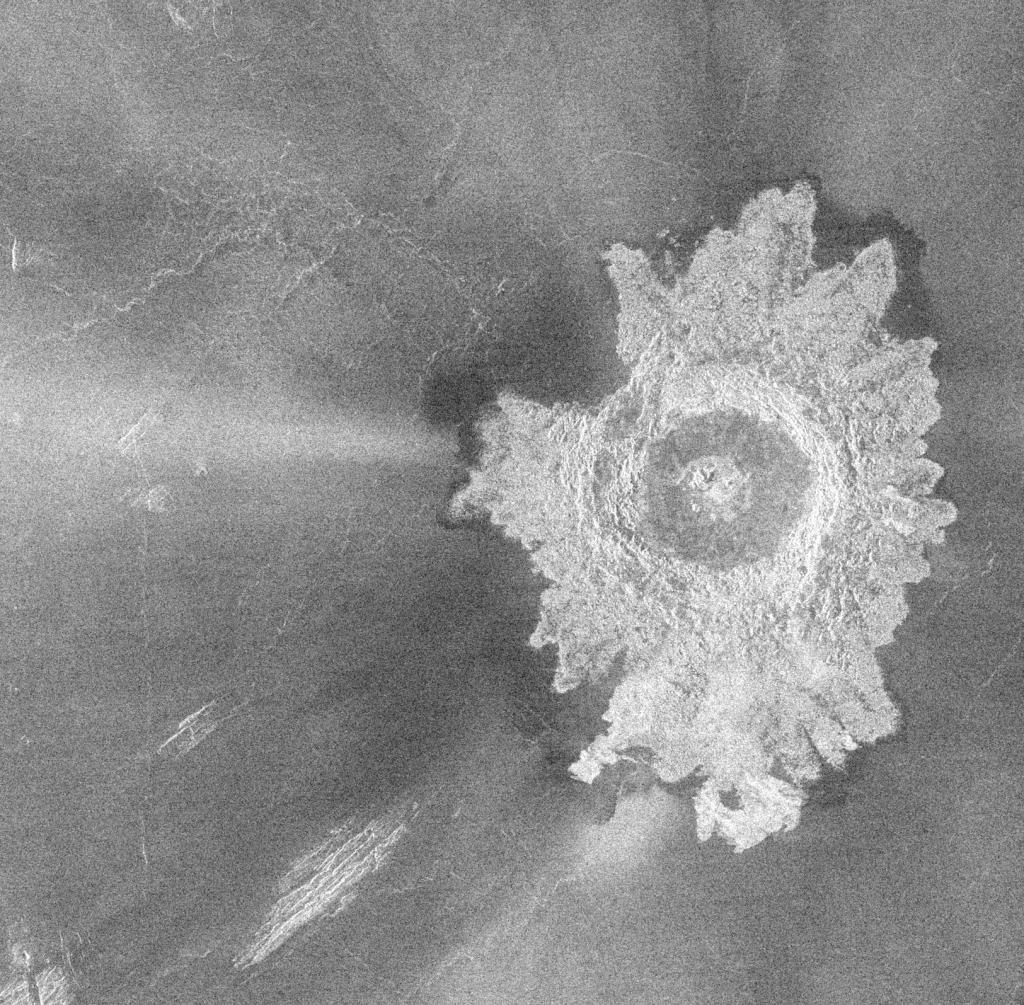
- Radar image of Adivar crater
- Location: Venus
- Coordinates: 8.9°N 76.2°E
- Diameter: 30 km
- Eponym: Halide Edib Adıvar

Adivar is an impact crater on the surface of Venus, named in honor of Turkish writer Halide Edib Adıvar.

== Geological description ==
The crater is located just north of the western Aphrodite highland (9 degrees north latitude, 76 degrees east longitude). Surrounding the crater rim is ejected material which appears bright in the radar image due to the presence of rough fractured rock. A much broader area has also been affected by the impact, particularly to the west of the crater. Radar-bright materials, including a jet-like streak just west of the crater, extend for over 500 kilometers (310 mi) across the surrounding plains. A darker streak, in a horseshoe or paraboloidal shape, surrounds the bright area.

Radar-dark (i.e., smooth) paraboloidal streaks were observed around craters in earlier Magellan images, but this is a rare bright crater streak. These unusual streaks, seen only on Venus, are believed to result from the interaction of crater materials (the meteoroid, ejecta, or both) and high-speed winds in the upper atmosphere. The precise mechanism that produces the streaks is poorly understood, but it is clear that the dense atmosphere of Venus plays an important role in the distribution of the ejected material.
