= Halide Edib Adıvar =

Turkish novelist, teacher, and a nationalist and feminist intellectual (1884-1964)

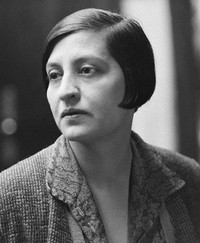

Member of the Grand National Assembly
- In office 14 May 1950 – 5 January 1954
- Constituency: İzmir (1950)

Personal details
- Born: 11 June 1884 Constantinople, Ottoman Empire
- Died: 9 January 1964 (aged 79) Istanbul, Turkey
- Resting place: Merkezefendi Cemetery, Istanbul, Turkey
- Citizenship: Turkey
- Spouse(s): Salih Zeki; Adnan Adıvar
- Education: American College for Girls
- Occupation: Novelist
- Awards: Şefkat Nişanı

Halide Edip Adıvar (Ottoman Turkish: خالده اديب [hɑːliˈde eˈdib], sometimes spelled Halidé Edib in English; 11 June 1884 – 9 January 1964) was a Turkish novelist, teacher, and a nationalist and feminist intellectual. She was best known for her novels criticizing the low social status of Turkish women and what she observed as a lack of interest of most women in changing their situation. She was a Pan-Turkist and several of her novels advocated for the Turanism movement.

During World War I, Halide Edib Adıvar served as the inspector of schools in Beirut, Damascus, and Aleppo. In this role, she oversaw for six months an orphanage in Antoura (in modern-day Lebanon) where children orphaned in the Armenian genocide were subjected to forced assimilation. In her memoirs, Adıvar indicates that she was responsible for administering the orphanage but did not believe that the practice of forced assimilation was ethical, and she states that her ultimate goal was to save the lives of the Armenian orphans. According to researcher Keith David Watenpaugh, regardless of the motives, what was done at the Antoura orphanage constitutes genocide, based on the 1948 Convention on the Prevention and Punishment of Genocide.

== Early life ==
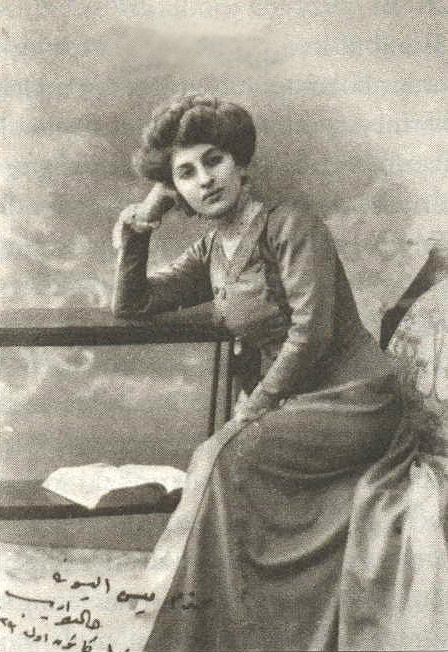
Early portrait

Halide Edib was born in Constantinople (Istanbul), Ottoman Empire to an upper-class family. Her father was a secretary of the Ottoman sultan, Abdul Hamid II. Halide Edib was educated at home by private tutors from whom she learned European and Ottoman literature, religion, philosophy, sociology, piano playing, English, French, and Arabic. She learned Greek from her neighbors and from briefly attending a Greek school in Constantinople. She attended the American College for Girls briefly in 1893. In 1897, she translated Mother by Jacob Abbott, for which the sultan awarded her the Order of Charity (Şefkat Nişanı). She attended the American College again from 1899 to 1901, when she graduated. Her father's house was a center of intellectual activity in Constantinople and even as a child Halide Edib participated in the intellectual life of the city.

After graduating, she married the mathematician and astronomer Salih Zeki Bey, with whom she had two sons. She continued her intellectual activities, however, and in 1908 began writing articles on education and on the status of women for Tevfik Fikret's newspaper Tanin and the women's journal Demet. She published her first novel, Seviye Talip, in 1909. Because of her articles on education, the education ministry hired her to reform girls' schools in Constantinople. She worked with Nakiye Hanım on curriculum and pedagogy changes and also taught pedagogy, ethics, and history in various schools. She resigned over a disagreement with the ministry concerning mosque schools.

She received a divorce from Salih Zeki in 1910. Her house became an intellectual salon, especially for those interested in new concepts of Turkishness. She became involved with the Turkish Hearths (Türk Ocağı) in 1911 and became the first female member in 1912. She was also a founder of the Elevation of Women (Taali-i Nisvan) organization. Among the people with whom she associated during this period was the Armenian priest and composer Komitas, whose music she highly valued and regarded as Anatolian rather than Armenian.

== During World War I ==
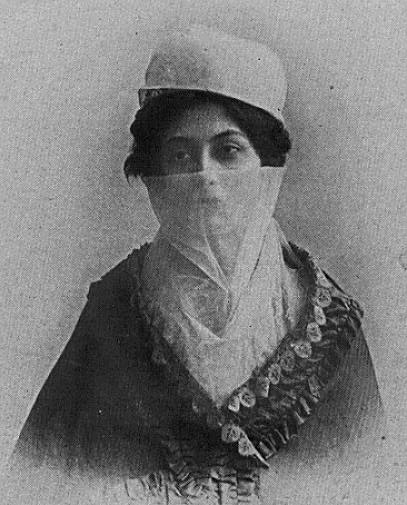
Early photo of Halide Edib wearing a yashmak

She married again in 1917 to Dr. Ali Adnan (later Adıvar) and the next year took a job as a lecturer in literature at Istanbul University's Faculty of Letters. It was during this time that she became increasingly active in Turkey's nationalist movement, influenced by the ideas of Ziya Gökalp.

In 1916–1917, she acted as Ottoman inspector for schools in Damascus, Beirut and the Collège Saint Joseph in Aintoura (or Antoura), Mount Lebanon. The students at these schools included hundreds of Armenian, Arab, Assyrian, Maronite, Kurdish, and Turkish orphans. In the course of the Armenian genocide and under the direction of Halide Edib Adıvar and Djemal Pasha, about 1,000 Armenian and 200 Kurdish children were "Turkified" at the Collège Saint Joseph. The children at the Aintoura orphanage were taken from existing orphanages, not saved from the streets by Djemal Pasha as Halide Edip later asserted. Most of the Armenian orphans at Aintoura returned to their Armenian identities after the Ottoman withdrawal.

Halide Edip's own account of her inspectorship—the accuracy of which has been questioned by modern scholars Selim Deringil and Shushan Khachatryan—and a few other accounts emphasize her humanitarian efforts and claim that she did not impose a strict policy of Islamization of the orphans. She claims that she was opposed to the policy of Turkification and initially refused to take part in the Aintoura orphanage but ultimately accepted "as a duty towards humanity". Deringil writes that Halide Edip "was personally involved in the project of Turkification and Islamization at Antoura". Robert Fisk wrote that Halide Edip "helped to run this orphanage of terror in which Armenian children were systematically deprived of their Armenian identity and given new Turkish names, forced to become Muslims and beaten savagely if they were heard to speak Armenian".

Karnig Panian, author of Goodbye, Antoura, was a six-year-old Armenian genocide survivor at the orphanage in 1916. Panian's name was changed to the number 551. He witnessed children that resisted Turkification being punished with beatings and starvation:

At every sunset in the presence of over 1,000 orphans, when the Turkish flag was lowered, 'Long Live General Pasha!' was recited. That was the first part of the ceremony. Then it was time for punishment for the wrongdoers of the day. They beat us with the falakha [a rod used to beat the soles of the feet], and the top-rank punishment was for speaking Armenian.

According to Panian, these punishments were carried out by the director Fevzi Bey, in Halide Edip's presence.

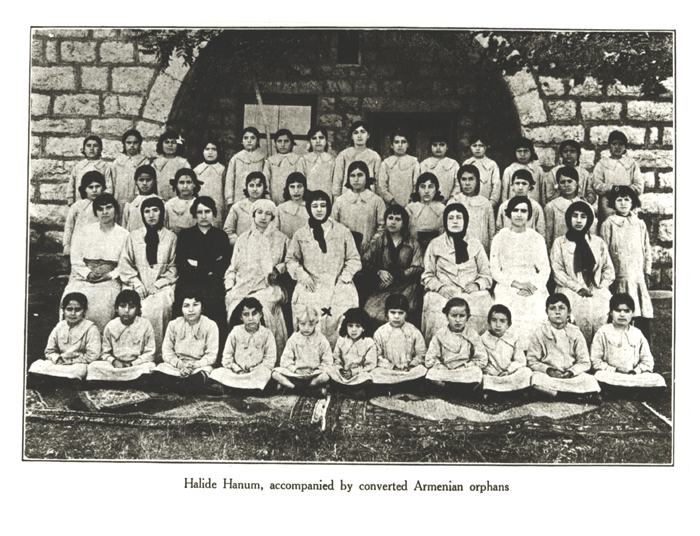
Halide Edip with her converted orphans

Emile Joppin, the head priest at the Saint Joseph College in Antoura, wrote in a 1947 school magazine:

The Armenian orphans were Islamicised, circumcised and given new Arab or Turkish names. Their new names always kept the initials of the names in which they were baptised. Thus Haroutioun Nadjarian was given the name Hamed Nazih, Boghos Merdanian became Bekir Mohamed, to Sarkis Safarian was given the name Safouad Sulieman.

In a 1918 report, American Red Cross officer Major Stephen Trowbridge, met with surviving orphans and reported:

Every vestige, and as far as possible every memory, of the children's Armenian or Kurdish origin was to be done away with. Turkish names were assigned and the children were compelled to undergo the rites prescribed by Islamic law and tradition ... Not a word of Armenian or Kurdish was allowed. The teachers and overseers were carefully trained to impress Turkish ideas and customs upon the lives of the children and to catechize them regularly on ... the prestige of the Turkish race.

Professor of Human Rights Studies Keith David Watenpaugh compared the treatment of non-Turkish orphans by Halide Edip and Djemal Pasha to the American and Canadian schools for Native American children that were forcibly assimilated and often abused. He wrote that Edip showed a strong hatred of Armenians in her writings, portraying them as "a mythical and existential enemy of the Ottomans" and even made claims of blood libel and child cannibalism similar to those in anti-Semitism. She also claimed a conspiracy to turn Turkish children into Armenians, "thus also turning the accusations leveled against her for her work at Antoura back toward the Armenians themselves". Watenpaugh writes of her:

Modernizing Turkey and defending its Muslim elite against Western criticism are key elements of Halide Edip's life's work, but her reluctance to protect Armenian children or even voice empathy for them as victims of genocide shows a basic lack of human compassion. For Halide Edip questions of social distinction and religion placed limits upon the asserted universal nature of humanity; for her, genocide had not been too high a price to pay for Turkish progress, modernity, and nationalism.

Despite her role in the orphanages in Antoura, Halide Edib expressed her sympathies with the Armenians regarding the bloodshed and drew the rage of the Committee of Union and Progress members inciting them to call for her punishment. Talat Pasha refused to administer any and said that "She serves her country in the way she believes. Let her speak her mind; she is sincere." A U.S. High Commissioner refers to her as a "chauvinist" and someone who is "trying to rehabilitate Turkey." On the other hand, German historian Hilmar Kaiser says: "And even if you're a Turkish nationalist, that doesn't make you a killer. There were people who were famous Turkish nationalists like Halide Edip; she advocated assimilation of Armenians, but she very strongly opposed any kind of murder." On 21 October 1918, Halide Edip then wrote an article in the Vakit newspaper condemning the massacres: "We slaughtered the innocent Armenian population ... We tried to extinguish the Armenians through methods that belong to the medieval times". In biographer Hülya Adak's view, Edip's position evolved over time: earlier she had been more sympathetic to Armenians, but in the 1920s she adopted the "defensive Republican narrative" and justified the Armenian genocide as "reciprocal killings".

From 1919 to 1920 she was among the contributors of Büyük Mecmua, a weekly established to support the Turkish independence war.

== During the War of Independence ==
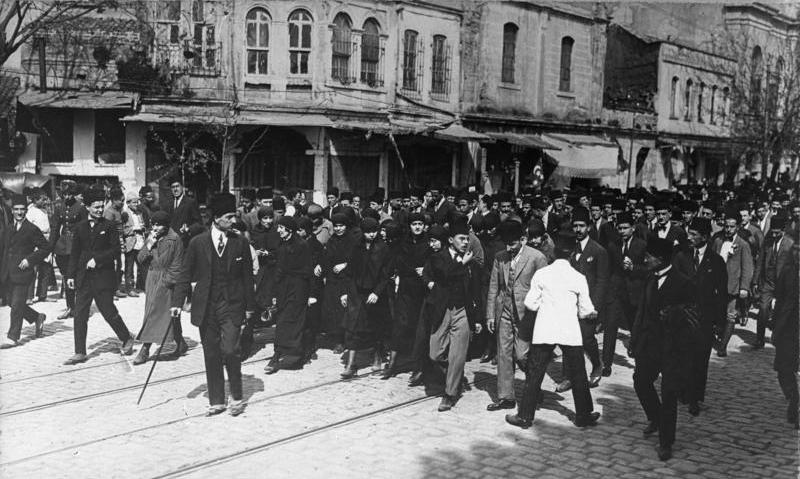
In a demonstration during the Turkish War of Independence

After the defeat of the Ottoman Empire in World War I, Allied forces occupied Constantinople and various other regions of the empire. Mustafa Kemal Atatürk began organizing resistance to the occupation, and Edib gained a reputation in Istanbul as a "firebrand and a dangerous agitator." She was one of the main figures of the empire to give speeches to thousands of people protesting the occupation of Smyrna by Greek forces during the Sultanahmet demonstrations.

Edib eventually left Constantinople and moved to Anatolia together with her husband to join the Turkish National Movement. On the road to Ankara she met with Yunus Nadi Abalıoğlu, another journalist who had decided to join the Turkish National Movement. In a meeting at the train station in Geyve, on 31 March 1920, they agreed on the importance of informing the international public opinion about the developments regarding the Turkish War of Independence and decided to help the national struggle by establishing a news agency. They concurred on the name "Anadolu Ajansı".

During the Greco-Turkish War she was granted the ranks of first corporal and then sergeant in the nationalist army. In her memoirs, she emphasized the active participation of women in combat during the war. She traveled to the fronts, worked in the headquarters of İsmet Pasha, Commander of the Western Front and wrote her impressions of the scorched earth policy of the invading Hellenic Army and the atrocities committed against Turkish civilians by the Greek Army in Western Anatolia in her book The Turkish Ordeal.

== After the war ==
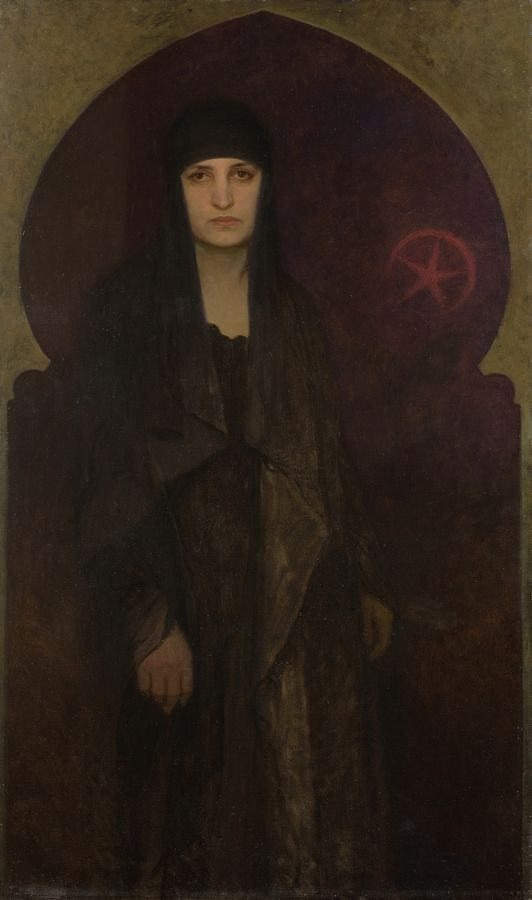
Halide Edib by Alphonse Mucha, 1928

As a result of her husband Adnan Adıvar's participation in the establishment of the Progressive Republican Party, the family moved away from the ruling elite. When the one-party period started in 1926 with the Progressive Republican Party's abolition and the approval of the Law of Reconciliation, she and her husband were accused of treason and escaped to Europe. They lived in France and the United Kingdom from 1926 to 1939.

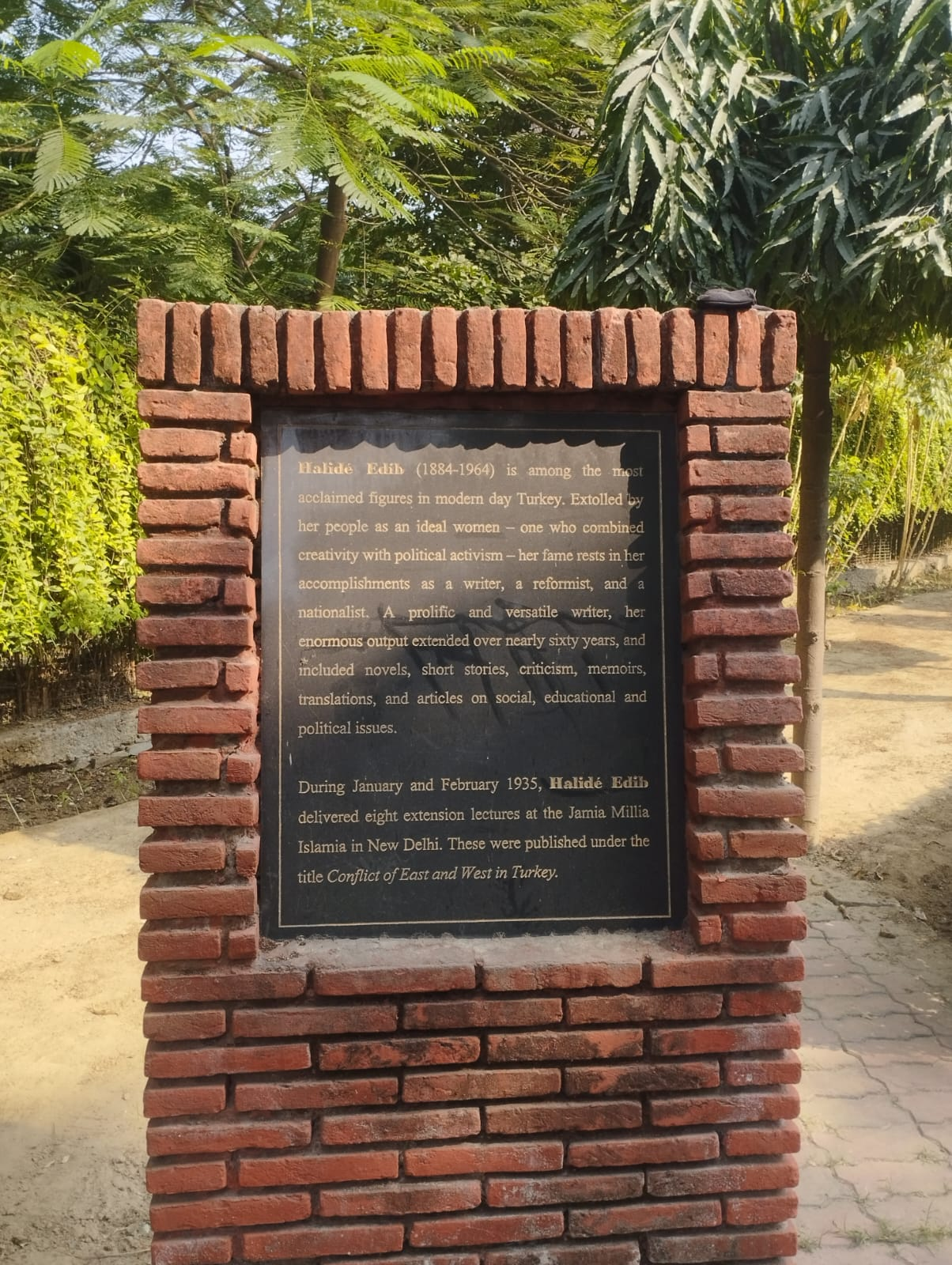
An inscription at Jamia Millia Islamia commentrating Halide Edib

Halide Edib traveled widely, teaching and lecturing repeatedly in the United States and in India. She collected her impressions of India as a British colony in her book Inside India. She returned to Turkey in 1939, becoming a professor in English literature at the Faculty of Letters in Istanbul. In 1950, she was elected to Parliament, resigning in 1954; this was the only formal political position she ever held.

== Literature ==
Common themes in Halide Edib's novels were strong, independent female characters who succeeded in reaching their goals against strong opposition. She was also a fervent Turkish nationalist, and several stories highlight the role of women in Turkish independence. She also published a thriller novel, Yolpalas Cinayeti (Murder in Yolpalas), which was first serialized in Yedigün magazine between 12 August and 21 October 1936.

She was a Pan-Turkist and promoted Turanism in several of her novels. Her book entitled Yeni Turan (New Turan) calls for the unification of Turkic peoples in Central Asia and the Caucasus under an empire led by Turkey.

== Description ==
A contemporary described her as "a slight, tiny little person, with masses of auburn hair and large, expressive Oriental eyes, she has opinions on most subjects, and discusses the problems of the day in a manner which charms one not so much on account of what she says, but because it is so different from what one expected".

== Death ==
Halide Edib died on 9 January 1964 in Istanbul. She was laid to rest at the Merkezefendi Cemetery in Istanbul.

== Legacy ==
Starting in the 1970s, the Ottoman and Turkish Studies Association awarded students a Halide Edip Adıvar scholarship. After Adıvar's involvement in the Armenian genocide became widely known, the Association attempted to rename the scholarship; however, as of 2021 the name remains because the association's board had not yet obtained the consent of the donor who sponsors the Halide Edip Adıvar scholarships.

=== Major works ===
- Raik'in Annesi
- Heyula
- Seviye Talip (1910).
- Handan (1912).
- Mevut Hükümler (1918).
- Yeni Turan (1912).
- Son Eseri (1919).
- Ateşten Gömlek (1922; translated into English as The Daughter of Smyrna or The Shirt of Flame).
- Çıkan Kuri (1922).
- Kalb Ağrısı (1924).
- Vurun Kahpeye (1926).
- The Memoirs of Halide Edib, New York-London: The Century, 1926 (published in English). Profile
- The Turkish Ordeal , New York-London: The Century, 1928 (memoir, published in English).
- Zeyno'nun Oğlu (1928).
- Turkey Faces West, New Haven-London: Yale University Press/Oxford University Press, 1930.
- The Clown and His Daughter (first published in English in 1935 and in Turkish as Sinekli Bakkal in 1936).
- "Tatarcik" (1939)
- "Akile Hanim Sokağı" (1958)
- Inside India (first published in English in 1937 and in Turkish as Hindistan'a Dair in its entirety in 2014.)
- Türk'ün Ateşle İmtihanı (memoir, published in 1962; translated into English as House with Wisteria).

=== In popular culture ===
- The novel Halide's Gift by Frances Kazan (2001) is a coming-of-age story about Halide Edib's youth and maturation.
- Halide Edib appears as a character in several films and television shows including Kurtuluş, Cumhuriyet, and The Young Indiana Jones Chronicles.
- Several of Halide Edib's novels have also been adapted for film and television. One of them is Yolpalas Cinayeti.
- Halide Edib is the subject of The Greedy Heart of Halide Edib, a documentary film for school children.

== See also ==
- Adivar (crater)
- Witnesses and testimonies of the Armenian genocide
- Women in Turkish politics
