= Hover Chamber Choir =

Armenian choir

Hover Chamber Choir is an Armenian choir. It was established in 1992 in Armenia by Sona Hovhannisyan and students at Yerevan State Komitas Conservatory. Hover received the Gold Medal at the International Choir Olympiad in Linz, Austria in 2000, became a prize winner at the International Competition in Tours, France, and received diplomas at the International Polyphonic Music Festival in Arezzo, Italy in 1997.

Hover's repertoire includes baroque, classical, contemporary, folk, and sacred music. Among the major works they have premiered in Armenia are J. S. Bach's St John and St Matthew Passions and Britten's Cantata Missericordia, in addition to performances of Requiems by Mozart and Cherubini, Avet Terterian's Sixth Symphony, and Stepan Rostomian's "Entrance" chamber opera (conducted by Diego Masson). Hover has also participated in concert performances of operas Madama Butterfly, The Barber of Seville, and Pagliacci and toured Great Britain, France, and Germany. In 2007, the male contingent of the choir appeared in sacred music festivals in Poland. In 2008, a performance of choral pieces by Penderecki was praised by the composer as one of the best. The choir has released numerous CDs and a DVD. It has also contributed to the soundtracks for Ararat by Atom Egoyan and the restoration of Armenia's first silent film Namus.

== Awards ==
- Best Choir/Chorus Album, Armenian Music Awards (2004)

== Discography ==
- Spiritual Choir Music by Ludwig Bazil (Venice, 1998)
- Armenian Voices (Pomegranate Music, United States 2002)
- Six Fables. Music by Stepan Babatorosyan to the fables by Mkhitar Aigektsi (Pomegranate Music, United States 2003; received Armenian Music Awards)
- The Way (VEM, United States, 2005)
- Armenian Divine Liturgy by Komitas, (Hover Recordings, Germany, 2006)
- Armenian Folk Songs arr. by Komitas (Hover Recordings, Germany, 2007)

== Management ==
- Arman Padaryan since 2004
