= Collège Saint Joseph – Antoura =

Location
- Aintoura, Mount Lebanon, Keserwan District; LEB; 33.957°N 35.634°E

Information
- Religious affiliation: Roman Catholic Church
- Established: 1834; 192 years ago
- Founders: Congregation of the Mission
- Head of school: Father Antoine-Pierre Nakad
- Average class size: 32
- Education system: French & Lebanese Baccalaureate
- Colors: Red, Gold and Royal Blue
- Accreditation: French Ministry of Education
- Yearbook: Palmarès
- Website: www.college-antoura.edu.lb
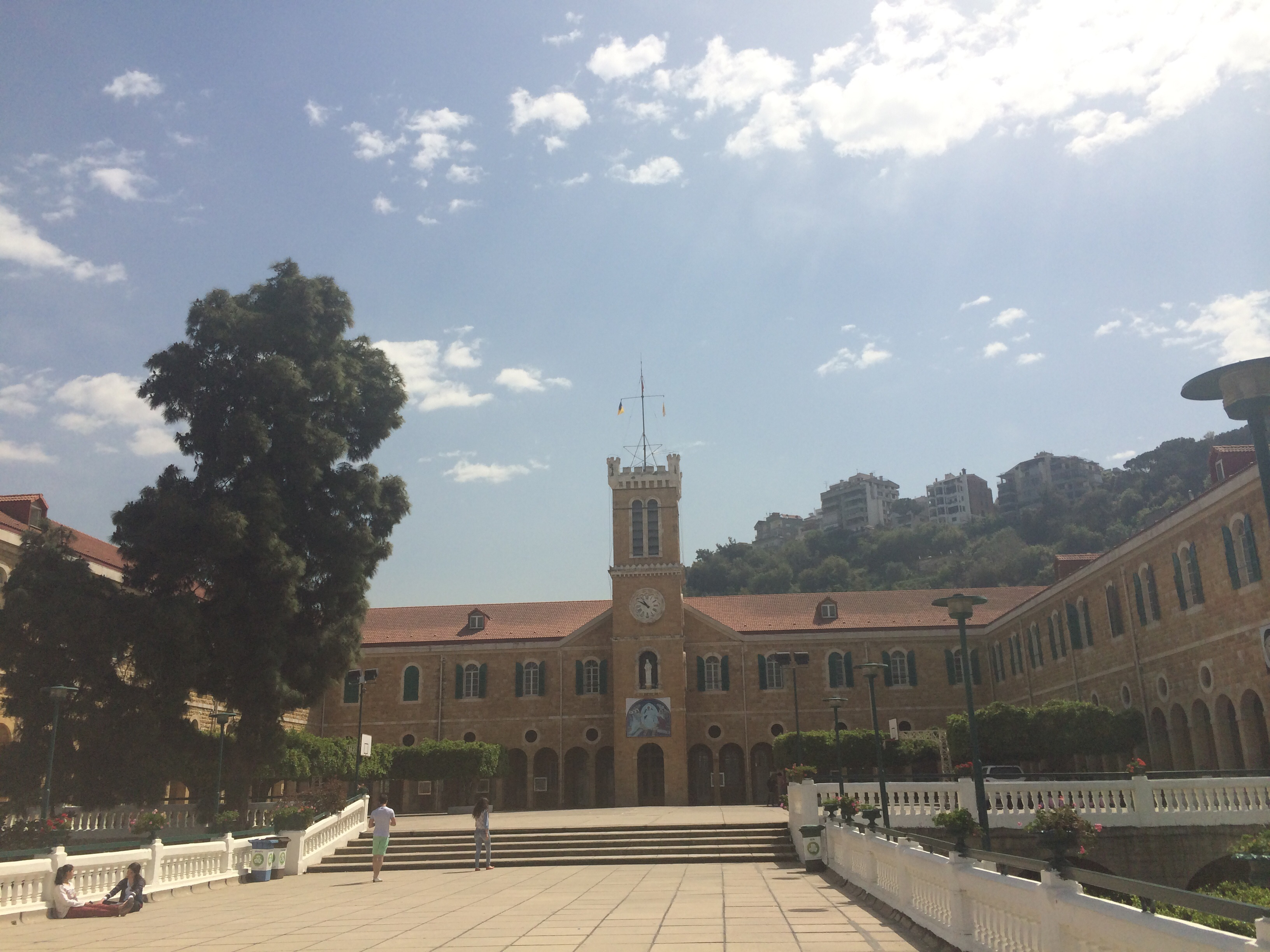
- The Main Court

The Collège Saint Joseph in Aintoura, Lebanon, is the oldest French school in the Middle East. It was established in 1834 by the Lazarist priests, led by Fr. Andrew Francis. The school's current headmaster is Father Abdo Eid and its student body comprises 5500 students. Located in the valley of Aintoura, the campus consists of more than eight buildings with several courts and gardens. It is accredited by the French Ministry of Education and has the status of "école homologuée". The high school or "lycée" offers both the Lebanese and French baccalaureate programs with the possibility of a double baccalaureate program.

It is classified as a French international school by the AEFE.

The school also accommodates the oldest scouts group in Lebanon. Previously members of the Scouts et Guides de France, the scouts and guides of Saint Joseph Antoura later joined the Scouts du Liban association when it was formed. Antoura is known for the visit of French writers Alphonse de Lamartine and Gérard de Nerval, who wrote about the school and the town.

== History ==
Since 1651, local Cheikh Abou Nawfal Khazen had been requesting Jesuit fathers to establish a mission on his lands in Antoura. It wasn't until 1773 that their efforts were realized with the arrival of monks from The Lazarist order. In 1834, the apostolic delegate Monseigneur Auvergne encouraged the transformation of the mission into a teaching college. Antoura's beginnings were quite modest, in October 1834 seven students were enrolled, thus forming the first secondary Francophone school in the Middle East. Over the course of the 19th century, the college developed. In 1874, the central building was built. The Left wing opened in 1884 and the chapel was inaugurated in 1895. The symbol of the school, the tower, was built in 1904.

During World War I and the Armenian genocide, the Lazarists were expelled by the Ottomans and the college was transformed into an orphanage where, under the direction of Djemal Pasha and Halide Edib Adıvar, about 1,000 Armenian and 200 Kurdish children were forcefully Turkified. The story of the Turkification of the children during the Armenian genocide is portrayed in Goodbye, Antoura, released in English in 2015 and written by one of the children who were interned at the orphanage.

College attendance saw a resurgence in 1919, counting 350 Students. In 1936, the French Academy awarded the Grand Prix of French Language to the college. In 1977, despite the Lebanese Civil War, the Kindergarten building was built. The Centre Lamartine, named after the French poet who visited the college, is a documentation center which is used by students and teachers to further their research. In 1982, the boarding school was opened. The college then counted 2,500 students. In 1996, the chapel was restored. The Saint Joseph Sports center was opened in 2006.

== Academics ==
The College Offers 15 years of schooling, starting with three years of pre-school ("Maternelle") and 12 years of schooling (Grade 1 to 12). The school follows the standard Lebanese program. Students in grade 9 are required to pass the Brevet examination before joining the Secondary cycle ("high school"). Students graduate after finishing the grade 12 program and then passing the Baccalaureate. They are required to select one of four concentrations: Sciences (Life or General), Sociology, Economics, and Humanities. The school also offers students the possibility of studying both the French and Lebanese Baccalaureates, in a double intensive program. The average size of the graduating class in Antoura varies typically between 200 and 250 students.

== Location ==
The town of Antoura sits on a hill overlooking the Mediterranean, at an altitude ranging between 250 and 300m above sea level. The town is bordered by Zouk Mikael and Zouk Mosbeh to the west, Hrash, Jeita and Ain El Rihani to the east.

== Etymology ==
Antoura derives from Syriac `aïn meaning "fountain" or "spring" and țoura meaning "mountain".

== Notable alumni ==
- Charles Helou President of Lebanon from 1964 to 1970
- Suleiman Frangieh - President of Lebanon from 1970 to 1976
- René Moawad - President of Lebanon in 1989 (assassinated while in office)
- Riad Al Solh - First Lebanese Prime Minister after Lebanon's independence from France in 1943
- Sabri Hamadeh - Speaker of the Parliament
- Hamid Frangieh - Politician, Minister and Member of Parliament
- Kamal Jumblatt - Politician, Member of Parliament and Minister, Druze leader and founder of the Progressive Socialist Party
- Jawad Boulos - Historian
- Violette Khairallah Safadi - Minister
- Ziyad Baroud - Interior Minister 2008–2011
- Michel Elefteriades - Producer
- Ibrahim Najjar - Justice Minister 2008–2011
- Romeo Lahoud - Director & Composer
- Elias Abu Shabaki - Poet
- May Ziadeh - Poet
- Ghassan Tueni - Author, diplomat, journalist, public intellectual
- Mohammad-Ali Jamalzadeh - One of the most prominent Iranian writers of the 20th century
- Nancy Ajram - Singer and Arab Music Idol
- Maurice Gemayel - Politician
- Liliane Tannoury - Journalist
- Valerie Abou Chacra - Miss Lebanon 2015

== See also ==
- Education in the Ottoman Empire

== Official website ==
- Collège_Saint_Joseph_–_Antoura
