= Tekeyan Cultural Association =

The Tekeyan Cultural Association (Armenian: Թէքէեան մշակութային միութիւն, TCA) is a network of Armenian cultural organizations active in 16 countries.

== History ==
It was established in 1947 in Beirut, Lebanon, named after the poet Vahan Tekeyan. It aims to preserve the Armenian culture and heritage in the Armenian diaspora, and to promote cultural, spiritual and educational ties with the homeland, irrespective of political and ideological barriers. Hampartzoum Berberian, Gersam Aharonian and Barunak Tovmasian were among the founders.

The TCA is part of a network of similarly affiliated branches in North America, Europe, the Middle East and Armenia. The various branches have their own regional cultural centres, schools and publications. In the US, the Association publishes the trilingual weekly newspaper Abaka in Montreal, an English language weekly newspaper The Armenian Mirror-Spectator in Boston, Baikar Weekly, AZK, HayDzayn, Nor Ashkhar and Nor Or newspapers.

A TCA branch has operated in Armenia since its independence in 1991.

== Awards ==
Tekeyan Armenian Cultural Association set annual awards to five spheres of culture: literature, music, fine arts, theatre and cinema. The "Diamond Ararat" medal was awarded to baroness Caroline Cox (England), benefactor Habet Torosyan (US), academician Fadey Sargsyan, duduk player Jivan Gasparyan for outstanding service in the promotion and development of Armenian culture.

The Tekeyan Cultural Association also grants Haykashen Uzunian annual awards.

== See also ==
- Nor Serount Cultural Association
